= Mass media in Turkey =

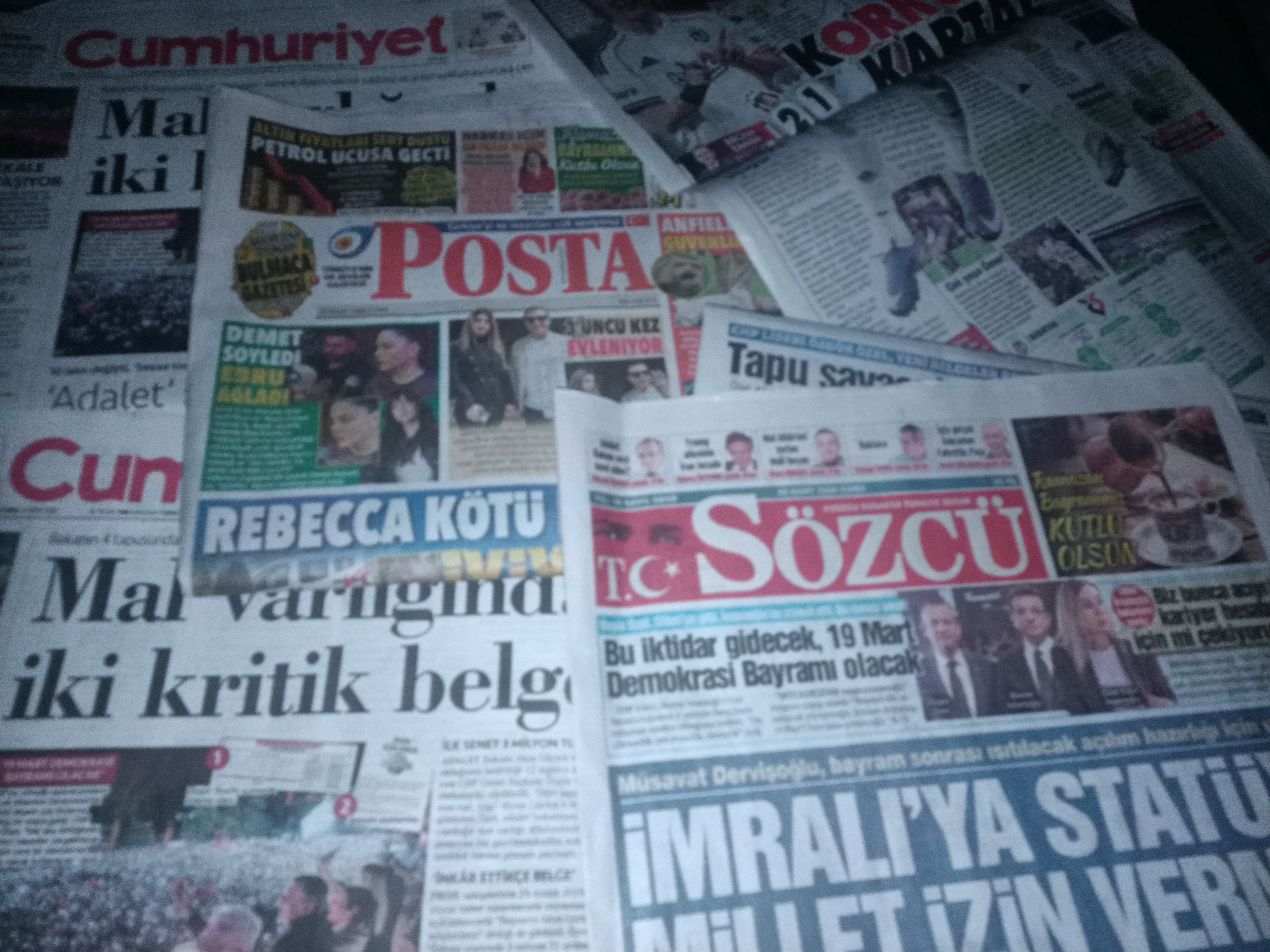
Newspapers of Turkey

The mass media in Turkey includes a wide variety of domestic and foreign periodicals. 90% of the media ownership is concentrated in the hands of a few pro-government media groups. Inevitably censorship in Turkey is an issue, and in the 21st century many journalists have been arrested and writers prosecuted. On Reporters Without Borders' Press Freedom Index the country ranking has fallen from around 100 in 2005 to 159 in 2025.

In reaction to the failed coup d'état on 15 July 2016, over 150 media organisations, including newspapers, television and radio channels, news agencies, magazines and publishing houses, have been closed down by the government of Turkey, and 160 journalists have been jailed.

By circulation, the most popular daily newspapers are Sabah, Sözcü, Hürriyet, Posta, and Milliyet. The broadcast media have a very high penetration as satellite dishes and cable systems are widely available. The "Radio and Television Supreme Council" (RTÜK) is the government body overseeing the broadcast media. Aside from Turkish, the state television network offers some programs in Arabic and Kurdish.

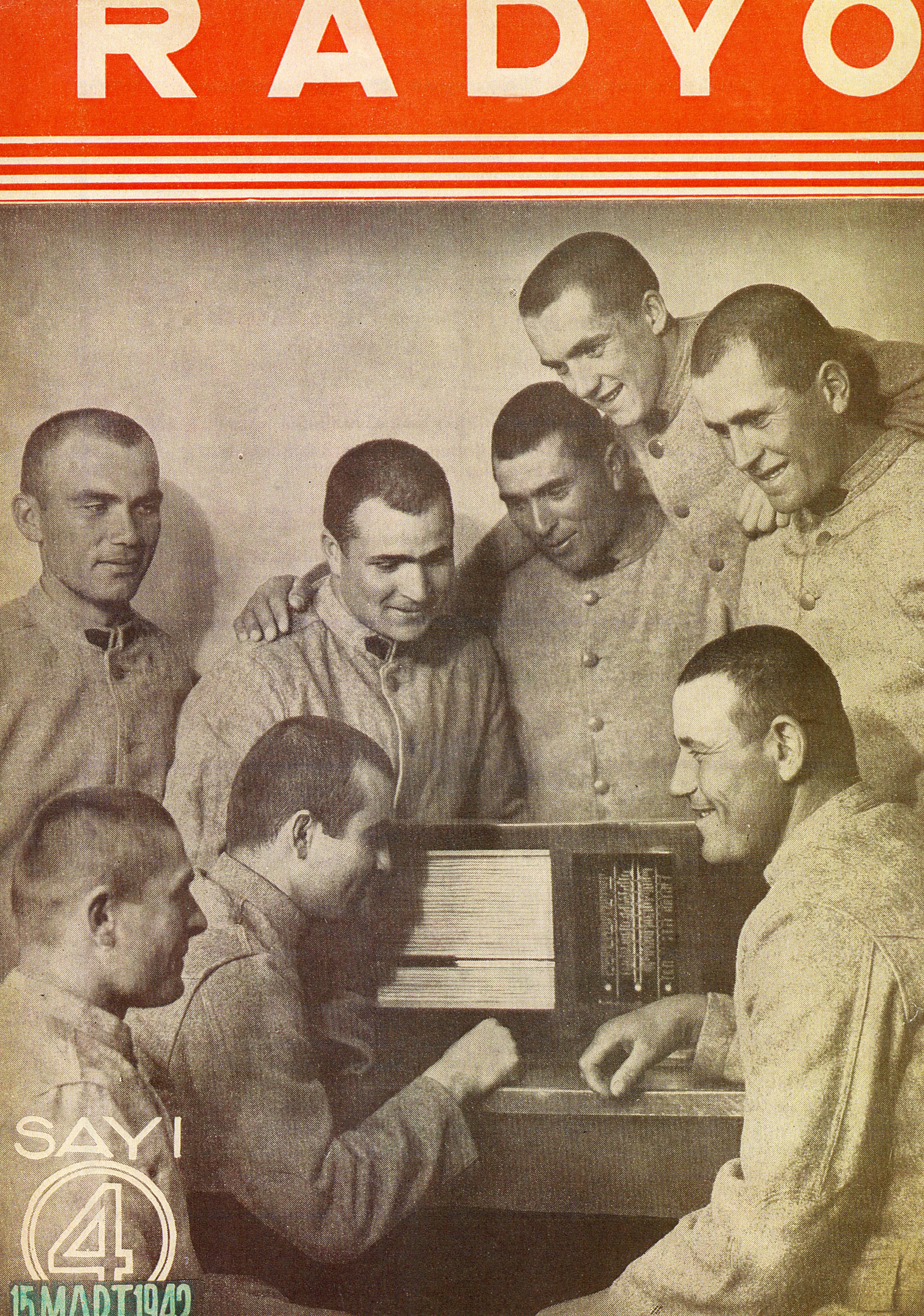
During the days when the photo was taken, Ankara Radio House used to do live broadcasting in 1940.

Turkish consumers are the second-most media illiterate when compared to countries in Europe, leaving them especially vulnerable to fake news, according to a 2018 study. A combination of low education levels, low reading scores, low media freedom and low societal trust went into making the score, which saw Turkey being placed second lowest only to North Macedonia. Conspiracy theories are a prevalent phenomenon in Turkish media. According to the Reuters Institute Digital News Report 2018, Turkey was the country where people complained the most about completely made-up stories.

According to polling in 2024 by the Pew Research Center, 33% of adult Turks believe that media in Turkey have somewhat good or very good influence on the country, which is a decline from 57% who said so in 2017, while 63% stated that they had a very bad or somewhat bad influence on the country. People with a favorable view of Recep Tayyip Erdoğan viewed the media more positively with 47% saying that it had a good influence on the country, compared to 23% of people who viewed Erdoğan unfavorably.

== Legislative framework ==
The Constitution of Turkey, at art. 28, states that the press is free and shall not be censored. Yet, Constitutional guarantees are undermined by restrictive provisions in the Criminal Code, Criminal Procedure Code, and anti-terrorism laws, effectively leaving prosecutors and judges with ample discretion to repress ordinary journalistic activities. The Turkish judiciary can and do censure media outlets under other constitutional provisions and loosely interpreted laws, such as “protecting basic characteristics of the Republic” and “safeguarding the indivisible integrity of the State with its territory and nation.”

Freedom of information principles have been introduced with the April 2004 Right to Information Act, affording to citizens and legal persons the right to request information from public institutions and private organizations that qualify as public institutions, although the implementation of the law is lacking.

The 2007 Press Law was coupled with a “Regulation of Publications on the Internet and Suppression of Crimes Committed Through Such Publications”, authorising the Telecommunications Communication Presidency (TIB) to execute court orders to block websites and to issue blocking orders for the content providers in or outside Turkey for committing crimes such as child pornography, encouraging drug use and, especially, crimes against Atatürk. Between 2007 and 2010 around 3,700 websites and platforms including YouTube, MySpace, and GeoCities have been blocked.

=== Status and self-regulation of journalists ===
Media professionals in Turkey face job insecurity and lack of social security, being often forced to work without contract and outside the protection provided by the Law 212 on the rights of journalists. Without a contact under Law 212 media workers in Turkey cannot obtain a press badge and cannot take part in the Turkish Journalists Union (Türkiye Gazeteciler Sendikası, TGS)

Turkey's 2001 financial crisis further strengthened media owners' hands, as 3–5,000 journalists were fired, and the most troublesome ones targeted first.

Some themes have long remained quasi-taboo in the Turkish media, including the role of the Army, the Cyprus issue and the rights of the Kurdish and Armenian minorities. The interests of media owners in the major media conglomerates inevitably cast a shadow over the objectivity and independence of the controlled media outlets.

Ethics in Turkish journalism is based on a couple of documents: the “Declaration of Rights and Responsibilities” by Turkish Journalists Association (1998) and the “Code of Professional Ethics of the Press” by Turkish Press Council (1989).

In 2006 RTÜK introduced a voluntary ombudsman mechanism that media outlets can introduce in order to evaluate their audience's reactions. Yet, ombudsmen lack independence, as they are high-ranking employees of the same media groups.

== Media outlets ==
Turkey hosts thousands of registered newspapers, including around 150–200 national titles, although only a fraction maintain significant circulation. A relatively small percentage are nationwide daily newspapers, while the majority consist of local or regional publications. Turkish print media traditionally places strong emphasis on opinion columns and commentary, and outlets are often characterised by pronounced political polarisation.

Broadcast media includes hundreds of television channels and thousands of radio stations, including outlets broadcasting in minority languages. The expansion of Kurdish-language media in the 2000s was regarded as a significant development in minority rights, though such outlets have faced regulatory and financial constraints.

The principal structural issues affecting mainstream media in Turkey include high concentration of ownership, widespread self-censorship among journalists, and the presence of nationalist rhetoric and hate speech. A large share of national newspapers and television channels are owned by conglomerates active in construction, energy, finance, and tourism, increasing their economic dependence on state contracts and public procurement.

Following the 2016 Turkish coup d'état attempt, numerous media outlets were closed by emergency decrees and dozens of journalists were detained as part of what has been described as a broad media purge. Public protests by journalists against arrests and newsroom closures were widely reported.

By the mid-2000s, three major media groups dominated advertising revenues in Turkey: the Doğan Media Group and the Sabah group together controlled approximately 80% of newspaper advertising, while Doğan, Sabah and the Çukurova Group accounted for around 70% of television advertising revenues.

In the Turkish context, highly concentrated corporate media power (such as Doğan’s) is even more significant when three additional factors are considered: (1) the willingness of corporate owners to ‘instrumentalize’ reporting in order to fit the wider political-economic interests of the parent company; (2) the weakness of journalists and other employees in the face of the power of corporate owners; and (3) the fact that corporate power is combined with restrictive state regulation on issues of freedom of speech.

Since 2018, the structure of media ownership has changed significantly. The sale of the Doğan Group’s media assets to the Demirören Group marked a major consolidation of mainstream media under ownership widely regarded as close to the government. As a result, a substantial portion of national print and broadcast media became concentrated within pro-government conglomerates.

Major cross-media groups active in Turkey in the 2020s include:

- Demirören Group (owner of Hürriyet, Posta, Milliyet, Fanatik, and formerly CNN Türk and Kanal D in partnership structures).
- Turkuvaz Media Group of Çalık Holding (publisher of Sabah and operator of ATV).
- Doğuş Media Group (owner of NTV and Star TV; Star TV was acquired from Doğan in 2011).
- Ciner Media Group (owner of Habertürk TV and related outlets).
- Former assets of the Çukurova Group were transferred through interventions by the Savings Deposit Insurance Fund of Turkey (TMSF) and subsequently sold to pro-government businessmen in the 2010s.

Observers have noted that while ownership concentration was already significant in the 2000s, the post-2016 and especially post-2018 restructuring further reduced pluralism in terms of ownership diversity, even as the number of outlets remained high.

In 2018, the sale of the Doğan Group’s media assets to the Demirören Group marked a major shift in ownership concentration. The acquisition consolidated a substantial portion of mainstream media under ownership widely perceived as aligned with President Recep Tayyip Erdoğan and the ruling AKP.

Several outlets formerly owned by the Çukurova Holding were transferred through state intervention involving the Savings Deposit Insurance Fund of Turkey (TMSF) before being sold to pro-government businessmen.

Television accounts for roughly half of advertising revenues in Turkey, while print media’s share has steadily declined. Given the relatively limited size of the advertising market compared to the number of outlets, smaller and independent organisations face financial vulnerability, contributing to further consolidation.

The broadcast sector is regulated by the Radio and Television Supreme Council (RTÜK), the state authority responsible for licensing and content oversight. Critics argue that regulatory enforcement has disproportionately affected opposition and independent broadcasters.

Overall, although Turkey’s media landscape remains numerically diverse, observers frequently describe it as highly concentrated in ownership, politically polarised, and constrained in terms of independent journalism.

=== Print media ===
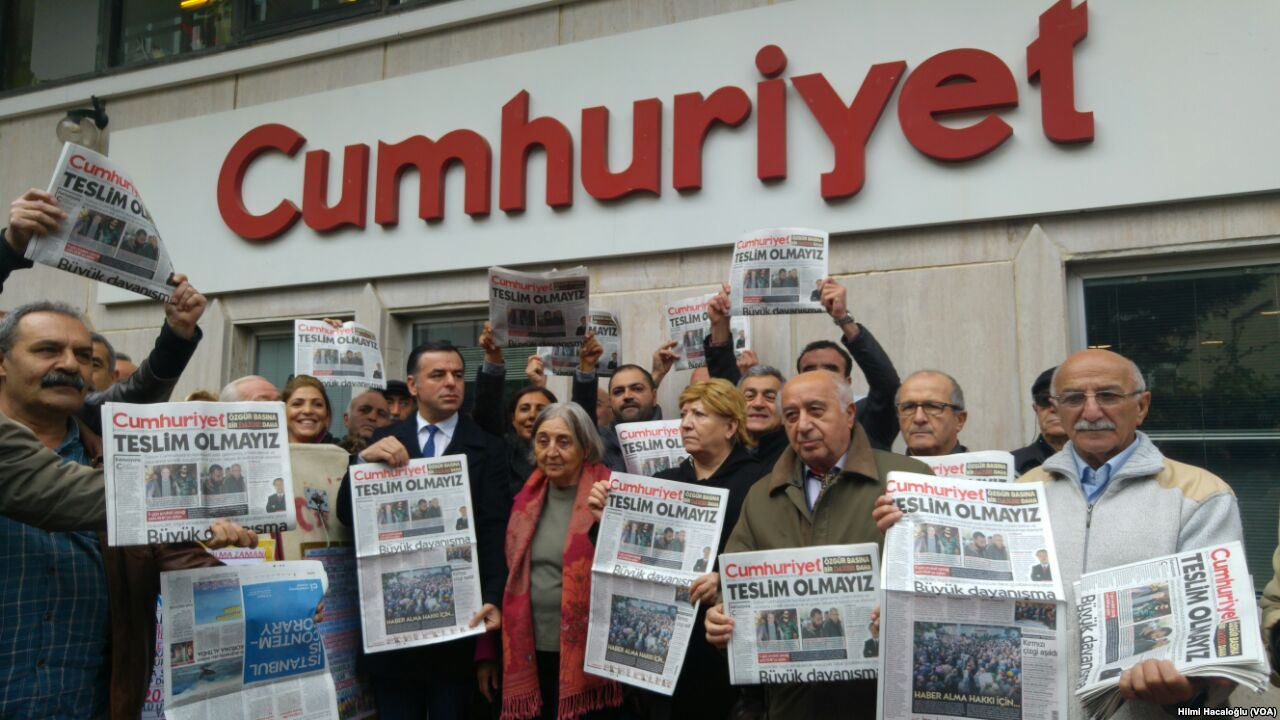
People protesting imprisonment of journalists from Cumhuriyet, 1 November 2016

Until 2017 and into mid-2018, a significant portion of Turkey’s print media was widely regarded as maintaining a relatively independent editorial line, with much of the mainstream press adopting a critical stance toward the government. However, during this period, the government of Turkey, the Erdoğan government intensified financial and regulatory pressure on major media conglomerates. Large tax fines and legal proceedings were imposed on prominent media owners, while the state-controlled Savings Deposit Insurance Fund of Turkey (TMSF) was used to seize and subsequently reassign several media assets.

These developments paved the way for pro-government business groups to acquire major media outlets. One of the most notable examples was the purchase of the Doğan Media Group by the Demirören Group, a conglomerate widely perceived as close to President Recep Tayyip Erdoğan.

The total number of readers of print media in Turkey is low, when compared to the big population of the country (95 newspapers per 1000 inhabitants). Circulating newspapers where estimated at 2,450 in 2010, of which 5 national, 23 regional and other local ones.

The media hubs of the country are Istanbul and Ankara. By circulation, the most popular daily newspapers are Hürriyet (330,000 daily sales in 2016), Sabah (300,000), Posta (290,000), Sözcü and Habertürk. Major Turkish daily newspapers are published every day of the year, including Sundays, religious and secular public holidays.

Big media conglomerates, with substantial interests in other economic sectors, dominate the media market and own all the major print and broadcast media. These are the Doğan Group, Turkuvaz Media Group, Ciner Group, Çukurova Group and Demirören Group:

- The Demirören Group is currently one of the largest Turkish media conglomerates, having acquired major assets of the former Doğan Group in 2018. It owns the mainstream daily Hürriyet, the boulevard daily Posta, the sports daily Fanatik (190,000), the business daily Referans (11,000), and the English-language daily Hürriyet Daily News (5,500).
- The Turkuvaz Group, owned by Çalık Holding, maintains close ties with the ruling AKP. It publishes the mainstream daily Sabah, the boulevard daily Takvim (approx. 120,000), the sports daily Fotomaç (approx. 200,000), and the prominent regional daily Yeni Asır (approx. 40,000).
- The Ciner Group launched Gazete Habertürk in March 2009.
- The Çukurova Group owns several nationalist-oriented publications, including Akşam (approx. 150,000), Tercüman (approx. 15,000), and the boulevard paper Güneş (approx. 110,000).
- The Albayrak group publishes the conservative Islamic daily Yeni Şafak (approx. 100,000), known for its pro-government editorial stance.
- Milli Gazete (approx. 50,000) continues as the voice of Milli Görüş, the ideology of religious-conservative parties, historically including Necmettin Erbakan’s National Salvation Party in the 1970s and the Welfare Party in the 1990s.
- Vakit (approx. 50,000) is a radical and sensationalist Islamic daily, which has faced multiple legal prosecutions.
- Cumhuriyet (approx. 55,000), historically linked to leftist movements, now serves as a reference for Kemalist and nationalist readers associated with the opposition CHP.
- Star (approx. 100,000) was launched by businessman Ethem Sancak as an Islamic-liberal daily and continues to maintain a pro-government editorial line.
- Yeni Akit (approx. 70,000) is a far-right Islamist daily known for strong pro-government positions and controversial coverage on social issues.
- BirGün (approx. 25,000) represents left-wing opposition perspectives, often critical of the AKP and Erdoğan government, and is considered one of the few remaining independent newspapers.

Magazines and periodicals too have a low circulation when compared with Turkey's population. The main ones are Tempo, Turkuvaz Group's Yeni Aktüel (8,000), and Newsweek Türkiye (5,000). Business magazines include Ekonomist and Para (around 9,000 copies each). Birikim is a well-reputed liberal-left journal, publishing elaborate articles on social and political issues. Satirical magazines have a long tradition in Turkey, with the first magazine (Diyojen) published in 1869. There are currently around 20 satirical magazines; the leading ones are Penguen (70,000 weekly circulation), LeMan (50,000) and Uykusuz. Historical examples include Oğuz Aral's magazine Gırgır (which reached a circulation of 500,000 in the 1970s) and Marko Paşa (launched 1946). Others include L-Manyak and Lombak.

Minority newspapers include IHO and Apoyevmatini in Greek language; Agos, Jamanak and Nor Marmara in Armenian language; and Şalom by the Jewish community. Their survival is often at stake.

Distribution networks are in the hands of Doğan Group’s Yay-Sat and Turkuvaz Group’s Turkuvaz Dağıtım Pazarlama.

=== Radio broadcasting ===
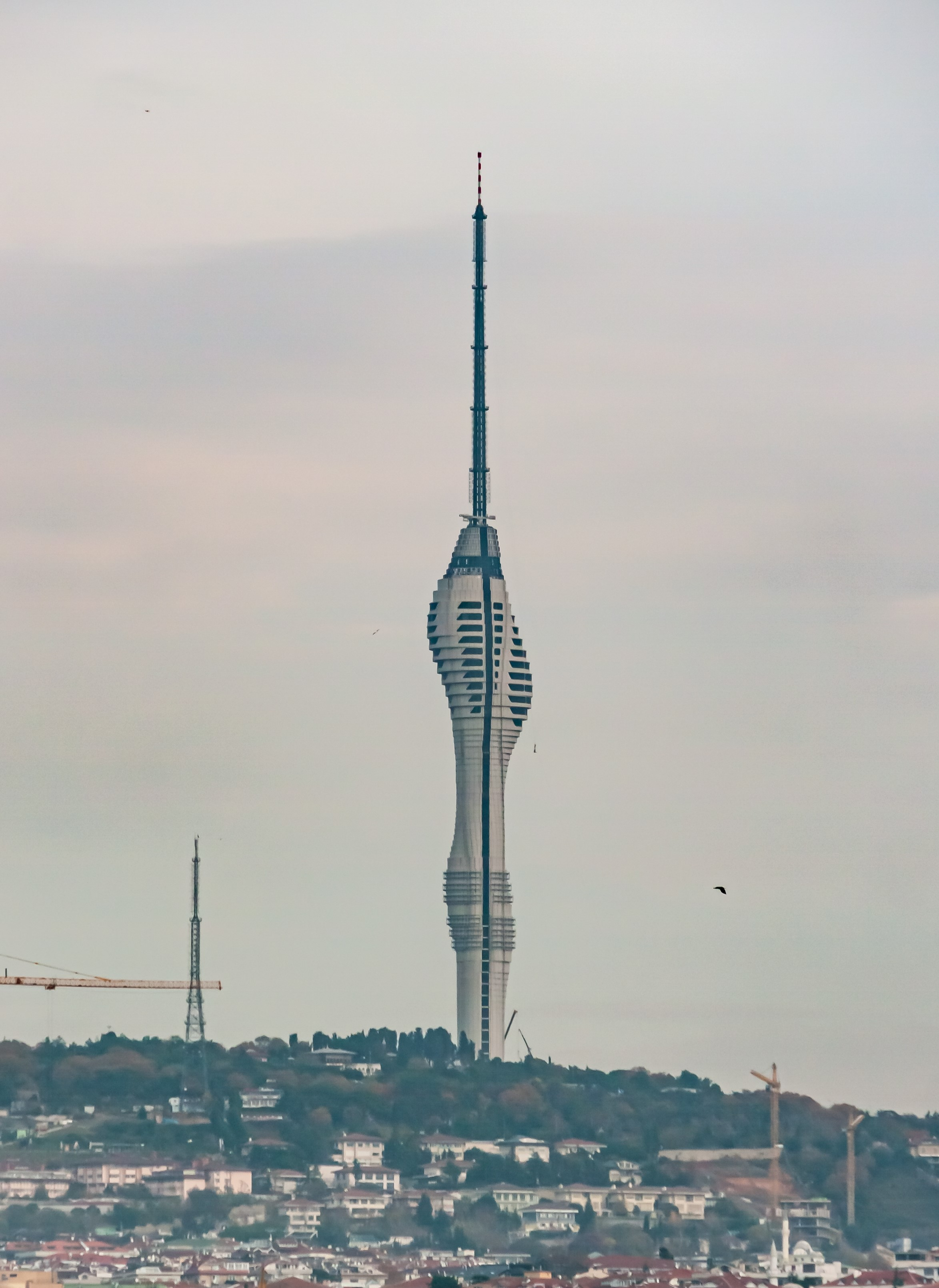
Küçük Çamlıca TV Radio Tower in Istanbul

Radio enjoys a large number of listeners in the Turkey. There are more than 1000 radio stations in the country. The first attempts at radio broadcasting began in 1921 in Istanbul, Turkey. The first radio broadcast in Turkey began on May 6, 1927. In 1927, New York City, London, Berlin, Vienna, Moscow and Tehran connection was established. In 1945, Turkey's first university radio with ITU Radio was established. First state radio, on May 1, 1964 TRT Radio began broadcasts, holding monopoly in radio broadcasting until 1994. Establishment of private radio stations began in the early 1990s by young visionary entrepreneurs. The first comers were Energy FM founded by Vedat Yelkenci who also launched the first Music Television TV channels Genc TV <https://tr.wikipedia.org/wiki/Genç_TV> and thereafter the Number One-MTV under licence by MTV Europe, Number one FM, launched by Omer Karacan and Ali Karacan, Genc Radyo launched by Osman Ataman, Power FM launched by Cem Hakko, Super FM and Kral FM launched by Cem Uzan, Capital Radio launched by Kalafatoglu. Internet radio in the late 1990s began to be established.

In 2010 Turkey had around 1,100 private radio stations, of which 100 available on cable - 36 national ones, 102 regional ones, and 950 local ones. TRT four radio channels include Radyo 1 (general), Radyo 2 (TRT-FM) (Turkish classical, folk and pop music), Radyo 3 (primarily classical music and also jazz, polyphonic and western pop music, broadcasts news in English, French and German), and Radyo 4 (Turkish Music). TRT's international radio service Türkiye‘nin Sesi / Voice of Turkey broadcasts in 26 languages. TRT also has 10 regional radio stations.

Private radio stations offer mainly music programmes; the most popular ones are Kral FM (Turkish pop music), Süper FM (Western pop music), Metro FM (Western pop music), Power Türk (Turkish pop music), and Best FM (Turkish pop music). Several independent radio stations also broadcast in Turkey, including Istanbul's Açık Radyo (Open Radio), the first to be financially supported by listeners, and encouraging listeners to participate in public discussions on sensitive issues to promote open dialogue.

An Armenian-language internet radio, Nor Radio, started broadcasting in 2009.

=== Television broadcasting ===
First national channel TRT 1

Television is the primary source of information and entertainment in Turkey. According to surveys by the Radio and Television Supreme Council (RTÜK), average daily television viewing time has historically been around 3–4 hours per person.

Television broadcasting in Turkey was introduced in 1968 by the state broadcaster Turkish Radio and Television Corporation (TRT), preceded by experimental broadcasts by ITU TV in 1952. Color television was introduced in 1981. TRT maintained a state monopoly for approximately two decades. On 26 May 1989, Turkey’s first private television channel, Star TV, began broadcasting from Germany, effectively bypassing domestic restrictions. The constitutional amendment of August 1993 formally ended TRT’s monopoly and liberalised private broadcasting.

Throughout the 1990s and 2000s, the number of broadcasters expanded rapidly. By 2010, Turkey had 24 national, 16 regional and more than 200 local television stations. The market came to be dominated by a handful of major national channels, including Kanal D, ATV, Show TV and Star TV.

Ownership concentration increased significantly after 2018. The sale of the Doğan Group’s media assets to the Demirören Group transferred ownership of major outlets including Kanal D and CNN Türk to a conglomerate widely regarded as close to President Recep Tayyip Erdoğan and the ruling AKP. The Turkuvaz Media Group (owned by Çalık Holding) controls ATV, while the Ciner Group operates Habertürk TV. The Doğuş Media Group owns NTV and previously acquired Star TV in 2011. Several outlets formerly owned by the Çukurova Group were transferred via the Savings Deposit Insurance Fund of Turkey (TMSF) before being sold to pro-government businessmen.

The public broadcaster TRT operates multiple national and thematic channels, including TRT 1, TRT 2, TRT Haber, TRT Spor, TRT Müzik, and the Kurdish-language TRT Kurdi (launched in 2009 as part of reforms related to minority broadcasting). TRT also operates international channels such as TRT World, TRT Türk and TRT Avaz.

Thematic and 24-hour news channels include NTV, CNN Türk (a joint venture with CNN International), Habertürk TV, TGRT Haber and A Haber. Music channels include Kral TV and Number One TV. Observers have noted a tendency toward content homogenisation, with popular formats frequently replicated across competing networks.

Reception platforms are primarily terrestrial, satellite and cable. By the late 2000s, nearly half of Turkish households used satellite reception, including pay-TV services. The main multi-channel platforms include Digiturk, D-Smart and the cable provider Türksat.

The broadcast sector is regulated by RTÜK, which oversees licensing and content compliance. Critics argue that regulatory decisions and financial penalties have disproportionately affected opposition broadcasters, contributing to further consolidation and reduced pluralism in the television market.

=== Cinema ===
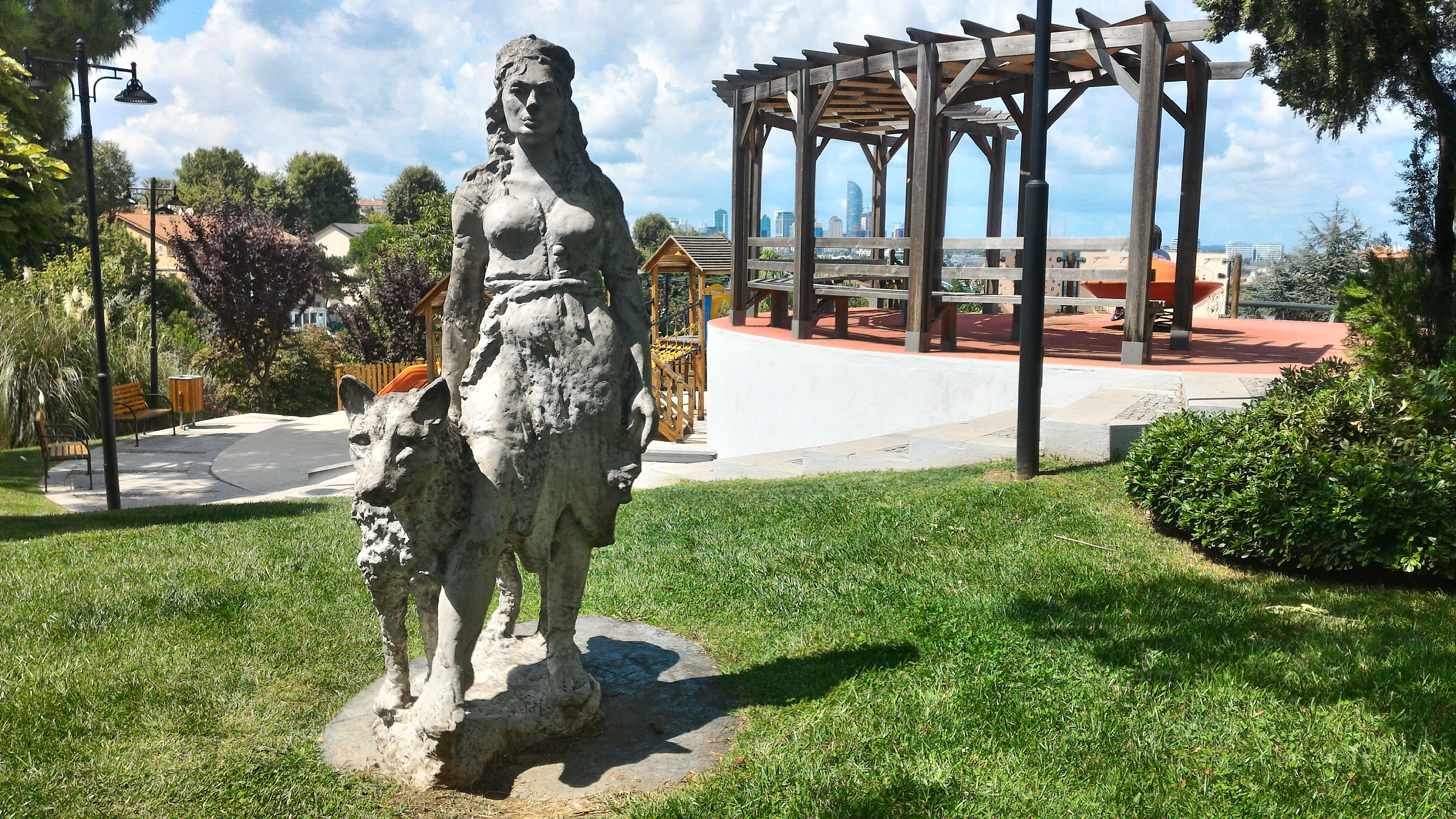
Statue of Türkan Şoray. She is known as "Sultan" of the Cinema of Turkey.

The Turkish film art and industry, or Yeşilçam (Green Pine), is an important part of Turkish culture, and has flourished over the years, delivering entertainment to audiences in Turkey, expatriates across Europe, and more recently prospering in the Arab world and in rare cases, the United States. The first movie exhibited in the Ottoman Empire was the Lumiere Brothers' 1895 film, L'Arrivée d'un train en gare de La Ciotat, which was shown in Istanbul in 1896. The first Turkish-made film was a documentary entitled Ayastefanos'taki Rus Abidesinin Yıkılışı (Demolition of the Russian Monument at San Stefano), directed by Fuat Uzkınay and completed in 1914. The first narrative film, Sedat Simavi's The Spy, was released in 1917. Turkey's first sound film was shown in 1931.

The number of cinema spectator has risen since 2000, in parallel to economic growth, political liberalisation and improved quality of theatres. In 2009, around 255 movies were distributed in Turkey, with a reach of 35 million, of which 70 Turkish movies, which capitalised half of the audience. The cinema audience though remains below European average, and limited to the main cities.

40 movies are produced yearly in Turkey. Award-winning Turkish films have often been supported by the European Union Eurimages film fund and by the Turkish Ministry of Culture, sometimes attracting more audience abroad than domestically. Two Turkish film companies have been bought by foreign investors in 2007 (Cinemars by USA's Colony Capital and AFM by Eurasia Cinemas from Russia).

=== Digital Press ===
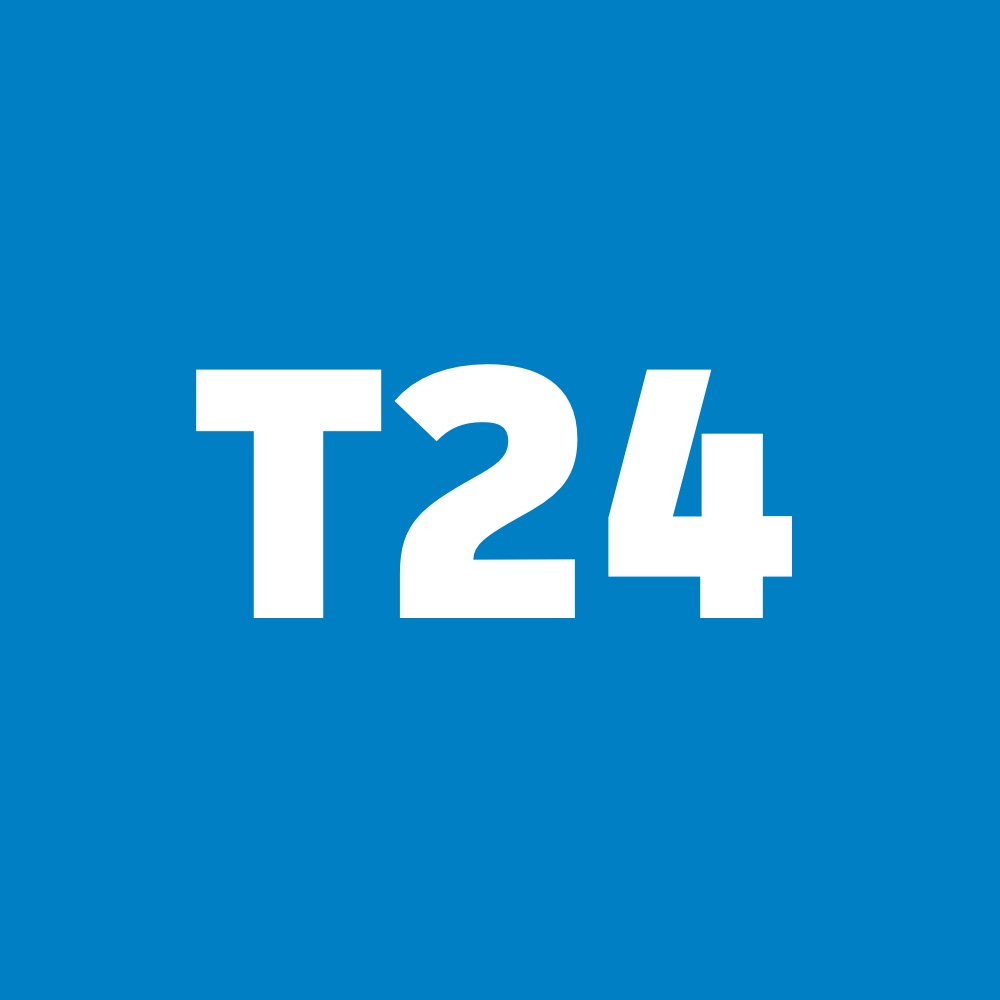
T24 is a digital-based news website.

When it comes to digital broadcasting and the press, according to the Reuters Institute for the Study of Journalism, digital media is the primary source of news in Turkey, with 71% of Turks using it to access news, while 49% use social media as their primary news source. The Government of Turkey also introduced a regulatory law called the "Regulation on the Presentation of Radio, Television, and On-Demand Broadcasts on the Internet," granting the Radio and Television Supreme Council (RTÜK) the authority to require "media service providers" to obtain broadcasting licenses.

National broadcasters that operate primarily through the internet in Turkey include T24, bianet, Diken, Gazete Duvar, Gazeteport, and OdaTV.

Foreign broadcasters that provide Turkish-language news coverage primarily through the internet in Turkey include Euronews Türkçe, BBC Türkçe, and DW Türkçe.

=== Telecommunications ===
Türk Telekom was established in 1995 as a state-owned company after the separation of postal and telecommunication services. It was privatized in 2005 (55% Oger Telecom, 30% state-owned, 15% public shares). In March 2009 it hosted 17.3 million land line phone users, 6 million ADSL users, and 12.6 million GSM users.

The telecommunications liberalisation process started in Turkey in 2004 after the creation of the Telecommunication Authority, and is still ongoing as of May 2013. Private sector companies operate in mobile telephony, long distance telephony and Internet access. There were 16.5 million fixed phone lines, 62.8 million mobile phone subscribers, and 6.2 million broadband subscribers by December 2009.

Telecommunications liberalisation in Turkey is progressing, but at a slow pace. The Telecommunication Authority (now renamed Bilgi İletişim ve Teknolojileri Kurumu or BTK), while technically an independent organization, is still controlled by the Ministry of Transport and Communications.

While progress is being made (for example, local as well as long distance calls are now open to competition), the incumbent has so far managed in many areas to restrict access and protect its monopoly. For example, wholesale line rental is still not available to alternative operators, making it necessary for subscribers to pay two bills (one for line rental to the incumbent, and one to the chosen operator). The incumbent has so far managed to prevent any operator from connecting its own fiber optic cable at local loop unbundling exchanges, though it is technically required to allow this. Recently, the incumbent announced it is acquiring Invitel, one of only two other players in the inter-city capacity business, raising questions as to how the Turkish Competition Board will treat the acquisition.

The lack of progress by the BTK in ensuring a competitive playing field can be evidenced by the market share the incumbent still holds. In broadband, the incumbent's provider still occupies roughly 95% share of the market. The Governmental Audit Office of the President (T.C. Cumhurbaşkanlığı Devlet Denetleme Kurulu) issued a highly critical report of the BTK in February 2010, listing 115 findings to be addressed. For example, the report found #20 points out that the BTK has completed only 50% to 78% of its stated work plans in each of the years from 2005 to 2008.

Alternative operators are rapidly growing, yet much progress needs to be made by the BTK to improve the competitive landscape.

The political authority is the Ministry of Transport, Maritime and Communication . But there are also two supreme councils; Radio and Television Supreme Council (RTÜK) and Information and Communication Technologies Authority (BTK). While internet and point to point telecommunication is controlled by BTK, radio and television broadcast is controlled by RTÜK.

=== Internet ===
The Internet in Turkey has been available to the public since 1993, although experimentation at Ege University started in 1987. The first available connections were dial-up. Cable Internet has been available since 1998 and ADSL since 2001. As of January 2024, Turkey had approximately 74.4 million internet users, representing an internet penetration rate of 86.5 percent of the population. According to the Turkish Statistical Institute (TÜİK), 88.8 percent of individuals aged 16 to 74 used the internet in 2024.

== Media organizations ==
=== Media agencies ===
The main news agencies in Turkey are Anadolu Ajansı (AA), Demirören Haber Ajansı (DHA), İhlas Haber Ajansı (İHA), Ajans HaberTürk (Ciner Group) and ANKA. They often have access to expensive technical facilities thanks to being embedded in big media conglomerates.

- Anadolu Ajansı (AA) was founded by Mustafa Kemal Pasha in 1920 during Turkey's independence war, and remains the official state-subsidized news agency. It has 28 offices in Turkey and 22 abroad, providing 800 news items and 200 photos daily.
- Demirören Haber Ajansı (DHA), formerly owned by the Doğan Media Group and called Doğan Haber Ajansı, was founded in 1999. It is owned by the Demirören Group. In 2011 it had 41 offices in Turkey and 26 abroad.
- ANKA was founded in 1972 as an independent news agency; it provides a daily economic bulletin in Turkish and a weekly one in English.
- Dicle Haber Ajansı (DİHA) is an independent news agency established in 2002, providing services in Turkish, English and Kurdish.
- Foreign news agencies also operate in Turkey.

=== Trade unions ===
Part of the reason for journalistic weakness vis-a-vis owners is the lack of unions, as the International Federation of Journalists and European Federation of Journalists noted in 2002:

At the beginning of 1990s, workers of two major newspapers, Hürriyet and Milliyet, resigned from the union because of pressure from the employer (Aydin Dogan). Hostility from employers meant that some workplaces where there had been union organisation (including, for example, Tercüman, Günes, and the privately owned UBA news agency) were closed down. Union organisation was not possible in newspapers (Star, Radikal, and others) nor in radio and television companies which began their publication and broadcasting lives later on. The Sabah group and other media groups have never permitted union organisation. (IFJ/EFJ, 2002: 4)

Turkey's 2001 financial crisis further strengthened media owners' hands, as 3–5,000 journalists were fired, and the most troublesome ones targeted first.

Media professionals in Turkey face job insecurity and lack of social security, being often forced to work without contract and outside the protection provided by the Law 212 on the rights of journalists. Without a contact under Law 212 media workers in Turkey cannot obtain a press badge and cannot take part in the Turkish Journalists Union (Türkiye Gazeteciler Sendikası, TGS), the only union recognised as a counterpart for the negotiation of the category's collective contract. TGS' influence has diminished since the 1990s, under pressure from the media owners, and today journalists are cautious about union membership, in order to avoid retaliation from employers.

Despite low levels of unionisation, many journalists' associations exist, including Türkiye Gazeteciler Cemiyeti (Journalists Association of Turkey), Türkiye Gazeteciler Federasyonu (Federation of Journalists), Çağdaş Gazeteciler Derneği (Progressive Journalists Association), Ekonomi Muhabirleri Derneği (Association of Economy Reporters), Foto Muhabirleri Derneği (Association of Photo Reporters), and Parlamento Muhabirleri Derneği (Association of Parliamentary Reporters).

Employers organisations include Televizyon Yayıncıları Derneği (Association of Television Broadcasters), Anadolu Gazete Radyo ve Televizyon Yayıncıları Birliği (Union of Anatolian Newspaper, Radio and Television Publishers and Broadcasters), Televizyon Yayıncıları Birliği (Union of Television Broadcasters), Yayıncılar Birliği (Turkish Publishers’ Association).

The advertising sector include the Turkish Association of Advertising Agencies (TAAA) (Reklamcılar Derneği), Association of Advertisers (Reklamverenler Derneği) and IAA Turkey (International Advertising Association).

=== Regulatory authorities ===
The Radio and Television Supreme Council (RTÜK) is the government body overseeing the broadcast media. It was established after the end of the state monopoly over broadcasting, with the Radio and Television Law no. 3984 in April 1994. It is tasked with assigning frequencies and issuing broadcasting permits and licenses to private companies, as well as monitoring their compliance with the legal framework. It has the power to issue penalties for non-compliance, ranging from warnings to the suspension of broadcastings (after complaints, since 2002 it can suspend single programmes rather than only the whole channel). It has no authority over the public service broadcaster TRT, which is subject to a separate law (no. 2954).

Broadcasting standards set by RTÜK are seen as too wide and vague, as in “not violating the national and moral values of the community and the Turkish family structure”, “not undermining the state and its independence and the indisputable unity of the country with its people” and “not undermining the ideals and reforms of Atatürk”. Its interpretation of the law has been both arbitrary and severe, with disproportionate sanctions for non-compliers. RTÜK's claim of impartiality is undermined by its composition and nomination process, leading to strong risks of politicisation and control by the party in government. The body members are elected by the Parliament, and are currently dominated by affiliates of the ruling AKP. According to Bianet, in 2014 RTÜK issued 78 warnings and 254 fines to television channels, and 12 warnings and 7 fines to radio stations.

Since 2002, in order to regulate the frequencies, RTÜK partners with the Communications High Council HYK, founded in 1983 to approve communication policies, and the Telecommunication Authority TK, established in 2000 to regulate and control the telecommunication sector. TK is tasked with frequency planning, yet frequency auctions have often been unsuccessful due to lack of coordination between the three bodies as well as outside pressures from media conglomerates. The MGK (National Security Council) also intervened to oblige broadcasters to acquire a national security clearance document, in order to prevent the establishment of religious TV channels. In 2010 all radio and TV stations continued operating without licenses. As long as Turkish media operate without licenses, RTÜK cannot enact its powers and force media groups to sell their shares to prevent dominant positions and reduce media ownership concentration.

The Advertising Self-Regulatory Board (Reklam Özdenetim Kurulu) was established by the members of the Advertisers Association, TAAA and by the media institutions in order to monitor advertising practices. TİAK (Television Audience Research Committee), BİAK (Press Research Committee), and RİAK (Radio Audience Research. Committee) are established to organise and monitor research about broadcasting and print media.

BIA is a non-for-profit organization that monitors and reports violations of freedom of expression, monitors the newspapers’ coverage about human rights, woman and children rights issues, and the functioning of the media in terms of media ethics. Its news and information network Bianet provides daily coverage of the issues that are ignored in the mainstream media, especially about human rights, gender rights, minority rights and children rights issues. Bianet has also an English version.

== Censorship and media freedom ==
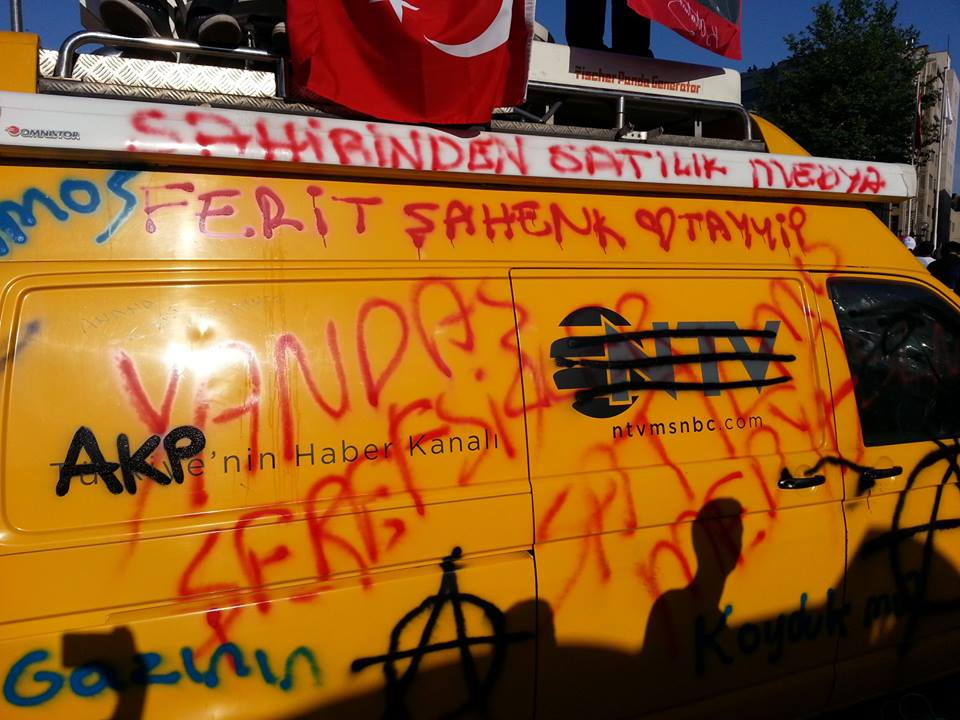
NTV broadcast van covered with protest graffiti during the 2013 protests in Turkey, in response to relative lack of coverage of mainstream media of the protests, 1 June 2013

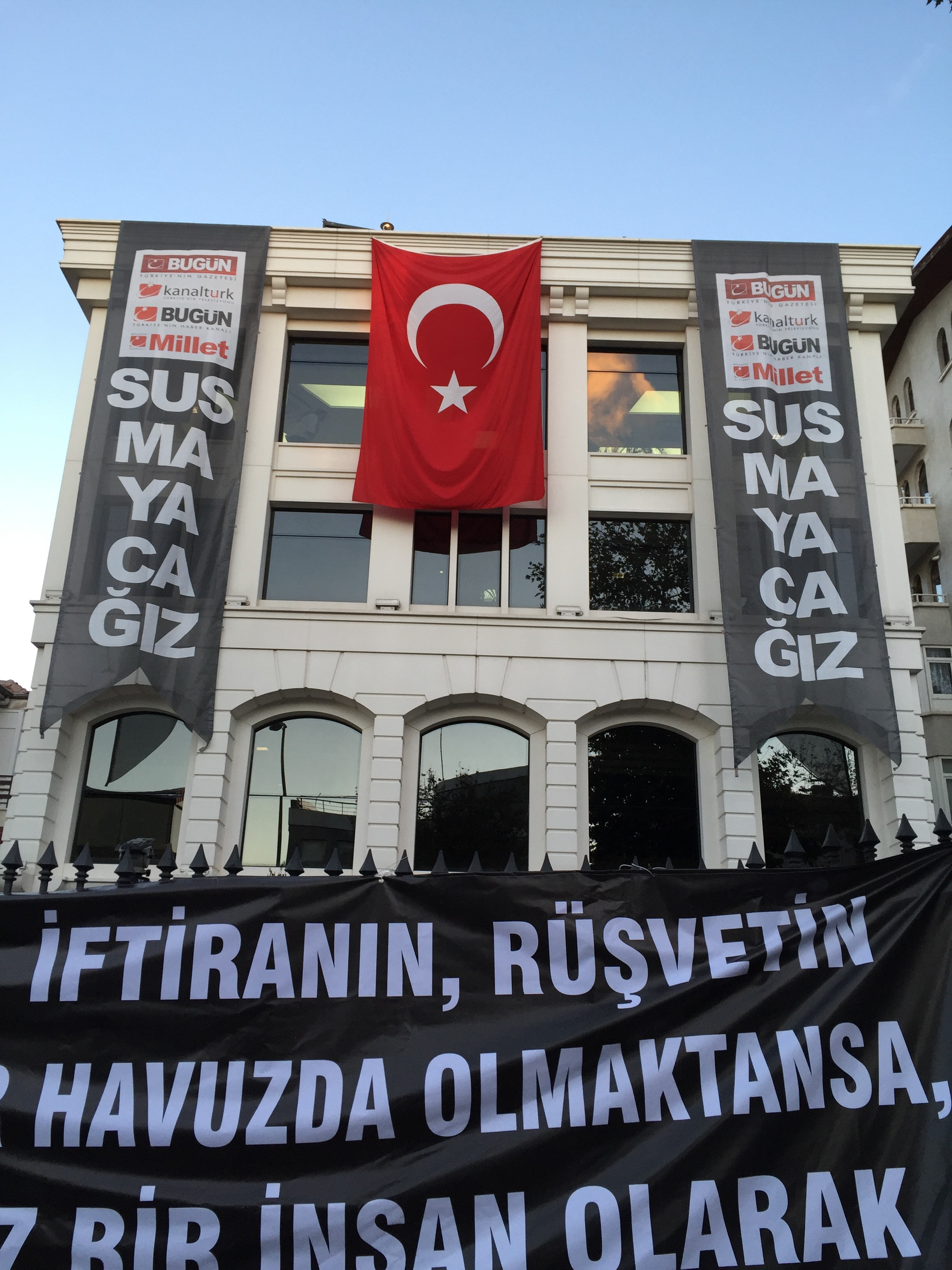
Protest banners at the headquarters of raided media company Koza İpek

Since 2011, the AKP government has increased restrictions on freedom of speech, freedom of the press and internet use, and television content, as well as the right to free assembly. It has also developed links with media groups, and used administrative and legal measures (including, in one case, a billion tax fine) against critical media groups and critical journalists: "over the last decade the AKP has built an informal, powerful, coalition of party-affiliated businessmen and media outlets whose livelihoods depend on the political order that Erdogan is constructing. Those who resist do so at their own risk."

These behaviours became particularly prominent in 2013 in the context of the Turkish media coverage of the 2013 protests in Turkey. The BBC noted that while some outlets are aligned with the AKP or are personally close to Erdogan, "most mainstream media outlets - such as TV news channels HaberTurk and NTV, and the major centrist daily Milliyet - are loth to irritate the government because their owners' business interests at times rely on government support. All of these have tended to steer clear of covering the demonstrations." Few channels provided live coverage – one that did was Halk TV.

During its 12-year rule, the ruling AKP has gradually expanded its control over media. Today, numerous newspapers, TV channels and internet portals also dubbed as Yandaş Medya ("Slanted Media") or Havuz Medyası ("Pool Media") continue their heavy pro-government propaganda. Several media groups receive preferential treatment in exchange for AKP-friendly editorial policies. Some of these media organizations were acquired by AKP-friendly businesses through questionable funds and processes. Media not friendly to AKP, on the other hand, are threatened with intimidation, inspections and fines. These media group owners face similar threats to their other businesses. An increasing number of columnists have been fired for criticizing the AKP leadership.

Leaked telephone calls between high ranking AKP officials and businessmen indicate that government officials collected money from businessmen in order to create a "pool media" that will support AKP government at any cost. Arbitrary tax penalties are assessed to force newspapers into bankruptcy—after which they emerge, owned by friends of the president. According to a recent investigation by Bloomberg, Erdogan forced a sale of the once independent daily Sabah to a consortium of businessmen led by his son-in-law.

The state-run Anadolu Agency and the Turkish Radio and Television Corporation have also been criticized by media outlets and opposition parties, for acting more and more like a mouthpiece for the ruling AKP, a stance in stark violation of their requirement as public institutions to report and serve the public in an objective way.

In the aftermath of the 2016 coup attempt, all media outlets considered to have been linked to the Gülen movement were shut down by the Turkish government. These include the newspapers Zaman (formerly the highest-circulation paper in Turkey) and Taraf, Cihan News Agency, Samanyolu TV and numerous others. Later in the same year, some pro-Kurdish media outlets, such as IMC TV, were also shut down for allegedly supporting the PKK.

== Former publications ==
In the post-Tanzimat period French became a common language among educated people, even though no ethnic group in the empire natively spoke French. Johann Strauss, author of "Language and power in the late Ottoman Empire," wrote that "In a way reminiscent of English in the contemporary world, French was almost omnipresent in the Ottoman lands." Strauss also stated that French was "a sort of semi-official language", which "to some extent" had "replaced Turkish as an 'official' language for non-Muslims". Therefore, late empire had multiple French-language publications, and several continued to operate when the Republic of Turkey was declared in 1923. However French-language publications began to close in the 1930s.

From 1923 onwards:

- İctihâd - Idjtihad. Türkçe ve Fransızca, ilmi, edebi, iktisadi
- T. C. İzmir Ticaret ve Sanayi Odası Mecmuası - République de Turque Bulletin de la Chambre de Commerce et d'Industrie de Smyrne
- Revue commerciale du Levant (Constantinople, with the entire city named Istanbul in Turkish in 1923 and renamed Istanbul in English circa 1930) - of the French chamber of commerce

== See also ==
- List of magazines in Turkey
- List of newspapers in Turkey
- List of television stations in Turkey
- List of radio stations in Turkey
- Censorship in Turkey
- Transparency of media ownership in Turkey
- Concentration of media ownership in Turkey
- Media censorship and disinformation during the 2013–14 protests in Turkey
- Turkey's media purge after the failed July 2016 coup d'état
- Conspiracy theories in Turkey
- Media of the Ottoman Empire
