= Concentration of media ownership in Turkey =

Media ownership in Turkey is highly concentrated. According to experts, Turkish media ownership structure prevents citizens from receiving reliable information.

In Turkey, 40% of all media are owned by eight media groups. Half of these top media owners have investments in at least three out of four media types (radio, TV, newspapers and online web portals). The top media owners, Doğan and Kalyon Groups, have investments in all four media types and share 10% and 7% of all media audience respectively. These groups are followed by Demirören Group (6%), Ciner Group (5%), Doğuş Group (4%) and state-owned Turkish Radio and Television (TRT) (3%).

Among the shareholders of companies that own the top 40 media outlets, most are commercial corporations. The conglomerates they own (Doğan, Doğuş, Demirören, Ciner, Albayrak, Turkuvaz/Zirve/Kalyon, İhlas and Ethem Sancak companies) operate in sectors such as construction, energy, mining and tourism. Some of them have won major public tenders in the past few years, ranging from the third airport in Istanbul to metro construction and urban redevelopment projects.

== Media landscape ==
Experts state that it is almost impossible to get access to basic financial data on the Turkish media market. Therefore, most of the information on concentration of media ownership rely on news analyses, secondary sources and the analysis of the concentration of media audience.

As to the radio in Turkey, there are 36 national, 102 regional, 952 local radio stations totalling 1090. The public broadcast Turkish Radio and Television (TRT) held the radio monopoly until 1992. Currently, it holds two radio stations in the top 10 list of radios dominating the sector. Instead, among media groups, Doğan Group (Radyo D, Slow Türk, CNN Türk) and Doğuş Group (Kral FM, NTV Radio, Kral Pop Radio, Kral World Radio) are the two media companies dominating the sector, with 2 radio stations each in the top 10 list.

With regard to the television landscape, in Turkey there are 108 television channels and 83 radio-TVs in total; 14 of which are national, 11 regional, 83 local. Public broadcast Turkish Radio and Television Corporation (TRT), owns 13 channels in total. TRT held the monopoly in television broadcasting until the 1990s. Star 1, the first private TV station, was founded in 1990. The first law for private broadcasting was enacted in 1993. At the moment, out of the top 10 TV channels that hold the most audience six belong to Doğuş, Doğan and Kalyon Groups.

As to print media, according to the Turkish Statistical Institute (TÜİK) 172 national, 112 regional and 2.447 local newspapers were published in 2015, totalling 2.731. According to data achieved from the Press Advertisement Institution (Basın İlan Kurumu- BİK), Doğan and Kalyon Groups both own two among the most popular Turkish dailies. İhlas Group, Estetik Yayıncılık, Ciner Group, Demirören Group, Albayrak Group and Ethem Sancak own one newspaper each. Except for Doğan's Hürriyet and Posta, and Burak Akbay's Sözcü, all newspapers in the top 10 list belong to groups that are close to the ruling AKP. All owners except for one (Burak Akbay) have major investments outside of media that depend on state contracts. BirGün and Cumhuriyet- two critical newspapers with an independent editorial policy- are owned, respectively: by various unions, NGOs and sponsors and by the Cumhuriyet Foundation.

With regard to online media, most of the alternative online news platforms survive with the assistance of European Union's funds and by raising donations. For instance, the Independent Communication Network Bianet, is mainly funded by the EU Initiative for Democracy and Human Rights.

As to news agencies, the largest news agency in Turkey- Anadolu Agency (AA)- is a joint stock company which was founded by the state of Turkey. Its shares are owned by the Undersecretariat of Treasury.

== Legal framework ==
The issue of concentration of media ownership is regulated in Turkey both by sector-specific regulations and by competition law.

The international standards the Turkish system should refer to in the field of media pluralism and diversity, are those developed by the Council of Europe, which defines pluralism and diversity in terms of structural (ownership) diversity in the media market and in terms of pluralism of ideas and cultural diversity.

=== Broadcasting sector ===
Media concentration is regulated under Law No. 6112 on Establishment of Radio and Television Enterprises and their Media Services (2011), for audio-visual media. The Turkish Competition Authority (Rekabet Kurumu) is entitled to take action against distortion of competition according to another law, i.e. the Law on the Protection of Competition.

Therefore, as for the broadcasting sector there are sector-specific regulatory safeguards against a high horizontal concentration. For instance, the Law requires companies that are about to take over or merge with others to seek permission from the Radio and Television Supreme Council (Radyo ve Televizyon Üst Kurulu- RTÜK) and to inform it about transactions not later than 30 days after their completion. The regulatory framework also foresees a monitoring (administrative or judicial authority) and a sanctioning system. The sanctioning/enforcement system foresees the imposition of proportionate remedies against breaches of regulation. Possible remedial measures include:

- Refusal of additional licences;
- Blocking of a merger or acquisition;
- Obligation to allocate windows for third party programming;
- Obligation to give up licences/activities in other media sectors;
- Divestiture.

However, these remedies are not always effectively used. Law No. 6112 increased the limit of foreign shareholding rate in the broadcasting sector: the cap was raised from 25 to 50%. It fastly led to national and international mergers: for instance, Discovery Communications entered into a partnership with Doğus Media Group. The latter will be responsible for broadcasting Discovery Channel, Animal Planet and Discovery Planet. Also, Digiturk was acquired by BeIN Media Group, which led among other things to the entrance of the Al Jazeera Media Network in the Turkish media landscape.

=== Print ===
In the realm of print media, regulatory safeguards on media ownership concentration and a monitoring authority do exist under Law No. 5187 (2004), but there is no respective sanctioning system. Consequently, sanctioning and enforcement powers are not used.

=== Online media ===
There is no specific regulation for the concentration of media ownership in the online sector. Such sector falls under the scope of the Competition Authority. However, the Radio and Television Supreme Council (RTÜK) decisions on concentration of media service providers are not public. Therefore, monitoring whether media service providers notified the RTÜK for a share transfer or not is impossible to determine.

=== Regulatory authorities ===
Radio and Television Supreme Council (RTÜK) is the authority for the regulation and supervision of radio, television and on demand media services. For online and print media, the supervising and sanctioning authority is the Turkish Competition Authority. According to a 2011 TESEV (Turkish Economic and Social Studies Foundation) Report, due to the high number of complaints that are submitted to this authority, only 10% of them have been taken into consideration.

According to an expert, appointment processes for RTÜK should be re-structured as to minimize political influence over appointments.

== Cross-ownership ==
Cross-ownership refers to the concentration of ownership in different media sectors (i.e. across TV– Print– Radio– Online).

In 2002, Law No. 4756 removed many cross-ownership restrictions, allowing, for example, a media company to own 244 local and regional and 30 national stations all at once.

In the 2016 survey by MOM (Media Ownership Monitor), cross-ownership concentration in Turkey is measured by adding and weighting the market shares of the Top 8 owners across all sectors. The top eight owners of media in Turkey share approximately 40% of the cross-media audience in the country which results in a low risk for media ownership concentration, as to the MOM's parameters. Half of the top media owners have investments in at least three media sectors.

The same company can only provide one radio, one television and one on demand broadcast service, and a real person or a legal entity can directly or indirectly hold shares in a maximum of four media service providers. However, in the event a real person or legal entity holds shares in more than one media service provider, the annual total commercial communication income of media service providers in which a real person or a legal entity is a direct or indirect shareholder cannot exceed thirty per cent of the total commercial communication income of the media sector.

== Concentration of media audience ==
The horizontal concentration of audience and readership across media platforms as to July 2016 has been measured by the Media Ownership Monitor Turkey project. Concentration was measured by using the Top 4 largest audience share for each media type.

As to audience concentration in television, the survey found a medium level of concentration (44%). Out of the four top media owners in the market, three are considered generally to be pro-government. The channels of the public broadcaster TRT hold 11% of the shares. With regard to audience concentration in television, the survey again found a medium level of concentration (44%). 11% of the shared are owned by state-run channels while 21% by the pro-government Doğuş Media Group. With regard to the print sector, the Media Ownership Monitor survey shows that the level of audience concentration is high (59%). Similarly, there is a high audience concentration in the online sector (55%): online media outlets largely coincide with major print outlets in Turkey. 10 out of 15 online news portals with a high audience, are web sites of print or TV outlets.

== Political and economic influence on media owners ==
Links between media owners and other actors operating in the economic and/or in the political sphere may lead to undue pressures and influences on the editorial policies of media organizations.

With regard to political influences, since 2011- under Law No. 6112 on Broadcasters- broadcasting licenses can no longer be allocated to political parties, labor or employer unions, professional associations, cooperatives, foundations, local government bodies, companies established or partially owned by these institutions or financial institutions, and real and corporate entities that partially own these intermediary institutions. However, despite legal provisions, according to an expert, political clientelism in the media field has been at its peak for the last decade.

After the 1980s, the media ownership structure changed dramatically due to the liberal economic politics under the Prime Minister Turgut Özal: businessmen from a non-journalism background acquired key media outlets or launched new ones. The ban on media conglomerates' bidding in public tenders was removed in 2001.

As to the 2016 survey by MOM (Media Ownership Monitor), the share of TV media owned by politically affiliated entities results in 52%, that of radio channels in 40%, for newspapers is 52% and for online media 52%. In some cases -such as that of Doğuş Media and Doğan Media - political affiliations of media owners/executives have come to light through wiretaps or leaked correspondence allegedly between media owners/executives and government officials.

With regard to the economic influence, most of the shareholders of companies that own the top 40 media outlets are commercial corporations. According to an expert, one of the reasons why big conglomerates are almost the only owners in the media market is a consequence of the government's intolerance toward criticism. Such intolerance to criticism, which heavily influenced the work of media actors’ working attitudes and made it impossible for them media outlets to be seen as reliable sources of news by the public. Therefore, it rendered it very difficult for them and therefore to reach have an economical sustainability for their media businesses.from the media businesses. Thus, only big media conglomerates, in such a context, can sustain such a non-profitable activity, thanks to the profits they can gain from other business activities they are involved in. These conglomerates (Doğan, Doğuş, Demirören, Ciner, Albayrak, Turkuvaz/Zirve/Kalyon, İhlas and Ethem Sancak companies) operate in sectors such as banking, construction, energy, mining and tourism. Some of them, such as the Albayrak group, Turkuvaz/Zirve/Kalyon group, İhlas group and Doğuş have won major public tenders in the past few years, ranging from the third airport in Istanbul to metro construction and urban redevelopment projects on a neighbourhood scale.

Throughout 2015 and 2016, government's trustees were appointed to allegedly Gulenist-affiliated media outlets and companies. For instance, a takeover took place in October 26, 2015 for the Koza-Ipek Media Group, which owned, among others, Bugun and Millet dailies and Cihan News Agency. Similarly, trustees were appointed on March 5, 2016, for Feza Holding, the media holding publishing, among others, the most read newspaper in Turkey, Zaman, and the English-language daily Today's Zaman. The assets of these companies are currently under the jurisdiction of the government's Savings Deposit Insurance Fund (TMSF), and it is not clear if the companies will be either dissolved or sold off.

After the July 2016 coup attempt, a state of emergency was declared. Under emergency decree No. 687 of February 9, 2017, Turkey's Saving Deposit Insurance Fund (TMSF) will be authorized to sell companies seized by the state through the appointment of trustees. Also, through the use of emergency decrees- such as Nos. 668 (July 27, 2016), 675 (October 29, 2016) and 677 (November 22, 2016), 178 media organizations were closed down being charged of having terrorist affiliations. As to November 2016, Twenty-four of these shut-down media organizations were radio stations, twenty- eight televisions, eighty newspapers.

== Influence of Advertising Financing ==
As advertising is an important income for media providers and the allocation of advertisements may influence editorial policies or weaken certain media rather than others, media service providers (broadcasters) shall report their monthly commercial advertisement income to the RTÜK, by the 20th day of the following month.

The distribution of public funds on advertising is existentially an important source of income for smaller papers but the relative data remain hidden. For instance, the request of information on this topic by the Media Ownership Monitor was refused by the Turkish Right to Information Assessment Council, citing “trade secrets” as a reason.

Following the coup attempt, on October 5, 2016, regulations regarding the Press Advertising Institution (Basın İlan Kurumu- BİK)- the authority managing public announcements and advertising- were changed. According to this contested regulation, any news outlet that employs a journalist who is being tried on terrorism related charges will not be given state advertising, unless the employee is fired from the media organization in five days.

== The case of Doğan Media Group ==
Arbitrary tax penalties are often imposed to force critical newspapers into bankruptcy, after which they reappear usually under the ownership of government-related groups or individuals.

Mainly due to commercial self-interests, Doğan Media Group's outlets have been taking a critical stance towards the ruling AKP. The government had a series of run-ins with it over the tax debts of Mr Doğan. The process continued with negotiations with the Ministry of Finance which resulted in the confiscation of Doğan TV holding stocks in 2009. The last development of this episode took place in April 2011, when the media group stated that it had agreed to sell its two major newspapers, Milliyet and Vatan, to the Demirören–Karacan joint venture for US$74 million. The Karacan family decided to set up a partnership with Demirören Group (DG), whose main interests are the distribution and retail sale of Liquefied petroleum gas (LPG), petroleum, as well as real-estate development, construction, mining, and metal products. According to the circulation figures, as to 2012 Milliyet and Vatan combined held a 6 percent share in the Turkish newspaper market, where over 30 newspapers sell a total of some 5 million print copies every day.

== Civil society initiatives ==
The Media Pluralism Monitor run by the European University Institute of Fiesole added Turkey among the monitored countries in 2016, working in partnership with the Galatasaray University. The project consists in a European-wide monitoring tool of risks for media pluralism: it is aimed at identifying threats to such pluralism based on a set of indicators, covering pertinent legal, economic and socio-cultural considerations.

Furthermore, in 2016, Reporters Without Borders, together with the Turkish independent press agency Bianet, launched the project Media Ownership Monitor Turkey to promote transparency in media ownership and to map who owns and controls the media in Turkey, by creating a public available and updated database listing the owners of the main media outlets (both individual owners and media companies) and detailing also the interests and the affiliations of owners into companies or political parties.

Another civil society initiative is the Network Data Compiling, a collective data compiling and mapping project dedicated to pursue the relations between capital and power in Turkey, released on July 14, 2014.

== See also ==
- Concentration of media ownership
- Turkish textbook controversies
- Human rights in Turkey
- Transparency of media ownership in Europe
- Censorship in Turkey
- Media of Turkey
- Access to public information in Turkey
- Media transparency
