= Transparency of media ownership in Turkey =

Transparency of media ownership is the public availability of accurate, comprehensive and up-to-date information about media ownership structures. A legal regime guaranteeing transparency of media ownership makes possible for the public as well as for media authorities to find out who effectively owns, controls and influences the media as well as media influence on political parties or state bodies. The disclosure of media ownership can be prescribed by generic regulation (commercial law) or by media-specific provision. Such measures may mandate the disclosure of information on media ownership structures to specific authorities or to the general public.

Turkey has both generic company laws and media-specific regulations on transparency of the print, broadcasting and online media outlets. Despite the existence of such laws, according to some experts the existing regulatory framework does not guarantee the disclosure of crucial information and to know who actually owns and influences the media in Turkey.

== Overview ==
With regard to the disclosure of media ownership information, Turkey has both generic company laws and specific regulations concerning the printed, broadcast and online sectors. These regulations provide both for the disclosure to public bodies such as the Chief Prosecutor's Office and the “Radio and Television Supreme Council” (RTUK), and for the disclosure to citizens through the publication of ownership information on the media companies’ websites.

However, a research by Access Info Europe shows that the existing laws misses to prescribe the disclosure of crucial information therefore failing to actually disclose who owns and influences the media in Turkey. In fact, neither print media (under the Press Law) nor broadcast (under the Law on the Establishment of Radio and Television Institutions and Their Broadcasts) or online media (under the Law on the Establishment of Radio and Television Institutions and Their Broadcasts and the Law on the Regulation of Online Broadcasts and the Struggle of Crimes Committed Online) are required to report the essential information needed to identify ownership. Also, as Access Info notes, the law applying to broadcasting and on demand services does not require to disclose if shares are held on behalf of another nor the existence of beneficial owners.

Uncertainty in the realm of transparency of media ownership in Turkey increased after 2001, when the ban on media conglomerates' bidding in public tenders was removed. In the last 15 years, the biggest Turkish media owners are corporations also operating in sectors such as construction, energy, mining and tourism. In this regard, strong ties with the government are lamented by Turkish civil society and the international community.

The situation of uncertain transparency of media ownership increased throughout 2015 and 2016, when government's trustees were appointed to allegedly Gulenist-affiliated media outlets and companies. A takeover took place on October 26, 2016 for the Koza-Ipek Media Group, which owned, among others, Bugun and Millet dailies and Cihan News Agency. Similarly, trustees were appointed on March 5, 2016, for Feza Holding, the media holding publishing, among others, the most read newspaper in Turkey, Zaman, and the English-language daily Today's Zaman. The assets of these companies are currently under the jurisdiction of the government's Savings Deposit Insurance Fund (TMSF), and it is not clear if the companies will be either dissolved or sold off.

Under emergency decree No. 687 of February 9, 2017, Turkey's Saving Deposit Insurance Fund (TMSF) will be authorized to sell companies seized by the state through the appointment of trustees.

== Legal framework ==
Disclosure of ownership information of broadcast media (radio and television) is required by Law No. 6112 on the Establishment of Radio and Television Institutions and Their Broadcasts (2011) and by the Regulation on the Administrative and Financial Terms to Be Obeyed By Media Service Provider Institutions and the Platform and Infrastructure Service Operators (2011). With regard to print media, disclosure is required by the Press Law No. 5187 (2004). Finally, with regard to online media, disclosure is required by Law No. 5651 on the Regulation of Online Broadcasts and the Struggle of Crimes Committed Online and the Regulation on the Procedures and Principles of Internet Broadcasts (2007).

Law No. 6112 on broadcasters requires “media service providers” to report ownership information. They are defined as legal entities which choose the content of the radio, television and on-demand broadcasting services. Instead, according to the Press Law, ownership information have to be disclosed for media organizations publishing “printed materials”. Finally, the legislation on online media includes within its scope content providers, hosting service providers and access providers (under Article No. 3 of Law No. 5651). They should publish their up to date information in the homepage of their website.

According to the relevant regulations for radios and televisions, ownership information have to be notified when a licence application is made, in cases of transfer of shares, acquisition and merger, changes to the disclosed information and annually, following the annual general meeting of shareholders. Instead, under the Press Law, information have to be disclosed before publishing a newspaper or other periodicals.

Except for online media, if the information has the nature of commercial secret, it can be withheld. For instance, this was the case when the Media Ownership Monitor – a project conducted by a team of members of Bianet, an independent Turkish press agency, and Reporters Without Borders – requested information regarding the Turkish public broadcaster's (TRT) finances.

Sanctions for non-disclosure are foreseen in the Press Law and in the Internet Law, covering only printed and online publications.

Also foreign media organizations are covered by the above listed requirements.

=== Information to be disclosed ===
According to the laws, the information that have to be disclosed by the information providers are:

- Name and contact details of media organisation;
- Name and contact details of owner;
- Country of domicile of company with an interest;
- Citizenship/residence status of individual with an interest;
- Except for the online media, the size of shareholding, namely the current shareholding structure, the voting shares, the capital-shares, the managers
- Management details: names of the members of board of directors, names and citizenship details of general managers and managers in charge and the duties of managers);
- Only for broadcasting media, if spouses, blood relatives and relatives in law up to the third degree are shareholders in the company, it will be indicated within the shareholdership structure considering these shares as owned by the same person;
- Only for print media, disclosure is required also for political, religious or other affiliations of shareholder, interests by owners in other media organisations and in non-media businesses.

Experts consider that existing obligations are not sufficient to establish who the legal or natural persons who effectively own and ultimately control the media organisations are.

=== Disclosure to public authorities ===
According to the Press Law, disclosure of ownership information has to be made to the Office of the local Chief Prosecutor.

According to Law No. 6112 on media service providers (broadcaster), their ownership information have to be reported to the “Radio and Television Supreme Council” (RTÜK) .

However, experts consider that regulators have no transparent, credible, and accessible annual records on media ownership.

=== Disclosure to the citizens ===
The information notified to the RTÜK have also to be published by the media organizations concerned on their websites. Under the Press Law, the records of the Public Prosecutor's office shall be public and anyone can see the relevant files containing published information and documents by making an application.

Information on media ownership can be obtained by the public by making a Freedom of Information request, under Law No. 4982, on the Right to Obtain Information which entitles individuals to request information and documents from public and publicly owned bodies. Usually, requests for information related to media ownership are raised by professionals and media institutions, while it is not common among ordinary citizens.

Media service providers (radio and TV broadcasters) can only be set up as joint stock companies. Only joint-stock companies have to disclose information to the trade registry, under the Turkish Commercial Code No. 6102. Media companies entering in the category of public joint-stock companies also have to respect the Capital Market Law No. 2499 (1981) and the Communiqué on Financial Reporting of the Capital Markets Board. These public enterprises should regularly draw financial statements to the Capital Markets Board, and annual reports should be disclosed to the public.

An example of public joint-stock company in the field of media is the state-run Turkish Radio and Television Corporation (TRT- Türkiye Radyo ve Televizyon Kurumu).

The results of a survey clearly showed that the sole enforcement of commercial law provides insufficient information regarding who effectively owns and ultimately controls media organizations.

== Beneficial ownership ==
None of the laws regulating print, broadcast and online media requires disclosure of beneficial owners, i.e. holders owning shares on behalf of another person, or those with indirect control or a significant interest to a media authority or to the public.

If the media company is established as a joint stock company, shareholding information can easily be accessed through the company's website and through the database of the trade registry. However, if shares are owned by one and actually used by another one as per an internal agreement, this information is not required to be disclosed by private or publicly listed companies meaning ultimate ownership cannot therefore be identified.

For this reason, experts consider that a reasonable, non-technical individual would not be able to ascertain who effectively owns and ultimately controls the media organisation, from the information available.

== Influence of advertising financing ==
As advertising is an important income for media providers and the allocation of advertisements may influence editorial policies or weaken certain media rather than others, media service providers (broadcasters) shall report their monthly commercial advertisement income to the RTÜK, by the 20th day of the following month.

The distribution of public funds on advertising is existentially an important source of income for smaller papers but the relative data remain hidden. For instance, the request of information on this topic by the Media Ownership Monitor was refused by the Turkish Right to Information Assessment Council, citing “trade secrets” as a reason.

Following the coup attempt, on October 5, 2016, regulations regarding the Press Advertisement Institution (Basın İlan Kurumu- BİK)- the authority managing public announcements and advertising- were changed. According to this contested regulation, any news outlet that employs a journalist who is being tried on terrorism related charges will not be given state advertising, unless the employee is fired from the media organization in five days.

== Civil society initiatives ==
Referring to the actions to be taken at a domestic level, some experts underlined the importance of encouraging public debate on media ownership, and to enhance media literacy on this topic.

In 2016, Reporters Without Borders, together with the Turkish independent press agency Bianet, launched the project Media Ownership Monitor Turkey to promote transparency in media ownership and to map who owns and controls the media in Turkey, by creating a public available and updated database listing the owners of the main media outlets (both individual owners and media companies) and detailing also the interests and the affiliations of owners into companies or political parties.

Another civil society initiative is the Network Data Compiling, a collective data compiling and mapping project dedicated to pursue the relations between capital and power in Turkey, released on July 14, 2014.

== See also ==
- Transparency of media ownership in Europe
- Concentration of media ownership in Turkey
- Censorship in Turkey
- Media of Turkey
- Access to public information in Turkey
- Concentration of media ownership
- Media transparency
