= Hande Fırat =

- Born: 10 September 1974 (age 51); Ankara, Turkey
- Education: Ankara University
- Occupations: Correspondent, broadcaster
- Years active: 1990s–present
- Spouse: Murat Özvardar (m. 2017)
- Children: 1 (b. 2005)

Hande Fırat (born 10 September 1974) is a Turkish correspondent.

== Early life ==
Hande Fırat was born on 10 September 1974 in Ankara. She completed her secondary education at Ankara Tevfik Fikret High School and her university education at Ankara University, Radio and Television Department.

== Career ==
Fırat began her career in television with internships during her university years. She then worked at Kanal D, NTV and BRT. In November 1999, she started to work as one of the main correspondents for CNN Türk. In 2011, she became CNN Türk's main representative, and in 2014 she acquired the same position for Kanal D in Ankara.

During the 2016 Turkish coup d'état attempt, Fırat talked on a live broadcast with Recep Tayyip Erdoğan through FaceTime on CNN Türk. This broadcast, which changed the course of the coup when Erdoğan called the people to go to the street, was seen as a success for Fırat. In the same year, she won the "Media Event of the Year" award at the 43rd Golden Butterfly Awards.

In October 2020, Fırat praised Emine Erdoğan for using "locally-produced" counterfeits rather than originals in her choices of handbags, noting that recyclability was a concern in Erdoğan's preferences.

== Personal life ==
Fırat knows English and French. In 2005, she gave birth to a daughter whom she named Nehir. On 5 December 2017, she married businessman Murat Özvardar.

== Awards ==
- 2016: Golden Butterfly Award – "Media Event of the Year"
- 2017: Radio and Television Journalists Association (RTGD) Award – "July 15 Martyrs and Democracy Award"

== Books ==
- 24 Saat. Istanbul: Doğan Kitap. 2016. ISBN 9786050937732.
