= Dream TV (Turkey) =

Turkish television channel

Programming
- Language(s): Turkish
- Picture format: 1080i (HDTV)

Ownership
- Owner: Demirören Group
- Sister channels: Kanal D, CNN Türk, Dream Türk

History
- Launched: 15 March 2003; 22 years ago 1 July 2023; 20 months ago (relaunch)
- Closed: 1 August 2020

Links
- Website: Dream TV Website

Dream TV is a Turkish television channel owned by Demirören Group, which broadcasts music clips.

== Shows ==
- Sabah Enerjisi (Refik Sarıöz)
- Genç İz (Hazal Kazancı & Emre Fakioglu)
- Dream Hits
- Ana Sahne (Main Stage / İpek Atcan)
- Evdeki Ses (House of Sound /Pelin Orhuner)
- Hayal Sahnesi (Dream Stage)
- Rock Me
- Advanced
- Popcorn
- Dream 10
- T-Rock
- T-Rap
- Dans@
- 4x4
- Lirix
- Dream Hafta Sonu (Dream Weekend / Ezgi Cantekin)

== Presenters ==
- Hazal Kazancı
- Emre Fakıığlu
- Pelin Orhuner
- Refik Sarıöz

== Events & Festivals ==
2013

- Monofest
- The Sound of Change

2011

- Massive Weekend
- Freshtival
- VFree Zone Festival
- Spice UP Festival
- Rock'n Coke
- Sonisphere Festival (Turkey)
- One Love Festival
- Van İçin Rock (ROCK FOR VAN)

== Logo history ==
Dream TV's January 2006 - 15 February 2010 between a former logo
