= Meltem Akçöl =

Turkish actress (born 2001)

- Born: 1 January 2001 (age 25); Istanbul, Turkey
- Education: Bahçeşehir University
- Occupation: Actress
- Years active: 2021–present
- Agent: Televi Menajerlik

Meltem Akçöl (born 1 January 2001) is a Turkish actress.

== Life and career ==
She was born on 1 January 2001, in Istanbul. She worked as a model from the age of 3 to 6. While in primary school, she took part in theatrical plays and school events. She made her acting debut with the television series Kırık Hayatlar, which aired from 2021 to 2022.

In 2022, she portrayed the character Hazal in the television series Duy Beni. In 2023, she played the character İpek in the television series Gülcemal.

In 2024, she portrayed the character Sultan in the television series Kara Ağaç Destanı.

In the summer of the same year, she portrayed the character Zeynep Akay in the film Karantina, an adaptation of the novel of the same name.

== Filmography ==
Television
Year	Production	Role	Notes	Channel
2021–2022	Kırık Hayatlar	Deniz Yılmaz	Lead role	Kanal D / tv2
2022	Duy Beni	Hazal Demir	Supporting role	Star TV
2023	Gülcemal	İpek Nakkaşoğlu	Supporting role	FOX
2024	Kara Ağaç Destanı	Sultan Karadere	Lead role	TRT 1
Upcoming	Sevdam Karadeniz	Zeyşan Yeniceli	Lead role	NOW
Internet
Year	Production	Role	Notes	Platform
Upcoming	Operasyon Alesta	Nehir	Lead role	tabii
Film
Year	Production	Role	Notes	Director
2025	Karantina	Zeynep Akay	Lead role	Ahmet Topuz
Upcoming	Babamın Damadı	Dicle Halefoğlu	Lead role	Yasemin Türkmenli
