= MTV (Turkey) =

- Country: Turkey
- Broadcast area: Turkey
- Headquarters: Istanbul

Programming
- Picture format: 16:9 (1080i, HDTV)

Ownership
- Owner: Paramount Global
- Sister channels: VH1 Europe; Nickelodeon (Turkey); MTV Hits; MTV Live HD; Nickelodeon HD

History
- Launched: 23 October 2006
- Replaced: MTV Europe
- Closed: 31 August 2011
- Replaced by: MTV Europe

MTV Türkiye was a Turkish pay-television channel owned by Paramount. It launched on 23 October 2006.

== History ==
=== Launch ===
MTV Türkiye's opening party was held on 17 November 2006 in Istanbul, with a Pussycat Dolls performance. It was officially launched on 23 October 2006, replacing MTV Europe in Turkey. The first broadcast of the channel was Nil Karaibrahimgil's music video Peri.

=== Digiturk and MTVNI ===
MTV Turkey was removed from Digiturk on 22 to 23 May 2010 with no reason given to the customers, which caused a small controversy amongst customers. On 20 June 2010, it was reported that MTV Networks International cancelled Multichannel Developers's (the company that operated MTV Turkiye) licence a month ago. On the same day, MTV Turkiye's website closed with a text saying that their new site will be available as soon as possible. As of October 2010, the channel operates on cable TV (e.g. on D-Smart Ch. 63, see Digital television in Turkey) and free-to-air satellite.

The channel ceased broadcasting on 31 August 2011.

MTV Europe was aired instead of MTV Türkiye, on 1 March 2012 on channel 107 of the Digiturk platform.

== Festivals/Special programming ==
- Sonisphere Festival (Istanbul, Turkey 2010)
- Freshtival, 2009
- Olympos Music Fest, 2008
- Electronica Festival, 2008
- Radar live, 2007

== See also ==
- Dream TV (Turkey)
- Viacom International Media Networks (Europe)
- VIVA (TV station)
- MuchMusic
- Music of Turkey
