= Apoyevmatini =

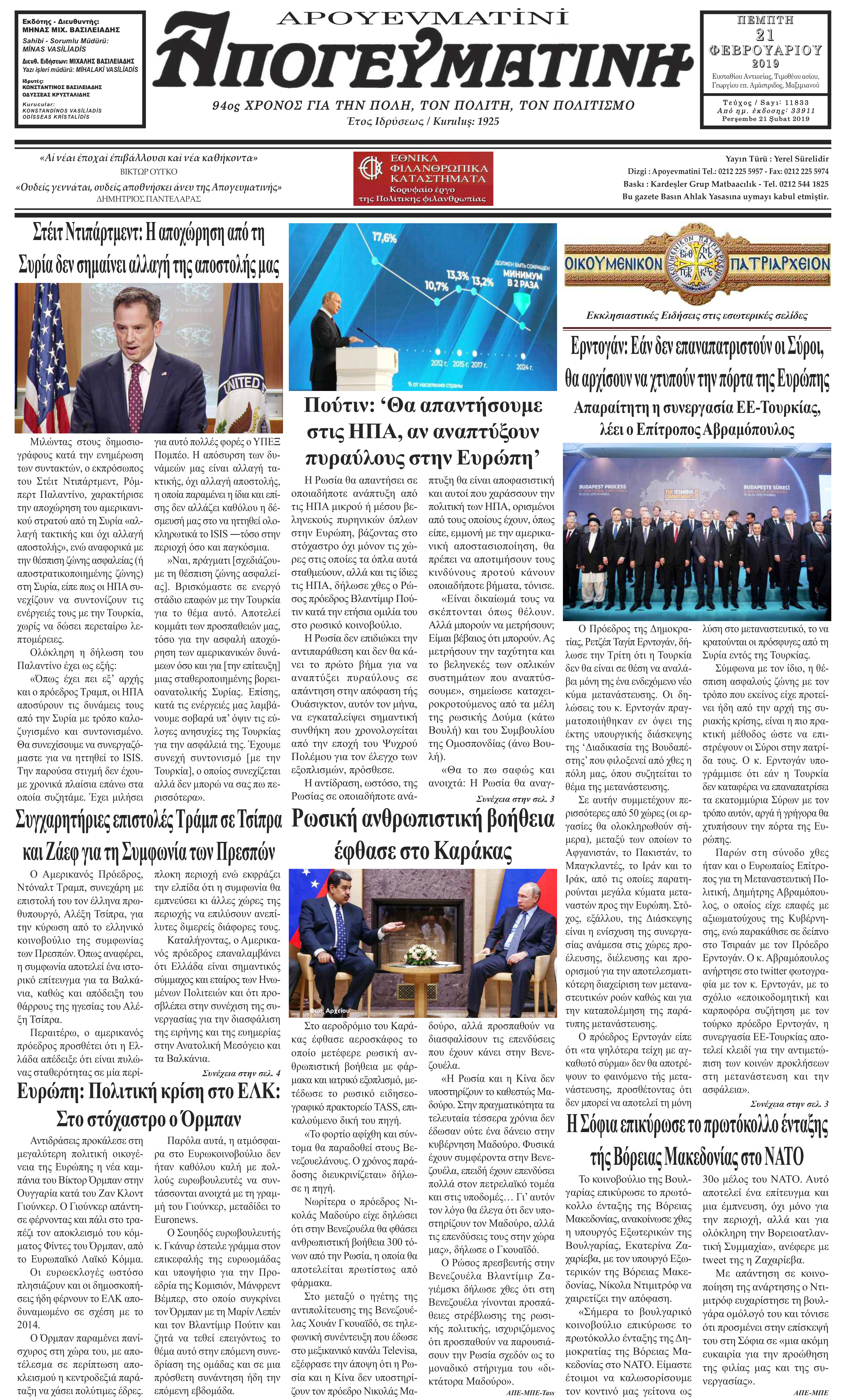
Apoyevmatini frontpage

Apoyevmatini (in Greek: Απογευματινή, meaning "Afternoon (newspaper)", alternative transliteration Apogevmatini) is a daily Greek-language newspaper published in Istanbul, Turkey. The newspaper was founded on 12 July 1925 and is still being published until today. Following the Turkish Cumhuriyet, Apoyevmatini is the second most senior daily newspaper founded after the Republic of Turkey came into existence, its readers being mostly Greeks in Turkey.

Apoyevmatini has a circulation of approximately 600 hard copies, meaning that it is reaching almost every Greek home in Istanbul. Since the newspaper is being distributed mostly manually by a handful of distributors, in order to cover interested off-city limits parties it is also available in electronic form, via subscription through the Internet.

== History ==
Apoyevmatini was initially founded as a collaboration between Konstantinos Vasileiadis (in Greek: Κωνσταντίνος Βασιλειάδης), holder of the publishing license, and Odysseas Krystalidis (Οδυσσέας Κρυσταλλίδης), owner and operator of printing facilities, and experienced individual in newspaper distribution. Editor-in-chief until 1927 was Kavalieros Markouizos (Καβαλιέρος Μαρκουΐζος), who adopted the motto still being used in the newspaper, Victor Hugo's "New epochs bring new missions" (in Greek: Αι νέαι εποχαί επιβάλλουσι και νέα καθήκοντα). Appropriate for the time, the motto reflected the transition that the Greek community was facing, following the emergence of the newly formed Republic of Turkey out of the Ottoman Empire.

In 1927 Grigorios Giaveridis (Γρηγόριος Γιαβερίδης) becomes editor-in-chief until his death, on 1 August 1979. After this date, his brother-in-law Dr. Georgios Adosoglou (Γεώργιος Αδόσογλου) along with his brother, Vasileios Adosoglou (Βασίλειος Αδόσογλου) followed up in the administrative duties. In their times another motto was introduced, and used along with the first one; "Ουδείς γεννάται, ουδείς αποθνήσκει άνευ της Απογευματινής" (Nobody gets born, nobody dies without Apoyevmatini). This was probably a discreet hint on the newspaper's potential demographic significance, since it is up to this date habitual for Greek families to announce births, baptisms, matrimony, deaths and memorial services to newspapers.

In September 1955 during the anti-Greek Istanbul Pogrom, the offices and the printing establishments of the newspaper were completely wrecked by the fanatical mob. Apoyevmatini managed to resume its publication two weeks after the event. Its losses alone were estimated at 500,000 Turkish liras.

After Dr. Georgios' Adosoglou death on 21 June 2002, ownership of Apoyevmatini was transferred to his sister, Efsevia Adosoglou (Ευσεβία Αδόσογλου), with the newspaper declining to a circulation of barely 80 copies per day, managing to survive only through minor incoming funds from donations and announcements. Since 1 January 2003, Michael Vasiliadis (Μιχαήλ Βασιλειάδης) has been the editor-in-chief of Apoyevmatini.

In July 2011, Apoyevmatini declared that it would shut down due to financial difficulties: the newspaper faced closure due to financial problems that had been further aggravated by the economic crisis in Greece, when Greek companies quickly stopped publishing advertisements. This ignited a campaign to help the newspaper. Among others, the supporters were mostly students from İstanbul Bilgi University who subscribed to the newspaper and ran a campaign including video spots calling for help, with the slogan 'Apoyevmatini is our Cultural Heritage too' (in Turkish: "Bu gazete bizim de kültür mirasımızdır". The campaign saved the paper from bankruptcy for the time being. Because the Greek community is close to extinction, money from occasional obituary notices and from the announcements of the various Greek-orthodox foundations of Istanbul, as well as subscriptions by Greek and Turkish people, are the only sources of income. As of 2011 this income covered only 40 percent of the newspaper expenditures.

This was followed in September 2011 by a government cash grant of 45,000 Turkish liras to the newspaper through the Turkish Press Advertisement Institution (Basın İlan Kurumu), as part of a wider support of minority newspapers.

The Turkish Press Advertisement Agency also declared intention to publish official government advertisements in religious-minority newspapers including 'Apoyevmatini'.

In October 2014 Apoyevmatini had to leave its historical office which has housed it since 1925, in Suriye Pasajı. Five years later, in 2019, the editors described the newspaper's future as "uncertain".

== Content ==
Besides news generally expected to be found in daily newspapers, Apoyevmatini contains news and matters of interest for the Greek minority in Turkey, including official announcements of the Ecumenical Patriarchate, birth, baptism, matrimony, death and memorial service announcements of the Greek community, and news and analyses on Greek-Turkish relations. One can also find news of international interest such as education, culture, charity, technology, health and science.

== Printing methods ==
During earlier years the newspaper was being produced using type-founding and printing press in the newspaper's own installations, but with the declining of the Greek population the circulation of the newspaper also declined, leaving no option but to sell the space used for printing. The original equipment is currently being exhibited in the Museum of Printing Press in Sultanahmet.

Until December 2007 the technology behind the process of preparing each issue was unsatisfactory. Due to lack of funds, each page was prepared by hand; the infrastructure installed in the newspaper's office consisted of a 486 microprocessor-based PC, an inkjet printer and one photocopy machine. Text was written and printed, and then cut in a rectangle shape of physical width matching that of the newspaper's column. All the rectangles assembling the final columns would then be glued to a thin sheet A2 sized paper which would be photocopied and become the master copy for that page. The process would be repeated for each of the four daily pages of the newspaper, which would then be outsourced to a modern printing facility to be photographed and printed using a photo-offset printing method. Because of the use of photocopy paper (as opposed to using a film), the resulting contrast was too poor to allow any detail to be seen in photographs, thus banning them from the final print. After December 2007 and because of the widespread access to technology the newspaper's budget allowed the renewal of the equipment, and it is now being issued using modern digital methods.
