= Evrensel =

Turkish daily newspaper

- Type: Daily newspaper
- Owner: Kürşat Yılmaz
- Founded: 7 June 1995; 31 years ago
- Political alignment: Socialism; Leftism; Secularism
- Language: Turkish
- Headquarters: Şirinevler, Istanbul, Turkey
- Website: evrensel.net

Evrensel (English: Universal) is a Turkish daily newspaper.

== History and profile ==
Evrensel was founded on 7 June 1995. The issues captured and written are from a socialist perspective. The paper is different from other Turkish newspapers in that it presents an in-depth research into issues surrounding the workers unions. In 2017, newspaper started an English version of news.

=== Ban on public advertisements ===
In 2019, Turkey's Press Advertisement Agency (BİK) imposed a suspension on Evrensel newspaper, blocking its access to government advertisements.

In August 2022, Turkish authorities permanently revoked the Evrensel daily's license to publish public advertisements, a vital revenue source for many newspapers. The cancellation, imposed by Turkey’s Press Advertising Agency (BİK), was based on allegations of "bulk buying" of newspapers in several provinces. Specifically, it was reported that 13 provincial and district organizations of the Labor Party (EMEP) collectively purchased 650 copies of Evrensel, and that a small number of individuals were purchasing multiple copies from dealers in İstanbul, Ankara, İzmir, and Kocaeli provinces.

This decision followed a previous ban on public ads that had been in place since September 2019, also based on similar accusations. Fatih Polat, the editor-in-chief of Evrensel, criticized the move, calling it a “political operation aimed at silencing” the newspaper. The Broadcasting and Printer Workers Union (DİSK BASIN-İŞ) also condemned the ban, describing BİK as a tool for economic control by the government.

Earlier, in August 2022, Turkey's Constitutional Court ruled that advertising bans imposed on BirGün, Sözcü, Cumhuriyet, and Evrensel, all critical of the ruling AKP, violated their rights to free speech and press freedom. The court ordered a reevaluation of the decisions and awarded the newspapers damages.

International press freedom organizations have called for Turkey to restore Evrensel's right to receive public advertisements.

== Incidents ==
Metin Göktepe, the 27-year-old journalist whose death in police custody in 1996 caused public protests and outcry, was on duty as a reporter for Evrensel on the day of his detention and murder.
