= Demirören News Agency =

Turkish news agency

- Formerly: Doğan News Agency
- Company type: Subsidiary
- Industry: News agency
- Founded: 1999; 27 years ago
- Headquarters: Istanbul, Turkey
- Parent: Demirören Group
- Website: dha.com.tr

Demirören News Agency (DHA; Turkish: Demirören Haber Ajansı) is a Turkish news agency which was founded in 1999. It is owned by the Demirören Group. It provides news in English, German and Chinese as well as Turkish. In 2011 it had 41 offices in Turkey and 26 abroad.

Formerly owned by the Doğan Media Group and called Doğan Haber Ajansı, DHA was known for its critical coverage of the Turkish president Recep Tayyip Erdoğan. In March 2018, the parent company was sold to Demirören Group whose owner, Erdoğan Demirören, is close to the Recep Tayyip Erdoğan government.

== See also ==
- Death of Alan Kurdi
