= Suriye Pasajı =

Shopping arcade in Istanbul, Turkey

- Interactive map of the Suriye Pasajı area
- Alternative names: Syria Arcade; Cité de Syrie

General information
- Type: Shopping arcade
- Architectural style: Neoclassical
- Location: Asmalımescit, Beyoğlu, İstiklal Avenue 166 (formerly 348), Istanbul, Turkey
- Current tenants: Ada Kitabevi; Santral Sineması (Cine Central); Apoyevmatini (former); Nor Marmara (former); Stamboul (former)
- Year built: 1901–1908
- Construction started: 1901
- Completed: 1908

Technical details
- Floor count: 6

Design and construction
- Architect: Demetre Th. Bassiladis
- Designations: Historical

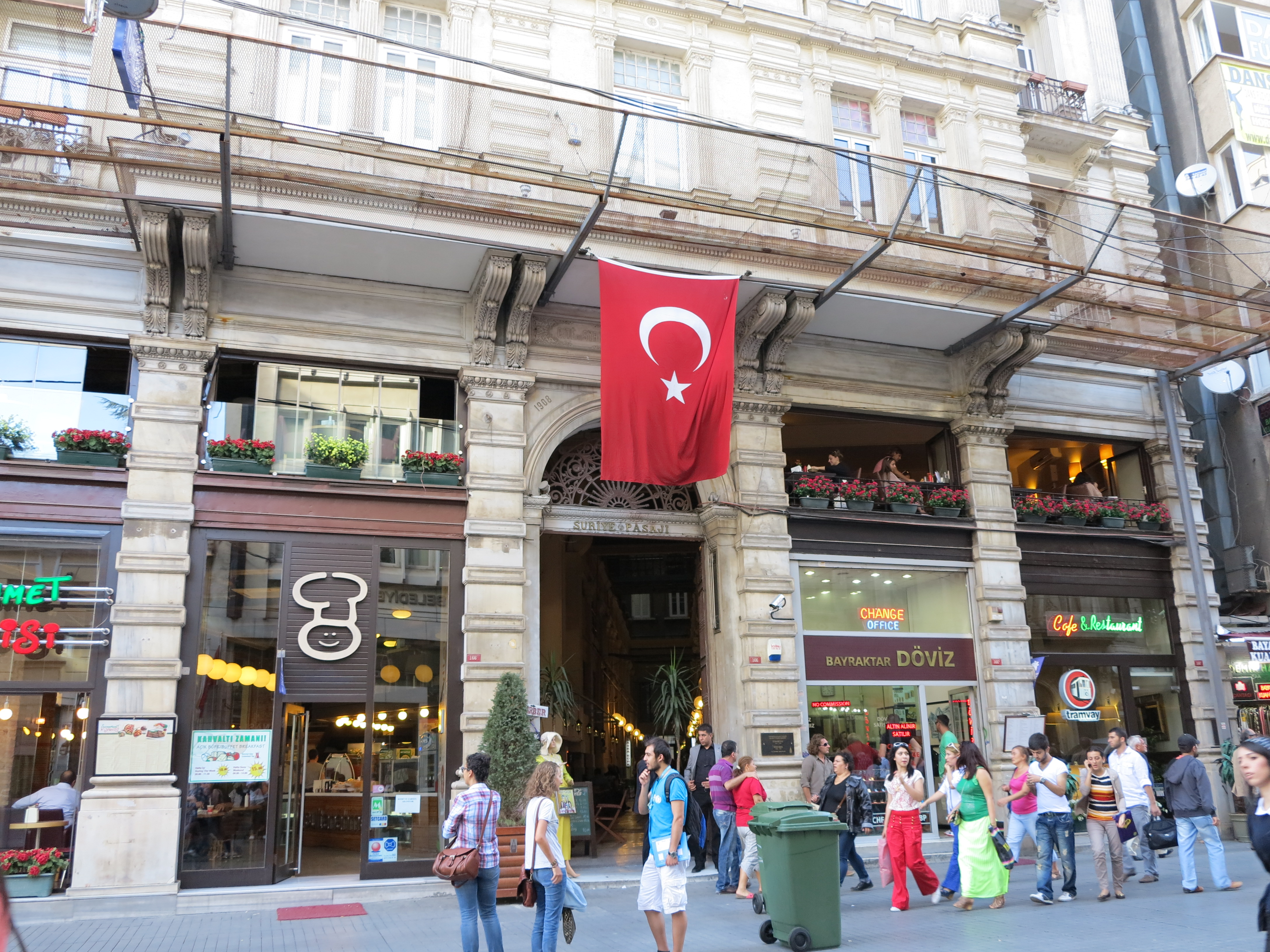
The building's exterior, 2012

Suriye Pasajı (lit. 'Syria Arcade'; French: Cité de Syrie) is a historical six-storey shopping arcade located in Istanbul, Turkey, in the Asmalımescit subdistrict of Beyoğlu. The arcade is situated on İstiklal Avenue 166 (formerly 348). The ground floor of the arcade hosts a wide array of businesses, meanwhile upper floors are being mostly used for residential accommodation. It was built in 1908.

== History ==
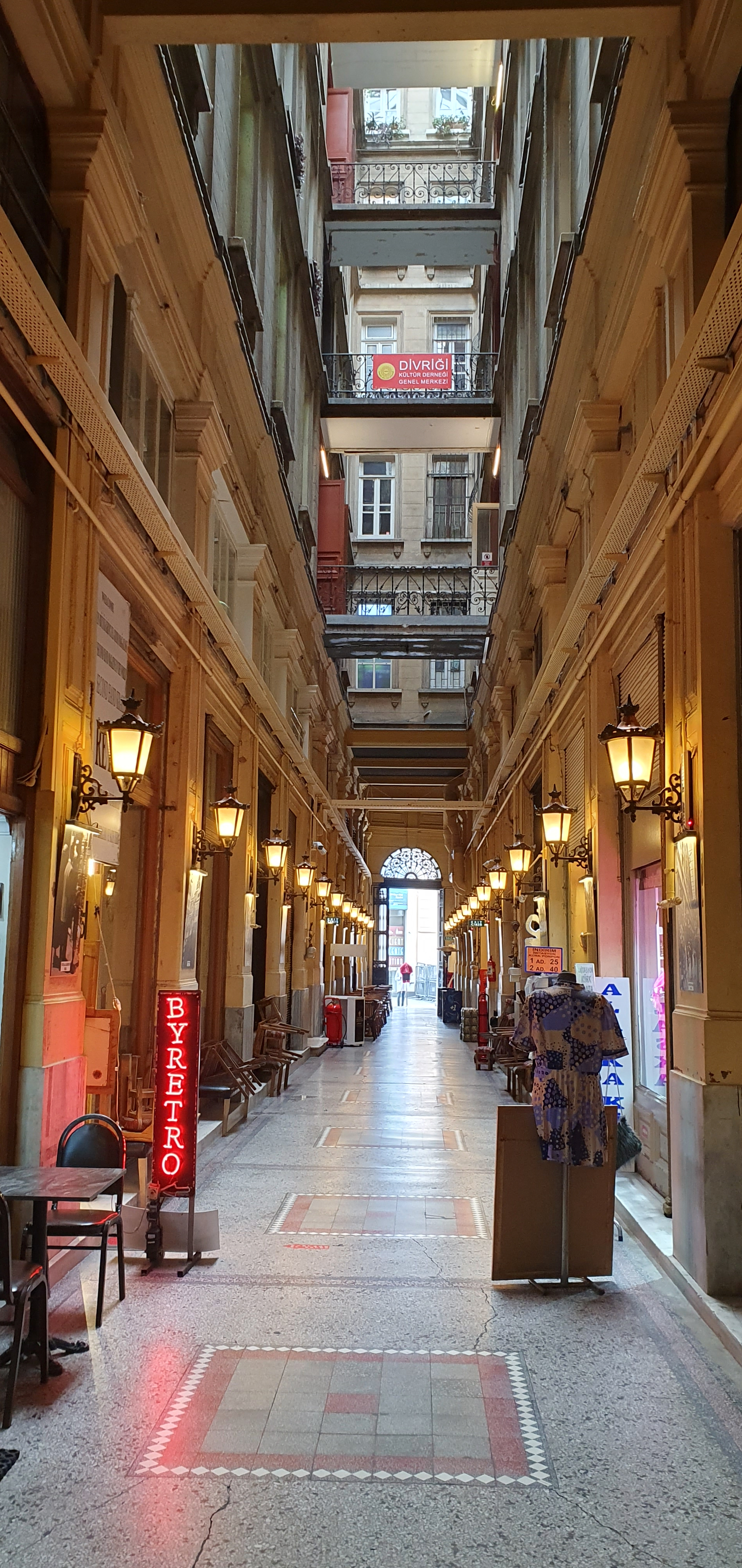
The arcade in 2023

Construction of the building started in 1901 and financed by Syrian Hasan Halbuni Pasha and the president of the Istanbul Chamber of Commerce, Mehmet Abbud Pasha. The project was designed by Greek architect Demetre Th. Bassiladis in neoclassical style and arcade was completed in 1908. In 1911, the Santral Sineması (Cine Central) was opened inside the building.

For more than 100 years, Suriye Pasajı has hosted and continues to host individuals, families, offices and businesses belonging to many different cultures. Headquarters of Stamboul, a French language newspaper that was printed between 1875 and 1964, was situated in this arcade. The head offices of minority newspapers such as Apoyevmatini written in Greek and Armenian Nor Marmara were also located in this building until the early 2010s.

There is an antique and second-hand shop in the basement of the building. Leather and fur shops, coffee and tea houses, a night club and restaurants are other examples of modern businesses in the building. Ada Kitabevi is a bookshop that also hosts a cafe inside. Art exhibitions are also being held in arcade's atelier. There are concerns about cafes and restaurants of the arcade that illegally occupy corridors of the building.
