= TV2 (Turkish TV channel) =

Turkish television channel

- Country: Turkey
- Broadcast area: List: Turkey; Azerbaijan; Northern Cyprus
- Affiliates: Kanal D

Programming
- Language: Turkish
- Picture format: 1080i HDTV

Ownership
- Owner: Demirören Group

History
- Launched: 15 February 2008; 18 years ago
- Former names: TNT (2008–12) teve2 (2016–2025)

Links
- Website: tv2 official site

TV2 (stylised in all lowercase) is a Turkish entertainment channel owned by the Demirören Group. The channel launched on 18 August 2012, with the tv2 name to replace TNT, which had decided to withdraw from the Turkish market due to difficulty. In 10 October 2016, the channel changed its name to teve2. Like most Turkish channels, both local and foreign programs are shown on the channel, and the foreign programs may be broadcast either dubbed or in their original language. The channel is mostly known for its broadcast of the game show Kelime Oyunu (Word Game in English). On 31 December 2025, the channel reverted its name to TV2.

== tv2 HD ==
tv2 HD is the high-definition version of the tv2 channel was launched in February 2013. Until 2014 the channel was only accessible through the D-Smart platform, but with the launch of the Turksat 4A satellite, it was added to Vodafone TV and the Turksat 4A satellite.
