= Fanatik (Turkey) =

Turkish sports newspaper

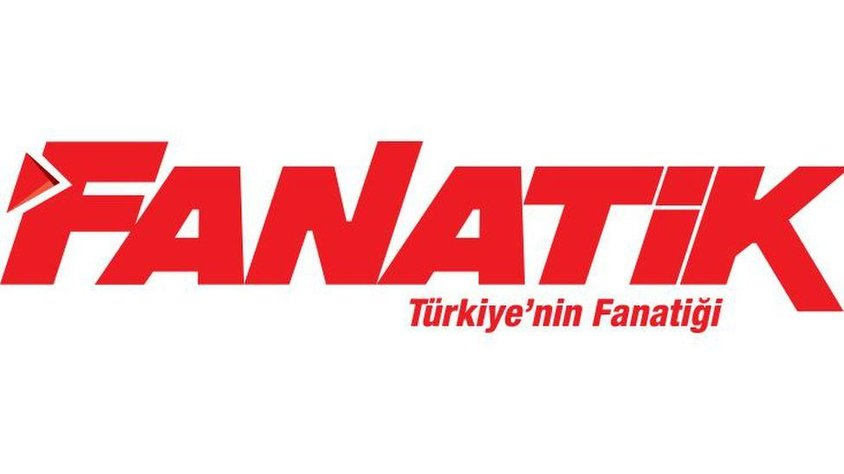
- Owner: Demirören Gazetecilik A.Ş.
- Editor-in-chief: Umut Eken
- General manager: Yalçın Uygun
- Founded: 20 November 1995; 30 years ago
- Political alignment: Non-political
- Language: Turkish
- City: Bağcılar, Istanbul
- Country: Turkey
- Circulation: 270,517 (1996); 82,730 (2018)
- Website: fanatik.com.tr

Fanatik is a Turkish daily-published and online sports newspaper.

== History ==
Fanatik was founded on 20 November 1995. Fanatik is owned by Demirören Group since April 2018, following a group of companies acquisition of previous owners Doğan Holding. Since 1995, the paper has also been distributed in Germany and Austria, but the distribution was canceled in Germany in 2010. In Germany, the circulation dropped under 8,000 copies per edition. Fanatik also offers web TV. In 1996, Fanatik held a daily average circulation of 270,517 copies.

Since 2000, Fanatik is a member of the European Sports Magazines.
