= Anka News Agency =

Turkish news agency

- Founded: 1972
- Language: Turkish
- Headquarters: Ankara, Turkey
- Website: https://ankahaber.net/

Anka News Agency (Turkish: Anka Haber Ajansı, abbreviated ANKA) is a news agency based in Ankara, Turkey, established in 1972. "Anka" means "phoenix" in Turkish.

== History ==
ANKA was established in 1972 by Altan Öymen. Öymen left ANKA in 1977 to pursue a political career, with Müşerref Hekimoğlu taking over and turning ANKA into a joint stock company. Hekimoğlu led ANKA until 2004.

In 2007 ANKA's offices were broken into and its computer hard drives stolen, after it reported on the ties of Erhan Tuncel (an associate of the assassin of Hrant Dink) to nationalist circles and that Tuncel had been working as a police informer and staff member of the Gendarmerie's intelligence service, JITEM.
