= Vatan (2002 newspaper) =

Turkish newspaper

- Type: Daily newspaper
- Format: Broadsheet
- Owner: Demirören Holding
- Founded: 2002
- Ceased publication: 2018
- Political alignment: Erdoğanism
- Language: Turkish
- City: Istanbul
- Country: Turkey
- Circulation: 127,586
- Website: www.gazetevatan.com

Vatan ("Homeland" or "Motherland") is a Turkish daily newspaper founded in 2002 by the Doğan Media Group. The paper was purchased by DK (Demirören-Karacan partnership) in April 2011 and totally acquired by Demirören Holding a few months later.

As of March 2011, Vatan had the 15th highest circulation in Turkey at 111,489. However on 1 November 2018 it ceased publication.
