= Gazete Duvar =

Turkish online news outlet

Duvar
- Gazete Duvar
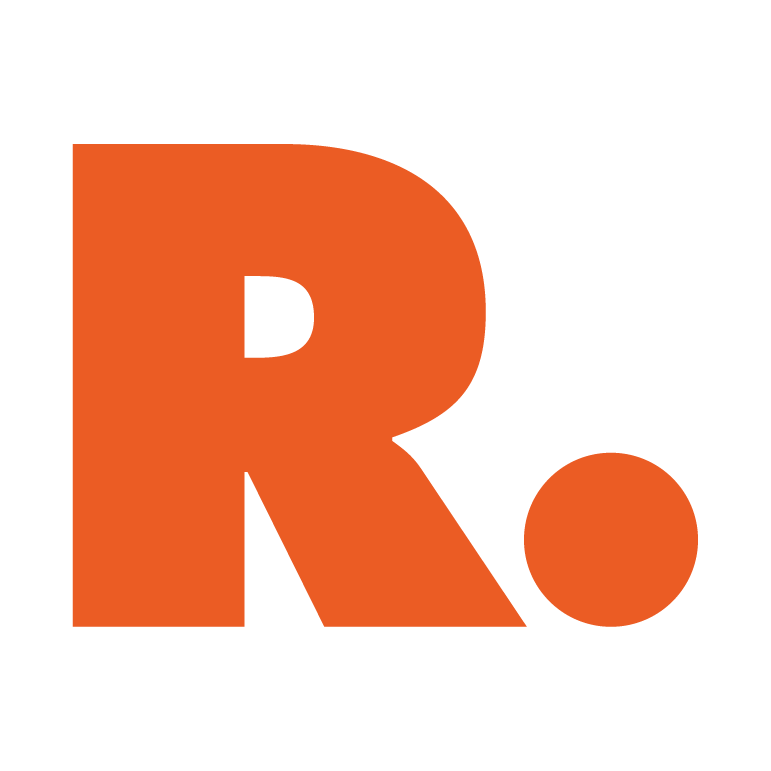
- Abbreviation: Duvar
- Formation: 8 August 2016
- Dissolved: 12 March 2025
- Headquarters: Istanbul
- Editor-in-chief: Ali Duran Topuz
- Website: gazeteduvar.com.tr duvarenglish.com

Duvar was an online news portal which focuses mainly on Turkish politics. Duvar's headquarters are located in Sariyer Istanbul.

== History ==
It was founded in 2016 by Vedat Zencir, the first conscientious objector in Turkey. Its current editor-in-chief is Ali Duran Topuz and it is described as reporting critically on the Turkish government. Several Academics for Peace who were dismissed from their work figure among its authors. Other journalists recruited were formerly employed by other Turkish media but dismissed due to their articles which criticized the Turkish government. Gazete Duvar was ordered several times to remove articles from the internet. In the past, Turkish judges have issued rulings which blocked access to certain articles it has published.

In October 2019, Duvar launched a version in English, and its editor-in-chief is Cansu Çamlıbel, a former Washington D.C. correspondent for the Hürriyet newspaper. Its goal was to inform English speaking readers about events in Turkey from an independent point of view. However, its early days were challenging due to financial struggles, with advertising covering only 20% of expenses. Additionally, given the limitations on press freedom in Turkey, Çamlıbel was uncertain whether the outlet could continue its reporting. According to the Center for American Progress, Duvar was more popular than Bianet as of 2020.

In 2024, Turkish independent media outlets critical of the government were impacted by a new Google algorithm, which was perceived as a form of covert censorship.

On 12 March 2025 it was announced that Duvar will cease publications after it could not afford costs when Google placed Duvar on lower search results. Duvar was not the only Turkish media who was hit by the changing algorithm of Google, other media as Halk TV lost up to 90% traffic and advertising revenue and starting legal action against Google.
