= Access to public information in Turkey =

Although under Turkish law and the constitution the public has a right of access to information held by public bodies, in practice there are difficulties obtaining information.

== Legal Framework ==
Access to public information and freedom of information (FOI) refer to the right of access to information held by public bodies also known as "right to know". Access to public information is considered of fundamental importance for the effective functioning of democratic systems, as it enhances governments' and public officials' accountability, boosting people participation and allowing their informed participation into public life. The fundamental premise of the right of access to public information is that the information held by governmental institutions is in principle public and may be concealed only on the basis of legitimate reasons which should be detailed in the law.

No specific right of access to information was enshrined in the 1982 Turkish Constitution that in Article 26 instead refers to the right of free expression, including the "right to receive information". In the 2001 amended Constitution, Article 74 specifically refers to the right to information establishing that everyone has the right to obtain information. Following the 2010 Constitutional amendments, the right to appeal to the Ombudsperson is also provided. Access to public information is regulated by the Law on the Right to Information, Law No: 4982 of 2004. The law was introduced in the framework of the negotiations for accession to the European Union. Turkey is not a party to the Aarhus Convention.

In addition to Law No: 4982, in 2004 a circular by the Prime Minister on “The exercise of the right of petition and access to information” was also enacted (Circular No. 25356). It identifies the basis of this policy in the principle called “citizen oriented approach in public services”.

According to Law No: 4982, the law applies to any natural and legal person who are entitled to apply to the institutions by way of exercising the right to information. Foreign residents can exercise the right “on the condition that the information that they require is related to them or the field of their activities and on the basis of the principle of reciprocity”.

The law applies to “any written, printed or copied file, document, book, journal, brochure, etude, letter, software, instruction, sketch, plan, film, photograph, tape and video cassette, map of the institutions and the information, news and other data that are recorded and saved in electronic format that are within the scope of (the) law”.

Government bodies are required to respond in 15 working days. They must provide either a certified copy of the document or when it is not possible to make a copy, applicants can examine them at the institution.

Initially, the Right to Information Assessment (Review) Council (Bilgi Edinme Değerlendirme Kurulu- BEDK) provided very poor information about its activities and decisions. It started to publish all information on its decision only in 2008 with the launch of its website. The BEDK jurisdiction on appeals for denials to requests of information was originally limited to cases relating to national security and state economic interests. In November 2005, the Law was amended in order to allow any kind of appeal. According to the 2016 EC progress report, the Board of Review of Access to Information was effective in its role of reviewing applicants' appeals and in publishing related decisions online. The report also notes that, however, there is no quality assurance in the responses given to applicants.

According to Decision No. 2016/1 of August 4, 2016 on “Applications for Information on Measures and Transactions within the Context of Emergency State Decentralization Laws”, the applicants who ask for information and documents relating with (i) persons who are removed from the public service and (ii) institutions and organizations which are closed down under the Decree Laws in the State of Emergency Law, are excluded from the scope of the right to obtain information.

According to the 2016 European Commission (EC) Progress Report on Turkey, the Law on access to public information is not fully aligned with international standards. Another problem highlighted by the EC is the failure to adopt pending legislation on state and trade secrets, which prevents to balance between confidentiality and transparency when assessing freedom of information requests.

=== Exceptions ===
Under Articles No. 20- 28 of Law No. 4982, the right to information can be restricted if such information refers to:

- Information and Documents Pertaining the State Secrets, which would clearly cause harm to the security of the state or foreign affairs or national defense and national security;
- Information and Documents Pertaining the Economical Interests of the State, which would harm the economic interests of the state or cause unfair competition or enrichment;
- Information and Documents Pertaining the State Intelligence, regarding the duties and activities of the civil and military intelligence units;
- Information and Documents Pertaining the Administrative Investigation, violating the right of privacy, endangering the security or the life of an individual, jeopardising the security of the investigation, disclosing the source of the information which needs to be kept secret,;
- Information or Documents Pertaining the Judicial Investigation and Prosecution;
- Privacy of the Individuals, which would interfere with the health records, private and family life, honour and dignity, and the economical and professional interests of an individual;
- Privacy of Communication;
- Trade Secrets and Intellectual Property;
- Institutions’ Internal Regulations, Opinions, Information Notes and Recommendations.

In practice, protection of state secrets, commercial secrets and privacy were among the most common grounds for rejecting a request. According to an expert, all these conditions largely nullify the legal provisions which are intended to protect the right to public information in Turkey.

== Access to public information in practice ==
The exercise of the right of access to public information is particularly problematic in the Turkish context, where the management of public affairs is characterized by a secretive approach to power and politics, and several problems affect the exercise of the right of free expression and media freedom. This worsened during the state of emergency following the 2016 attempted coup d'état, entailing severe limitations to media freedom and to dissemination of information, press freedom limitations, sanctions against newspapers and journalists, censorship and self-censorship.

A right to information request can be made using the tr:CİMER website.

In 2014, only 2,7% of requests for access to information were rejected, against 3,4% in 2013. The share of appeals refused by the Board of Review of the Access to Information fell from 50,6% in 2013 to 36,3% in 2014. According to the European Commission, more than 2 million applications a year for access to information were submitted both in 2015 and 2016. The percentage of requests refused remained small, approximately 3.7% up to June 2016 compared with 3% in 2015.

Regarding the right to access information for lawyers, especially when they are assisting defendants accused with terrorism charges, they face serious problems. Their access to documents pertaining to the case can be restricted before the trial.

In 2016 the Steering Committee of the Open Government Partnership (OGP) designated the inactive status of Turkey, for acting contrary to OGP process for two consecutive action plan cycles. The OGP action plan included, among other objectives, an improvement of the possibility to access public information for Turkish citizens. The decision followed a resolution approved unanimously by the OGP Steering Committee which called for the government of Turkey to take steps to re-engage in OGP, including the development of a National Action with broad civil society participation.

On September 21, 2016, the Open Government Partnership (OGP) Steering Committee designated the inactive status of Turkey with regard to the OGP action plan which included, among other objectives, an improvement of the possibility to access public information for Turkish citizens. The Steering Committee found that the Turkish government acted contrary to OGP process for two consecutive action plan cycles.

== See also ==
- Access to public information in Europe
- Censorship in Turkey
- Freedom of information laws by country
- Human rights in Turkey
- List of libraries in Turkey
- Media of Turkey
- Media freedom in Turkey
- Turkish textbook controversies
- Transparency of media ownership in Europe
