= Posta (newspaper) =

Turkish tabloid newspaper

- Type: Daily newspaper
- Format: Broadsheet
- Owner: Demirören Group
- Founded: 23 January 1995
- Political alignment: Conservative democracy Erdoğanism; Center-right
- Language: Turkish
- City: Bağcılar, Istanbul
- Country: Turkey
- Circulation: 212,097 (as of 9 September 2018)
- Website: www.posta.com.tr

Posta is a Turkish tabloid newspaper, with the second-highest circulation in Turkey. It was founded in 1995 by Doğan Media Group and began publication on 23 January 1995. Posta had a daily circulation of approximately 516,000 in 2009. The newspaper is published in Istanbul by Doğan Holding, which also used to own (1994–2018) other major Turkish newspapers, including Hürriyet.

On 21 March 2018, Demirören Group acquired the newspaper.

== Editorial line ==
The paper's editorial line has been described as tabloid, similar to the New York Daily News or the Daily Mirror, appealing to broad audiences with more attention paid to entertainment and gossip than politics and economics.

== Scandals & Coverage ==
=== The United States 2016 election scandal ===
On November 9, as the 2016 United States presidential election was to be concluded, without waiting for the full disclosure of the votes, Posta published an article called "Clinton President!", assuming that she had won, which the newspaper had written beforehand according to the polls. The paper was criticised for acting too quickly and not waiting for the election to conclude.
