= Bianet =

News agency based in Turkey

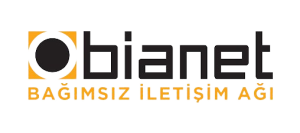
- Founded: 2000
- Type: news agency
- Legal status: Active
- Official language: Turkish, English, Kurdish
- Website: www.bianet.org

Bianet (acronym for Turkish: Bağımsız İletişim Ağı, lit. 'Independent Communication Network') is an Independent news agency based in Beyoğlu, Istanbul. Focused on human rights in Turkey it is mainly funded by a Swedish organization. Bianet was established in January 2000 by journalists around Nadire Mater, former representative of Reporters Without Borders, and left-wing activist Ertuğrul Kürkçü and is tied with Inter Press Service. It is mostly funded by the European Commission through the European Instrument for Democracy and Human Rights (EIDHR). Erol Önderoğlu served as the monitoring editor for Bianet for several years. His work for Bianet included quarterly reports on free speech in Turkey. A 2022 study said that it partly followed the principles of citizen journalism. It is active on social media.

In collaboration with EIDHR and KAOS GL, an association that focuses on LGBT rights in Turkey, Bianet organized workshops between 2016 and 2018 in various cities concerning gender specific language in the mass media in Turkey.

== Controversies ==
Access to the Bianet website was briefly blocked in Turkey on 16 July 2019, after it was included on a list of 136 websites and social media accounts that were deemed a threat to national security. The block was lifted the following day, after protests, and the authorities said that Bianet had been blocked by mistake.

== See also ==
Gazete Duvar
