= CNN Türk =

Turkish news channel

- Country: Turkey
- Broadcast area: Turkey
- Network: CNN
- Affiliates: CNN Türk Radyo
- Headquarters: Istanbul

Programming
- Language: Turkish
- Picture format: 1080i HDTV

Ownership
- Owner: Demirören Group (licensed from Skydance)
- Sister channels: List: Warner Bros. Discovery EMEA CNN International Cartoon Network Cartoonito DMAX Eurosport 1 Eurosport 2 TLC Demirören Group Kanal D D Çocuk D Spor D Hipodrom Euro D D Max T.A.Y. TV TV2

History
- Launched: 11 October 1999
- Replaced: Eko TV

Links
- Website: cnnturk.com

Availability

Streaming media
- Watch live: http://video.cnnturk.com/canli-yayin

Cable News Network Türk (known as CNN Türk) is a Turkish free-to-air television news channel, launched on 11 October 1999 as the local affiliate of American network CNN by the Doğan Media Group. It broadcasts exclusively in Turkey and is currently owned by Demirören Group under a licensing agreement with Skydance.

== CNN International and Demirören Group ==
CNN Türk was originally operated by Doğan Media Group; however, in 2018, the group sold the network to the pro-government Demirören Group. Following the sale, parent network CNN International held discussions with Demirören regarding CNN Türk's political stance, the continued use of the CNN name, and the potential effects of the sale. CNN assured that the Turkish network would continue to uphold "CNN standards."

=== 2019 Elections scandal ===
CNN International came under fire again following accusations that the Turkish network had treated the main opposition candidate unfairly during the 2019 Turkish local elections. The election coverage, presented by Ahmet Hakan, was criticized for allegedly having a more hostile and confrontational tone when the presenter was talking with opposition figures, the network was also accused of cutting to commercial breaks during segments in which the government faced criticism. In response to the controversy, CNN stated that although CNN Türk operated as an independent Turkish broadcaster, it was still expected to adhere to CNN's editorial standards and journalistic independence.

=== CNN Investigation ===
On 8 December 2021, CNN International allegedly launched an investigation into perceived "bias at CNN Türk" after growing public criticism of the parent network on CNN Türk's editorial stance, sending a committee to examine its political coverage and assess whether the broadcaster was adhering to CNN's editorial standards.

== Controversies ==
CNN Türk was one of the Turkish news channels which was criticised for not covering the Gezi Park protests. On June 2, 2013, at 1:00am, CNN Türk was broadcasting a documentary on penguins while CNN International was showing live coverage of the protests in Turkey.

It was a classic case of the revolution not being televised. The whole country seemed to be experiencing a cognitive disconnect, with Twitter saying one thing, the government saying another, and the television off on another planet.

— The New Yorker on CNN Türk failing to report on the Gezi Park protests

In 2014, it showed a documentary on bees as Turkish Kurds undertook major protests about Ankara's refusal to support Kurdish fighters battling Islamic State in Kobanê.

On 15 July 2016, CNN Turk was forced to shut down by soldiers during the 2016 Turkish coup attempt.

In February 2020, the Republican People's Party (CHP) announced a boycott of CNN Türk. Tuncay Özkan from the CHP alleged that the TV channel acts like a publicity agency for the government of the Justice and Development Party (AKP). No politicians from the CHP would take part in any debate on CNN Türk and the CHP also advised not to watch CNN Türk at all.

== CNN Türk Radio ==
CNN Türk Radio, went on the air on November 22, 2001. Last-minute developments, in-depth analyses, economic agenda, evaluations by experts, important names of the business world and economic staff, sports news from Turkey and the world can be listened to at any time, and programs of special interest can also be followed via radio.

CNN TÜRK Radio is the audio broadcasting company of CNN TÜRK, which was established as a joint venture between Demirören Holding and Time Warner. As of September 21, 2020, the radio frequency in Istanbul has been changed to 92.6.

== Notable anchors ==
- Ahmet Hakan Coşkun
- muhammed agayarlou - cnntürk iran temsilcisi
