= Radio and Television Supreme Council =

Turkish broadcasting regulator

Agency overview
- Formed: 16 May 1994
- Headquarters: Ankara
- Agency executive: Ebubekir Şahin
- Website: rtuk.gov.tr

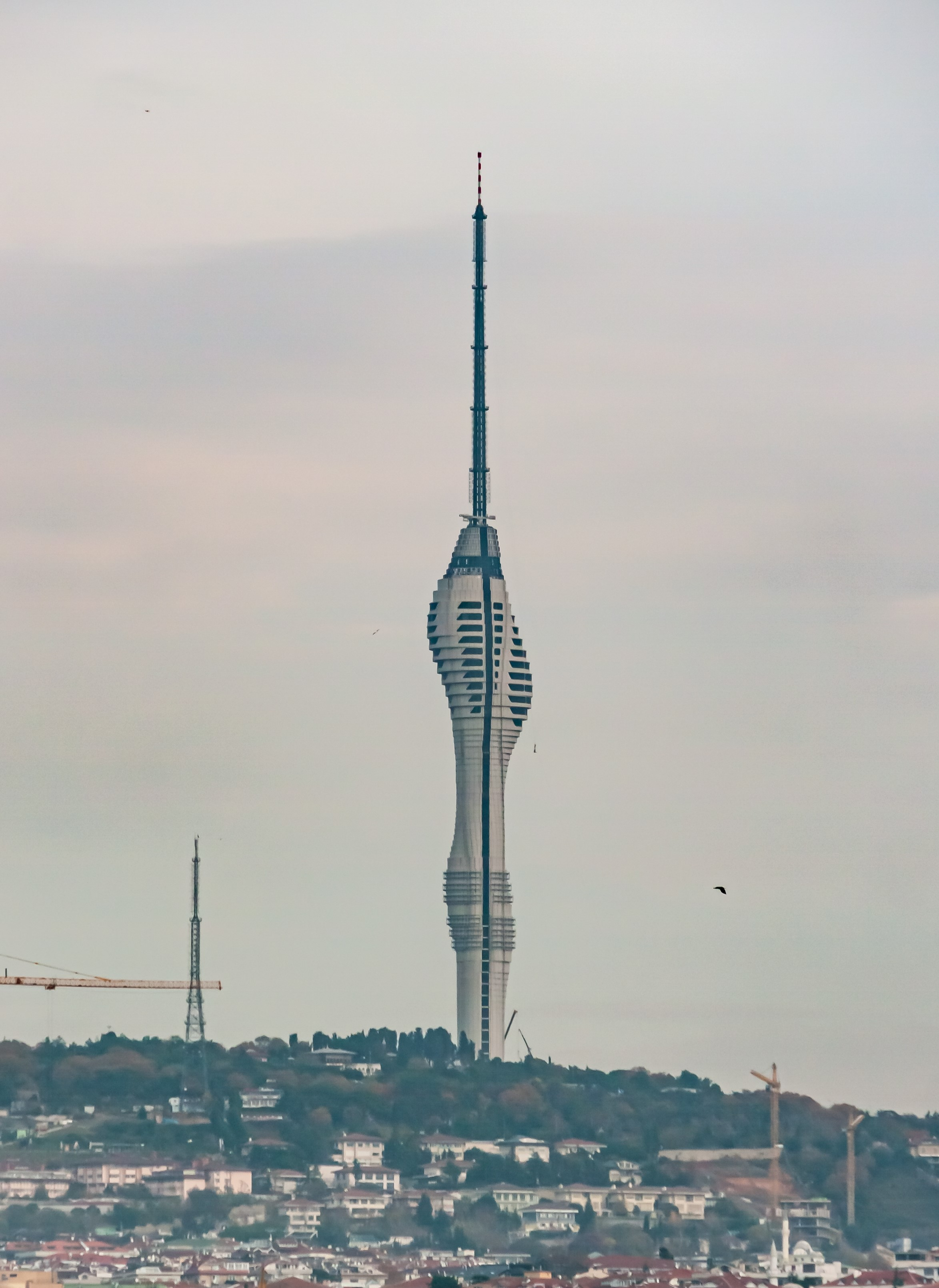
Küçük Çamlıca TV Radio Tower in Istanbul

Radio and Television Supreme Council (Turkish: Radyo ve Televizyon Üst Kurulu), also known in short as RTÜK, is the Turkish state agency for monitoring, regulating, and sanctioning radio and television broadcasts. RTÜK was founded in 1994 and is composed of nine members elected by the Grand National Assembly of Turkey. RTÜK is located in Ankara and maintains local offices in Istanbul, İzmir and Diyarbakir.

Telecommunications and information technology sectors fall under another state agency, the Information and Communication Technologies Authority (BTK).

RTÜK initiated the establishment of two international forums in the field of audio visual media services such as the Black Sea Broadcasting Regulatory Authorities Forum (BRAF) among 12 members of the Black Sea Economic Cooperation (BSEC) in 2009, and the Islamic Countries Broadcasting Regulatory Authorities Forum (IBRAF), an affiliate of the Organization of Islamic Cooperation (OIC), with its 57 member states, in 2011.

== Notable sanctions and penalties imposed by RTÜK ==
- RTÜK is known for sanctioning the broadcasts of a large number of domestic productions, such as Gülşen's video clip for the song "Sarışınım", on grounds of "violating the national and moral values of the community and Turkish family structure" (RTÜK Law Art. 4/e), "obscenity" (RTÜK Law Art. 4/t), and "impairing the physical, mental, and moral development of young people and children" (RTÜK Law Art. 4/z).
- Among foreign productions sanctioned by RTÜK for similar rationales are Wild Things 3,Nip/Tuck, and Gossip Girl. In September 2009, RTÜK banned the broadcasting of the video clip for the song "Love Sex Magic", stating that the video "contains sexual outfits, dancing and scenes that are contrary to the development of children and youth and morality in general."
- In another verdict in March 2011, RTÜK punished the broadcast of the feature film Sex and the City 2, due to the film's portraying a same-sex wedding ceremony, considered "twisted and immoral" by the RTÜK board.
- RTÜK also imposes closure orders on TV and radio stations on the grounds that they have made separatist broadcasts. A verdict of high international profile was the banning of Turkish language programmes of BBC World Service and Deutsche Welle on the grounds that they "threatened national security."
- Critics claim that verdicts of RTÜK resulted in excessive self-censorship of broadcasters.
- The "stream-lining" policies of RTÜK with that of the Turkish government is exemplified once more when they successively imposed huge monetary penalties to the producers of the TV series Behzat Ç. Bir Ankara Polisiyesi as well as the TV channel broadcasting it. The series explicitly demonstrate the corrupt policies and practices of the Turkish courts, governmental authorities, the bureaucrats, etc. and therefore is widely criticized by the ruling AKP (Justice and Development Party)-led Turkish government. The ministers of the government as well as many AKP MPs had explicitly criticized the TV series and asked the producers to stop production and the TV channel to stop broadcasting; however they had to back down amid extremely widespread protests of the spectators and fans of the series. As a result, the government is now (as of 2012) trying to press the producers and the TV channel by imposing huge monetary penalties on feeble claims such as "the violation the national and moral values of the community and Turkish family structure" (RTÜK Law Art. 4/e), "obscenity" (RTÜK Law Art. 4/t), and "the impairment of the physical, mental, and moral development of young people and children" (RTÜK Law Art. 4/z). RTÜK alleges that the major characters of the series "drink too much", "swear too much", "conduct behaviour against the moral values of the Turkish family life"-the latter just because the bachelor police chief is seeing a single (divorced) female prosecutor of state and that "they have a relationship out of wedlock". The first season of the series were heavily penalized by the RTÜK and the second season brought even more penalties of the RTÜK to the producers of the series and the broadcasting TV channel. As a result, when the second-season of the series finished in June 2012, all spectators and fans were pessimist on whether they will be watching a third-season. The third season started to air on September 21, 2012, but with a heavy censor on all conversations, extreme censor on scenes where the characters drink beer, etc. and consequently, the website of the TV channel broadcasting the series over the internet received more than 130,000 hits in the other day of the broadcast in just a couple of hours when word spread among fans that a "censor-free" version is available.

In February 2022 RTÜK demanded that three international news agencies - Voice of America, Euronews, and Germany's Deutsche Welle - apply for online broadcasting licenses. Deutsche Welle said it was an attempt "to restrict the reporting of international media services"; VOA issued a statement that it will not abide by RTÜK's demand for an online license, explaining that "the internet is not a limited resource, and the only possible purpose of a licensing requirement for internet distribution is enabling censorship".

After the 2025 Kartalkaya hotel fire killed at least 79 people, RTÜK chairman Ebubekir Şahin imposed a broadcasting ban on coverage of the fire. In response, the Workers' Party of Turkey's lawyers filed an objection to the decision.

On March 23, 2025, RTÜK stopped all live broadcasts on television as a measure against 2025 Turkish protests. RTÜK reminded broadcasters that they could be suspended from their air or stripped of their licences if they violated Turkish law. Potential violations of the law include: "calls for the public to take to the streets, statements on behalf of illegal organizations, biased broadcasting activities, statements and broadcasts that insult and threaten government officials, members of the judiciary, investigating officers, security services and law enforcement agencies". Republican People's Party deputy chairman Ali Mahir Başarır responded to RTÜK's statement, stating: "Chinese TV is broadcasting live here, but Halk TV, Sözcü, Tele 1 cannot”, criticising RTÜK's alleged double standards for independent broadcasters as opposed to those linked to the government.

Gurkan Ozturan of Freedom House argued that RTÜK had been increasingly using "vague notions of public morality to justify arbitrary fines and broadcast bans, primarily targeting independent and opposition-leaning networks."

=== Others ===
- Gün Radyo ve TV in 2002 ordered off air for a year for broadcasting Kurdish-language songs
- Günlük case
- Nur Radyo Ve Televizyon Yayinciligi A.S. v. Turkey (no. 2) (ECHR 2010 - judgement of breach of Article 2010)

=== Website blockings ===
RTÜK may request that access to broadcasting services/websites be blocked if they have not been granted a temporary or permanent broadcasting license, or if their right and/or license has been revoked.

- Music streaming platform Tidal (service) was banned in November 2020 upon the request of RTÜK and was blocked until December 2020.
- Upon the request of RTÜK, ozguruz20.org domain name that belongs to web radio station Özgürüz, which is run by the nonprofit newsroom Correctiv was blocked.
- Radio Garden which is a non-profit radio listening project has been banned since 4 January 2022.
- On 30 June 2022, Deutsche Welle and Voice of America's websites have been banned in Turkey upon the request of RTÜK.

== RTÜK's family projects ==
Besides sanctioning broadcasts, RTÜK also leads some projects purportedly "to protect children and to help parents in media environment". These projects are:

- Media literacy (Medya Okur-Yazarlığı)
- Smart signs (Akıllı İşaretler) projects aims at a rating system similar to television rating systems in other countries.
- Internet safety (İnternet Güvenliği)
- Good Night Kids (İyi Uykular Çocuklar) is a cartoon show that aims at children's gaining habits of going to bed early.

== Law ==
Prior to 1994, television and radio broadcasts were only permitted by the state. The Law No. 3984 on the Establishment of Radio and Television Enterprises and their Broadcasts, dated 13 April 1994 liberalised this, allowing an explosion of private media. The 1994 law was replaced by Law No. 6112 on the Establishment of Radio and Television Enterprises, which came into force on 15 February 2011.

== See also ==
- List of ECHR cases concerning Article 10 in Turkey
