= Press Advertisement Institution =

Public legal entity of the Turkish government

- Basın İlan Kurumu
- Official patch of BIK
- Nickname: BIK
- Formation: 1961; 65 years ago
- Founded at: Turkey
- Type: Government organization
- Legal status: Public legal entity
- Purpose: advertisement
- Headquarters: Interior Door No: 119, Platform Merter, A Block, Floor: 2 PK:34173, Güngören
- Location: Istanbul, Turkey
- Origins: Turkish
- Region served: Turkey
- Services: Newspaper display advertising
- Methods: Display ads
- Fields: Journalism
- Members: Grand National Assembly of Turkey
- Official language: Turkish, English
- Owner: Government of Turkey
- General manager: Cavit Erkilinc
- Main organ: Grand National Assembly of Turkey
- Secessions: Preparation Seminars For The Media of Future, Istanbul; Sounds of the New Seminars Anatolia, Karabük; National Literature Workshop; Kosgeb Development and Support Programs for Local Press and Media Enterprises, Ankara; Earthquake Zone Media Center and Accommodation Tent, Van; Sports Press Education Seminar; Internet and Media Education Seminar, Rize; Artistic Faces Activities from the Printing World, Istanbul; Experience Sharing Days Seminars in Media Communication, Tirebolu; Osman Yuksel Serdengecti Documentary; Remember of Mehmet Akif Ersoy; 50th Year in the Profession Honor Awards
- Affiliations: Directorate of Communications
- Revenue: ▲₺416 million (2020)
- Funding: Newspaper ads
- Website: bik.gov.tr

The Press Advertisement Institution (Turkish: Basın İlan Kurumu; BIK), also known as the Press Advertisement Agency, is a public legal entity of the government of Turkey responsible for distribution of government ads to the Turkish newspapers, including private and state-owned. Established in 1961 under the Law No. 195, it is affiliated with the Directorate of Communications and works under the 36 members elected from the Grand National Assembly of Turkey. Members are divided into three groups such as "Press", "Government" and "Impartial".

== Composition ==
Besides being reviewed by 42 members from the Grand Assembly, the organisation consists of the auditors and the board of directors, which represents it in an equal manner, including its head office and all branches across the country. It is headed by a general manager and is headquartered in three different locations Istanbul, Ankara and İzmir.

== Background ==
BIK also serves as the largest archive of digital newspapers and has recorded the maximum number of digital newspapers in the country. It also impose sanctions on newspapers and news websites from displaying official advertisements under the press ethics principles, and journalism ethics and standards. If any newspaper running in the country violates the law of Turkey face legal action by cutting down its ads.

The organization also provides newspapers with assistance in obtaining interest-free loans. Minority communities such as Greek, Armenian and Jewish are also given financial assistance for running newspapers under the Treaty of Lausanne.

== Selection ==
BIK held elections for the selection of its members. Newspapers owners who comply with the Press Advertisement Institution legislation and the Article 3 of the Press Advertisement Institution Regulation are also entitled to participate in the election.

== Revenue ==
BIK has raised ₺53.5 million revenue in 2002 which increased to ₺416 million in 2020. It runs various types of ads in different categories such as real estate, vehicles, personnel recruitment, academic staff and training announcements, tender notification, bankruptcy law cases, and notifications and announcements among other.

Official Announcement Amounts (2000–2020)

#	Year	Official Advertisement Amount (₺)
1	2000	6,570,837,71
2	2001	9,737,947.92
3	2002	22,976,000,00
4	2003	31.187.000.00
5	2004	42.004,000.00
6	2005	45,691,000,00
7	2006	54,862,000,00
8	2007	69.620.000.00
9	2008	76.900.000.00
10	2009	99.976.0000.00
11	2010	117,931,000,00
12	2011	129,925,000,00
13	2012	129,925,000,00
14	2013	142,834,000,00
15	2014	187,565,596.37
16	2015	242,118,856,80
17	2016	265,134.379.41
18	2017	278,671,820.38
19	2018	288,893,245,77
20	2019	329,688,813,71
21	2020	322.002.849.44
Total	2000–2020	2,926.532,347.51

== Criticism ==
BIK is accused of giving more preference to pro-government newspapers than being a neutral entity. Reports suggest that it gives 78% of the government ads to pro-government newspapers and has arguably reduced 97% of ads to those newspapers who oppose the government policies. Government supporters has utilised ₺141 million 932 932 thousand Turkish lira of the public funds while nine newspapers including Sözcü, Cumhuriyet, BirGün, Evrensel, and Korkusuz experienced 97 percent ad penalties by the government.

The European Centre for Press and Media Freedom indicated that the government of Turkey banned independent media in the country from displaying official advertisements on their newspapers. Evrensel has experienced indefinite sanctions for its role in critical reportage. It was banned in September 2019 until 28 March 2020. However, BIK assured lifting of ban after it held a meeting with the International Press Institute (IPI), Journalists Syndicate of Turkey (TGS), Committee to Protect Journalists (CPJ), Reporters sans Frontières (RSF) and the European Federation of Journalists (EFJ).
