= D-Smart =

Turkish satellite broadcasting platform

- Type: Satellite network (movies, sports, original programming)
- Country: Bağcılar, Istanbul, Turkey
- Availability: Worldwide
- Owner: Demirören Group
- Key people: Yıldırım Demirören
- Launch date: 2007
- Official website: www.dsmart.com.tr

D-Smart is a Turkish satellite television provider launched in 2007. It launched high-definition television broadcasts in 2008. By late 2012, D-Smart had around 1.6m subscribers, of which around half were free-to-air customers; revenues were around EUR350m.
