= Kanal D =

Turkish television channel

- Country: Turkey
- Broadcast area: Turkey; Middle East and North Africa

Programming
- Language: Turkish
- Picture format: 1080i HDTV

Ownership
- Owner: Demirören Group
- Sister channels: Cartoon Network; Çocuk Smart; D Spor; D Hipodrom; Euro D; D Max; T.A.Y. TV; TV2

History
- Launched: 20 September 1993 (SD); 1 September 2008 (HD)

Links
- Website: www.kanald.com.tr

Availability

Terrestrial
- D-Smart: Channel 22 (HD)
- Tivibu: Channel 23 (HD)
- Turkcell#Turkcell TV+: Channel 22 (HD)
- Digiturk: Channel 24 (HD)

Streaming media
- kanald.com.tr: Watch (free)
- netd.com: Watch HD (free)

Kanal D (English: Channel D) is a national television channel in Türkiye that is part of Demirören Group. It was founded by Ayhan Şahenk and Aydın Doğan in 1993.

The network has also run an international channel, Euro D, since 1996, which is available online, and had the first high definition channel in Turkey, Kanal D HD.

The text 'KANAL D' is not displayed in its Turkish broadcast. Only the blue earth section of the logo is displayed throughout commercial sections. (Note: Turkish Radio Law requires TV broadcasters have distinct logos during regular content and commercials. These logos serve as call signs of the station. Public service clips can be shown with either logo.) Kanal D is broadcast via satellite to 27 countries.

== Kanal D HD ==
Kanal D started its high definition broadcasting on October 1, 2006 under the name DHDTV. It is Türkiye's first national high definition television channel. After stopping its broadcasts for a short while, it started broadcasting again on September 1, 2008 on the D-Smart platform under the name Kanal D HD.

However, on September 18, 2014, it continued its broadcast on Türksat 4A without encryption and free of charge.

== Kanal D Romania ==
On 18 February 2007, Kanal D launched a television channel in Romania under the same name. It remains under the ownership by Doğan Holding, while the rest of Kanal D brand has been sold to Demirören Group in 2018.

Unlike the Turkish Kanal D, the Romania channel mostly broadcast shows instead of Serial films.

== Kanal D International ==
An international version of the channel is operated by Demirören Group which showcases popular Turkish series. It was launched in Turkey on December 16, 1993, before launching in Germany in 1996. The channel now operates worldwide. Each of the individual channels broadcasts with a local schedule, advertising, dubbing and subtitling unique to each territory.

== Programs broadcast by Kanal D ==
Kanal D Turkey focuses on original programming.

=== Weekly series ===
This is a list of television programs that have been broadcast on Kanal D before or are currently being broadcast.

- 2024: Uzak Şehir (Far Away) (Monday at 20:00)
- 2025: Eşref Rüya (Wednesday at 20:00)
- 2006: Arka Sokaklar (Back Streets) Friday at 20:00)
- 2025: Güller ve Günahlar (Roses and Sins) (Saturday at 20:00)
- 2026: Daha 17 (Torn Apart) (Sunday at 20:00)

== See also ==
- Kanal D International
- Kanal D Romania
