= Demirören Group =

Turkish conglomerate company

- Type: Holding
- Industry: Energy, industry, real estate, construction, media, education
- Founded: 1956; 70 years ago in Istanbul, Turkey
- Founder: Erdoğan Demirören
- Key people: Yıldırım Demirören, Tayfun Demirören, Meltem Demirören
- Revenue: US$3 billion (2012)
- Website: www.demiroren.com.tr/en/

Demirören Group is a Turkish conglomerate company. Its properties include Milangaz (a liquefied petroleum gas distributor with 9% share of the Turkish market), the Demirören İstiklal shopping mall in Taksim Square, as well as several newspapers, television and radio stations, and also a subscription-based streaming service called D-Smart Go. Demirören also handles the licensing and distribution of Turkish Skydance channels: Cartoon Network and CNN Türk. All shares of the Demirören Group are owned by the Demirören family, who have close ties to President Recep Tayyip Erdoğan and are also active in the energy, mining, and construction sectors.

== History ==
Demirören acquired the newspapers Milliyet and Vatan in May 2011. In 2018, the holding bought the newspaper Hürriyet, Posta and the TV channels Kanal D, CNN Türk, and D-Smart and all other media properties of Doğan Media Group, with the ехception of Kanal D Romania Slow Türk and Dream Türk Radio Dream FM.

Following the death of Erdoğan Demirören, President Erdoğan visited the family to extend his condolences. The family is generally seen as being supportive of President Erdoğan and the Justice and Development Party.

In February 2021, the company took over Azerbaijan's lottery company ''Azerlotereya''.
