= List of newspapers in Turkey =

In Turkey there were 141 newspapers in 1941 of which total circulation was nearly 60,000 copies. The number of newspapers became 2002 in 1946.

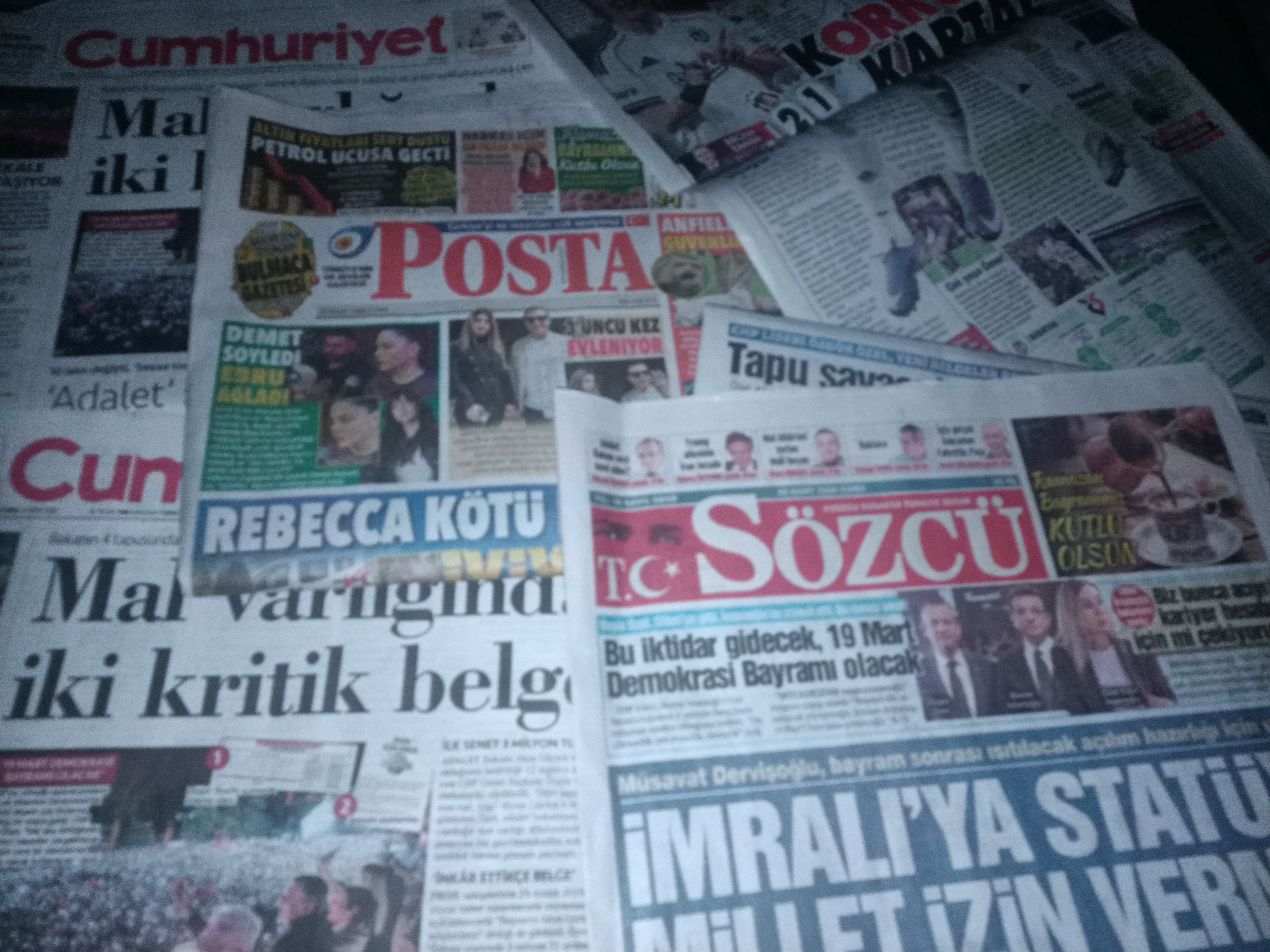
Newspapers of Turkey

== List of national newspapers in Turkey ==
Below is a list of national printed newspapers published in Turkey. Initial sort order is by weekly circulation (as of 02.05.2016 - 08.05.2016).

Rank	Name	Frequency	Political alignment	Circulation	Owner
1	Hürriyet	Daily	Mainstream, centre	341,805	Demirören Group
2	Sabah	Daily	Right-wing, Pro AKP	313,142	Turkuvaz Media Group
3	Posta	Daily	Mainstream, tabloid	306,752	Demirören Group
4	Sözcü	Daily	Centre-left, social democracy	288,649	Estetik Publishing
5	Habertürk	Daily	Centre-right	220,563	Ciner Media Group
6	Fotomaç	Daily	Sports	153,019	Turkuvaz Media Group
7	Türkiye	Daily	Conservative, right-wing	149,566	İhlas Media Holding
8	Milliyet	Daily	Centre-right	143,803	Demirören Group
9	Fanatik	Daily	Sports	118,920	Demirören Group
10	Yeni Şafak	Daily	Islamism, conservative, right-wing	107,514	Albayrak Group
11	Takvim	Daily	Right-wing populism	106,185	Turkuvaz Media Group
12	Akşam	Daily	Conservative, right-wing	104,506	Turkish Media
13	Güneş	Daily		104,150	Turkish Media
14	Star	Daily	Conservative	103,473	Doğuş Media Group
15	Vatan	Daily		102,743	Demirören Group
16	Yeniçağ	Daily	Nationalism, Kemalism	51,757	Yeniçağ Gazetecilik ve Matbaacılık
17	Yeni Mesaj	Daily	Conservative, denominational	51,708	
18	Cumhuriyet	Daily	Social democracy, centre-left	51,695	Cumhuriyet Foundation
19	Yarına Bakış	Daily		51,219	
20	Aydınlık	Daily	Socialism, Kemalism, left-wing	50,773	Mehmet Sabuncu
21	İstiklal	Daily		50,523	
22	Milat	Daily	Islamism, conservatism	50,362	
23	Diriliş Postası	Daily	Islamism, conservatism	50,072	
24	Korkusuz	Daily	Nationalism, Kemalism	39,177	
25	Özgür Düşünce	Daily		37,142	
26	Karar	Daily		36,414	
27	Meydan	Daily		36,210	
28	Yeni Birlik	Daily		34,591	
29	Milli Gazete	Daily	Islamism, conservatism	30,909	
30	Yeni Asır	Daily	Centre-right	26,449	
31	BirGün	Daily	Socialism, left-wing, pro-European	20,310	
32	Şok	Daily	Tabloid, populism	18,556	
33	AMK Spor	Daily	Sports	16,531	Estetik Publishing
34	Yeni Asya	Daily	Islamism, conservatism, far-right	16,396	Mehmet Kutlular
35	Vahdet	Daily	Islamism, conservatism	13,582	Tek Vahdet Yayıncılık
36	Yenisöz	Daily		10,317	
37	Günboyu	Daily		10,304	
38	Dokuz Sütun	Daily		10,300	
39	Yeni Yüzyıl	Daily		8,051	
40	Daily Sabah	Daily	English, Centre-right	7,380	Turkuvaz Media Group
41	Evrensel	Daily	Far-left, social equity	7,346	
42	Özgür Gündem	Daily	Kurdish nationalism	6,919	Ziya Çiçekci
43	Yurt	Daily	Kemalism, left-wing	5,458	
44	Ortadoğu	Daily	Nationalism, far-right	5,138	
45	Hürriyet Daily News	Daily	English, Mainstream, centre	4,032	Demirören Group
46	Yeni Akit	Daily	Far-right, social conservatism		
47	Sporlive	Daily	Sports		

== Newspapers in other languages ==
Below is a list of foreign-language newspapers published in Turkey.

Name	Frequency	Language(s)	Circulation	Owner
Türkiye Today	Daily	English		İhlas Media Group
Daily Sabah	Daily	English	7,380	Turkuvaz Media Group
Hürriyet Daily News	Daily	English	4,032	Doğan Media Group
Good Morning Turkey	Daily	English		
BGN News	Daily	English		
Aydınlık	Daily	English		
Made in Turkey	Monthly	English		
Şalom	Weekly	Ladino^{*}		
Agos	Weekly	Armenian^{*}		
Marmara	Daily	Armenian		
Jamanak	Daily	Armenian		
Azadiya Welat	Daily	Kurdish	1,022	
Aujourd'hui la Turquie	Monthly	French^{*}		
Apoyevmatini		Greek		
İho (Yankı)		Greek		
Ağani Murutsxi	Monthly	Laz, Hemşince, Romeyka		
Yeni Şafak	Daily	English		
Türkische Post	Daily	German		

== Local newspapers ==
Adana

- Adana Haber
- Adana Yerel Haber
- Başak Gazetesi
- Bölge
- Ekspres Gazetesi
- Esenler Haber
- Medya Yenigün
- Yeni Adana
- Yeni Gün

Adıyaman

- Adıyaman Haber
- Çağdaş Gölbaşı

Afyonkarahisar

- Afyon Haber
- Afyon Odak
- Gazete Gerçek
- Sandıklı Haber

Ardahan

- Ardahan Gazetesi
- Ardahan Nâme Gazetesi
- Ardahan Newspaper
- Ardahan Rojname

Amasya

- Bilgi Gazetesi

Ankara

- Gazete Ankara
- Sonsöz Gazetesi

Antalya

- Akdeniz Beyaz
- Akdeniz Gerçek
- Akdeniz Haber
- Akdeniz Manşet
- Akdeniz Telgraf
- Akseki'nin Sesi
- Alanya
- Antalya
- Antalya Gündem
- Ayyıldız Toros
- Demokrat Gazete
- Ekspres
- Gazete Bir
- Hilal
- Hürses
- İleri
- Kemer Gözcü
- Kent
- Manavgat Gazetesi
- Manavgat Nehir
- Manavgat'ın Sesi Gazetesi
- Son Haber
- Yeni Alanya
- Yeni Yüzyıl

Artvin

- 08 Haber
- Artvin Medya
- Artvin Gazetesi
- Çoruh Postası

Aydın

- Aydın Denge
- Aydın Ses
- Hedef Gazetesi
- Mücadele Gazetesi

Balıkesir

- Ayvalık Sözcü
- Balıkesir. Gazetesi
- İlk Haber
- Körfez'in Sesi Gazetesi

Batman

- Batman Çağdaş
- Batman Doğuş
- Batman Express
- Batman Gazetesi
- Batman Haber Portalı
- Batman Postası

Bayburt

- Yeşil Bayburt Gazetesi

Bingöl

- Bingöl Gazetesi
- Bingöl'ün Sesi

Bolu

- Bolu Express
- Bolu Gündem
- Bolu Olay
- Bolu'da Yenihayat
- Bolu'nun Sesi
- Geredemiz
- Yeni Ufuk

Burdur

- Burdurlu'nun Sesi
- Hedef Gazetesi

Bursa

- Bursa Hakimiyet
- Bursa Olay Gazetesi
- Bursa.com
- Bursada Bugün
- Kent Gazetesi

Çanakkale

- Ayvacık Gazetesi
- Burası Çanakkale
- Çanakkale Haber
- Çanakkale Olay
- Gazete Boğaz
- Gelibolu
- Lapseki Gazetesi

Çankırı

- Çankırı'nın Sesi

Çorum

- Çorum Dost Haber
- Çorum Haber

Denizli

- Demokrasi Zemini
- Denizli Haber
- Denizlili

Diyarbakır

- Diyarbakır
- Diyarbakır Gazetesi
- Diyarbakır Söz
- Güneydoğu Ekspres

Düzce

- Düzce Damla Gazetesi

Edirne

- Edirne Gazetesi
- Gündem Edirne
- Edirne'nin Sesi
- Trakya Net Haber
- Trakya'nın Sesi

Elazığ

- Elaziz.net

Erzincan

- Özsöz Gazetesi
- Erzincan Gazetesi
- Erzincan Birlik Gazetesi

Erzurum

- Erzurum Gazetesi

Eskişehir

- Eshaber
- Eskişehir Sakarya

Gaziantep

- Güncel Gazetesi
- Olay Medya

Giresun

- Giresun Işık
- Özbulancak Gazetesi

Hakkâri

- Yüksekova Haber

Hatay

- Antakya Gazetesi
- Hatay Gazetesi
- Hürhaber
- Kardelen Gazetesi
- Kırıkhan.net
- Özyurt

Iğdır

- Çağdaş Gazetesi
- Güven Gazetesi
- Hudut Gazetesi
- Yeşil Iğdır Gazetesi

Isparta

- Gülses
- Isparta Manşet

İskenderun

- Güney Gazetesi

Istanbul

- Ataköy Gazete
- Sarıyer Gazetesi
- Bakırköy Postası
- Beşiktaş Gazetesi
- Sarıyer Posta Gazetesi
- Bölge Gazetesi
- Çağdaş Kadıköy
- Esenler Haber
- Gazete Beşiktaş
- Sarıyer Haberleri
- Gazete Boğaz
- Güzel Vatan
- Kartal Gazetesi
- Sarıyer Newspaper
- Özden Gazetesi
- Pendik Son Söz
- Yaşam Gazetesi
- Yerel Haber
- Yöremiz

İzmir

- Aliağa Ekspres
- Demokrat Aliağa
- Demokrat Urla
- Gazete Karşıyakalı
- Haber Ekspres
- İzmir Son Dakika

- Kuşadası Haber
- Kuzey Ege
- Menderes Postası
- Menemen'in Sesi
- Yarım Ada
- Yeni Asır

Kahramanmaraş

- Elbistan'ın Sesi
- Kahraman Maraş Gazetesi
- Kayzen
- Kent Maraş

Kars

- Kars Gazetesi
- Kars Postası
- Kars Rojname
- The Kars Newspaper
- Siyasal Birikim

Kastamonu

- Kastamonu Postası

Kayseri

- Kayseri Gündem
- Kayseri Haber

Kırıkkale

- Yeşilyurt Gazetesi

Kilis

- Kilis Postası

Kocaeli

- Bizim Kocaeli
- Gebze Gazetesi
- Gebze Haber
- Haberci 41
- Kocaeli Gazetesi
- Öncü Haber
- Özgür Kocaeli
- Yeni Haber

Konya

- Çumra Postası
- Hakimiyet
- İlk Haber
- İstasyon Gazetesi
- Memleket Gazetesi
- Merhaba Gazetesi
- Pervasız (Akşehir)
- Yeni Konya
- Yeni Meram

Karaman

- Anadolu Manşet
- Karaman'da Uyanış
- Yeşil Ermenek

Kütahya

- Bizim Tavşanlı
- Kütahya Gazetesi
- Tavşanlı'nın Sesi
- Tellal
- Yeni Kütahya

Malatya

- Darende Haber
- Malatya Haber
- Malatyam.com
- Son Söz Gazetesi

Manisa

- Manisa Haber

Mersin

- Güney Gazetesi
- Mersin Haber
- Mersin Radikal Gazetesi
- Tarsus Haber
- Telgraf Türk
- Haber Postası
- Mersin Blok Haber
- Tarsus Gazetesi
- Çamlıyayla Haber

Muğla

- Bodrum Yarımada
- Güney Ege
- Marmaris Gündem
- Marmaris Sun
- Muğla Haber

Osmaniye

- Başak Gazetesi
- Düziçi Erdem Gazetesi
- Erdem Gazetesi

Sakarya

- Adapazarı Gazetesi
- Bizim Sakarya
- Sakarya Akşam Gazetesi
- Sakarya Yenigün
- Sakarya Yenihaber
- Yeni Sakarya

Samsun

- Halk Gazetesi
- Kuzey Haber

Siirt

- Siirt Mücadele Gazetesi

Sivas

- Gürün Haber
- Sivas Haber
- Sivas Hakikat
- Sivas Postası
- Sularbasi-Haber/Gürün
- Yeni Ülke

Şanlıurfa

- Güneydoğu Gazetesi
- Şanlıurfa
- Sivas Haberler/Urfa
- Urfa Haber
- "Urfa Haber Tv"

Tekirdağ

- Çerkezköy Haber
- Şarköy'ün Sesi

Tokat

- Yeşil Niksar

Trabzon

- Akçaabat Yeni Haber
- Bölgede Gündem
- Hüryol
- Karadeniz Gazetesi
- Karadeniz Haber
- Karadeniz'den Günebakış
- Kuzey Ekspres Gazetesi
- Pulathanehaber
- Taka
- Trabzon'un Sesi
- Türk Sesi Gazetesi
- Yerel spor

Yalova

- Yalova 77
- Yalova Life

Yozgat

- Sorgun Postası

Zonguldak

- Değişim Gazetesi
- Karabük Net
- Zonguldak Net

Karadeniz Ereğli

- Değişim Gazetesi

== Online newspapers ==
These are official online newspapers on the Alexa Top 100 list.

- En Son Haber
- Haberler
- Gazete Banka
- Haber.com.tr
- Kral Gazetesi
- Haber.org
- Ardahan Newspaper
- Cumhuriyet Gazetesi
- Gazeta Tr
- Sabah Gazetesi
- İnternet Haber
- Newspaper.Tr
- Newspapers-info tr
- Mynet Haber
- NtvMsnbc
- Lagiye
- Gazete Oku
- Turkey News
- Nâme Gazetesi
- imparator Gazetesi
- star Gazetesi
- Wall Street Journal Türkiye
