= Fatih Altaylı =

Turkish journalist (born 1962)

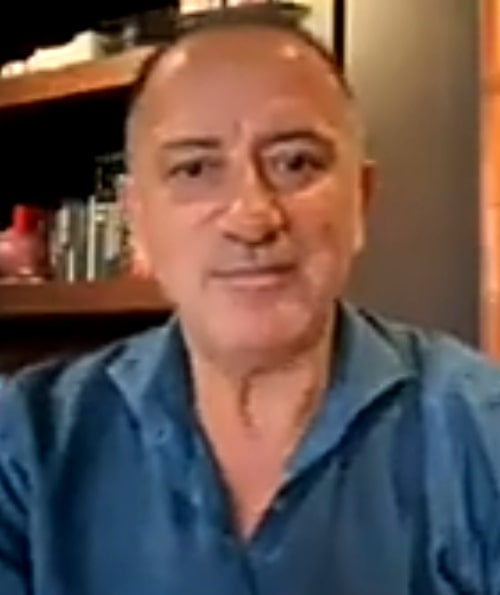
- Altaylı in 2020
- Born: 20 September 1962 (age 63); Van, Turkey
- Education: Galatasaray High School; Boğaziçi University Faculty of Economics and Administrative Sciences (dropped out); Istanbul University Faculty of Communication (dropped out)
- Occupations: Journalist, columnist, TV presenter and media executive
- Years active: 1982–present
- Spouse: Hande Altaylı
- Children: 1
- Website: www.fatihaltayli.com.tr

Fatih Altaylı (born 20 September 1962) is a Turkish journalist, columnist, television presenter and media executive. He hosted the programmes Teke Tek, Teke Tek Special and Teke Tek Bilim on Habertürk TV and Bire Bir on Bloomberg HT. Altaylı is the recipient of the "Honour Award for Contribution to Education" given jointly by TİKA and the European Federation of Journalists. Altaylı is recognized as one of the most famous and influential names in the Turkish journalism community. He is also one of the co-founders of the campaigns "Haydi Kızlar Okula", a campaign to support girls enrolment in school, implemented in cooperation with UNICEF and the Ministry of National Education, "Sürekli Aydınlık İçin Bir Dakika Karanlık", an act of civil disobedience led by lawyer Ergin Cinmen and the Citizens' Initiative for Continuous Light founded on 1 February 1997 and "Temiz İnternet", a campaign organised in order to raise social awareness against violence, child pornography and similar publications on the Internet.

== Career ==
He was born on 20 September 1962 in Van. After attending primary and secondary school at Çavuşoğlu College, he continued his education at Galatasaray High School, from where he graduated. After attending Boğaziçi University Faculty of Economics and Administrative Sciences for a while, he left the school and transferred to Istanbul University Faculty of Communication in 1984. However, he left this school without receiving his diploma. Altaylı stepped into journalism at the newspaper Cumhuriyet as a sports reporter in 1982. After Cumhuriyet, he worked at Gelişim Meydan. Then he moved to Günaydın and Güneş newspapers. He worked as editor-in-chief for a short amount of time at Gelişim Yayınları. Later, he held various positions in the Asil Nadir Group, including board membership and chairmanship. After the Güneş newspaper was closed down in 1992, Altaylı went to military service. In 1993, after returning from military service he co-founded the radio station Best FM. From 1995 on, Altaylı continued with broadcasting at Show Radio for about one year. The same year, he was appointed news presenter at the sister media Show TV channel. In addition, he started to present his own program Teke Tek (One to One).

In 1996, Altaylı transferred to Doğan Media Group. While writing his column at Hürriyet, he was tasked with the post of a coordinator at Radio D in the same media group. In the summer of 2002, Fatih Altaylı was appointed top executive of the television channel Kanal D.

In 2005, he parted ways with Doğan Media Group and joined Sabah Media Group, his Teke Tek programme broadcast on Kanal D was transferred to atv and he continued his columns in Sabah. He worked as editor-in-chief at Sabah. He resigned in 2007 after the TMSF seized Sabah newspaper and atv due to financial problems of the former owner Dinç Bilgin. Altaylı worked a while as a freelancer writing at his own website before he was appointed the top executive of the newly established newspaper Habertürk in January 2009. During his time as a freelancer, he had also been working as a news presenter at the television channel Kanal 1. He had also presented the program Teke Tek at Ciner owned sister media channel Habertürk TV, which he had joined in 2008 and worked for until his resignation in 2023.

On 29 March 2014, he resigned as the editor-in-chief of Habertürk newspaper due to the pressure.

Between 2001 and 2002, he served as the second president of Galatasaray SK under Mehmet Cansun, from which he was expelled from on 27 April 2021. Fatih Altaylı's expulsion decision was cancelled by the decision of the majority members at the 2020 numbered ordinary general assembly meeting held on 17 October 2021. He made an eventful thank you speech to the Galatasaray Council Board, stating, "I would like to thank my board for not approving the unlawful dismissal decision of Mustafa Cengiz and his friends."

On 16 May 2023, Habertürk management terminated the broadcasts of Altaylı, including the Teke Tek programme.

On 17 May 2023, Altaylı announced that he had left Habertürk TV and the Habertürk newspaper, referring to Turgay Ciner, he stated: "As Turkey is entering a new phase, I should not be a burden to someone I call a friend. My freedom should not be his burden. Therefore, I believed that it was time to realise something that had been on my mind for some time. And yesterday, I talked to dear Kenan Tekdağ, whom I have worked very closely with and trusted for 15 years. We decided to part ways." In his last column in Habertürk's newspaper, Altaylı bid farewell to his readers with the title "Thanks to everyone who put up with me".

He currently writes columns on his own eponymous website and shoots content on his eponymous YouTube channel and Teke Tek Bilim. As of January 2024, his program Teke Tek has over 1000 episodes and 30 seasons.

Altaylı was arrested in Istanbul on 21 June 2025 for statements allegedly targeting President Recep Tayyip Erdoğan in a YouTube video. The Istanbul Chief Public Prosecutor's Office launched an investigation on charges of "threatening the president." Altaylı had said that, according to a poll, 70 percent of people in Turkey would oppose president Erdoğan's lifetime term. Altaylı argued that the Turkish people would not want to give up their right to vote. On 26 November 2025, Altaylı was sentenced to four years' imprisonment over the charges.

=== Political views ===
Although Altaylı has never revealed which party he voted for publicly during an election period, he has announced which parties he voted for in the past in the 'Perde Arkası' programme broadcast on BBN Türk and moderated by Journalist Talat Atilla and Tamer Korkmaz. Answering journalist Talat Atilla's question, "Which parties did you vote for?", Altaylı said, "I never voted for a conservative party. I never voted for MHP. I never voted for DYP. I may have voted for ANAP. I have never voted for right-wing parties."

In a section of his column titled "Tebrikler Burak Elmas Başkan" dated 20 June 2021, Altaylı wrote: "I have never seen the party I voted for win in Turkey except for two local elections." signifying that Altaylı had voted for CHP in previous elections.

== Controversies ==
Following the 2013 corruption scandal in Turkey, Altaylı was heavily criticized for allegedly manipulating the election polls by vote shifting from MHP to BDP to favor prime minister Recep Tayyip Erdoğan's party in a series of tape recordings that were leaked onto the internet, and for supposedly publishing an article at the request of Erdoğan, which led to firing of an editor and two journalists from Habertürk. In defence, Altaylı stated that the entirety of Turkish media was under pressure and said, "Every day there are instructions coming from somewhere. Everybody's scared." Altaylı, who also claimed that the audio recordings of him published on the internet were edited, stated "For years, everyone has been talking about pressure on the media. So what was the pressure on the media? How was it done? This is the first time that the pressure on the media has been revealed in the flesh and bones.", also adding on that he did not manipulate the polls, Altaylı stated that he published the results of the survey exactly as they were.

In his television program with COVID-19 as the main subject, he made an unprompted statement where he accused Syrian refugees of "Holding Turkey as hostage" and "Acting as a proxy for the Syrian government such that they have already won (against Turkey)", among other accusations such as "being exempt from law".

On 21 February 2023, the Directorate of Religious Affairs filed a lawsuit seeking a jail term of at least 6 months against Altaylı over "perverted" comments. The controversy began when Altaylı reacted to a response posted on the website of the Diyanet's High Council of Religious Affairs in the "FAQ from the earthquake zone" section. The response in question addressed the issue of foster families and stated, "There is no obstacle to marriage between the adopter and the adopted child." Taking issue with the response, Altaylı expressed his disapproval on Twitter, saying, "Well, we understand that you are really perverted, but what are you doing in an institution like Diyanet? Perverts. Go and get into the porn industry. Do not pollute the institution established by Atatürk to provide proper religious knowledge to the nation with your perverted imagination." Altaylı, who strongly criticized the religious body members statements, defended himself by asserting that his comments fell within the boundaries of freedom of expression.

In a column dated 28 December 2023, journalist Altaylı wrote that a Turkish Football Federation executive he interviewed said, "Ali Koç was the one who wanted the 2023 Turkish Super Cup, which was contested between Fenerbahçe and Galatasaray, to be played in Saudi Arabia". Both Fenerbahçe and the Turkish Football Federation denied Altaylı's claim: with the TFF; stating that the project and authorisation of the Super Cup final belongs to them, and has nothing to do with Ali Koç.

On 3 January 2024, Istanbul Chief Public Prosecutor's Office initiated an ex officio investigation against Altaylı for "praising the crime and the criminal" for his tweet "Health to your hand", regarding the incident in which university student Ege Akersoy punched İsmail Aydemir who opened the flag of the caliphate during his participation in the "Mercy for our Martyrs, Support for Palestine, Curse against Israel" march held in Istanbul on 1 January 2024. The Chief Public Prosecutor's Office also initiated a separate ex officio investigation against Altaylı for "publicly inciting and insulting a section of the public to hatred and hostility" due to the words he used against the participants of the "Rally to Curse Israel and PKK" held in Ankara in the video he posted on his YouTube channel on 24 December 2023. In defense, Altaylı stated that he did not specify a subject in his tweet and brought up the possibility that he may also be saying "thank you" to those who caught the puncher. He was later released on judicial controls. As a result, Altaylı was banned from leaving the country. Turkish scientist Celal Şengör was also present at the courthouse to support Altaylı.

On 3 January 2024, a verdict was reached in a lawsuit filed by Sabahattin Şirin against Altaylı. Şirin who is the ultras leader of Galatasaray's fan group ultrAslan, states that he filed the lawsuit over Altaylı allegedly insulting him. Istanbul 22nd Criminal Court of First Instance sentenced the defendant Altaylı to 7 months imprisonment for "publicly insulting in a chain". He was later released under judicial supervision.

=== Ownership of the Varagavank Monastery ===
There is controversy over his ownership of the Varagavank Monastery, which he inherited from his grandfather. When interviewed by Agos, he publicly said that he would return the monastery to the tourism board or Patriarchate so it could be renovated, but this has not been done. He claims that nobody in the government would respond to his requests, but at the same time did not even attempt to make an effort to give the deed to the Armenian Patriarchate. The only time he himself attempted to return it was right after a change of government in Van occurred, (the prior government were the ones who suggested the idea to restore it) resulting in the new government he asked having no interest in the restorations.

== Personal life ==
Fatih Altaylı is married to Hande Türel. The couple have one child named Zeynep. Altaylı is a Galatasaray supporter.

== Media ==
Newspapers

- Cumhuriyet (1982–1987)
- Güneş (1987–1992)
- Hürriyet (1995–2005)
- Sabah (2005–2007)
- Habertürk (2009–2023)

Radio stations

- Best FM (1993–1995)
- Show Radio (1995–1996)
- Radyo D (1996–2002)

Television channels

- Show TV (1995–1996)
- Kanal D (1996–2005)
- atv (2005–2007)
- Kanal 1 (2007–2008)
- Habertürk TV (2008–2023)

== Awards ==
- Honour Award for Contribution to Education, 2006
- TASAM Strategic Visionary Journalist - Writer Award, 2008
- Turkish Physics Society Special Honour Award, 2017
