= List of defunct newspapers of Turkey =

The following is the list of the defunct newspapers published in Turkey. (Only those disestablished in the Republican era)

Name	Foundation date	Owner	Disestablishment date
Ant	1967	Ant Yayınları (Ant Publications)	1971
Ateş	1995	Dinç Bilgin	1999
Devrim	1969	Cemal Reşit Eyüboğlu	1971
Günaydın	1968	Haldun Simavi	1998
Hakimiyet-i Milliye	1920	Republican People's Party	1934
Hür Vatan	1961	Ahmet Emin Yalman	1963
Günlük	2009		2011
Referans	1996	Doğan Media Group	2010
Radikal	1996	Doğan Media Group	2016
Tan	1935		1945
Tanin	1908		1947
Tercüman	1997	Çukurova Media Group	2010
Ulus	1934 & 1955	Republican People's Party	1953 & 1971
Vatan	1923 & 1940	Ahmet Emin Yalman	1925 & 1978
Vatan	2002	Demirören Holding	2018
Yeni İstanbul	1964	Habib Edip Törehan	1981
Yeni Ülke	1990		1993
Yeni Yüzyıl	1994		1999
Zafer	1949	Mümtaz Faik Fenik	1960
Zaman	1986	Feza Publications	2016
