= Ciner Media Group =

Turkish media conglomerate

- Industry: Publishing, Broadcasting
- Founded: 2007; 19 years ago
- Headquarters: Üsküdar, Turkey
- Area served: Turkey
- Key people: Turgay Ciner
- Parent: TMSF
- Website: www.cinermediagroup.com

Ciner Media Group (Ciner Medya Grubu) is a Turkish media conglomerate established in 2007, part of the Ciner Holding conglomerate. Among other properties, it owns the Habertürk newspaper, Habertürk TV and Habertürk Radyo, and the television stations Kanal 1, Show TV and 7/24 Spor. It co-owns the television station Bloomberg HT. It also publishes a range of magazines, including Turkish editions of international magazines such as FHM.

From 2005 to 2007 it owned Sabah; the newspaper was seized by the government's TMSF. From 2005 to 2007 it owned the ATV television station. It had previously operated both under license from Dinç Bilgin's Medya Group.

Ciner acquired the Habertürk properties in 2007 and Show TV in 2013.

== Properties ==
=== Newspapers ===
- 2009–: Habertürk

=== Television ===
- 2005–2010, 2025–: Kanal 1
- 2007–: Habertürk TV (acquired from Ufuk Güldemir.)
- 2010–: Bloomberg HT
- 2013–: Show TV (Bought from TMSF.)
- 2013–: ShowMax (Bought from TMSF.)
- 2013–: Show Türk (Bought from TMSF.)
- 2024–: HT Spor

=== Radio ===
- 2007–: Habertürk Radyo
- 2010–: Bloomberg HT Radyo
- 2024–: HT Spor Radyo

=== Sport club ===
- Kasımpaşa SK

== Old properties ==
=== Newspapers ===
- 2002–2007: Sabah
- 2002–2007: Takvim
- 2002–2007: Fotomaç
- 2002–2007: Yeni Asır
- 2005: Bugün (Became a partner with Mehmet Ali Ilıcak and sold it to Akın İpek)

=== Television ===
- 2002–2003: M TV
- 2002–2006: Yeni TV
- 2002–2007: atv (acquired from Ahmet Çalık.)
- 2002–2007: atv avrupa (acquired from Ahmet Çalık.)
- 2003–2004: 10 TV
- 2004–2007: TürkÇ TV (sold to TMSF.)
- 2004–2005: Merkez TV

=== Radio ===
- 2000–2006: Yeni Radyo (acquired from Dinç Bilgin)
- 2008–2010: Poptürk
- 2015: HT Spor Radyo
