= Andıç scandal =

1998 scandal in the Republic of Turkey

The Andiç scandal is the leaking of information to incriminate prominent journalists of an alleged cooperation with the Kurdistan Workers Party (PKK). The "Andıç" document was prepared by the Turkish Generals Çevik Bir and Erol Özkasnak. The document falsely claimed to include statements by Şemdin Sakık, one of the members of the Kurdistan Workers' Party (PKK), and caught in 1998 by the authorities. These statements were published in Hürriyet and Sabah newspapers for two days on April 25, 1998. With the publication of the confessions said to belong to Sakık, the journalists mentioned in the confessions were dismissed from their jobs and there was an assassination attempt on Akın Birdal, who survived with serious injuries. When he was later brought to court, Sakık declared that he did not make such a statement. In October 2000, Nazlı Ilıcak delivered a document to journalists showing that all this was part of a psychological warfare tactic prepared by the General Staff's intelligence, and ten days after the publication of the document, the General Staff acknowledged the existence of the document called "andiç".

== Implementation ==
According to the false document sent by Çevik Bir and Erol Özkasnak, Sakık's testimony claimed that some journalists and non-governmental organizations "supported the PKK in exchange for money". Some media bosses, especially Sabah newspaper owner Dinç Bilgin, dismissed the aforementioned journalists. Among these journalists were journalists such as Cengiz Çandar, Ahmet Altan, Mehmet Altan, Mehmet Barlas, Mehmet Ali Birand, who did not comply with the official policy of the state in the Kurdish question. While the writings of Cengiz Çandar were stopped; Mehmet Ali Birand was kicked out of Sabah and the broadcast of the 32nd Day program on Show TV was suspended. There was also an assassination attempt on Akın Birdal, who was mentioned in the document. Birdal survived the assassination with serious injuries. Although it was assumed that the document was a memorandum of the General Staff, no statement was received from any commander about the incident. General Yaşar Büyükanıt, who became the 2nd chief of the General Staff of Turkey at the time, announced that the document was found to be fake 11 years after the incident, and made a statement on the 32nd Day program, "Yes, it was a mistake..." upon Mehmet Ali Birand's request.

During the 28 February trial, Çevik Bir claimed that Şemdin Sakık's statements were correct and that he had received his opinion on the rejection of other pages because he had only signed the last page of the transcript. Erdal Şenel, the General Staff Legal Counselor at the time, stated that the statements were correct and that this situation was used against the Turkish Armed Forces as the statements were not duly taken.
