= A Haber =

Turkish TV channel

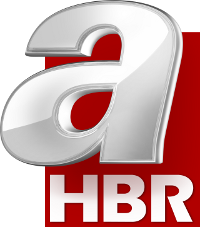
- Country: Turkey
- Broadcast area: Turkey, Worldwide (Online YouTube)
- Affiliates: A2
- Headquarters: Kemerburgaz, Eyüp, Göktürk, Istanbul

Programming
- Language: Turkish
- Picture format: 576i (16:9 SDTV); 1080i (HDTV)

Ownership
- Owner: Kalyon Group (Turkuvaz Media Group)
- Sister channels: ATV

History
- Launched: 25 April 2011

Links
- Website: www.ahaber.com.tr

A Haber is a worldwide news channel in Turkey. It was founded by Çalık Holding in 2011. Like the Turkey-wide ATV channel, A Haber belongs to Turkey's second-largest media group, Turkuvaz-AŞ. This in turn belongs to the Çalık Holding of Ahmet Çalık, who founded the station in 2011.

== History ==
On April 24, 2011, it started test broadcasting and on April 25, 2011, it started normal broadcasting. In addition to broadcasting news, it also broadcasts some football matches. It owns the broadcast rights to Copa America 2011 and broadcast all matches in HD quality. It also broadcast the 2011 Italian Super Cup Final in HD quality. It also broadcast some of the Turkey Cup 2011-2012 season matches live in HD.

== Criticism ==
A Haber is widely considered a very pro-government channel, according to BBC watchlist; Turkish pro-government media, labels protesters as immoral, violent, and labels peaceful protests as provoker groups, the channel has drawn critics for its non-existent coverage of opposition voices and silencing opposition cases in media.

== Anchors ==
- Banu El
- Cansın Helvacı
- Merve Türkay
- Salih Nayman
- Pelin Başalma Şanlı
