= Bekir Coşkun =

Turkish journalist, writer and columnist (1945–2020)

- Born: 1945; Şanlıurfa, Turkey
- Died: 18 Oktober 2020; Ankara, Turkey
- Education: Ankara Başkent University
- Occupations: Journalist, writer
- Writing career
- Years active: 1978-2020

Bekir Coşkun (1945 – 18 October 2020) was a Turkish journalist, writer and columnist for leading Turkish daily, Cumhuriyet. He was a good friend of Emin Çölaşan, with whom he had worked in the newspaper Hürriyet before they were controversially sacked by the paper's editor-in-chief, Ertuğrul Özkök. As staunch secularists, both were critical of the Justice and Development Party.

== Personal life ==
Bekir Coşkun was born in the Turkmen village of Tülmen in Şanlıurfa in the southeastern Anatolia region of the country. He graduated from Ankara Başkent University (Yüksek Gazetecilik Okulu) in 1974.

== Career ==
Coşkun joined the Günaydın newspaper in 1978. He joined Sabah in 1987 and moved to Hurriyet in 1993.

In an article written some weeks before the July 2007 General Elections, he described AK Party supporters as "men who scratch their belly" (Turkish: göbeğini kaşıyan adamlar). After Abdullah Gül's victory in the presidential elections of 2007, Coşkun stated, "he will not be my President", upon which the Prime Minister Erdoğan retorted by saying "he should abdicate his citizenship and leave the country if he doesn't consider [Gul] as his President". This led to an outcry among supporters of secularism in the country that people who didn't share AK Party's ideology would no longer be welcome in the country.

In 2007, after Emin Çölaşan left Hürriyet, for a while he considered leaving as well. In the meantime, rival newspaper and staunchly secularist Cumhuriyet offered him a position as one of their columnists. The absence of Coşkun's columns for a period of two weeks in August 2007 was attributed by some to an imminent switch. During this time, Aydın Doğan, the owner of the most powerful media conglomerate in Turkey (Doğan Media Group, which owned Hürriyet) convinced Cumhuriyet representatives to retract their offer.

He resigned from Hurriyet in 2009, moving to Habertürk shortly after, an episode he described in his book Başın Öne Eğilmesin ("Don’t bow your head"). He left Habertürk a year later in controversial circumstances, moving to Cumhuriyet in November 2010. The opposition CHP party claimed that Coşkun had been dismissed from Habertürk as a favour to the AKP, in order to benefit Habertürk's parent company, Ciner Group, which was bidding on privatization deals.

In 2012 Coşkun wrote a column for Cumhuriyet presenting "an imaginary dialogue between a wolf and a tamed dog called “Pasha” – a popular dog name and the Ottoman-era word for general. The chubby Pasha boasts about his comfortable life in the hut, but says that one must accept to wear a leash and obey their owner in return for the bones and cushions." The column was condemned by Prime Minister Recep Tayyip Erdoğan, who urged the army to sue; the Army General Staff filed a complaint, leading to prosecutors investigating.

Coşkun, agreed with Cumhuriyet newspaper between 2010–2013, then he wrote his articles in Sözcü on 14 March 2014.

Besides political commentary and satire, Coşkun was also known for his opinion columns advocating for animal rights and environmental activism. His weekend column usually focusing on these public issues was entitled "Letters to Pako," a reference to his beloved dog.

Bekir Coşkun, interrupted his articles due to cancer treatment in October 2017, has been meeting with his readers from his column in Sözcü newspaper since then, as long as his health allowed him.

Bekir Coşkun, who had been treated for lung cancer in his last years, died on 18 October 2020 in Ankara City Hospital.

== Books ==
- Başın Öne Eğilmesin (2011) ISBN 9789752203679
- Ben Pako (2005)
- Pako'ya Mektuplar (2000)
- Avukatımı İstiyorum... (1998)
- Dövlet

== See also ==
- Media of Turkey
- Secularism in Turkey
