= Hasuni Caves =

Archaeological site in Turkey

- Location within Turkey
- 38°08′12″N 41°05′25″E
- Location: Silvan, Diyarbakır Province, Turkey

The Hasuni Caves are a series of ancient caves in Diyarbakır Province, Turkey. They were inhabited from prehistoric times until the Middle Ages.

== Description ==
The caves are located near the village of Bahçeköy, in the Silvan district of Diyarbakir Province. The caves have been inhabited from the Mesolithic period to the early years of Christianity.

In 2019, two ancient epitaphs in Syriac-Aramaic script were found next to the caves. According to Syriac Press, "The inscriptions are in fact epitaphs on a gravestone of a priest called Monoha who was buried there". Dicle University's İrfan Yıldız, who was in charge investigating the inscriptions told Daily Sabah that the inscription "records that a priest called Monoha is buried here and that everyone who reads the inscription should pray for him”.

== Recent history ==
Since 2013 the caves have been listed as a potential tourism project for development within Diyarbakir Province.

The Diyarbakir tourism board currently promotes the area as a location for hiking and paragliding. According to HaberTurk, the Diyarbakır Chamber of Commerce and Industry (DTSO) has started to promote the area as a destination for tourism. DTSO Vice President Ercan Tayınlamak told HaberTurk that "The Hasuni Caves, located on the foothills of the Albat Mountain on the Malabadi highway in Silvan district, are located on one of the most dominant hills of the district. Remains belonging to the 13th century (AD) were found. It offers a full visual feast with the water tanks, bath, rock stairs, stone pavement paths, rock church and mini amphitheater next to the church."

Tayınlamak also said that the DTSO has applied to UNESCO for World Heritage Status for the caves, which include "the Hasuni Kaya Church, which is thought to have been used from the early periods of Christianity until the 13th century, and it is noteworthy that there is a mini amphitheater and water tanks next to the church consisting of many rooms. While the roof part of the bath was demolished, the exact construction date of this bathhouse, which was built with cut stones, is unknown. The bath and its surroundings became a haunt of treasure hunters before restoration and conservation work."

In February 2021, the DTSO organised a music concert in the caves. According to MedyaNews, "Klams (Kurdish folk songs) produced from the dengbej tradition were performed with santurs, violins and tambourines." DTSO's Deputy Chairman Ercan Avşar said that the concerts were intended to bring awareness and attention to the cultural heritage of Diyarbakir.
