= Uluç =

Uluc is both a given name and a surname. Notable people with the name include:

- Uluç Bayraktar (born 1974), Turkish director
- Doğan Uluç (1935–2022), Turkish American journalist
- Hıncal Uluç (1939–2022), Turkish journalist
