= Fotomaç =

Turkish daily sports newspaper

- (Turkish: Türkiye'nin en çok satan spor gazetesi, lit. 'The most selling sports newspaper of Turkey')
- Owner(s): Turkuvaz Media Group (subsidiary of Kalyon Group)
- Founder: Dinç Bilgin
- Editor-in-chief: Bülent Can, Mecit Coşkun (both as of 2020)
- Editor: Cenk Atılgan (as of 2020)
- News editor: Yüksel Gülsoy (as of 2020)
- Founded: 1991
- Language: Turkish
- Headquarters: Kemerburgaz, Eyüp, Göktürk, Istanbul
- City: Istanbul
- Country: Turkey
- Circulation: 48,333 (2020)
- Website: www.fotomac.com.tr

Fotomaç is a Turkish sports daily-published and online sports newspaper.

== History ==
Fotomaç was founded by Turkish media congolmorate Dinç Bilgin in 1991. The newspaper was merged with another newspaper owned by Bilgin, and renamed as Pas-Fotomaç before being sold to Ciner Holding, in 2003. The newspaper was acquired by Çalık Holding within a package of assets active in media industry, amounting US$ 1.1 billion, in scope of a public tender placed by Savings Deposit Insurance Fund of Turkey in 2007.
