= Milat (newspaper) =

Turkish daily newspaper

- Type: Daily newspaper
- Owner: Ali Adakoglu
- Founded: 20 October 2011
- Political alignment: Pro-HAS Party, Islamism
- Language: Turkish
- Headquarters: Kemerburgaz, Eyüp, Göktürk, Istanbul, Turkey
- Website: www.milatgazetesi.com

Milat is a national daily newspaper published in Turkey. Its first issue appeared on October 20, 2011.

With a daily circulation of around fifty thousand, Milat was the 24th best-selling newspaper in Turkey as of October 2014. It was then 12th in the league table of newspapers ranked by government advertising revenue, with an income of 959,272 TL in the first four months of 2014.

Founded under the leadership of people who left the Milli Gazete, Milat had an editorial stance that was sympathetic to the HAS Party in its early years. However, after the HAS Party joined the AK Party in 2012, it took a pro-AK Party line.
