= Gülay Göktürk =

Gülay Göktürk (born 1949, Istanbul), is a Turkish journalist, author, and politician. She has written columns for various newspapers in Turkey. She is among the founding members of the DEVA Party.

== Career ==
Göktürk has written for publications such as Yeni Yüzyıl and Akşam, and is the author of the book Mürteci Yazılar. In 2014, she left the Bugün newspaper and began writing for the Akşam newspaper. In 2016, after writing an article criticizing the presidential system, she was dismissed from the Akşam newspaper. She entered politics in 2020 and was among the founders of the DEVA Party.

== Views and legal proceedings ==
In 2001, Göktürk was acquitted of charges of publicly insulting and denigrating the National Intelligence Organization (MİT) over articles she had written about it. The court ruled that the articles fell within the scope of criticism and freedom of expression.
