= Derya Sazak =

Turkish journalist (born 1956)

- Born: 1956 (age 69–70); Ankara, Turkey
- Education: Gazi University
- Occupation: Journalist

Derya Sazak (born 1956) is a Turkish journalist and writer. He has worked for various leading newspapers.

== Biography ==
Sazak was born in Ankara in 1956. He is a graduate of Gazi University where he received a degree in journalism. Following his graduation he started his career in the newspaper Yeni Ulus in 1978. Then he joined Anka News Agency. Next he involved in the establishment of the daily newspaper Güneş. In 1983 he became a regular contributor of Milliyet of which he later became the editor-in-chief. His interview with Saddam Hussein in Baghdad was awarded as the best journalistic work in 1991. He served as the editor-in-chief of Milliyet until 30 July 2013 when Fikret Bila replaced him in the post. The reason for this replacement was the publication of the details of a meeting between Abdullah Öcalan and the Kurdish delegation which had been held on 28 February 2013. In the same purge two leading Milliyet contributors, Hasan Cemal and Can Dündar, were also fired.

In July 2014 he was named as the editor-in-chief of the Yurt newspaper. He was removed from the post in April 2015 because of the Turkish Government's censorship. He started a newspaper, Karşı, and is its editor in chief.
