= Çetin Özek =

Turkish university professor, jurist, author and journalist

- Born: 1934; Çorum, Turkey
- Died: 16 July 2008 (aged 73–74); Istanbul, Turkey
- Education: Law
- Alma mater: Istanbul University; University of Rome
- Occupations: University professor, jurist, author, journalist
- Children: Ayşe Özek Karasu - Zeynep Özek

Çetin Özek (1934 in Çorum, Turkey – 16 July 2008 in Istanbul) was a prominent Turkish university professor of criminal law, jurist, author and journalist.

Çetin Özek graduated from Istanbul's respected Pertevniyal High School in 1952 and from Istanbul University Law School in 1956. He was an instructor in criminal law at the same university for five years before receiving his doctorate in 1961, with a thesis titled about secularism in Turkey, a subject on which he was going to be known to feel strongly during his entire life.

Between 1962 and 1964, he attended the "Scuola di Perfezionamento di Diritto Penale" at the University of Rome through an Italian state scholarship. Back to Istanbul University, he became a lecturer in 1968, and spent 1969 to 1970 in England for further studies.

Current politics became a decisive factor in his career when he was dismissed from Istanbul University's academic staff following the 1971 "Coup by Memorandum" in Turkey. He could later annul the dismissal through a decision of the Turkish Council of State (Turkish: Danıştay) and, once back to university, he became a professor in 1978.

In 1983, in conflict with Turkey's newly founded "Council of Higher Education" (YÖK), Özek demissioned from his position at the university, and pursued a career focused on journalism and on legal counselling. He worked for the newspapers Hürriyet, Milliyet and Günaydın, both as columnist and as consultant. He returned to the university to demission again in 1999, this time in conflict with the rector. In the meantime, he pursued his primary profession of lawyer, in the frame of which he sometimes assumed cases, which acquired notoriety and had repercussions. He was also deeply involved in politics, making a name as a staunch supporter of Republican values and a strong critic of rising Islamist or Islamic-tainted movements.

Özek retired from his university career in 2002, although he remained active as a writer. In addition to a dozen books he wrote on matters such as criminal law, freedom of the press and secularism, a festschrift to his honor was published by prominent jurists from Galatasaray University in 2004.

Çetin Özek died on 16 July 2008 at the age of 74 in Istanbul after a long lasting illness. Following a religious funeral at Teşvikiye Mosque, he was laid to rest at the Kozlu Cemetery. He is survived by his daughters Ayşe Özek Karasu, manager of foreign news at Hürriyetand Zeynep Özek, tv producer.
