= Ünsal =

Ünsal is a Turkish surname. Notable people with the surname include:

- Begünhan Elif Ünsal (born 1993), Turkish female archer
- Berk İsmail Ünsal (born 1994), Turkish footballer
- Didem Ünsal (born 1966), Turkish journalist, television presenter and author
- Hakan Ünsal (born 1973), Turkish footballer
- Seyit Cem Unsal (born 1975), Turkish footballer
- Tuba Ünsal (born 1981), Turkish actress
