= Teyit.org =

- Website type: Fact checking
- Available in: Turkish
- Country of origin: Türkiye
- Founder: Mehmet Atakan Foça
- Website: teyit.org

Teyit.org is a Turkey-based Turkish verification platform that analyzes the accuracy of dubious content published on the Internet, basing it on open sources.

It was founded in 2016 by Mehmet Atakan Foça who works as a journalist. The website continues its activities under the two corporate structures: Teyit Media Research Association (conducts research on media and social media) and Dubium (carries technology and education development studies)

Teyit.org adopted the principles of the International Fact-Checking Network in 2017.

Teyit.org started a fact-checking program with Facebook in May 2018, aiming to prevent the spread of fake news. In 2020, this cooperation was expanded to include news written in Azerbaijani.

In 2021, Sözcü claimed that teyit.org misjudged their news on Facebook. The website is also criticized by Yeni Akit and Takvim newspapers.
