= Habertürk =

Former Turkish newspaper

- Type: Daily newspaper
- Format: Berliner
- Owner: Ciner Media Group
- Editor: Gülin Çelikler
- Founded: 1 March 2009; 16 years ago
- Ceased publication: 5 July 2018; 7 years ago
- Political alignment: Nationalism; Conservatism; Right-wing
- Language: Turkish
- Headquarters: Taksim, Beyoğlu
- City: İstanbul
- Country: Turkey
- Circulation: ▲180,819
- Website: www.haberturk.com

Habertürk (HT; lit. 'News Turkish') was a high-circulation Turkish newspaper. It was established on 1 March 2009 by Ciner Media Group, drawing on the brand of Ciner's Habertürk TV. It ceased publication on 5 July 2018.

The newspaper sold 360,000 copies on its first day of publication. At 10 a.m. local time, the first issue was sold out. The next day's circulation totalled 202,000. On that day, the newspaper's circulation ranked fifth, following the dailies Hürriyet (448,296), Sabah (420,148), Milliyet (204,477), and Vatan (204,154). On its first publishing anniversary in 2010, the newspaper sold 380,000 copies, breaking its own record.

Unlike all other newspapers in Turkey, Habertürk was the first daily to print in Berliner format in 350 mm × 500 mm (14 in × 20 in), differing slightly from the standard Berliner.

== Supplements ==
Habertürk was published on weekdays with supplements including HT ekonomi (economy), HT spor (sport), HT magazin+bulmaca (magazin plus crossword), and HT İstanbul/Ankara/İzmir (regionals). On weekends, HT Cumartesi (Saturday) and HT Pazar (Sunday) supplements were included. On Sundays, HT Kariyer (human resources) and HT Tarih (history) supplements were added at no extra charge.

== Columnists ==
There were 22 columnists at the main newspaper. Additionally, 19 columnists wrote for HT spor, eleven for HT magazin, twelve for HT ekonomi, and four more for the regional and weekend supplements. The total staff numbered 68.
