= Hıncal Uluç =

Turkish journalist and writer (1939–2022)

- Born: 1 November 1939; Kilis, Turkey
- Died: 20 November 2022 (aged 83); Istanbul, Turkey
- Resting place: Zincirlikuyu Cemetery
- Occupations: Journalist, writer
- Spouse: Holly Hartquist (m. 1977; div. 1983)

Hıncal Uluç (1 November 1939 – 20 November 2022) was a Turkish journalist and writer.

== Biography ==
In 1980, he moved to Istanbul after signing a contract with Gelişim Publishing's owner Ercan Arıklı for publishing a magazine. Later, in 1990 following Zafer Mutlu's suggestion he started writing for Sabah.

He was shot in the heel after an armed attack in 1994. In 2004, due to an article he wrote about Alaaddin Yüksel, the governor of Antalya, he was sentenced to one month in prison and paying ₺898 in 2008. He continued to write for Sabah and appeared as a commentator on the news program 90.

Following Defne Joy Foster's death, Uluç wrote an article about her neighbor's neglect under the title 'What kind of neighborhood is this?..' for which a lawsuit was filed against him and was eventually sentenced to paying compensation.

In 1985, he wrote the lyrics for the song "Bir Küçük Aşk Masalı" together with Sezen Aksu. The song was performed as a duet by Aksu and Özdemir Erdoğan.

On 20 November 2022, Uluç died in Istanbul. On 22 November he was interred at Zincirlikuyu Cemetery.

== Programs ==
- Aileler Yarışıyor (1975 - TRT)
- Yaşamdan Dakikalar (Formerly: TV8, ATV Later: Sky Türk)
- Tele Pazar (Kanal 1)
- Kırmızı Çizgi (2010 - NTV Sport)
- 90 Dakika (NTV)
- Yalanlar ve Ben - Ortaklaşan Bir Sevgi (new program)
