= Didem Ünsal =

Turkish journalist

- Born: 11 April 1966 (age 59); Ankara, Turkey
- Education: Gazi University
- Occupations: Journalist, author, producer

Didem Ünsal (born 11 April 1966) is a Turkish journalist, television presenter, and author. She is specializes in health issues.

== Early life and education ==
She was born in Ankara, Turkey on 11 April 1966. In 1987, she graduated from the Department of Radio and Television of the Faculty of Communication at Gazi University in Ankara.

== Career ==
Right after her graduation in 1987, she started working in the newspaper Ulus in Ankara. From 1989 on, she continued her journalism career in Istanbul, where she worked for the newspapers Sabah, Yeni Yüzyıl, Milliyet, and Hürriyet, as well as for the magazine Artı Haber, the broadcaster Bayrak Radio and Television Corporation (BRT) of Northern Cyprus and as a health editor at the Medical Channel. She is specialized in health issues.

== Works ==
- Tulunay, Cankat (2006). Ünsal, Didem (ed.). 99 Sayfada Migren ve Baş Ağrısı (in Turkish). Istanbul: Türkiye İş Bankası Kültür Yayınları. ISBN 978-975-458-748-7.
- Gülekli, Bülent (2006). Ünsal, Didem (ed.). 99 Sayfada Tüp bebek (in Turkish). Istanbul: Türkiye İş Bankası Kültür Yayınları. ISBN 978-975-458-837-8.
- Akdeniz, Fisun (2006). Ünsal, Didem (ed.). 99 Sayfada Depresyon (in Turkish). Istanbul: Türkiye İş Bankası Kültür Yayınları. ISBN 978-975-458-838-5.
- Yazgan, Yankı (2006). Ünsal, Didem (ed.). 99 Sayfada Bebeklikten Çocukluğa (in Turkish). Istanbul: Türkiye İş Bankası Kültür Yayınları. ISBN 978-975-458-823-1.
- Yazgan, Yankı (2018). Ünsal, Didem (ed.). 99 Sayfada Ergenlikten Gençliğe (in Turkish). Istanbul: Türkiye İş Bankası Kültür Yayınları. ISBN 978-994-488-079-4.
