= Orhan Boran =

Turkish actor and television personality

- Orhan Boran in his jubilee in 2005 with Sezen Aksu
- Born: 30 June 1928; Istanbul, Turkey
- Died: 26 May 2012 (aged 83); Istanbul, Turkey
- Resting place: Zincirlikuyu Cemetery
- Education: Galatasaray High School
- Occupations: Comedian, radio and TV host and actor
- Years active: 1945–2005
- Spouse: Güler Boran

Orhan Boran (30 June 1928 – 26 May 2012) was a Turkish radio and TV host and actor. He was also widely known for his laudable usage of the Turkish language.

== Early life ==
Boran was born in Istanbul, Turkey in 1928 as the son of Hikmet Boran, a graduate of the medical college. At the age of ten, Orhan enrolled at the famed Galatasaray High School, where he was a boarder even on weekends. His first stage experience came when he was still at Galatasaray as he took part in school drama productions. The plays were directed by Necdet Mahfi Ayral, a fine actor with the Municipal Theaters, and Boran had the leading role.

== Career ==
Boran's stage career was launched when he graduated from high school in 1946. A year after joining the ranks of the Municipal Theaters, Boran found the opportunity to go to Paris and work as an intern with a theater known as Les Mathurins. He came back to Turkey in 1949, feeling that the theater was not for him. That same year, when Radio Istanbul went on the air, he ‘found his calling,’ as he puts it. The programs he did then, at the age of 21, gave him instant celebrity. And it was at this time that he began doing one-man stints in night clubs, laying the foundations for the Stand-up Banter that has become synonymous with the name Orhan Boran.

In 1956, by taking first place in an examination given by the British Consulate in Istanbul, Orhan Boran found himself in London, where he worked for the Turkish service of the BBC. He was also London correspondent for the Turkish daily news Dunya. His success as a correspondent was to bring him within the sphere of Hürriyet and Milliyet, leading Turkish newspapers, and start his 25 years in print.

On returning to Turkey in 1960 he quickly went back into radio. It was also at this time that the 'Stand-up Banter' performances began, forerunners of today's stand-up comedy in modern Turkey. Boran's stories were mostly based on his imaginary family and the conversations between the family members.

At a time when he hosted nearly all the radio quiz programs in Turkey, he also created a famous fictitious character named Yuki (a rabbit-like character voiced by Boran himself) for a radio show during the 1960s. Boran created other characters besides Yuki, entertaining listeners for years and years with the stories of the derelict brother-in-law, the sister-in-law doomed to be an old maid, and many more. In the late 1990s, an animation version of Yuki based on scripts taken from the early radio programs was produced as a series of for television, however, because of the marketing problems, it failed to hit the screen.

Boran ended his long stage career in 1981 with a show called A Musical Belly-Laugh, written by himself and featuring a number of artists. He then started to host his own television programs: Panel, Hello Friends (Merhaba Arkadaşlar), Sunday Nights With Orhan Boran (Orhan Boran ile Pazar Geceleri), and Moments With Orhan Boran (Orhan Boran'lı Dakikalar).

Having won numerous awards from the Ministry of Culture and the Turkish Language Association, Boran in 1992 joined the faculty of the Marmara University School of Communications in order to share what he had learned with the younger generation who have always meant so much to him. But although he loved being an academic, his heavy work schedule forced him to resign from this post.

After 59 years, Boran retired from show business on 10 June 2005.

== Death ==
Orhan Boran died on 26 May 2012 at the age of 83. He had been suffering from bone marrow disease for two years.

He was laid to rest at the Zincirlikuyu Cemetery following the religious funeral ceremony held in Galippaşa Mosque in Erenköy, Kadıköy.
