= ATV (Turkish TV channel) =

Turkish television network

- Logo used since 2010
- Country: Turkey
- Broadcast area: National
- Headquarters: Kemerburgaz, Eyüp, Göktürk, Istanbul, Turkey

Programming
- Language: Turkish
- Picture format: 1080i HDTV (downscaled to 16:9 576i for the SDTV feed)

Ownership
- Owner: Kalyon Group (Turkuvaz Media Group)
- Key people: Sabah Group (founding)
- Sister channels: A2, A Haber, A Spor

History
- Launched: 12 July 1993

Links
- Website: www.atv.com.tr

ATV (stylized as atv) is a Turkish free-to-air television network owned by Turkuvaz Media Group. As of August 2013, ATV was Turkey's most popular channel with a market share of 22%.

== History ==
Founded by Dinç Bilgin of Sabah Group, the channel launched on 12 July 1993. The channel changed its ownership to Ciner Media Group in 2002. The Savings Deposit Insurance Fund of Turkey (TMSF) seized the channel in 2007. ATV was acquired by the Çalık Holding's Turkuvaz Media Group at US$1.1 billion on 22 April 2008. It was rumored that the Çalık Holding wanted to sell the channel, and the News Corp. of Rupert Murdoch showed interest in 2012. Following the permission of the Turkish Competition Authority, the Kalyon Group's Zirve Holding, which was founded by Ömer Faruk Kalyoncu with a capital of ₺380 million (US$192 million) on 23 August 2013, acquired various shares of Turkuvaz Group companies from Çalık Holding on 20 December 2013.

== Programming ==
Notable local productions in its early years included Süper Baba, İkinci Bahar, Çiçek Taksi, Tatlı Kaçıklar, Mahallenin Muhtarları, İlişkiler, Gurbetçiler, Sıcak Saatler, Baba Evi, Böyle mi Olacaktı and Affet Bizi Hocam.

=== TV series ===
The Glance, a consulting company for international television markets, which analyzes the consumption habits of TV viewers on a global scale, published in its annual report "One TV Year In The World 2021" that the television series of ATV, Bir Zamanlar Çukurova was broadcast in Iraq, North Macedonia, Uzbekistan, Georgia, Dominica, Lithuania Hercai in Dominica, Georgia, Iraq, Puerto Rico, Lithuania Sen Anlat Karadeniz in Lebanon, Dominica and Kırgın Çiçekler in North Macedonia. ATV also made it onto the list as one of the top 10 most watched content in 2021.

=== Dramas (serials) ===
- 2007–2009: Elveda Rumeli
- 2004–2009: Avrupa Yakası
- 2012: Son Yaz Balkanlar 1912
- 2012–2015: Karadayı
- 2018–2021: Beni Bırakma
- 2018–2022: Bir Zamanlar Çukurova
- 2019–2021: Hercai
- 2019-2025: Kuruluş: Osman
- 2021: Kardeşlerim
- 2021: Destan
- 2022: Yalnız Kurt
- 2022: Bir Küçük Gün Işığı
- 2022: Aldatmak
- 2022: Ben Bu Cihana Sığmazam
- 2023: Safir
- 2025: Kuruluş: Orhan
- 2026:Aşk ve Taht
- 2026: Altı Üstü İstanbul
- Yakında:Harmal

=== Cinema ===
- 1993: atv Yabancı Sinema Kuşağı

=== Game shows ===
- 2011: Kim Milyoner Olmak İster? (Oktay Kaynarca)
- 2021: Mutfak Bahane (Derya Taşbaşı)
- 2026: Var mısın? Yok musun? (Esra Erol)

=== Lifestyle ===
- 2008: Müge Anlı ile Tatlı Sert
- 2015: Esra Erol'da (transferred from FOX)

=== Religious programs ===
- 2011: Nihat Hatipoğlu Sorularınızı Cevaplıyor (Nihat Hatipoğlu) (transferred from Star TV)
- 2012: Nihat Hatipoğlu ile Dosta Doğru (Nihat Hatipoğlu) (transferred from Star TV)
- 2013: Nihat Hatipoğlu ile Kuran ve Sünnet (Nihat Hatipoğlu)

=== Magazine entertainment ===
- 2010: Dizi TV (Didem Uğurlu)

=== News programming ===
- 1993: atv Ana Haber (Cem Öğretir)
- 1993: Hafta Sonu atv Ana Haber (Nihan Günay)
- 2015: Gün Ortası (Deniz Türe) (transferred from Yeni Asır TV)
- 2016: Kahvaltı Haberleri (Nihan Günay)
- 2016: Son Durak (Melih Altınok)
- 2016: atv'de Hafta Sonu (İbrahim Sadri)

=== Sports ===
- 2011: Turkish Cup
- 2012: Turkish Super Cup
- 2020: Bundesliga (via A Spor only)
- 2026: Nations League

=== Children ===
- 2016: Minika Kuşağı
