= Nuray Mert =

Turkish columnist (born 1960)

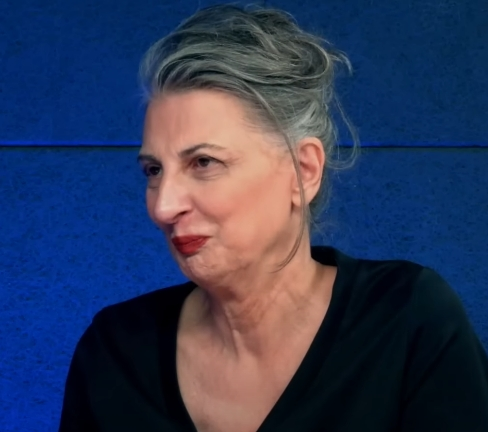
- Born: 1960 (age 65–66); Trabzon, Turkey
- Education: FMV Işık High School
- Alma mater: Boğaziçi University (BA, MA, PhD)
- Occupations: Professor; columnist; TV presenter

Nuray Mert (born 1960 in Trabzon, Turkey) is a Turkish columnist and political scientist. She is a columnist for Hürriyet Daily News. Mert is also a Bilderberg participant.

== Academic career ==
After graduating from Feyziye Mektepleri Vakfı Işık High School, she studied political science and history at Boğaziçi University, Istanbul, where she obtained the master's degree on a thesis entitled "Prens Sabahaddin and Terakki Magazine" (Turkish: Prens Sabahaddin ve Terakki Mecmuası), and the PhD on a thesis entitled "Secular Thought in the Early Republican Period" (Turkish: Erken Cumhuriyet Döneminde Laik Düşünce). She worked as a research assistant at Boğaziçi University, after which she became lecturer at the Department of Economics of Istanbul University.

In 2012–2013, she was an International Scholar in Residence at the Stanford Humanities Center.

== Journalism ==
She used to host a TV show, but this was dropped after Turkish Prime Minister Recep Tayyip Erdoğan publicly criticized her. She was also fired on February 19, 2012, from her job as a columnist for the daily newspaper Milliyet. Mert has said that she now fears for her personal safety. The Turkish Journalists' Association has denounced the attacks on Mert by Erdoğan.

In August 2017, Mert was fired from the newspaper Cumhuriyet after writing an article questioning the validity of evolution and another one in support of muftis performing marriages.
