= Burak Bekdil =

Turkish columnist (1966–2023)

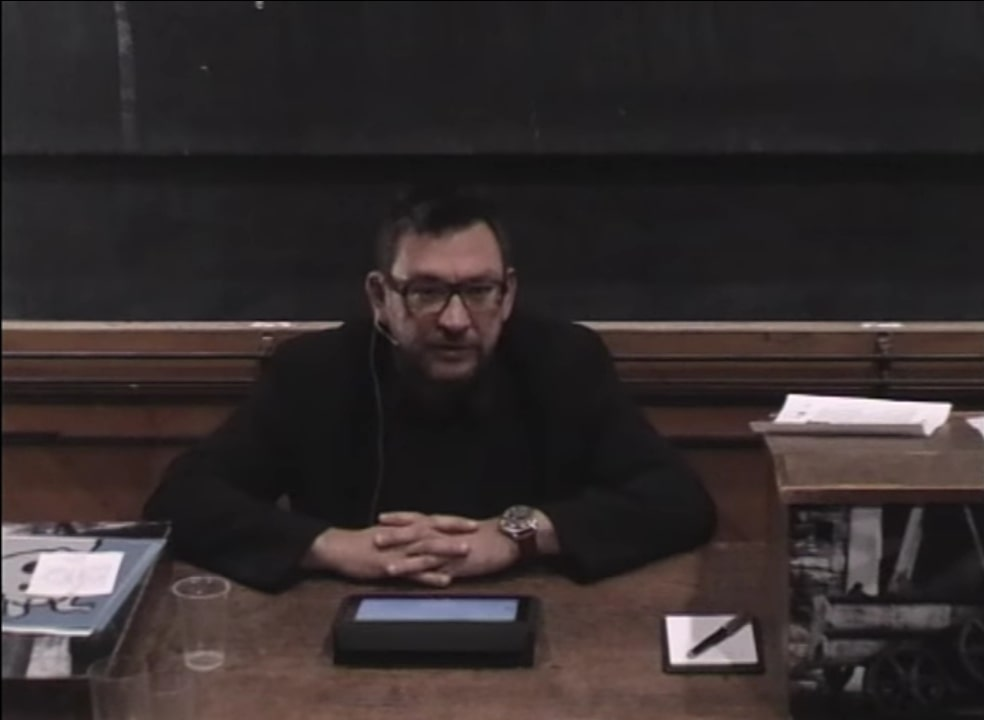
- Born: 1966; Ankara, Turkey
- Died: 21 October 2023 (aged 57); Istanbul, Turkey
- Occupation: Journalist

Burak Bekdil (1966 – 21 October 2023) was a Turkish columnist who wrote for the daily Hürriyet for 29 years. At the time of his death he was a Fellow at the Middle East Forum and had covered Turkey for the U.S. weekly Defense News since 1997. His articles were published in many international media outlets including The Wall Street Journal, The Economist, the BBC, The Guardian, Reuters, the Associated Press, Bloomberg, the Los Angeles Times, The New York Times, Haaretz, The Jerusalem Post, the Toronto Star, the Financial Times, Le Figaro, ABC, El País, Stern, Al-Arabiya, etc.

James Cuno, art historian and President of the J. Paul Getty Trust, describes Bekdil as "a frequent critic of Prime Minister Recep Tayyip Erdoğan". In 2002, he received an eighteen-month suspended sentence for "insulting the judiciary".

Bekdil died on 21 October 2023, at the age of 57.
