= Erman Şener =

Turkish film critic, screenwriter, author, columnist, TV host and producer (1942-2002)

- Born: August 9, 1942; Afyon, Turkey
- Died: March 29, 2002 (aged 59); Istanbul
- Education: Istanbul University
- Occupations: Film critic, screenwriter, author, columnist, TV host and producer
- Spouse: Emine
- Children: Erdem, Elf
- Writing career
- Years active: 1958-2002

Erman Şener (9 August 1942 in Afyon, Turkey – 29 March 2002 in Istanbul) was a Turkish film critic, screenwriter, author, columnist, TV host and producer.

== Background ==
Şener was born in Afyon, Turkey. After he graduated from primary school his parents moved to Ankara. Just after a year in Ankara, Şener moved to Istanbul where he spend the rest of his life. He graduated from Istanbul University Economical and Commercial Sciences Institute and earned a master's degree in economics.

== Career ==
When he was 16, he professionally started to write about cinema. He wrote for numerous leading magazines and newspapers like Ses, Yeni Sinema, Hayat Tarih, Hey, Hurriyet and Milliyet (for over 20 years). He worked as an instructor in Anatolian University (Cinema & TV) and Istanbul University (Graduate School of Journalism). Produced and hosted his own talk show Carsamba Sineması (Wednesday Cinema) on TRT 2 for more than 10 years. His articles concerning cinema and TV and their recent history were published in various Turkish and international newspapers and magazines. He was on the jury of some major international movie festivals.

Erman Şener died on March 29, 2002, at his house in Istanbul, after suffering from cirrhosis, at the age of 59. He is survived by his wife Emine and their two children Erdem and Elf.

== Works ==
- Yeşilçam ve Türk Sineması ("Yeşilçam and Turkish cinema"),
- Kurtuluş Savaşı ve Sinemamız ("Turkish War of Independence and our Cinema")
- Festivaller ("Festivals"),
- Sinema Seyircisinin El Kitabı ("Movie watcher's handbook")
- Televizyon ve Video ("Television and Video", 1984)
- Sinema Sanatçıları Sözlüğü ("Cinema Artists' Dictionary")
- Sinemaya Giriş ("Access to Cinema")
- Televizyona Giriş ("Access to Television")
- Hayatımız Buruşuk ("Our lives are wrinkled", humor, 1990)
- Demokratik Köfteler ("Democratic Meatballs", humor)
