= Turkuvaz Media Group =

Turkish media company

- Type: Private
- Industry: Mass media
- Headquarters: Istanbul, Turkey
- Key people: Serhat Albayrak (CEO)
- Products: Newspapers, Magazines, Television, Radio, Digital media, Book retail
- Parent: Kalyon Group
- Website: www.turkuvazyayin.com.tr

Turkuvaz Media Group (Note: Also known Sabah-ATV Group) is a Turkish company operating in the media sector. The company's CEO is Dr Serhat Albayrak, son of Sadık Albayrak and brother of former Treasury and Finance Minister, Berat Albayrak, who is also President Recep Tayyip Erdoğan's son-in-law. The company is also known as the owner of Sabah-ATV Group.

Turkuvaz Media Group, which encompasses print, broadcast, audio and digital media, acquired D&R, Turkey's largest book and hobby store, from Doğan Holding in 2018 for 440 million lira.

Turkuvaz Printing, a subsidiary of Turkuvaz Media Group, is also known as one of Turkey's largest printing facilities.

== About the company ==
The main activities of Turkuvaz Media Group are radio and television broadcasting, newspaper/magazine publishing, newspaper/magazine printing and nationwide distribution of newspapers/magazines. At the same time, it continues and constantly develops its activities in retail, cargo transportation and bookselling sectors. Turkuvaz Media has a large-scale holding structure which serves all its departments, including Human Resources, Information Systems, Finance, Administrative Affairs, Corporate Communications, Legal, Audit, and Advertising Sales and Marketing. It has been announced as Turkey's largest media company.

== History ==
In 2008, the company was sold to Çalık Holding in Aşiyan, Yıldız, Beşiktaş, Istanbul. As of 2014, the company operates under Kalyon Group in Kemerburgaz, Eyüp, Göktürk, İstanbul. Turkuvaz Media Group acquired Turkey's largest book-hobby store D&R from Doğan Holding in 2018.

=== Public events ===
Emine Erdoğan, wife of Recep Tayyip Erdoğan, attended the Sustainable Century Summit and Award Ceremony organized by Inbusiness, the business magazine of Turkuvaz Media Group, at the Turkuvaz Media Center. Serhat Albayrak presented Emine Erdoğan with “The Balance of Nature” by artist Yasemin Aslan Bakiri, which was created by shaping waste glass at 1200 degrees Celsius.

== Turkish Cup and Super Cup broadcasting rights and prizes ==
Turkuvaz Media Group has held the broadcasting rights for Turkish Cup and Super Cup matches since the 2011–2012 season. It continues to broadcast these matches unencrypted today, airing them on its channels atv, a2, atv Europe, a Spor, and a Haber.

=== Awards ===
At the 2025 Crystal Marmara Awards ceremony organised by the Marmara University Business Club, considered one of Turkey's most prestigious awards, Turkuvaz Media won the award for “Company that Acquired the Most Unique and Innovative Talent of the Year”.

== List of brands and media outlets ==
Newspapers

- 2007–: Sabah (purchased from TMSF)2007–: Takvim (purchased from TMSF)
- 2007–: Yeni Asır (purchased from TMSF)
- 2007–: Fotomaç (purchased from TMSF)
- 2014–: Daily Sabah

Television

- 2007–: atv (purchased from TMSF)
- 2007–: atv Europe (purchased from TMSF)
- 2007–2014: Yeni Asır TV (purchased from TMSF)
- 2011–: a Haber
- 2011–2012: minika
- 2012–: minika Çocuk
- 2012–: minika Go
- 2014–: a Spor
- 2016–: a2
- 2017–: a News
- 2018–: a Para
- 2021–: VAV TV – Launched on 12 April 2021. It is a channel that brings religious topics to viewers.

a Para

It broadcasts on economics. It began test broadcasting in 1080i on 21 June 2017. Like a News, it only broadcasts in HD. It opened on 17 September 2018.

Magazines

- My Baby and Us
- China Today
- Esquire
- Forbes Turkey
- GQ Turkey (acquired from Doğuş Yayın Grubu)
- Harper's Bazaar
- HomeArt
- House Beautiful
- Lacivert
- Otohaber
- Money
- Sofra
- Şamdan Plus
- Vogue Turkey (acquired from Doğuş Yayın Grubu)

Radios

- 2007-2016: Romantic Radio (Purchased from TMSF. Transferred its frequency to A Spor Radio.)
- 2007-2009: Radio City (Purchased from TMSF. Transferred its frequency to Radio Turkuvaz.)
- 2009–present: Radio Turkuvaz
- 2014–present: a Haber Radio
- 2016–present: a Spor Radio
- 2016–present: Vav Radio – Broadcasts religious programmes, the Quran, and talk shows. Broadcasts on terrestrial frequencies in Istanbul 105.2, Ankara 101.3, Izmir 106.7, Bursa 100.2, Antalya 106.6, Adana 98.9, Mersin 88.1, Kars 105.0 and all cities in Turkey.
- 2016–present: Turkuvaz Romantic
- 2016–present: Turkuvaz Efsane
- 2017–present: a News Radio
- 2018–present: a Para Radio

Internet

- aktuel.com.tr
- atv.com.tr
- ahaber.com.tr
- anews.com.tr (Publication Date: 3 April 2017)
- aspor.com.tr (Year of Publication: 18 September 2014)
- fotomac.com.tr (Year of Publication: 2000)
- fikriyat.com (Year of Publication: 2017)
- dailysabah.com (Year of Publication: 2014)
- minikacocuk.com.tr (Year of Publication: 2011)
- minikago.com.tr (Year of Publication: 2011)
- mavimisket.com.tr
- sabah.com.tr
- takvim.com.tr (Year of Publication: 2004)
- yeniasir.com.tr
- 724dinle.com (Year of Publication: 2021)
- turkuvazradyolar.com
- teknokulis.com (Year of Publication: 2011)

Teknokulis: or teknokulis.com, launched on 26 January 2011, is a website that publishes Turkish technology content. Established under Turkuvaz Media, the site has the slogan ‘The Shortcut to Technology’. It primarily offers content consisting of technology news. The review section features reviews of electronic devices aimed at end consumers. Tips, files, videos, galleries, forums, and authors make up the site's other categories. It offers its readers exclusive content from major local and international technology events it participates in. The site's founder and Editor-in-Chief, Hasan Genç, was awarded the Yurtsan Atakan Award at the Media Awards ceremony organised by the Association of IT Journalists in 2015.
