= Müge Anlı =

Turkish television presenter and journalist

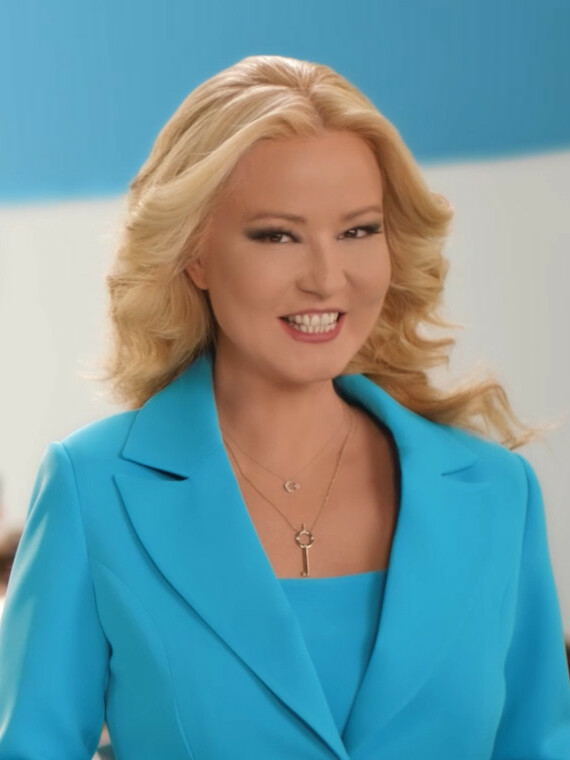
- Anlı in 2023
- Born: 19 December 1973 (age 52); Istanbul, Turkey
- Occupations: TV presenter; journalist; TV personality; producer
- Years active: 1993–present
- Notable work: Dobra Dobra; Müge Anlı ile Tatlı Sert
- Spouses: Burhan Akdağ (m. 1999; div. 2008) Şinasi Yüzbaşıoğlu (m. 2022)
- Children: 1

Müge Anlı (born 19 December 1973) is a Turkish television presenter and journalist.

After presenting the news magazine program Dobra Dobra, she started her own discussion program, Müge Anlı ile Tatlı Sert, on ATV. In the program, people who are looking for their lost relatives are welcomed, and issues such as unsolved murders and lost victims who cannot be found are discussed.

== Personal life ==
Between 1999 and 2008, she was married to journalist Burhan Akdağ. Together they have a daughter. In June 2022, Anlı married Istanbul Police Public Security Branch's manager Şinasi Yüzbaşıoğlu.

== Television programs ==
Television programs
Year	Title	Role		Notes
Year	Title	Producer	Presenter	Notes
2006–2008	Dobra Dobra		Yes	
2008–present	Müge Anlı ile Tatlı Sert	Yes	Yes	
2010–2011	Mektubunuz Var	Yes	Yes	
2019, 2025–present	Güven Bana		Yes	

== Awards ==
Year	Award	Category	Result
2016	43rd Golden Butterfly Awards	Best Female TV Presenter	Won
2018	45th Golden Butterfly Awards	Best Female TV Presenter	Won
2020	46th Golden Butterfly Awards	Best Female TV Presenter	Won
2021	47th Golden Butterfly Awards	Best Female TV Presenter	Won
2022	48th Golden Butterfly Awards	Best Female TV Presenter	Won
2023	49th Golden Butterfly Awards	Best Female TV Presenter	Won
2024	50th Golden Butterfly Awards	35th Year Special Achievement Award	Won
