= Ateş (newspaper) =

Defunct Turkish newspaper

- Type: Daily newspaper
- Founded: 7 December 1995
- Ceased publication: 15 February 1999
- Language: Turkish
- Headquarters: Istanbul, Turkey

Ateş (Turkish pronunciation: [ɑˈt̪eʃ], lit. 'Fire') was a Turkish daily newspaper. It was published from 7 December 1995 to 15 February 1999. It was acquired in August 1998 from Dinç Bilgin's Sabah group by Korkmaz Yiğit.
