= Habertürk TV =

- Country: Turkey
- Broadcast area: international
- Affiliates: Habertürk Radyo
- Headquarters: Istanbul, Turkey

Programming
- Language: Turkish

Ownership
- Owner: Ciner Media Group

History
- Launched: 2001; 25 years ago

Links
- Website: www.haberturk.com

Habertürk TV is a Turkish national TV channel established in 2001 by journalist Ufuk Güldemir. Since 2007, it has been owned by the Ciner Media Group. In 2009, Ciner created the Habertürk newspaper, drawing on Habertürk TV's brand.

In June 2013, Habertürk TV's relative lack of coverage of the 2013–14 protests in Turkey saw hundreds of protestors gather in front of its head office in Istanbul.

On 11 September 2025, the channel was seized by the state and placed under the control of the Savings Deposit Insurance Fund of Turkey as part of an investigation into fraud, tax evasion and money laundering into Can Holding.
