= Doğan Uluç =

Turkish American journalist and writer (1935–2022)

- Born: 1935; Istanbul, Turkey
- Died: August 11, 2022 (aged 86–87); New York City, US
- Resting place: Green-Wood Cemetery, Brooklyn
- Occupations: Journalist, writer
- Spouse: Carolyn Schuler-Uluç
- Children: Simavi Uluç; Alun Uluç; Şima Güven; Neclâ Uluç
- Relatives: Zeki Pasha (Great-Uncle); Ömer Uluç (Cousin)

Doğan Uluç (1935 – 11 August 2022) was a Turkish American journalist and writer.

After graduating from Istanbul University Faculty of Law, he started his career as a reporter at Tercüman newspaper in 1955. Then he joined Hürriyet and was appointed as the London correspondent of the newspaper in 1964. In 1970, he was sent to New York as the representative of the same newspaper to the United Nations and the United States Central Bureau. From that date until his death, Uluç continued to work as a journalist in the United States in the political, social and economic fields and published news, interviews and columns in Hürriyet newspaper and magazines. Uluç passed away in New York City in 2022 where he lived and he was interred at Green-Wood Cemetery in Brooklyn.

== Books ==
- Kupa Ası - Olaylar içinde olaylar (2009)

== Sources ==
- New York Times, February 17, 1991
- legacy.com
- United Nations obituary notice press.un.org
- Hurriyet newspaper funeral program
