= Nihat Hatipoğlu =

Turkish academician and theologian

Prof. Dr. Nihat Hatipoğlu
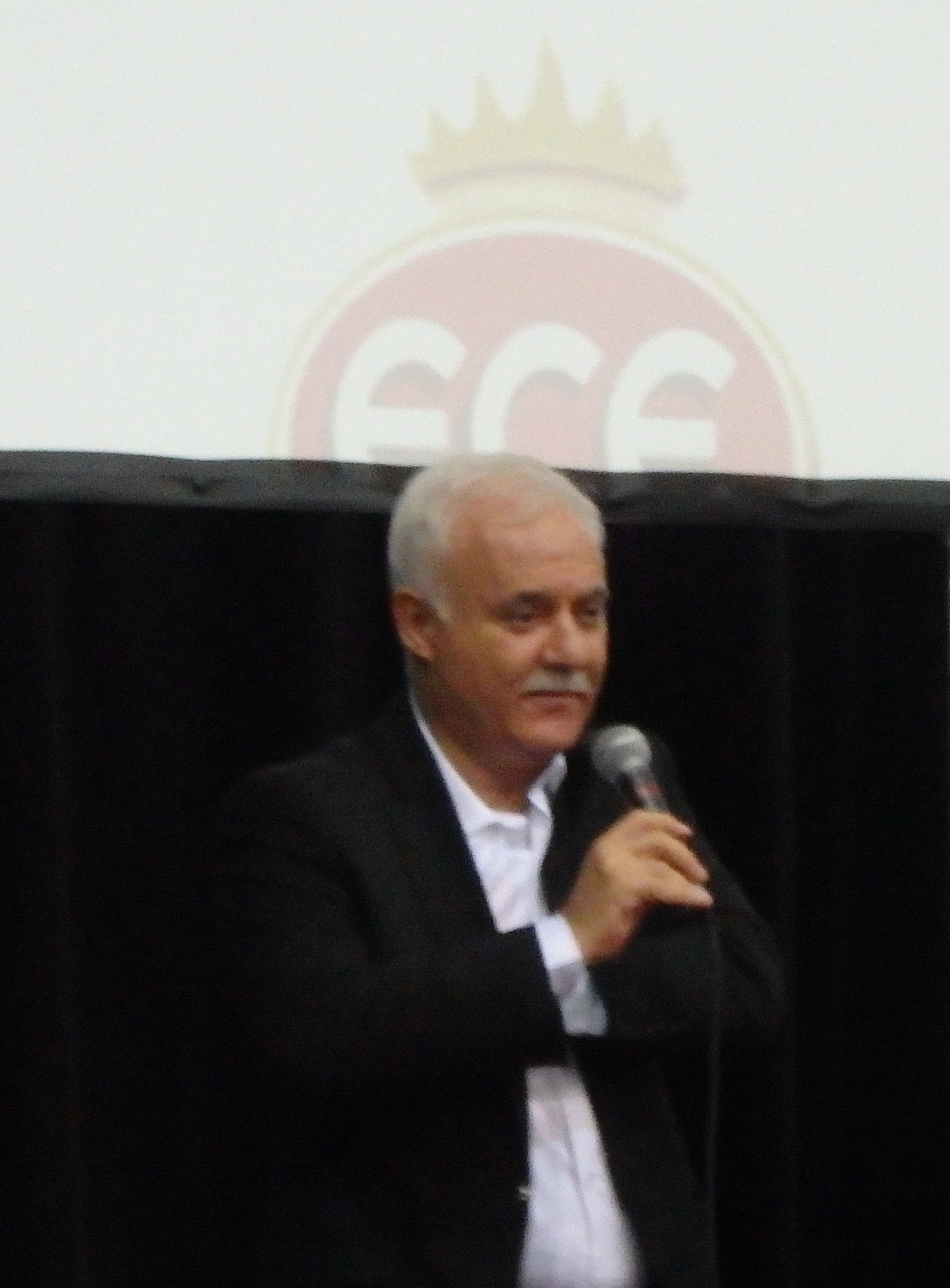
- Nihat Hatipoğlu, 2014

Personal life
- Born: 11 May 1955 (age 71) Diyarbakır, Turkey
- Parent: Haydar Hatipoğlu (father)
- Main interest(s): Fiqh, Tafsir, Hadith
- Education: Ankara University; Dicle University

Religious life
- Religion: Islam
- Denomination: Sunni
- Jurisprudence: Hanafi
- Creed: Maturidi
- Website: nihathatipoglu.com

Nihat Hatipoğlu (born 11 May 1955 in Diyarbakır, Turkey) is a Turkish academician and theologian.

== Biography ==
Nihat Hatipoğlu was born in Diyarbakır on 11 May 1955. He completed his primary education in Malatya and Kayseri. He studied in an Imam-Hatip High School and graduated from Ankara University.

== Criticism ==
It was claimed that Nihat Hatipoğlu was receiving ₺600,000 monthly for his program, which was broadcast on ATV during Ramadan in 2014, and lived in a villa with a pool. Hatipoğlu responded to the rumors by saying, "I have been living in the same house in Keçiören for 20 years. I have neither a villa, nor a pool, nor a pit in front of my house that can get filled with water during rainfall. The claim that I received ₺600 thousand per month from ATV is a lie."

In August 2014, Turkey's first atheism association Ateizm Derneği filed a criminal complaint with allegations of inciting hatred and hostility and marginalization against Hatipoğlu following his remarks on an ATV program, during which he said: "The greatest father to atheists is the devil, meaning that the devil is actually much cleaner than they are." Hatipoğlu stated in his defense that he had in fact "displayed an embracing attitude towards atheists". The prosecutor's office rejected the case on the grounds that the statements were not intended for individuals but for ideas.

In May 2019, Hatipoğlu made a 13-year-old Christian Armenian child a Muslim during the iftar program on ATV. Hatipoğlu claimed that he had the permission of the child's family for this, while the family's friends said that the children were supposed to go to an outdoor program to eat dinner. The incident sparked reactions and criticism about violating children's rights.

== Books authored ==
- İnsanlığın Geleceği ve İslam, 1988
- İslami Davetin İlkeleri, 1988
- Fitneler, 1997
- Ashapdan Bir Demet, 1997
- Bazı Hadislerin Günümüze Yansıması, 1997
- Ayetlere Farklı Bir Bakış, 1997
- Asr-ı Saadette Müşrik ve Münafık Liderler, 1999
- Kur'an-ı Kerim'in Anlaşılmasında Hadislerin Rolü, 1999
- Ebu Zür'a er-Razi ve Hadis İlmindeki Yeri, 2000
- Hz. Peygamberle İslam'ı Doğru Anlamak, 2006
- Saadet Asrından Damlalar, 2008
- Sevgi Dininden Yansımalar, 2009
- Dört Halife, 2010
- Gökteki Yıldızlar, 2010
- O'nu Nasıl Sevdiler, 2010
- Nihat Hatipoğlu'nun Kaleminden Günlük Dualar, 2010
- Barış Elçisinden Rahmet Dokunuşları, 2010
- Allah'ı Bildiğimi Sanırdım, 2011
- Rahmete Firar Etmek, 2011
- Büyüklerin Duaları, 2011
- Kur'an ve Sünnet Işığında Felaketler ve Deprem, 2011
- Hz. Peygamber ile Kur’an’ı Doğru Anlamak, 2015
