= Takvim =

Turkish newspaper

- Type: Daily newspaper
- Owner: Kalyon Group
- Publisher: Turkuvaz Media Group
- Founded: 27 December 1994
- Political alignment: Erdoğanism
- Language: Turkish
- City: Kemerburgaz, Eyüp, Göktürk, İstanbul
- Country: Turkey
- Circulation: 110,000 (May 2013)
- Website: www.takvim.com.tr

Takvim is a Turkish daily newspaper owned by Kalyon Group. The word "takvim" means calendar in Turkish.

== History ==
Founded by Dinç Bilgin in 1994, Takvim was acquired by Ahmet Çalık's Turkuvaz Media Group in 2008, as part of its $1.1bn purchase of the Sabah-ATV group.

On 18 June 2013 Takvim devoted its front page to a fake "interview" with CNN's Christiane Amanpour, in which Amanpour supposedly confesses that CNN's coverage of the 2013 protests in Turkey was motivated by "the express interest of destabilizing Turkey for international business interests". The paper included a small disclaimer in the story, saying "This interview is not real, but what you will read here is real."
