= Agani Murutsxi =

Newspaper in Laz language published in Turkey

- Format: Berliner
- Owner: İrfan Çağatay
- Founder: İrfan Çağatay
- Editor-in-chief: İrfan Çağatay
- Launched: 11 September 2013; 12 years ago
- City: Istanbul
- Country: Turkey
- Circulation: 1,000

Agani Murutsxi (Laz: Ağani Muruʒxi, lit. "New Star"; Turkish: Ağani Murutsxi) is a newspaper in the Laz language, launched on 11 September 2013, and published monthly in Istanbul, Turkey.

== History ==
In June 2013, a group of Laz people met in Istanbul, Turkey, and discussed publishing of a newspaper in the Laz language in order to save the language from extinction. They were aware of the fact that writing in Laz is a burdensome task as the language has no written history and has many shortcomings in terms of terminology. Although some of them knew Laz, they had never written in Laz before.

On 11 July 2013, it was announced that a bimonthly newspaper in Laz with the name Agani Murutsxi will be launched. Its name is a salute to the world’s first newspaper in the Laz language, Mç’ita Murutsxi (Red Star), founded by İskender Chitaşi in Sukhumi, the capital of Abkhazia, Georgian SSR and launched on 7 November 1929, but published only twice.

== The newspaper ==
Founded and owned by İrfan Çağatay, who also took over the post of editor-in-chief, Agani Murutsxi was launched in Istanbul on 11 September 2013. It is the world's second and Turkey's first newspaper in the Laz language. It has eight pages in Berliner format, being slightly taller and marginally wider than the tabloid/compact format. The newspaper covers culture, sports and political news as well as articles and cartoons on topics like assimilation. Published in the beginning bimonthly and later monthly, it has an average circulation of 1,000 printed newspapers distributed in Laz populated areas (Rize and Artvin Province) and the cities of western part of Turkey, where Laz population is concentrated, such as: Istanbul, İzmir, Ankara, Bursa, Sakarya, Kocaeli and Düzce.
