= Milliyet =

Turkish daily newspaper

- Typical Milliyet front page
- Type: Daily newspaper
- Format: Broadsheet
- Owner: Demirören Holding
- Founded: 11 February 1926; 100 years ago
- Political alignment: Conservatism; Turkish nationalism Historically: Kemalism, Secularism, Liberalism
- Language: Turkish
- Headquarters: Bağcılar
- City: Istanbul
- Country: Turkey
- Circulation: 182,955 (26 January-1 February 2015)
- Website: www.milliyet.com.tr

Milliyet (Turkish for "nationality") is a daily newspaper published in Istanbul, Turkey.

== History and profile ==
Milliyet came to publishing life at the Nuri Akça press in Babıali, Istanbul as a daily private newspaper on 3 May 1950. Its owner was Ali Naci Karacan. After his death in 1955 the paper was published by his son, Encüment Karacan.

For a number of years the person who made his mark on the paper as the editor-in-chief was Abdi İpekçi. İpekçi managed to raise the standards of the Turkish press by introducing his journalistic criteria. On 1 February 1979, İpekçi was murdered by Mehmet Ali Ağca, who would later attempt to assassinate Pope John Paul II. Between 14 August and 27 August 1983 the paper was temporarily banned by the martial law authorities.

Milliyet is published in the broadsheet format.

In 2001 Milliyet had a circulation of 337,000 copies. According to comScore, Milliyet's website is the fifth most visited news website in Europe.

=== Ownership ===
In 1979 the founding Karacan family sold the paper to Aydın Doğan. Erdoğan Demirören, who owned 25% of the paper, later also sold his stake to Doğan. In October 1998 the paper was briefly sold to Korkmaz Yiğit, before being bought back within weeks when Yiğit's business empire collapsed in the face of unrelated fraud allegations.

The paper was purchased by a joint venture of the Demirören Group and Karacan Group in May 2011, but after legal and financial issues Karacan sold its stake to Demirören in February 2012.

== Editorial line ==
Since 1994, Milliyet has abandoned its stable, "upmarket" journalism established by Abdi İpekçi for a middle-market editorial line akin to that of Hürriyet. The Internet edition of Milliyet often incorporates sensational material from The Sun and Daily Mail and there is tremendous amount of overlap among the daily coverage, such as identical articles and photographs.

Milliyet has been criticised for having self-censored a column that was critical of the Prime Minister's reaction to a press leak. The column was frozen out for two weeks and then blanket-refused for publication.

In early 2012 Milliyet fired Ece Temelkuran, after she had written articles critical of the government's handling of the December 2011 Uludere massacre, and Nuray Mert, after Turkish Prime Minister Recep Tayyip Erdoğan publicly criticized her.

In 2013, Milliyet fired columnists Hasan Cemal and Can Dündar, who had taken critical stances against the AKP government.

== Supplements ==
Milliyet has published several supplements. One of them was Milliyet Çocuk, a children's magazine published as a supplement of the paper between its start in 1972 and 1974 before becoming an independent publication.

== Digital archives ==
In September 2009, Milliyet opened its digital archive, becoming the first Turkish newspaper to do so.

== Notable people ==
- Ahmet Altan
- Duygu Asena
- Hikmet Bilâ
- Mehmet Ali Birand
- Orhan Boran
- Emin Çölaşan
- Can Dündar
- Burçak Evren
- Burhan Felek
- Abdi İpekçi
- İsmail Cem İpekçi
- Halit Kıvanç
- Nuray Mert
- Reha Muhtar
- Altan Öymen
- Çetin Özek
- Peyami Safa
- Derya Sazak
- Erman Şener
- Ece Temelkuran
- Metin Toker
- Rıza Türmen
- Didem Ünsal

== See also ==
- List of newspapers in Turkey
