= Korkmaz Yiğit =

Turkish businessman (born 1943)

- Born: 1943 (age 82–83)
- Occupation: Businessman

Korkmaz Yiğit (born 1943 in Erzincan) is a Turkish businessman. He made his fortune in construction, and expanded into finance and media, but fell rapidly from grace in 1998 when apparent connections with mob figure Alaattin Çakıcı were revealed.

== Career ==
After making his fortune in construction, Yiğit sought to move into finance in the mid-1990s. He bid in the privatization tender for Etibank, and after this was unsuccessful bought Bankekspres from Doğuş Holding for $100m in March 1997.

In 1998, he acquired private television stations Kanal E and Tele 4, and then Kanal 6 (the latter for $110m). In August 1998, he bought the Ateş and Yeni Yüzyıl newspapers ($75m), and in early October he acquired control of Milliyet ($300m).

In August 1998, he had won the privatization tender for the majority of Türk Ticaret Bankası, with a $600m bid, but after apparent connections with mob figure Alaattin Çakıcı were revealed in October, known as the "Türkbank scandal", the deal was put on hold on 14 October pending a parliamentary inquiry. The Doğan Media Group bought back Milliyet on 22 October. Bankekspres was seized by the government for a symbolic TL1bn. Yiğit was jailed pending trial, accused of conspiracy in the Turkbank privatization and of defrauding Bankekspres.

In 2007, TMSF took some of Yiğit's companies in part-payment of debts owed.
