= Daily Sabah =

Turkish daily newspaper

- Type: Daily newspaper
- Owner: Turkuvaz Media Group
- Publisher: Turkuvaz Gazete Dergi Basım A.Ş.
- Editor-in-chief: İbrahim Altay
- Founded: 2014
- Political alignment: Erdoğanism; Right-wing populism Conservatism
- Language: English, Arabic
- Headquarters: Istanbul, Turkey
- Circulation: 8,588
- Website: dailysabah.com

The Daily Sabah (lit. 'Daily Morning') is a Turkish pro-government daily newspaper published in Turkey. Available in English and owned by Turkuvaz Media Group, Daily Sabah published its first issue on 24 February 2014. Since 2018, the editor-in-chief is İbrahim Altay.

The newspaper has been frequently called a propaganda outlet for the Turkish government and the ruling Justice and Development Party (AKP). It is owned by a friend of Turkish president Recep Tayyip Erdoğan.

== History ==
The Daily Sabah was established in 2014 when a highly-antagonistic political climate reigned in Turkish politics. After the conflict in December 2013 between the Gülen movement, a religious civil society organization with some political aspirations, and the ruling Justice and Development Party (AKP), the Gülen movement's Today's Zaman turned into an ardent critic of the ruling AKP. To balance the critical discourse against the AKP by Today's Zaman and Hürriyet Daily News, a secular critic of the AKP, Daily Sabah emerged as a supportive voice of the AKP in the English language.

== Editorial policy and viewpoints ==
Daily Sabah describes itself as "committed to the democracy, the rule of law, human rights and liberty". However, the paper is described as a mouthpiece of the AKP by Foreign Policy.

According to the German newspaper Der Spiegel, Daily Sabah is critical of the Gülen movement, which the AKP government accuses of trying to overthrow the government in an attempted coup in 2016. Daily Sabah has been described as using transparent, ill-formed, and Turkish-style propaganda to advance the AKP government's version of events by Der Spiegel.

== Criticism ==
In March 2017, Jeroen Lenaers of the European Parliament called Daily Sabah "hate press" and tried to prohibit the distribution of Daily Sabah in parliamentary sessions. The European Parliament has made accusations about the lack of freedom of speech and expression in Turkey, and Daily Sabah defends the AKP government's human rights record. Daily Sabah has said the decision to prohibit its distribution was a violation of the freedoms of the press and expressions. Meanwhile, the EU Affairs Minister for Turkey Ömer Çelik, who is also a member of AKP per se, said the following about the issue: "The European Parliament's ban on the freedom of press is a tragic event for the future of Europe."

== Notable columnists ==
- Nebi Miş
- Muhittin Ataman
- İhsan Aktaş
- Hakkı Öcal
- Murat Yeşiltaş
- Mehmet Çelik
- Kerem Alkin
