= Aujourd'hui la Turquie =

Turkish Monthly newspaper

- Type: Monthly newspaper
- Founded: 2005
- Language: French
- Headquarters: Istanbul, Turkey
- Circulation: 12,000
- Website: aujourdhuilaturquie.com/fr/

Aujourd'hui la Turquie (Today's Turkey) is the first French-language newspaper in Turkey, published since 2005. Since its inception, the newspaper has been distributed first in Turkey and France, then in Belgium, Switzerland and Canada. Thus, it introduces Turkey politically, economically, socially and culturally in these French-speaking countries. It has a circulation of 12,000 newspapers in Turkey.
