= Yurt (newspaper) =

Turkish newspaper

- Type: Daily newspaper and website
- Editor: Emrah Aydos
- Founded: January 29, 2012
- Political alignment: Kemalism,Left-wing
- Language: Turkish
- Headquarters: Istanbul, Turkey
- Circulation: 9,987
- Website: www.yurtgazetesi.com.tr

Yurt Gazetesi is a national daily newspaper and website published in Turkey. It started broadcasting on January 29, 2012. The paper is owned by former Republican People's Party politician Durdu Özbolat. The editor-in-chief of the newspaper is Bilal Başer and its Istanbul representative is Abdullah Ağırkan.

== Awards ==
- Social Democracy Foundation Human Rights Democracy Peace and Solidarity Award (2014)
