= 4. Levent station =

Station of the Istanbul Metro

4. Levent
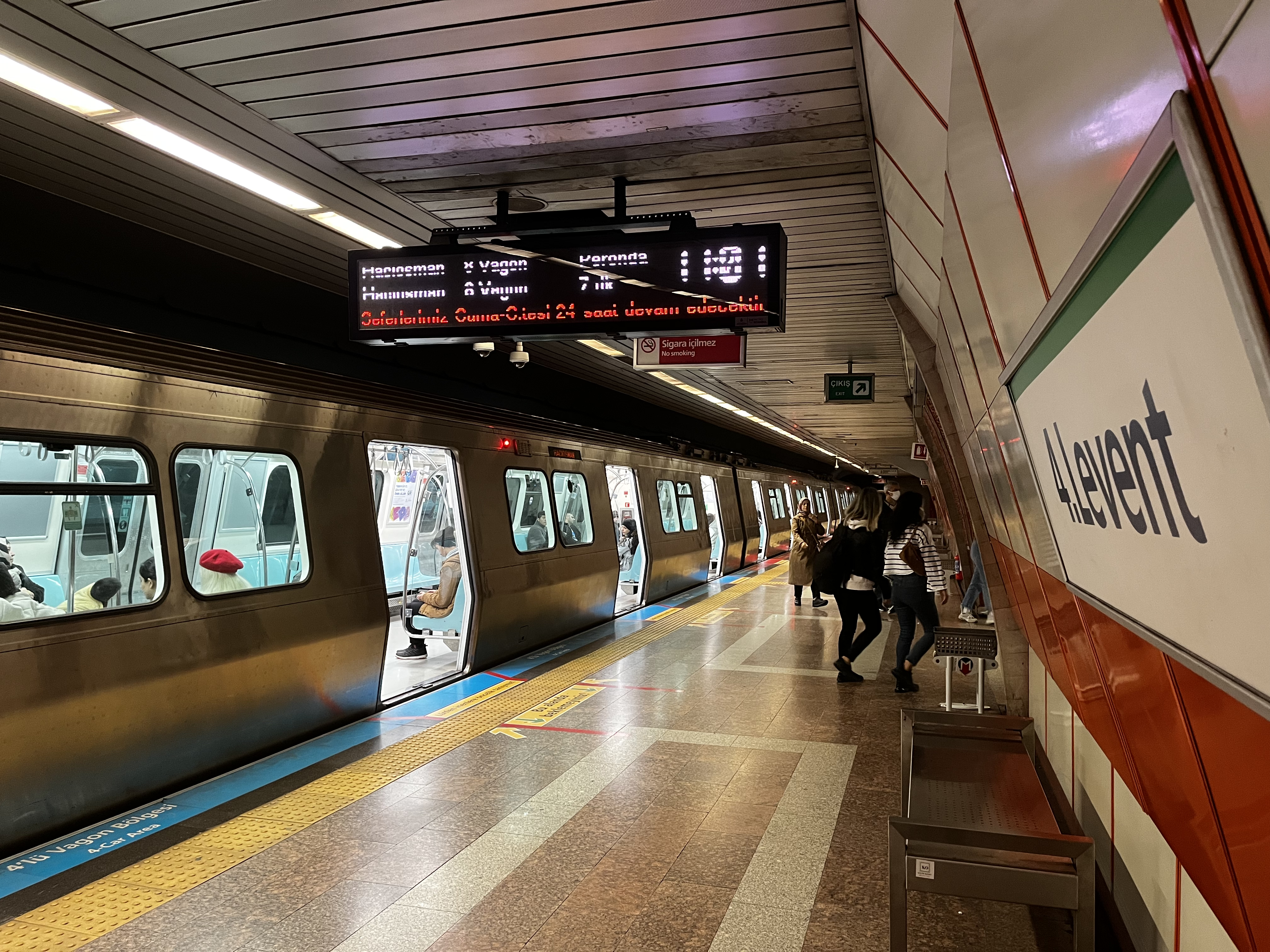
- 4. Levent station of the Istanbul Metro

General information
- Coordinates: 41.085102°N 29.007447°E
- Owner: Istanbul Metro
- Line: M2
- Platforms: 1 island platform
- Tracks: 2
- Connections: İETT Bus: 25G, 27E, 27SE, 27T, 29, 29A, 29B, 29C, 29D, 29E, 29GM, 29P, 29Ş, 36G, 36L, 36Z, 40B, 41, 41A, 41AT, 41E, 41SM, 42, 42M, 48L, 50F, 50Z, 500L, 59RK, 59RS, 65A, E-3, EL2; Istanbul Minibus: 4.Levent Metro-Darüşşafaka, 4.Levent Metro-Baltalimanı, Baltalimanı-Reşitpaşa-4. Levent

Construction
- Structure type: Underground
- Accessible: Yes

History
- Opened: 16 September 2000
- Electrified: 750V DC Third rail

Services
Preceding station	Istanbul Metro	Following station
Levent towards Yenikapı	M2 Line	Sanayi Mahallesi towards Hacıosman
Location

4. Levent is an underground rapid transit station on the M2 line of the Istanbul Metro. It is located in northern Levent under Büyükdere Avenue in Kâğıthane. The station opened on 16 September 2000 and is one of the original six stations of the M2 line. Between 2000 and 2009 4. Levent was the northern terminus of the line and the tracks north of the station would serve as storage tracks for rolling stock. Connections to İETT bus service are available as İETT operates a large bus hub next to the station. The Istanbul Sapphire is situated next to the station and used to be the tallest building in Turkey, standing at a height of 261 m (856 ft). 4. Levent has an island platform serviced by two tracks.

== Layout ==
Southbound	← toward Yenikapı
Island platform
Northbound	toward Hacıosman →
