= Hürriyet =

Turkish newspaper

- First issue, dated 1 May 1948
- Type: Daily newspaper
- Format: Berliner (Broadsheet prior to 15 October 2012)
- Owner: Demirören Holding
- Editor: Hasan Kılıç
- Founded: 1948; 78 years ago
- Political alignment: Mainstream; Liberalism; Secularism pro-government (after 2018)
- Language: Turkish
- Headquarters: Güneşli, Bağcılar
- City: Istanbul
- Country: Turkey
- Circulation: ▼319,273 (8 January 2018 – 14 January 2018)
- Website: www.hurriyet.com.tr

Hürriyet (Turkish pronunciation: [hyɾ.ɾiˈjet], Liberty) is a major Turkish newspaper, founded in 1948. Headquartered in Istanbul, Hürriyet combines entertainment with news coverage and has a mainstream conservative outlook. Since 2018 it has been owned by Demirören Holding.

== History ==
=== Foundation (1948) and early history ===
Hürriyet was founded by Sedat Simavi on 1 May 1948 with a staff of 48. Selling 50,000 copies in its first week, Hürriyet was Simavi's 59th and last publication. On 13 January 1965 the paper was confiscated by the Turkish authorities shortly after the publication of the letter of the US President Lyndon B. Johnson to İsmet İnönü. In the letter, Johnson overtly stated that Turkey should not organize any military intervention in Cyprus.

As of 2008, Hürriyet had regional offices in Ankara, İzmir, Adana, Antalya, and Trabzon, as well as a news network comprising 52 offices and 600 reporters in Turkey and abroad, all affiliated with Doğan News Agency, which primarily serves newspapers and television channels that were previously under the management of Doğan Media Group (Doğan Yayın Holding). Hürriyet is printed in six cities in Turkey and in Frankfurt, Germany.

=== Tax fine controversy (2009) ===
In February 2009, the newspaper received an 826.2 million TL (US$523 million) fine for tax evasion by Doğan Group/Petrol Ofisi. Following this, the Istanbul Stock Exchange suspended Doğan Holding's shares, and Fitch downgraded the rating of Hürriyet to "BB−".

Executives at the Doğan Group expressed the opinion that the tax fine was politically motivated "intimidation", caused by Hürriyet's linking of Prime Minister Recep Tayyip Erdoğan and his political party, AKP, to a charity scandal in Germany. In March 2009, Jose Manuel Barroso, president of the European Commission, expressed public concern about the fine, saying that it threatened "pluralism and freedom of the press." In September 2009, Doğan Group was fined a record US$2.5 billion, related to alleged past tax irregularities. The September fine caused further expressions of public concern from the European Commission, as well as the Organization for Security and Co-operation in Europe. It also caused some critics and global investors to compare the fines to then-Russian President Vladimir Putin's use of tax-evasion charges to bankrupt oil company Yukos for allegedly political reasons. In an interview, Erdoğan denied this charge, calling it "very ugly" and "disrespectful" to both himself and Putin.

=== Sale (2018) ===
On 21 March 2018, Doğan Yayın Holding, the parent company of Hürriyet, was sold to Demirören Holding for approximately $1.2 billion. The Demirören Group is known for its pro-government stance; the Demirören family are considered to be close to President Erdoğan.

== Description ==
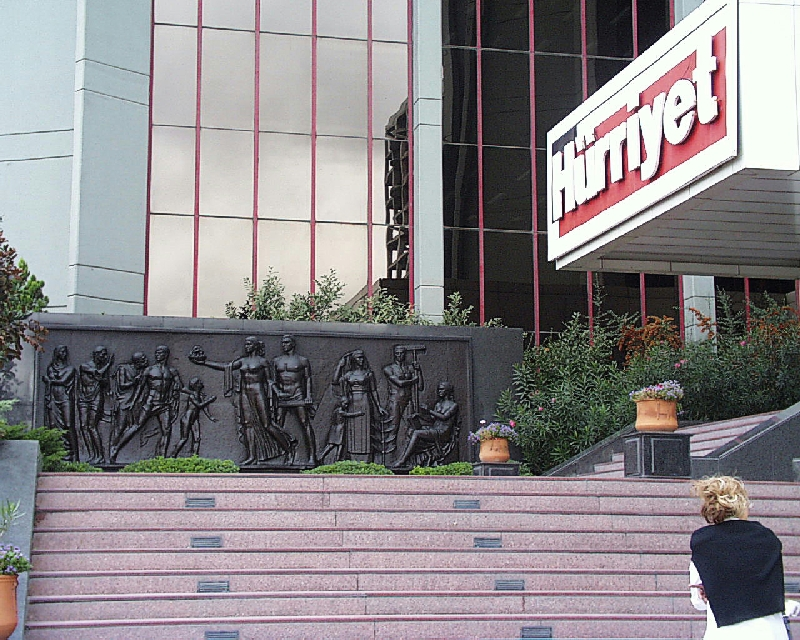
Hürriyet headquarters in Istanbul

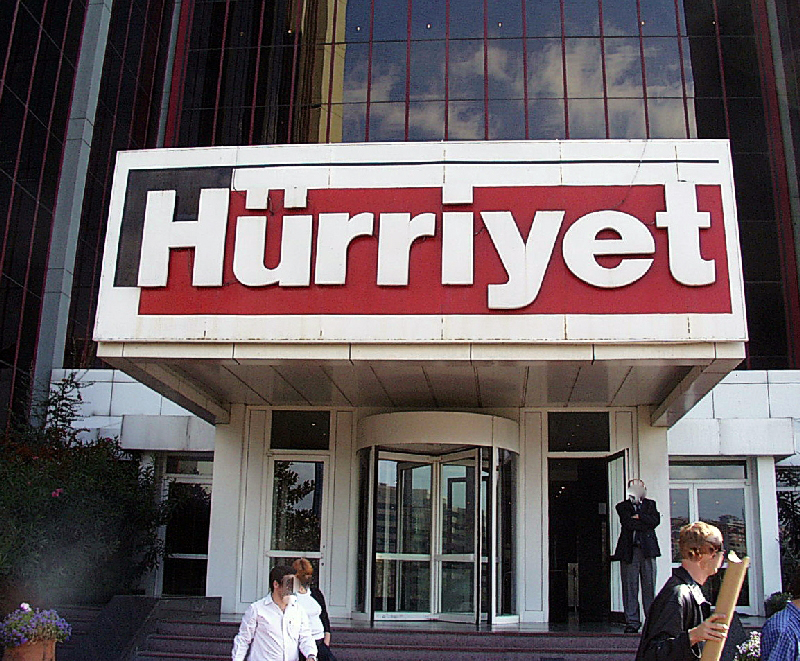
Entrance to the headquarters

Entertainment and news coverage are mixed in Hürriyet and it is liberal and conservative.

It is considered a high-circulation newspaper in Turkey. As of May 2026, according to semrush, its website was the eighth most visited website in Turkey, having 93.7 million monthly visits. As of September 2025, it had the 2nd highest circulation of any newspaper in Turkey, at around 186,000.

== Golden Butterfly Awards ==
As of 2016, Hürriyet, along with Pantene, sponsors the annual Golden Butterfly Awards, in which its readers vote for nominees in the fields of Turkish television and music.

== Notable people ==
In the early 1950s, photojournalist Ara Güler (1928-2018) worked at the newspaper.

Others who have been associated with Hürriyet include:

- Ahmet Altan
- Fatih Altaylı
- Burak Bekdil
- Orhan Boran
- Bekir Coşkun
- Emin Çölaşan
- Cengiz Çandar
- Oktay Ekşi
- Çetin Emeç
- Ahmet Hakan
- Doğan Hızlan
- Halit Kıvanç
- Emre Kızılkaya
- Çetin Özek
- Ertuğrul Özkök
- Erman Şener
- Doğan Uluç
- Didem Ünsal
