= Yeni Yüzyıl =

Former Turkish newspaper

- Type: Daily newspaper
- Founded: 15 April 1994
- Ceased publication: 11 June 1999
- Language: Turkish
- Headquarters: Istanbul, Turkey

Yeni Yüzyıl (New Century) was a Turkish newspaper. It was published from 1994 to 1999, closing down due to legal and financial problems. It had been acquired in August 1998 from Dinç Bilgin's Sabah group by Korkmaz Yiğit.
