= Günaydın (newspaper) =

Turkish newspaper

- Type: Daily newspaper
- Founded: 26 November 1968
- Ceased publication: 1999
- Language: Turkish
- Headquarters: Turkey
- Website: www.yenigunaydin.com

Günaydın (literally: "Good Morning") was a Turkish newspaper. It was established in 1968 by Haldun Simavi, and ceased publication in 1999.

A book on the newspaper was published in 2006, titled Türk Basınında Kayan Yıldız: Haldun Simavi'nin Günaydın'ı ("The Turkish Press's Shooting Star: Haldun Simavi's Günaydın").

== Books ==
- Tekin, Akgün (2006), Türk Basınında Kayan Yıldız: Haldun Simavi'nin Günaydın'ı, Doğan Kitap / Anı Dizisi. ISBN 9789752934559
