= Dinç Bilgin =

Turkish businessman

Dinç Bilgin (born 1940) is a Turkish businessman who founded Medya Holding, a media group that was made up of a number of newspapers including Sabah (1985) and Takvim (1994), and a number of television stations, including ATV (1993). These companies were later sold for $ 1.1 Billion. He also founded Ateş and Yeni Yüzyıl in 1995, selling them to Korkmaz Yiğit in 1998.

== Career ==
Bilgin began his career at Yeni Asır. He founded a number of newspapers including Sabah (1985) and Takvim (1994), and a number of television stations, including ATV (1993). He also founded the now-defunct Ateş and Yeni Yüzyıl in 1995, selling them to Korkmaz Yiğit in 1998.

Etibank was privatised on 2 March 1998 to Medya İpek Holding A.Ş., co-owned by Bilgin and Cavit Çağlar, for $155m. The bank was sold to Bilgin's Medya Sabah Holding A.Ş. in 2000. It was taken over by the government's TMSF in October 2000. In 2011, Bilgin was sentenced to nearly five years in prison for financial irregularities relating to his ownership of Etibank.
