= Yeni Asır =

Turkish daily newspaper

- Type: Daily newspaper and website
- Editor: Ercan Demir
- Founded: 1895
- Political alignment: Centre-right
- Language: Turkish
- Headquarters: Istanbul, Turkey
- Circulation: 52.425
- Website: www.yeniasir.com.tr

Yeni Asır is a daily newspaper that began publication in Thessaloniki on 19 August 1895. Its slogan is "Turkey's oldest newspaper". The newspaper started to be published on the Internet in December 1998. It was published in the national press on March 1, 2017. It is the oldest newspaper in Turkey.

== History ==
The newspaper was founded by Arif Bilgin on August 19, 1895, in Thessaloniki under the name Asır and began to be published under the name Yeni Asır on July 22, 1908. After Arif Bilgin's death, the newspaper continued the same line during the period of his sons, Şevket Bilgin, who assumed the joint management.
