= Sabah (newspaper) =

Turkish daily newspaper

- Type: Daily newspaper
- Format: Berliner
- Owner: Turkuvaz Media Group
- Founder: Dinç Bilgin
- Publisher: Kalyon Group
- Founded: 22 April 1985; 41 years ago
- Political alignment: Social conservatism Hard Euroscepticism; Historical; Liberal conservatism Kemalism; Economic liberalism Liberalism
- Language: Turkish
- Headquarters: Beşiktaş
- City: Istanbul
- Country: Turkey
- Circulation: ▲305.714
- Sister newspapers: Yeni Asır, Takvim, Fotomaç
- Website: www.sabah.com.tr

Sabah is a daily newspaper that began publication in Turkey on 22 April 1985. Its slogan is "Turkey's best newspaper." The newspaper began publishing online in January 1997. The newspaper, which was transferred to the Savings Deposit Insurance Fund (TMSF) in 2007 and subsequently joined the Turkuvaz Media Group, is edited by Erdal Şafak.

== History ==
After the initiative to turn İzmir's Yeni Asır newspaper into a nationwide newspaper failed, it began to be prepared in Istanbul under the ownership of Dinç Bilgin, head of this group, within Sabah Yayıncılık A.Ş. and published throughout Turkey. The first issue of Sabah was published on 22 April 1985, and its first Editor-in-Chief was Rahmi Turan. Later published under the management of Zafer Mutlu, Sabah was also managed by Ergun Babahan, Ufuk Güldemir, and Tayfun Devecioğlu in subsequent years. Shortly before Etibank was seized in 2000, Dinç Bilgin, who had entered into a 50% partnership with Turgay Ciner, transferred his shares in Sabah Publishing to Mehmet Emin Karamehmet's Çukurova Holding and Murat Vargı's MV Holding. Bilgin thus withdrew from the media sector, and the new management of Sabah Publishing passed to MTM Haber Yatırım AŞ, jointly owned by Çukurova Holding, MV Holding, and Park Holding, owned by Ciner, with Karamehmet as the majority shareholder. Dinç Bilgin returned to the newspaper in January 2001. In October 2002, it was leased by Turgay Ciner.

In November 2003, Dinç Bilgin, owner of the Bilgin Group, which owned Sabah and ATV, left the newspaper's masthead following the signing of a protocol with the Savings Deposit Insurance Fund (TMSF) for the liquidation of Etibank's debts. In March 2005, it was purchased by the Merkez Group, in which Turgay Ciner was also a partner. As of 2 January 2006, Fatih Altaylı was appointed as Editor-in-Chief. However, as of 1 April 2007, the TMSF seized Sabah newspaper due to its debts. The joint tender for Sabah and ATV was held on 7 November 2007. The opening bid in the tender was set at $1.1 billion. On 22 April 2008, its sale to Çalık Holding was approved.

== European edition ==
Sabah began to be sent by plane to Germany and other European countries starting in the 1980s to meet the newspaper and news needs of Turkish workers going to Germany to work. Due to increasing demand, it was decided in the early 1990s to also print the newspaper in Germany. In recent years, sales of the European edition have declined. Today, in addition to Sabah, Yeni Asır, Takvim, Fotomaç, and other group newspapers are also printed at facilities near the city of Frankfurt in Germany.

== Innovations and awards ==
As Turkey's first national newspaper prepared entirely on computers, it began page layout and newspaper printing using advanced technology suitable for the communication age.

Sabah was the first newspaper to implement an automatic insert system for placing advertising brochures and supplements inside the newspaper. It was announced that Sabah had secured its place among the world's leading newspapers in the use of technology for color and text integration in pre-press and printing technology. With the printing system implemented for the first time in Turkey, Sabah applied 48-page full-color printing and, by continuously increasing its color page capacity, created more space for color advertisements, as announced by the advertising association. Regarding print quality, Sabah Newspaper is known to be one of the first newspapers to deliver coated paper quality to its readers throughout Turkey.

== Notable contributors (past and present) ==
- Engin Ardıç (1952–2023), journalist
- Haşmet Babaoğlu (born 1955), journalist
- Mehmet Barlas (1942–2023), columnist
- Mehmet Ali Birand (1941–2013), journalist
- Yavuz Donat (born 1942), journalist
- Salih Memecan (born 1952), cartoonist
- Hıncal Uluç (1939–2022), journalist
- Didem Ünsal (born 1966), journalist
- Ahmet Vardar (1937–2010), journalist
