= Kemerburgaz =

Village in Istanbul Province, Turkey

- Village
- Location in Istanbul Province
- Coordinates: 41°09′42″N 28°55′14″E
- Country: Turkey
- Region: Marmara
- Province: Istanbul Province
- District: Eyüp
- Time zone: UTC+3 (TRT)
- Postal code: 34075
- Area code: 0–212

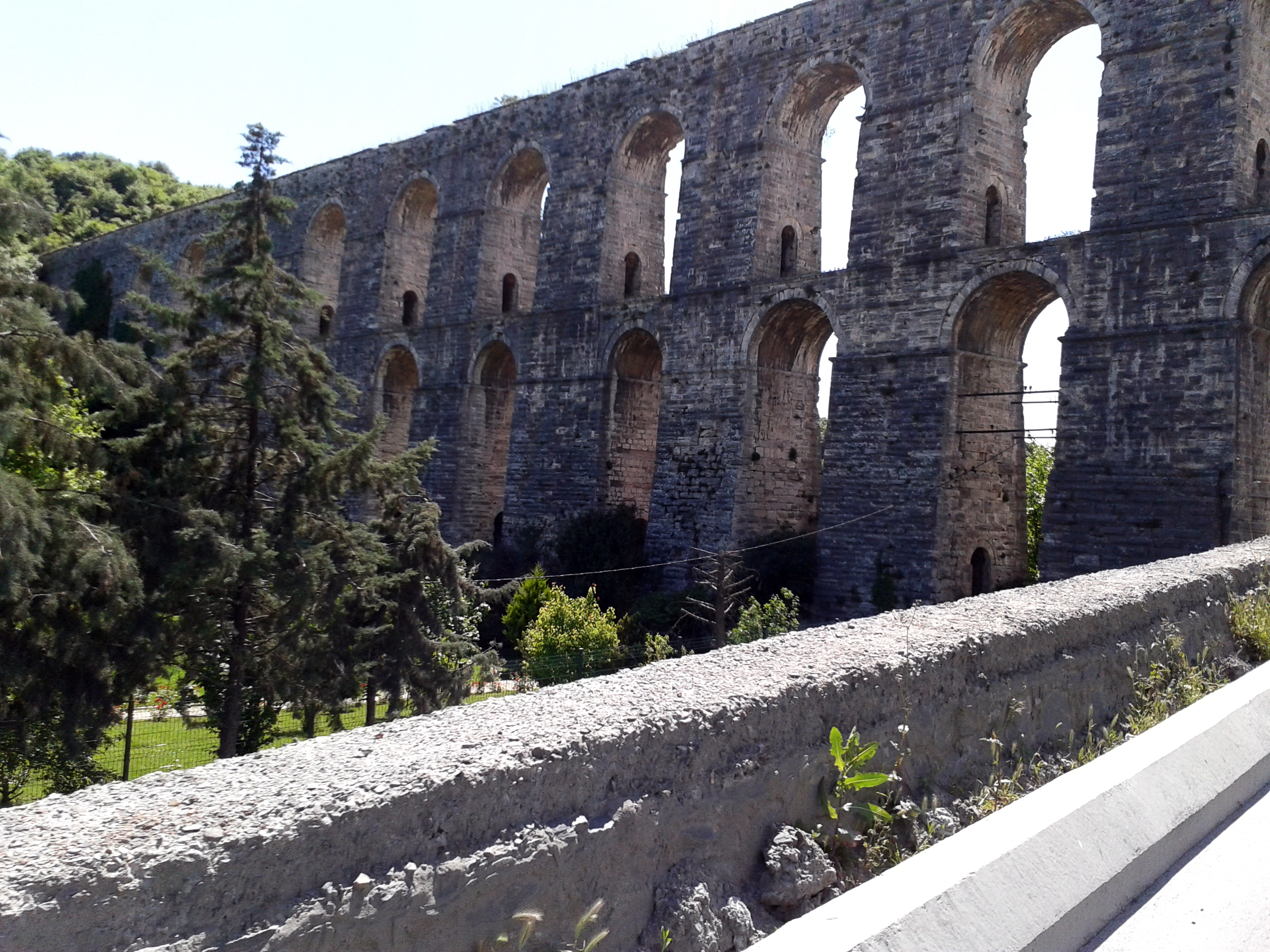

Kemerburgaz is a village in the Eyüp district of Istanbul Province, Turkey.

== Toponymy ==
Kemerburgaz is a historic settlement located southwest of Belgrad Forest between the aqueducts Kurt Kemeri ("Wolf's Aqueduct") and Uzun Kemer ("Long Aqueduct"). During the Byzantine era (c. 330–1453), its name was Pyrgos (Greek: Πύργος, for 'tower' or 'bastion'). After the conquest of Istanbul in 1453, it was renamed Burgaz, the Turkish language translation for bastion. Local people changed its name to Kemerburgaz, a concatenation of Kemer ('aqueduct') and Burgaz, when the renowned architect Mimar Sinan (c. 1489/1490–1588) repaired the ruined Byzantine aqueducts and built new waterways in the area.

== Demographics ==
The ethnographic structure of the village remained quite unchanged during the Ottoman era after the conquest (1453–1923). According to the first census conducted after the Turkish War of Independence, the village had 360 Greek-origin and ten Turkish households. The Turkish residents were immigrants from Bulgaria during the Russo-Turkish War (1877–78). During the 1923 population exchange between Greece and Turkey, Turkish people from Thessaloniki were settled in the village replacing the people of Greek origin, who were sent in exchange to Greece, where they founded the settlement of Neos Pyrgos (New Pyrgos) in North Euboea.

== Access ==
İETT city bus lines #48 (Göktürk-Mecidiyeköy, #48A (Göktürk-Kazlıçeşme), #48E (Göktürk-Eminönü), #48K (Kemerburgaz-Ağaçlı Köyü), #48KA (Kemerburgaz-Arnavutköy), #48L (Göktürk-4. Levent Metro), and #48P (Kemerburgaz-Akpınar) serve Kemerburgaz from various locations of Istanbul.
