= Göktürk, Istanbul =

Göktürk
- Neighbourhood
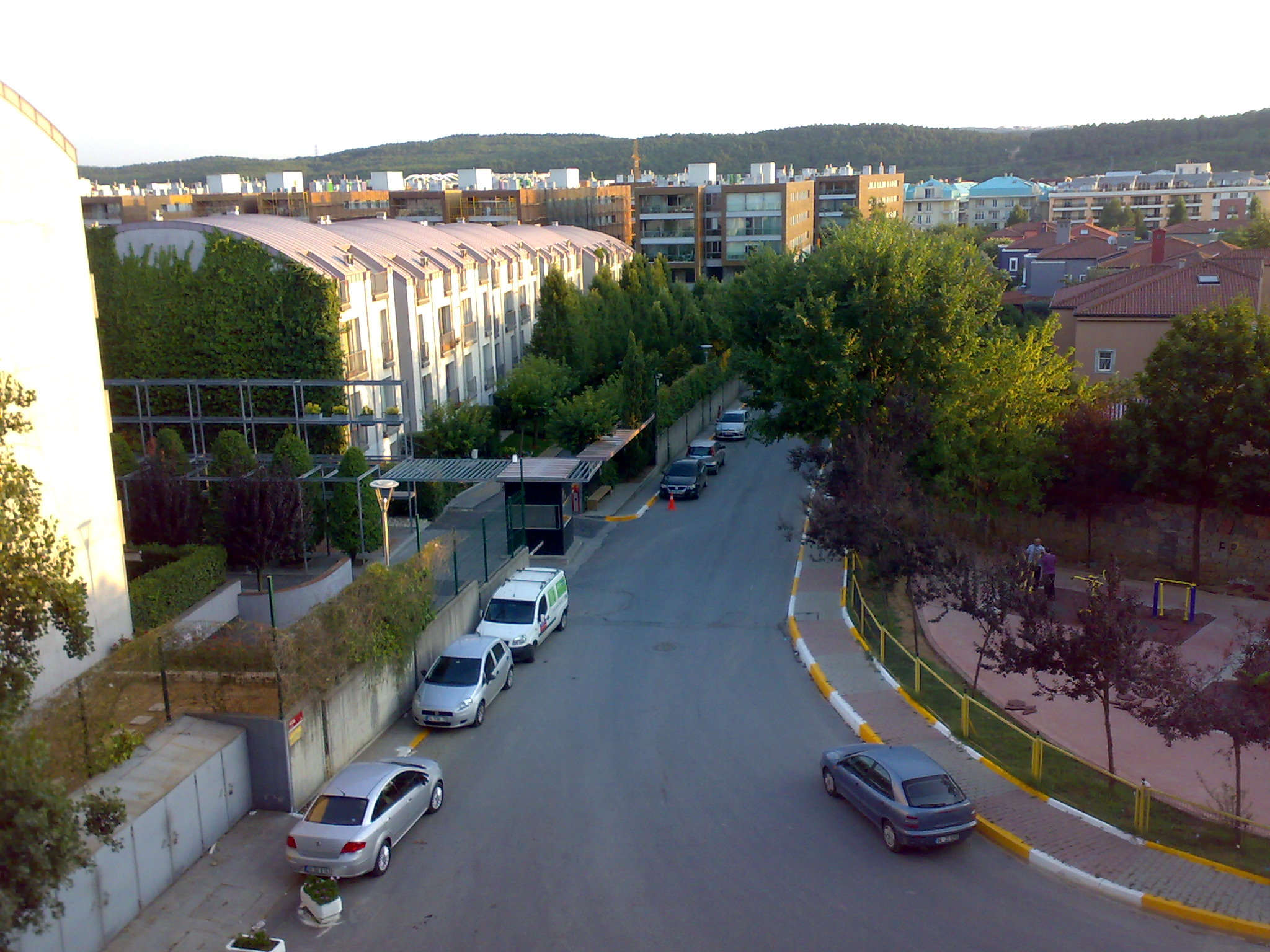

- Location within Turkey Location within Istanbul
- Coordinates: 41°10′47″N 28°53′17″E
- Country: Turkey
- Province: Istanbul
- District: Eyüpsultan
- Population (2022): 39,639
- Time zone: UTC+3 (TRT)
- Postal code: 34077
- Area code: 0212

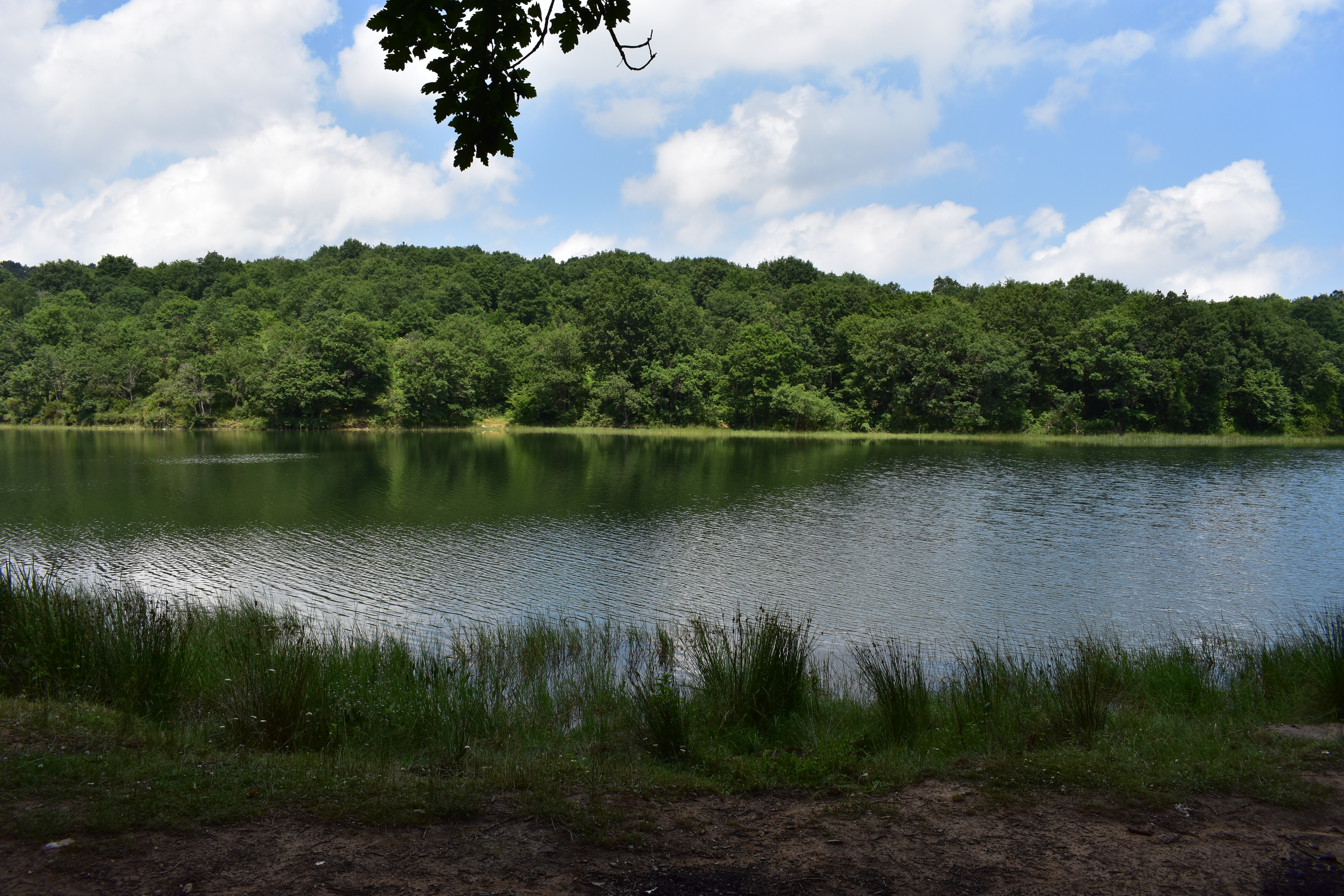
Göktürk Pond Nature Park

Göktürk or Göktürk Merkez, formerly known as Pektinaxôrion or Petnahor, is a neighbourhood in the municipality and district of Eyüpsultan, Istanbul Province, Turkey. Its population is 39,639 (as of 2022). It was an independent municipality until it was merged into the municipality of Eyüp in 2008.

== Transportation ==
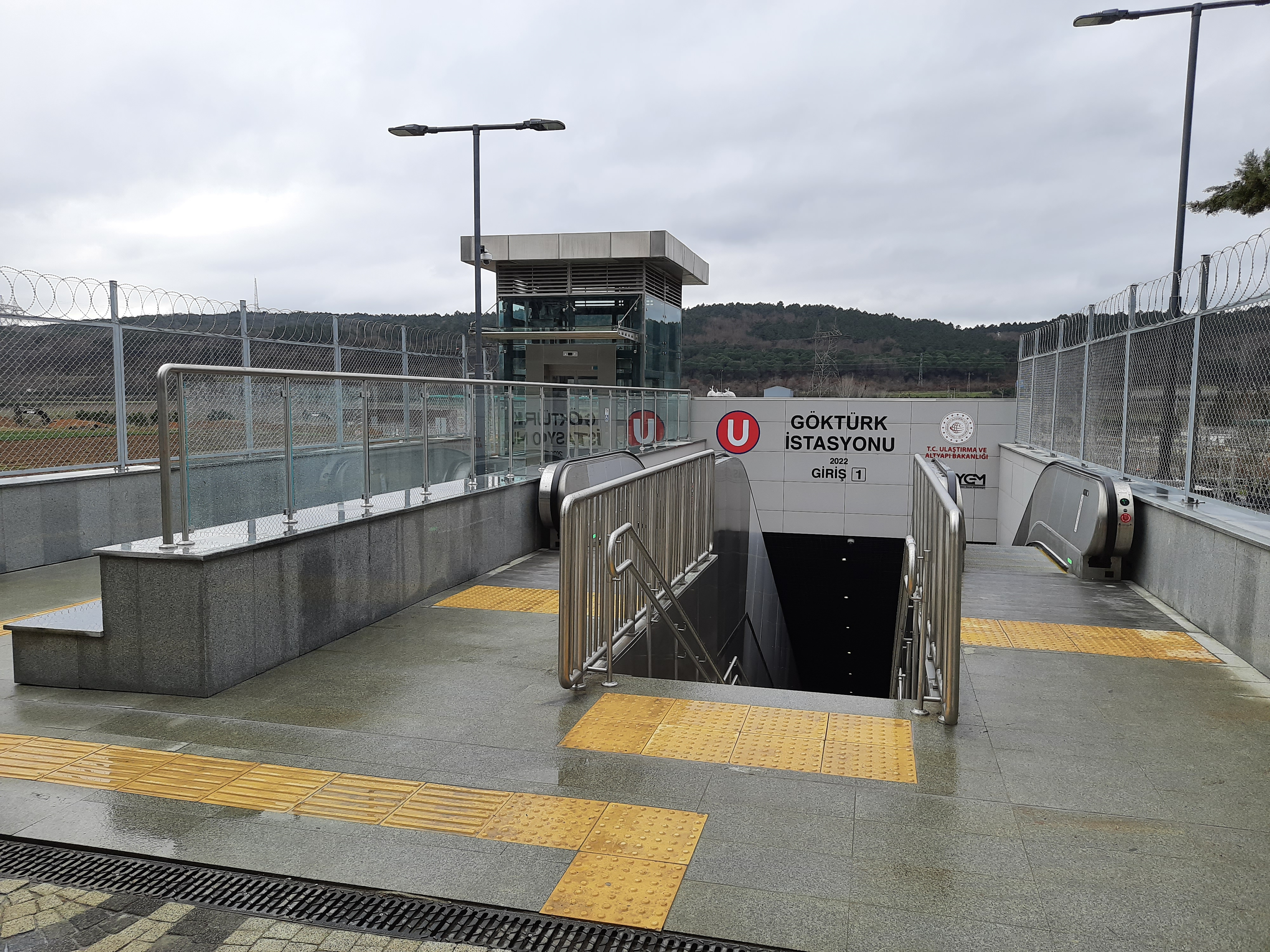
Entrance of the Göktürk metro station

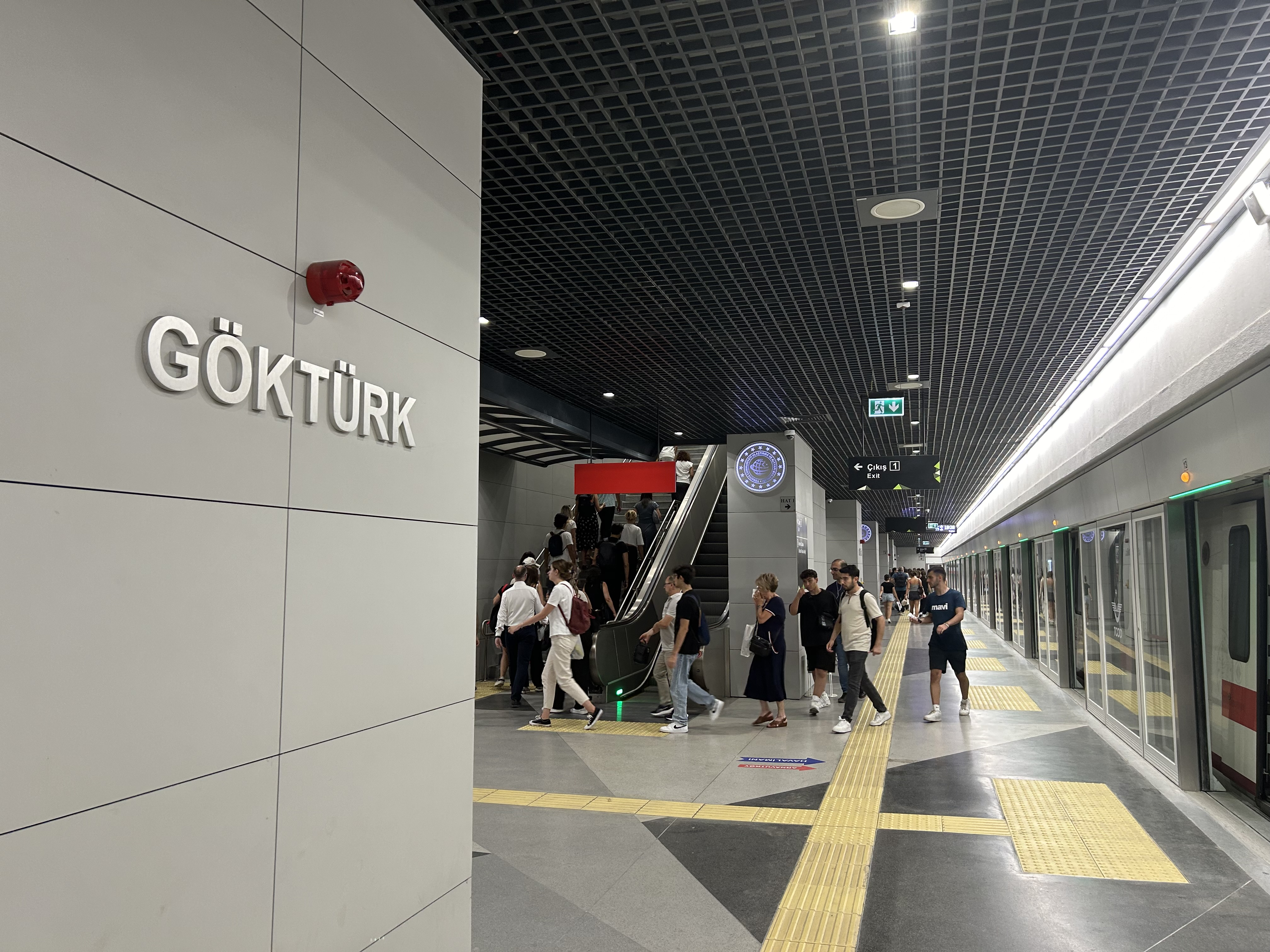
Interior the Göktürk Metro Station

=== Metro ===
Göktürk has a metro station on the M11 line of the Istanbul Metro.

=== Bus Lines ===
Göktürk is served by the public bus lines.

- 48: Göktürk - Mecidiyeköy
- 48A: Göktürk - Kazlıçeşme Marmaray
- 48D: Göktürk - Hacıosman Metro
- 48G: Göktürk - Pirinççiköy - Mescid-i Selam
- 48K: Kemerburgaz - Ağaçlı
- 48L: Göktürk - 4. Levent Metro
- 48P: Kemerburgaz - Akpınar
- 48KA: Kemerburgaz - Arnavutköy
- 48Y: Göktürk - Yeşilpınar
- H-2: Mecidiyeköy - Istanbul Airport (Only night service)
