= Kalyon Group =

Turkish conglomerate

- Founded: 1974; 52 years ago
- Founder: Ömer Faruk Kalyoncu
- Website: kalyonholding.com

Kalyon Group is a Turkish conglomerate, with major interests in construction. It was founded by Ömer Faruk Kalyoncu.

In 2013, it was part of a joint venture which won the €22 billion contract to construct a third international airport in Istanbul. Other contracts include Istanbul's Metrobus system, the construction of a new stadium for İstanbul Büyükşehir Belediyesi S.K., Karapınar solar power plant, and the redevelopment of Taksim Gezi Park to reconstruct the Taksim Military Barracks.

The company was founded in 1974 by Hasan Kalyoncu and is now run by his sons. Kalyoncu was a close friend of the former President and Prime Minister Turgut Özal. Kalyon was described in 2013 by the BBC as "a company which has close ties with the governing Justice and Development (AK) Party".

In 2022, the International Holding Company from the UAE acquired 50% of Kalyon.
