= Uğur Dündar =

Turkish journalist (born 1943)

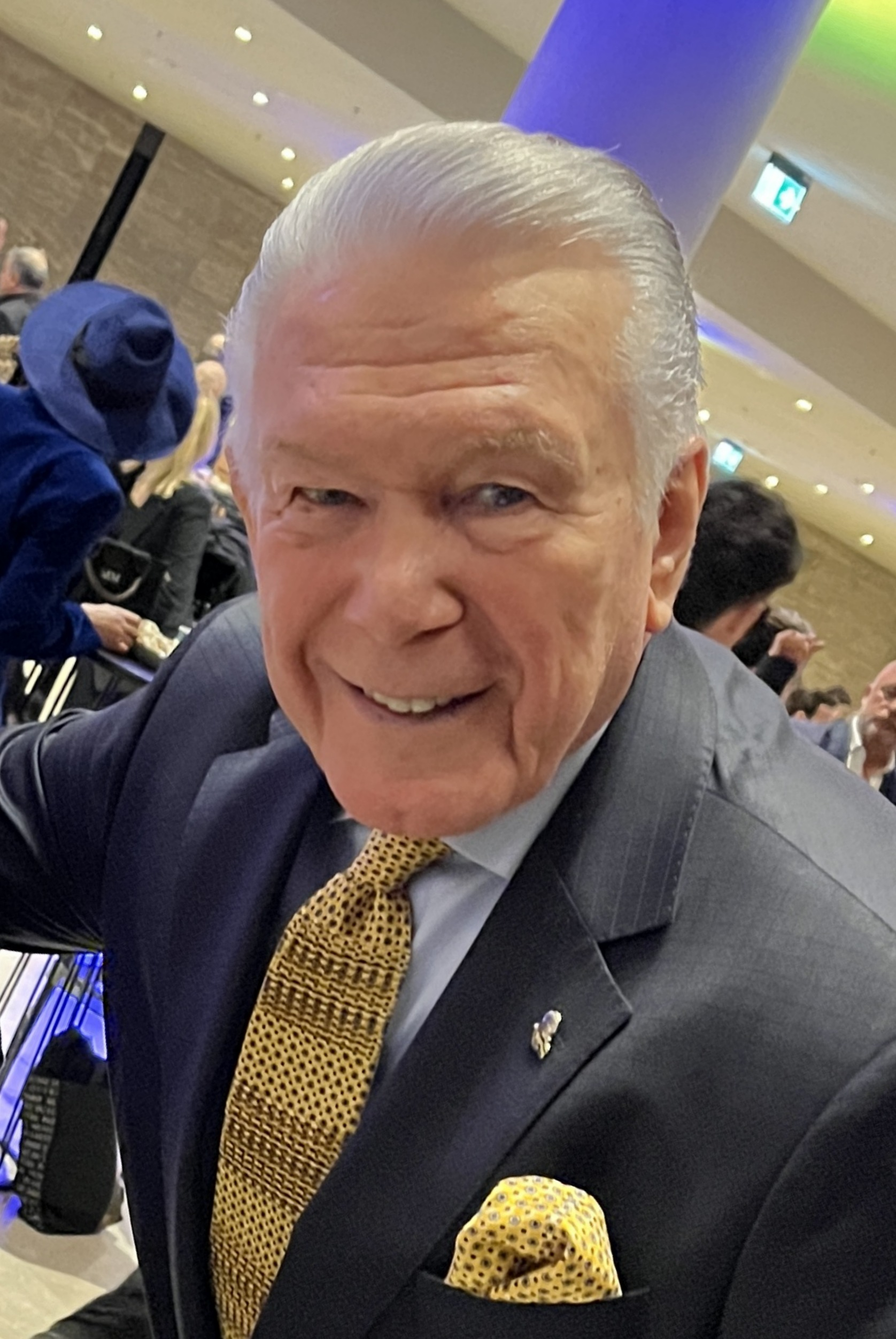
- Born: 28 August 1943 (age 83); Silivri, Istanbul, Turkey
- Education: Istanbul University Economics Faculty
- Occupations: Journalist, anchorman, writer
- Spouse: Yasemin Baradan (m. 1993)
- Children: 3
- Website: ugurdundar.com.tr

Uğur Dündar (born 28 August 1943) is a Turkish journalist, anchorman, political commentator, and writer.

He was born in Akören village of Silivri district in Istanbul Province. He graduated from Istanbul University's Institute of Journalism. He joined Turkish Radio and Television Corporation in 1970 and built a journalistic career over more than 20 years. Until 2011 Dündar was the anchorman of Star TV where he headed the news team.

Currently, he is writing for Sözcü and has a program on Halk TV.

He is the chairman of the high council of Fenerbahçe SK since 9th April 2022 and also was board member between 20 February 2000 – 3 March 2002.

== Bibliography ==
- Haramzade (1995, with Haluk Şahin)
- Haramzadenin Dönüşü (2006, with Haluk Şahin)
- İşte Hayatım, Uğur Dündar (2010, with Nedim Şener), Doğan Kitapçılık
- İyi Uykular Sayın Seyirciler (2012)
- Yalandan Kim Ölmüş, (2013, with Orhan Baykal)
- Pazarlık Yok (2015)
- Vah Ülkem Vah (2016)
- Ya Atatürk Olmasaydı (2017)
- O Halde Biz Anlatalım (2018)
