= OdaTV =

Turkish news portal

- Logo
- Type: Online News Portal
- Founder(s): Soner Yalçın and Cüneyt Özdemir
- Publisher: Soner Yalçın
- Editor-in-chief: Serdar Cebe (2021–)
- News editor: Barış Terkoğlu
- Founded: 2007
- Political alignment: Kemalism
- Language: Turkish
- Headquarters: Kadıköy, Istanbul
- Website: www.odatv4.com

OdaTV (also known as Odatv.com, Odatv or oda^{TV}), an online news portal based in Turkey, was founded in 2007. It is one of the most followed news portals in Turkey and according to the Alexa statistics, it is the 119th most visited website in the country (Turkey).

The portal was founded by Soner Yalçın and Cüneyt Özdemir. Özdemir soon left after a difference of opinion. OdaTV was described in 2012 by the Committee to Protect Journalists as a portal which is "harshly critical of the government". In the early 2011, Odatv case was initiated as part of the Ergenekon trials, with OdaTV accused of being the "media arm" of the Ergenekon organization. Twelve of its journalists were under indictment in connection with the case, which Reporters without Borders has called "absurd". The court acquitted all journalists in April 2017 after the prosecutors failed to provide enough evidence.

On 2019, OdaTV writer Nihat Genç left the newspaper to found his own newspaper Veryansın TV.

== Ergenekon trials ==
In February 2011, OdaTV's offices were raided and some of its staff were arrested (including the founder Soner Yalçın and executive editor Barış Pehlivan as well as news co-ordinator Doğan Yurdakul, journalist Barış Terkoğlu) and accused of links with the Ergenekon organization. Odatv columnists Muhammet Sait Çakır, Coşkun Musluk and Müyesser Uğur were also charged.

Digital documents linking to the Ergenekon conspiracy are the basis of the case against Barış Terkoğlu, Ahmet Şık, Nedim Şener and the other detainees in the OdaTV case. Examinations of the documents conducted by computer experts at Boğaziçi University, Yıldız Technical University, Middle East Technical University, and the American data processing company DataDevastation have refuted the validity of the documents, concluding that outside sources targeted the journalists' computers. Rare and malicious computer viruses, including Autorun-BJ and Win32:Malware-gen, allowed the placement of the documents to go unnoticed by the defendants. Another judicial report prepared by the governmental agency TÜBİTAK also confirmed the infection by malicious viruses but could not confirm or reject any outside intervention.

Digital forensics company Arsenal Consulting examined the OdaTV evidence and found that while the malware on Barış Pehlivan's OdaTV computer was much more interesting than known prior to Arsenal’s involvement (e.g. the Ahtapot remote access trojan never seen before “in the wild”), it was not responsible for delivery of the incriminating documents. The “Anchors in Relative Time” analysis technique was used to reveal a series of local (physical access) and remote (across the Internet) attacks against his computer. The final two local attacks (on the evenings of February 9 and 11, 2011) resulted in delivery of the incriminating documents to his computer, just prior to its seizure by the Turkish National Police. Arsenal’s work has been covered by Motherboard and a detailed case study is under ongoing development.
