= Coşkun Aral =

Turkish journalist and film producer (born 1956)

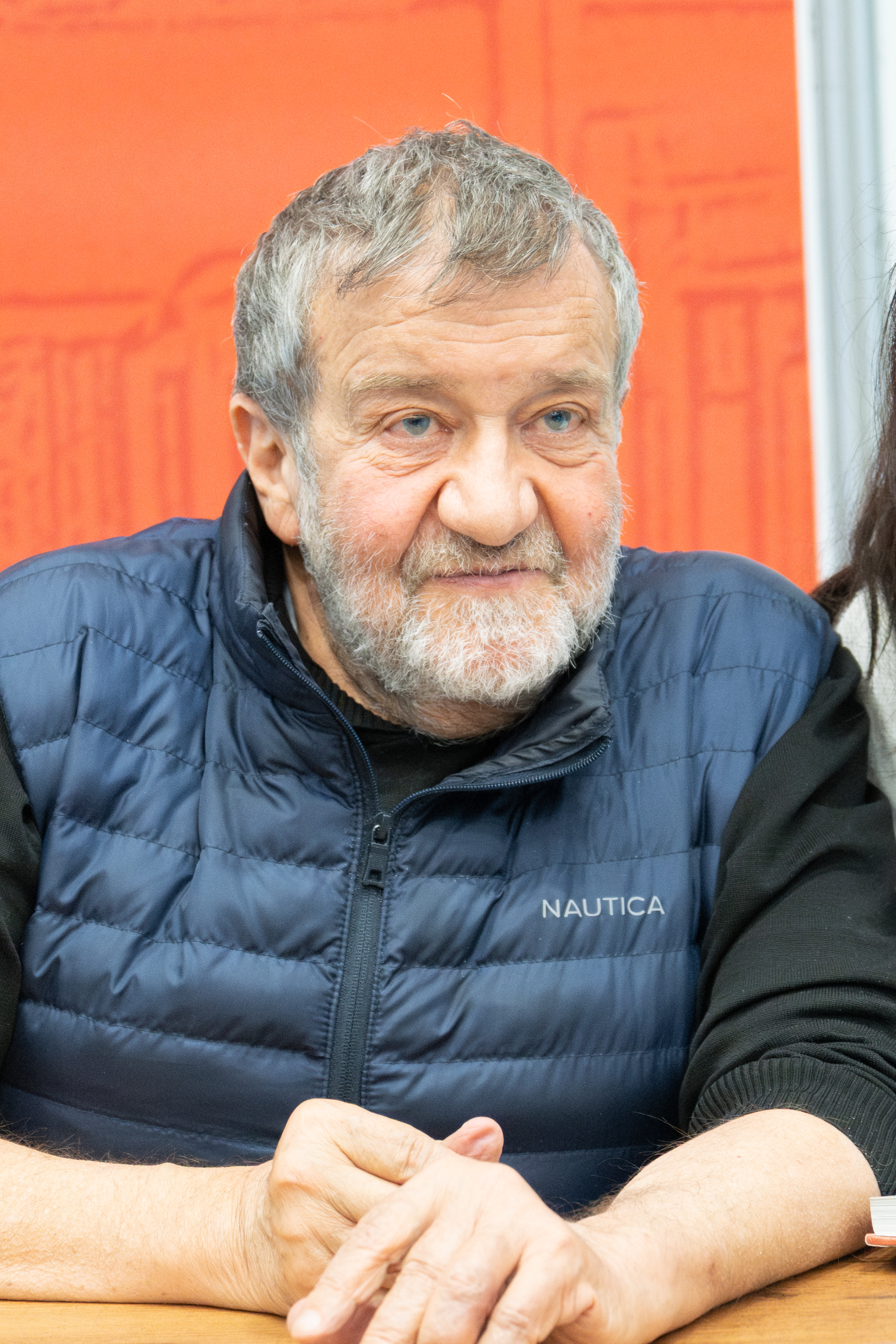
- Coşkun Aral, 2025
- Born: May 1, 1956 (age 70); Siirt, Turkey
- Occupations: War correspondent, photojournalist, television journalist, documentary film producer
- Spouse: Müge Aral
- Children: 1
- Website: haberci.com

Coşkun Aral (born May 1, 1956) is a Turkish war correspondent, photojournalist, television journalist and documentary film producer.

== Life and work ==
Aral was born on May 1, 1956, in Siirt, Turkey. Aral finished secondary school and high school in Istanbul. In 1974, he began his photojournalism career with the newspapers Günaydın and Gün. He transferred to the daily Ekonomi ve Politika in 1976.

Aral gained recognition by the international press with the photos he shot during the Taksim Square massacre incident that occurred on May 1, 1977, the Labour Day in Istanbul. His photos were distributed by the French photo agency Sipa Press and published in the news magazines Time and Newsweek. He became then the Turkish correspondent of the agency while he was serving for the Turkish News Agency and the newspapers Milliyet and Hürriyet as a freelance photographer.

In 1980, Coşkun Aral was tasked by the Sipa Press for the first time abroad Turkey. From then on, he continuously worked in the most conflict-ridden parts of the world, such as Lebanon, Iran, Iraq, Afghanistan, Northern Ireland, Chad and Far East. The world's first ever interview with terrorists who hijacked a Turkish Airlines airliner on October 14, 1980, on board, brought him domestic and international recognition and awards. He covered the 1982 anti-government street demonstrations in Gdańsk, Poland, organized by underground Solidarity. Aral was also assigned to Iran and Iraq to take photos during the Iran–Iraq War in 1982. Archived photos of him showing the political violence in Turkey before the 1980 Turkish coup d'état were published on the cover of Newsweek as well as L'Express and many other news magazines. He continued his profession as a photojournalist, serving the weeklies Time, Newsweek, Paris Match, Stern and Época.

In 1986, Coşkun Aral entered additionally into a career as a television war correspondent, taking part in the news show of 32. Gün (The 32nd Day) by Mehmet Ali Birand. The news show Haberci (The Reporter), he produces and directs, broadcasts in Turkish and also on international television channels. He is co-founder and the director general of Turkey's first documentary and travel channel İZ TV. Aral continues to film documentaries around the world. Aral exhibited his photos and collected some of them in books published internationally.

Coşkun Aral is married to Müge Aral. The couple has a daughter named Deniz.
