= Lubin Historical Museum =

City museum in Lubin, Poland

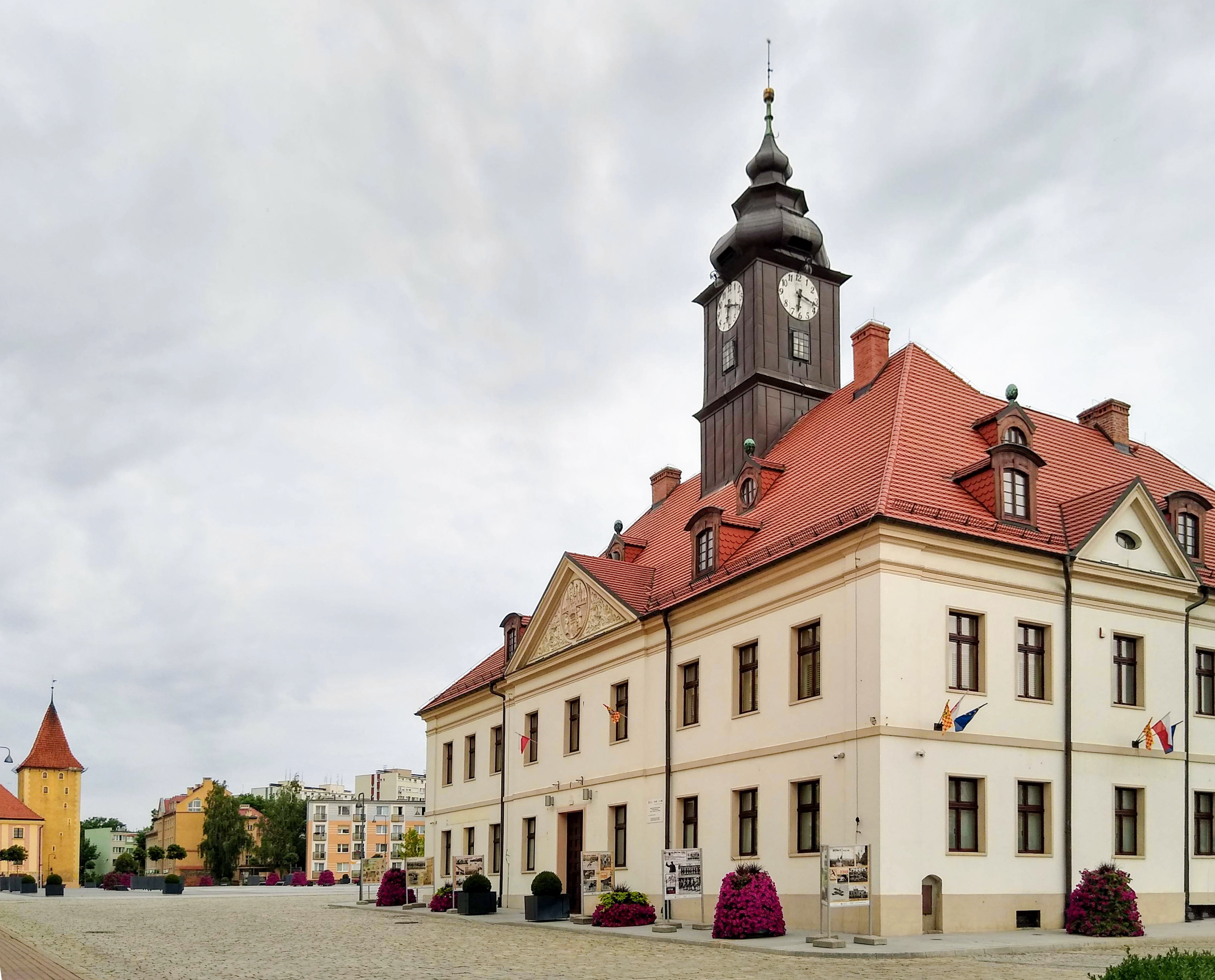
- Established: 2016
- Location: Lubin, Poland
- Coordinates: 51°23′50″N 16°12′22″E
- Type: History
- Website: muzeum-lubin.pl

The Lubin Historical Museum is a local museum in the town of Lubin, Poland. It presents, in particular, Lubin's recent history. It is a local government cultural institution, established in 2016, and opened to the public on 17 May 2018. It is located in the historic town hall and in the Forest Park (Park Leśny)

The institution documents the intense period of Lubin's development in the second half of the 20th century, presents the history of the Great War and World War II, and conducts exhibition, publishing, educational, scientific and cultural activities.

== History ==
The Lubin Historical Museum was established by a resolution of the Lubin City Council on May 31, 2016 and officially opened on May 17, 2018. It functions as part of the Municipality of Lubin. It currently has two locations. The main branch is located in the renovated building of the town hall, the open-air part - Forest Park (Park Leśny) - is located at 9 Kwiatowa St. Initially, the museum also operated on the grounds of the Cultural Centre "Wzgórze Zamkowe" (Mikołaja Pruzi Street 7,9). During a session on 12 February 2019, Lubin councillors decided to merge the two institutions as of 1 April 2019. Visits to the museum and admission to the Forest Park are free.

== Infopoint ==
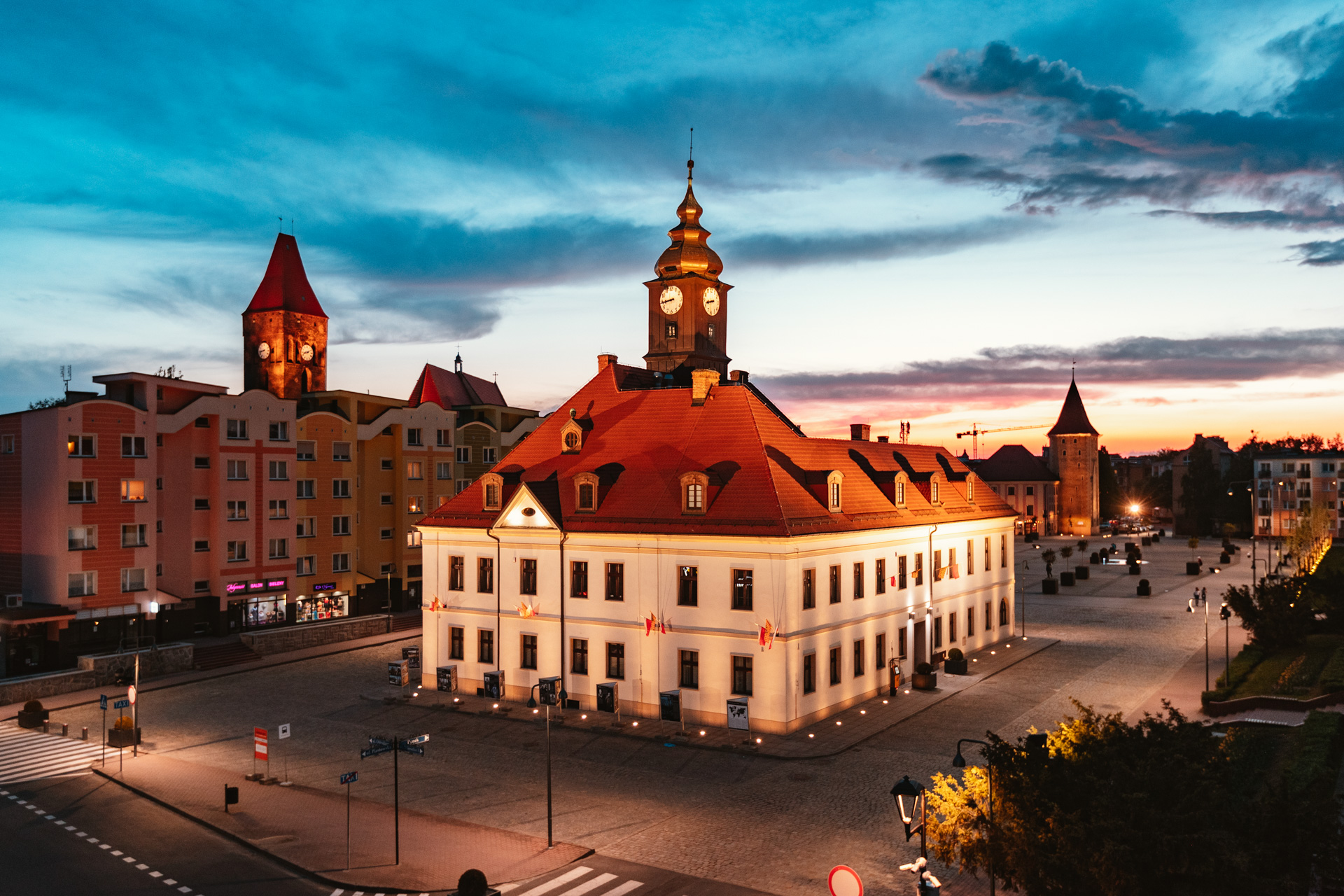
General view

Situated on the first floor from the west side, it is the first stage of touring the museum. It is an information point, a museum store, as well as a press reading room where, apart from daily and weekly newspapers, specialist magazines are available.

== Exhibition ==
The town hall houses permanent exhibitions that present the history of the city and the region in a form of a narrative. In the exhibition rooms (on the first floor and the attic) both original exhibits, as well as replicas and reproductions, are presented, allowing for direct contact with the objects and individual involvement in the tour. The idea behind this kind of presentation is to create a space not only for passive viewing, but also active participation and interaction with the presented content. Modern audiovisual solutions, such as films, excerpts from radio broadcasts, sound effects and educational touch screens, also serve this purpose. In addition to the permanent exhibition, the museum presents thematic temporary exhibitions.

== Permanent exhibitions ==
=== History of the city on the background of everyday life ===
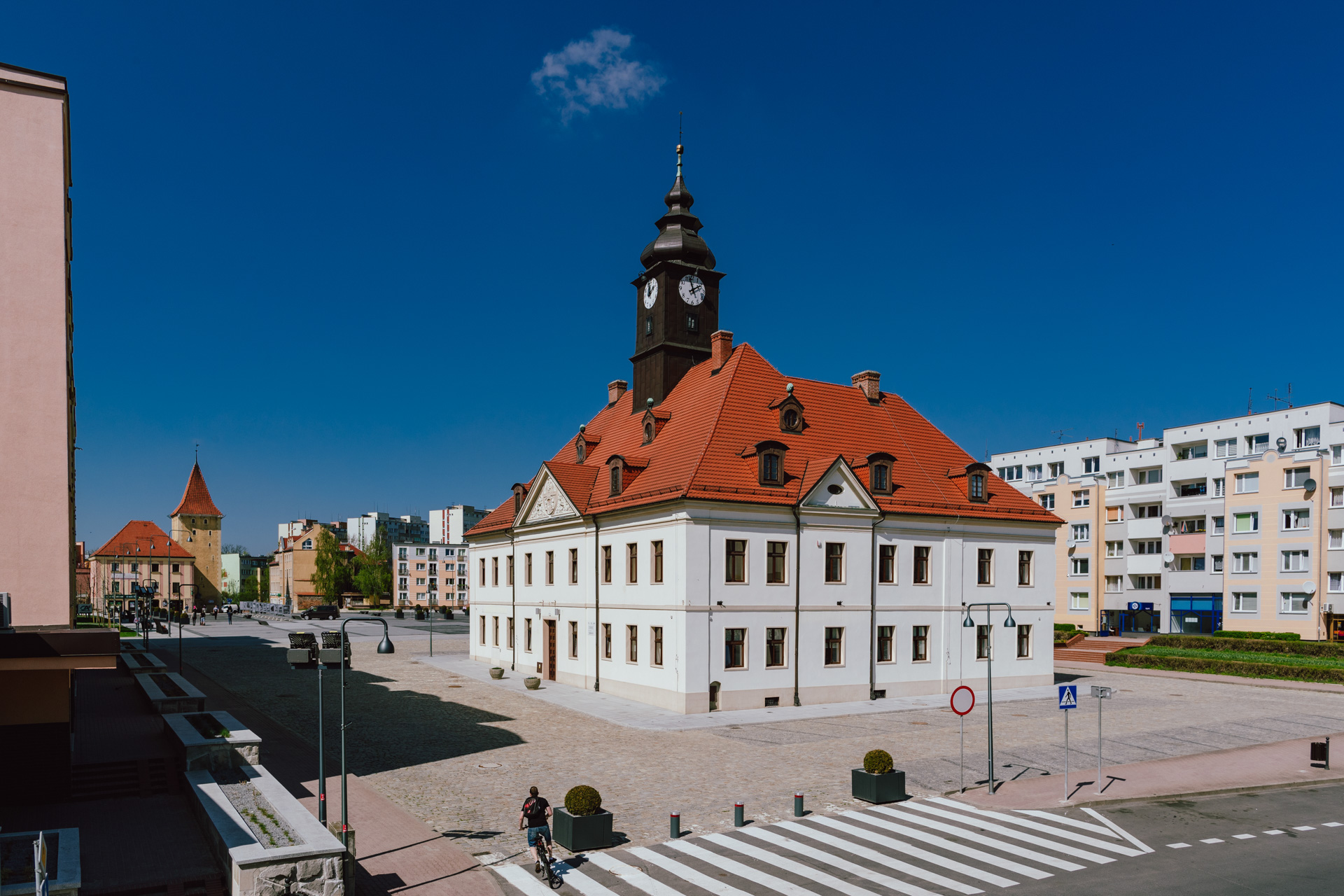
Lubin Town Hall, seat of the institution

One of the two main exhibitions of the Historical Museum in Lubin is entitled "History of the town on the background of everyday life" (pol. Historia miasta na tle życia codziennego). In the space stylized as a miner's family apartment one can see what conditions the citizens of Lubin lived in during the 1950s, 1960s, 1970s and 1980s. The multimedia exhibition combines authentic household equipment from the Gierek era with modern means of presentation of film, photographs and audio clips. Each of the four rooms presents one decade from the period when Lubin was becoming a thriving city. The atmosphere of the PRL era is generated by archival films, photographs, original furniture and everyday appliances, such as "relaksy" shoes, decorative crystal, Frania washing machine, TV sets, or the first computer. Nowadays, authentic antique radios are used to play interviews with people known to the younger generation only from books and history lessons. These are, for example, interviews with Jan Wyżykowski, people who came to the capital of Polish Copper in search of work, or Edward Gierek visiting the Copper Belt, the First Secretary of the Central Committee of the Polish United Workers' Party, who ruled Poland in 1970–1980. An interesting item is the first "Maluch", i.e. Fiat 126p. The entire collection is complemented by photographs taken by amateur photographers: Krzysztof Raczkowiak, Kazimierz Bełz and Jerzy Kosiński.

=== The Lubin Massacre ===
The second main exhibition is devoted to the Lubin Massacre, the tragic events of August 31, 1982, when three miners were killed by police bullets: Michał Adamowicz, Mieczysław Poźniak and Stanisław Trajkowski. The modern, multimedia exhibition is a tribute to those murdered and a lesson on contemporary Lubin history for the living. Original documents and, first of all, photographs by Krzysztof Raczkowiak and Ryszard Bober show the course of one of the most tragic days in the post-war history of the town. Large-format prints, multimedia screenings, archival documents, recordings and sound effects (shouts of demonstrators, the sound of gunfire) convey the atmosphere of the memorable 31 August 1982.

=== Lower Silesian cartography ===
Large-format reproductions of historical maps can be found in the lobby of the town hall. The set consists of cartographic works showing the Lower Silesia region, as well as the Lubin region in more detail. The oldest presented map was drawn in 1609 in Antwerp, the most recent - map of the Lubin district was published in 1831 in Wroclaw. It is a permanent exposition.

=== Sport in Lubin ===
In the connecting passage, archival photographs depicting sporting events in Lubin in the 1970s are presented. The author of the photographs is Krzysztof Raczkowiak. Visitors can also find trophies, souvenirs and contemporary photos documenting the achievements of sportsmen from Lubin.

=== Culture in Lubin ===
The attic contains a collection of posters and photos documenting selected cultural events taking place in Lubin in the first and second decade of the 21st century. Also presented are Lubin music publishers (records) of local bands.
