= 2020 Piacenza scandal =

The 2020 Piacenza scandal was a case that sparked concern in Italy, after seven Carabinieri were arrested in Piacenza for a series of crimes, including drug trafficking and torture.

== History ==
On 22 July 2020 in Piacenza, seven Carabinieri were arrested after being accused of drug trafficking, receiving stolen goods, extortion, illegal arrest, torture, grievous bodily harm, embezzlement, abuse of office and fraud; the seven were later charged of their crimes. The "leader" of the group, Officer Montella, arrested and charged people using planted evidence of crimes that the detainees never committed, placing drugs he had smuggled in the pockets of the people in custody. In one case, a Moroccan man was illegally arrested by the seven officers; the man accused Montella of punching him several times while in custody and reported that the officer laughed during the torture. Montella later admitted that he carried out the torture, after initially trying to accuse only his colleagues. However, many other cases of torture inside the police station and outside during arrests were also reported, as that of a Nigerian man who was approached by Montella; a photo of the man was taken during the arrest, showing him covered with blood. Montella was quoted as saying that the man "had a fall" during the arrest; however, prosecutors did not believe Montella's version of events. A Brazilian woman accused Marshal Orlando, one of the charged officers, of using blackmail and intimidation to force her to have sex with him, as the Marshal threatened to send her to Brazil. The woman was also beat at the police station by Orlando; she reported that the seven officers consumed cocaine inside the police station several times, and orgies with prostitutes happened there; Orlando was the one who carried the drugs inside the station. Several prostitutes were beaten and threatened by the officers.
