= Sözcü =

Turkish daily newspaper

- Type: Daily newspaper
- Format: Berliner
- Owner: Estetik Publishing A.Ş.
- Founded: 27 June 2007
- Political alignment: Kemalism; Secularism
- Language: Turkish
- Headquarters: Halkalı, Küçükçekmece
- City: Istanbul
- Country: Turkey
- Circulation: 305,368
- Sister newspapers: Korkusuz; AMK
- Website: www.sozcu.com.tr

Sözcü (English: Spokesperson) is a popular Turkish daily newspaper. Sözcü was first published on 27 June 2007 by Burak Akbay and is distributed nationwide. As of June 2018, it was one of the top-selling newspapers in Turkey, with around 300,000 copies sold daily. In 2026 the Turkish government took control over Sözcü's website and Sözcü TV, leaving the country with no mainstream opposition TV.

== Overview ==
The origins of Sözcü trace back to Gözcü (“Observer”), a daily newspaper published by the Doğan Media Group beginning on 15 May 1996. Gözcü ceased publication on 1 April 2007. Shortly thereafter, a group of journalists associated with the paper relaunched it under the name Sözcü in 2007. In its early period, the newspaper sold approximately 60,000 copies. By September 2008, its average circulation had reportedly risen to around 150,000, and by December 2010 it had exceeded 200,000 copies, becoming one of Turkey’s highest-selling dailies.

Amid increasing political polarisation during the 2010s, Sözcü consolidated its position as one of the country’s top-selling newspapers through its strongly critical stance toward the ruling Justice and Development Party (AKP) and President Recep Tayyip Erdoğan. It is widely regarded as the highest-selling Turkish daily that consistently and openly criticises the government. Editorially, Sözcü is generally associated with a Kemalist and nationalist orientation, distinguishing it from other opposition newspapers such as Cumhuriyet and BirGün.

In addition to its print edition, Sözcü has developed a strong digital presence through its website, Sözcü.com.tr, which ranks among the most-visited news portals in Turkey. The paper also publishes a European edition aimed at the Turkish diaspora, printed in Germany.

The newspaper has faced legal pressure. In 2017, several executives and columnists were detained and later prosecuted on charges of aiding a terrorist organisation, in connection with alleged links to the Gülen movement. Press freedom organisations criticised the case as part of a broader crackdown on critical media following the 2016 Turkish coup d'état attempt. In subsequent appeals, some sentences were reduced or overturned.

In November 2026, police raided the headquarters of Sözcü TV, detaining executives including its board chairwoman. Sözcü TV and Sözcü's news website were put under Savings Deposit Insurance Fund trusteeship. With Halk TV taken over the month before, this left no mainstream opposition TV in the country. Sözcü was the sixth major outlet to be put under trusteeship since 2022. According to Balkan Insight, Sözcü TV "is expected to resume broadcasting under its new management, initially carrying news but excluding its regular programmes and commentary, aligning its tone to state-run new agencies."

== Korkusuz ==
Another daily newspaper called Korkusuz (English: Fearless) has been published by the Sözcü Group since November 2014.

== AMK ==
The daily sports newspaper AMK has been published by the Sözcü Group since June 2012. The name AMK is officially an acronym of Açık Mert Korkusuz (translated: Open, Valiant and Fearless) but this evoked some controversy, as the acronym is commonly understood to mean a profane phrase in Turkish. On 5 January 2019, the newspaper ceased to be published.

== Sözcü TV ==
Sözcü TV, often shortened as SZC TV, began web broadcasting in 2019 and launched on YouTube in 2021. The channel acquired Sivas SRT’s licence in 2020 but faced delays in RTÜK’s logo approval, which was granted in July 2021. Test broadcasts began the same month, and the channel officially launched on 1 March 2023.

On 8 July 2025, Sözcü TV was subjected to a 10-day broadcast blackout by the Radio and Television Supreme Council (RTÜK). Critics argued that the ban was a result of the channel’s extensive coverage of the Anti-Government Protests and its opposition reporting.

The channel resumed broadcasting after the ban ended.

== 2026 police raid ==
Early on 17 November, 2026 police surrounded Sözcü TV Group headquarters in Istanbul under a court order and counterterrorism teams were reported to take part. The Istanbul 4th Criminal Judgeship of Peace appointed the Savings Deposit Insurance Fund (TMSF) as trustee of Mega Ajans ve Reklamcılık Ticaret AŞ, a company linked to the group. The trusteeship covers Sözcü TV and the sozcu.com.tr website, but not the newspaper itself nor Tavır or Korkusuz, the group's other titles. Journalists said they were not allowed to enter the newsroom. News broadcasters were suspended after the trustee took control of the channel's programing.

The Istanbul Chief Public Prosecutor's Office said the investigation concerned alleged membership of the Gülen movement, terrorism financing establishing or managing a terrorist organisation and spreading terrorist propaganda. It centered on the owner Burak Akbay, whom prosecutor accused of financing Estetik Yayıncılık and Mega Ajans through overseas bank accounts citing reports of the Financial Crimes Investigation Board (MASAK). Prosecutors linked the case to an investigation opened in 2016 and to a 2017 indictment of Akbay and said the new inquiry began after the court hearing that case referred it for a financial assessment. Orders of search, seizure and arrests of were issued and Turkish media reported that board chair Funda Tuncer Sıdalı and Asım Akgül, a former general manager at Sözcü TV were among those detained. The group's lawyer Ersan Barkın said, the operation rested on a case the Court of Cassation overturned finding no crime. The court had quashed the 2019 convictions of Sözcü staff in November 2024 and the defendants were acquitted on retrial on March 2025. Sözcü TV resumed broadcasting at midday under the trustee management.

The raid came about a month after police raided Halk TV and installed a administrator there. The opposition leader Özgür Özel criticised the operation and İYİ Party leader Müsavat Dervişoğlu called it a "coup against democracy".

== Contributors (past and present) ==
- Rahmi Turan
- Uğur Dündar
- Emin Çölaşan
- Mehmet Türker
- Güney Öztürk
- Yekta Güngör Özden
- Kadri Yamaç
- Saygı Öztürk
- Ayşe Sucu
- Soner Yalçın
- Bekir Coşkun
- Yılmaz Özdil
