= Derya Akkaynak =

Turkish mechanical engineer and oceanographer

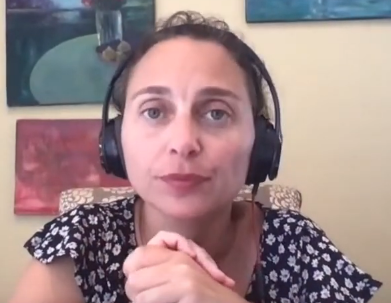
- Akkaynak in 2021
- Education: Massachusetts Institute of Technology (MSc, PhD); Middle East Technical University (BSc)
- Scientific career
- Institutions: Harbor Branch Oceanographic Institution; Princeton University; University of Haifa; Smithsonian Tropical Research Institute
- Thesis: A computational approach to the quantification of animal camouflage (2014)
- Website: Akkaynak's website

Derya Akkaynak is a Turkish mechanical engineer and oceanographer at the Harbor Branch Oceanographic Institute. She was a 2019 finalist for the Blavatnik Awards for Young Scientists.

== Early life and education ==
Akkaynak is from the Aegean coast of Turkey. After completing her primary and secondary education at TED Ankara College and graduating in 1998, she studied aerospace engineering at the Middle East Technical University, where she graduated top of her class in 2003. She moved to the United States after graduating, where she earned a master's degree in Aeronautics at the Massachusetts Institute of Technology in 2005. Her Master's dissertation involved investigations into fuel cells for the improvement of on-site emergency power availability in nuclear power plants. After graduating Akkaynak worked as a consultant in risk analysis. She decided to return to school, and started a doctoral degree in oceanography at the Woods Hole Oceanographic Institution. For her doctoral work, Akkaynak worked on computational methods to model the camouflage of cephalopods under the supervision of Ruth Rosenholtz and Roger Hanlon. She developed a means to calibrate and correct underwater colour, introduced an equation that could quantify the spectral contamination, used in situ spectrometry to colour match cuttlefish to their background and created a new computational approach to quantify patterns. In 2011 Akkaynak founded Divers4Oceanography, a citizen science project that collects ocean temperature data from divers all around the world. She worked at the Smithsonian Tropical Research Institute throughout 2015.

== Research and career ==
After completing a short term fellowship in Panama, Akkaynak moved to the University of Haifa. She was appointed a postdoctoral fellow at Princeton University in 2018, before joining Harbor Branch Oceanographic Institute as an engineer in 2019.

Underwater photography is often compromised by dull and incorrect colours. Akkaynak developed Sea-thru, an algorithm that can remove the artefacts and distortions that occur in underwater imagery. Sea-thru accounts for differences in underwater and atmospheric light scattering and absorption, reversing water-based image distortion, as well as accommodating for the spectral sensitivity of underwater cameras. To perform the corrections, Sea-thru requires multiple RAW images of the same scene from a variety of angles, which it uses to estimate the distance between the camera and the object being imaged.

In 2019 Akkaynak was named a finalist for the Blavatnik Awards for Young Scientists for "significant breakthroughs and advancements in computer vision and underwater imaging technologies". She is the first Turkish scientist to receive this award. She was also awarded the 2019 Award in Science Photography by the Art of Photography Federation of Turkey.

== Personal life ==
Akkaynak is a Professional Association of Diving Instructors certified divemaster and ice diver. She dives for the American Academy of Underwater Sciences. She has led underwater fieldwork in the Bering Sea, Caribbean, Red Sea and her home ocean, the Aegean Sea.
