= Soner Yalçın =

Turkish journalist and writer (born 1966)

Hüseyin Soner Yalçın
- Born: January 1, 1966 (age 60); Çorum, Turkey
- Citizenship: Turkey
- Education: Hacettepe University
- Occupations: Journalist, Writer

Soner Yalçın (born January 1, 1966) is a Turkish journalist and writer. The co-founder of the news website odatv, he was arrested in February 2011 along with other odatv journalists and charged with links to the Ergenekon organization. He was released pending trial in December 2012.

== Career ==
Soner Yalçın is an investigative journalist specialized in reporting about the deep state in Turkey. He began working in 1987 for the center left-wing periodical called 2000'e Doğru ("Towards 2000") as a permanent political correspondent in Ankara. In 1990, he was appointed as the chief of intelligence reporting of the newspaper. From 1993 to 1994, he worked as news director for the daily Aydınlık (Enlightenment). After the split of the Aydınlık group, the forced ban during the 1980 Turkish coup d'état, Aydınlık was relaunched as a left-wing daily in 1990 not only supported by the Workers' Party (İşçi Partisi) but also by intellectuals and writers who were not affiliated with the party. Like others, Soner Yalçın working for Aydınlık was considered at that time part of a broader project, and he was not a member of this party. He left this newspaper in 1995. Aydınlık is now the official newspaper of the Patriotic Party (Vatan Partisi).

Following that, Soner Yalçın briefly worked for the newspaper Siyah – Beyaz (Black - White) published by Doğan Yurdakul before starting a new career in television in 1996 for Show TV. He began as a television investigative reporter based in Ankara. The same year, he was hired by Star TV where he worked as the general news manager. Later CNN Türk asked Soner Yalçın and Cüneyt Özdemir to prepare a new television program called 5N1K. With journalist Barış Pehlivan, Soner Yalçın produced a number of political documentaries called Oradaydim ("I was there") broadcast by CNN Türk. On February 4, 2007, he started working as a columnist for the Sunday editions of the daily Hürriyet. Later in 2007, he launched his own online news website called OdaTV.

Besides his journalistic activities, Soner Yalçın is also a prominent and popular writer. He wrote several critical essays and investigation about the controversial role of Turkish governmental intelligence organization, the existence of a Turkish branch of Operation Gladio, the Counter-Guerrilla, the relations between the Turkish mafia and state officials, the tactics and the networks of global Islamist movements (especially the US network of the Gülen movement) and some historical analysis about the Turkish-Ottoman identity. In his writings, he tends to explain to the reader that reality is usually not as it appears, that the truth is sometimes hidden and a conscientious reader should look for it.

Written in prison, his last publication Samizdat (2012) is about the freedom of the press and the freedom of expression in Turkey. Contextually, it starts from his first 29 days in prison and ends with his 395th day, giving extensive details about his own bill of indictment, explaining the situation for other Ergenekon detainees and criticizing the role of mainstream media.

== OdaTV case ==
Yalçın co-founded the news website odatv in 2007. He was arrested in February 2011 along with other odatv journalists and charged with links to the Ergenekon organization. He was released pending trial in December 2012.

According to the prosecution, Soner Yalçın is a leading member of this clandestine terrorist organization which was allegedly preparing a Turkish secularist military coup against the current Turkish government. According to the arrested journalist, a pro-Gülen movement clandestine network within the Turkish police hacked his computer and falsified the documents in order to put in jail him and his colleagues working for OdaTV.

== Bibliography ==
in Turkish

- Samizdat Hakikatlere Dayanacak Gücünüz Var mi. Kirmizi Kedi Yayinlari, Istanbul 2012, ISBN 978-605534033-9.
- Bu Dinciler O Müslümanlara Benzemiyor. Doğan Kitapçılık, İstanbul 2009, ISBN 978-605111400-2.
- Siz Kimi Kandırıyorsunuz! Doğan Kitapçılık, İstanbul 2008, ISBN 978-975-991-709-8.
- Efendi 2: Beyaz Müslümanların Büyük Sırrı. Doğan Kitapçılık, İstanbul 2006
- Efendi: Beyaz Türklerin Büyük Sırrı. Doğan Kitapçılık, İstanbul 2004, ISBN 975-293-203-7.
- Behçet Cantürk'ün Anıları. Doğan Kitapçılık, İstanbul 2003, ISBN 975-293-117-0. - on Behçet Cantürk
- (with Doğan Yurdakul) Reis - Gladio'nun Türk tetikçisi. Doğan Kitapçılık, İstanbul 2003, ISBN 975-293-093-X. - on Abdullah Çatlı
- Binbaşı Ersever'in İtirafları. Doğan Kitapçılık, İstanbul 2003, ISBN 975-293-129-4. - on the assassination of Ahmet Cem Ersever
- (with Mehmet Ali Birand) The Özal: Bir Davanın Öyküsü. Doğan Kitapçılık, İstanbul 2001, ISBN 975-6719-90-7. - on the life and death of Turgut Özal, and related history
- Teşkilat'ın İki Silahşoru - Biri Meşrutiyet'in Silahşoru Dede Yakub Cemil Diğeri Cumhuriyet'in Silahşoru Torun "Yakub Cemil". Doğan Kitapçılık, İstanbul 2001, ISBN 975-991-432-8.
- (with Doğan Yurdakul) Bay Pipo - Bir MİT Görevlisinin Sıradışı Yaşamı: Hiram Abas Doğan Kitapçılık, İstanbul 1999, ISBN 975-991-430-1. - on Hiram Abas
- Hangi Erbakan? Doğan Kitapçılık, Öteki Yayınevi, Ankara 1996, ISBN 975-8012-20-7.
- Kayıp Sicil - Erdogan Erdoğan'ın Çalınan Dosyası Kirmizi Kedi, Istanbul 2014 ISBN 9786054927401.

== See also ==
- List of arrested journalists in Turkey
