= Hikmet Bilâ =

Turkish journalist, columnist and writer

- Born: 1954; Zonguldak, Turkey
- Died: 21 October 2011 (aged 57); Ankara, Turkey
- Education: Ankara University, Faculty of Political Sciences
- Occupations: Journalist, columnist, author
- Years active: 1973–2011
- Spouse: Gülde Bilâ
- Relatives: Fikret Bilâ (brother)

Hikmet Bilâ (pronounced [hicˈmet ˈbilaː]; 1954 – 21 October 2011) was a Turkish journalist and columnist. He was the author of three books about Turkish political history.

== Biography ==
He was born in Zonguldak in 1954. After graduating from high school, he was admitted to Ankara University, Faculty of Political Sciences and earned his B.A. degree from the international relations department.

Hikmet Bilâ started his journalism career in the daily newspaper Yeni Ulus in 1973. He wrote columns in several Turkish newspapers including Milliyet, Cumhuriyet, and Vatan. He worked as editor-in-chief at a leading Turkish news channel, NTV.

He died on 21 October 2011 in his Ankara home after suffering for 1,5 years from lung cancer. His funeral was held at Teşvikiye Mosque and buried in Ulus Cemetery on 22 October 2011.

His brother Fikret Bilâ wrote a sad and mournful article about Hikmet Bilâ after the funeral.

== Books ==
- Sosyal Demokrat Süreç İçinde CHP ve Sonrası, Milliyet Yayınları (1987), 560pp.
- 12 Eylül: Türkiye'nin Miladı, Doğan Kitap (2002), 239pp, ISBN 975-6817-03-8, (with Mehmet Ali Birand and Rıdvan Akar).
- CHP 1919-2009, Doğan Kitap (2008), 472pp, ISBN 978-605-111-003-5.
