= Yurdakul =

Yurdakul (IPA: [juɾdaˈkul], literally "servant of the homeland") is a Turkish surname and may refer to:

- Cevat Yurdakul (1942–1979), Turkish prosecutor
- Doğan Yurdakul (1946–2017), Turkish journalist and writer
- Mehmet Emin Yurdakul (1869–1944), Turkish nationalist writer and politician, member of Turkish volleyball league.
