= Rıdvan Akar =

Turkish journalist and author (born 1961)

- Born: 1961 (age 64–65); Zara, Sivas, Turkey
- Occupations: Journalist; author

Rıdvan Akar (born 1961) is a Turkish journalist and author. He has contributed to Söz, Ekonomik Panorama, Tempo, Milliyet. He has been editor-in-chief of the news programme 32. Gün (CNN Turk / Kanal D). Together with Hikmet Bila and Mehmet Ali Birand, he has authored five editions of a book on the 1980 Turkish coup d'état. He is known for his work on history, politics and minorities in Turkey; he has also published a novel, Bir Irkçının İhaneti (Betrayal of a Racist, 2002).

Akar was born in Zara, Sivas, in 1961. He graduated from Kabataş High School. He received a degree in finance from Gazi University. Then he obtained his master's degree again in finance from Istanbul University.

== Books ==
- Varlık Vergisi Kanunu: tek parti rejiminde azınlık karşıtı politika örneği (1992). Belge Yayınları
- 12 Eylül: Türkiye'nin miladı (1999, with Hikmet Bila and Mehmet Ali Birand; 5th edition 2006). Doğan Kitap
- Bir Irkçının İhaneti (2006). Doğan Kitap
- Ecevit ve gizli arşivi (2008, with Can Dündar). İmge Kitabevi
- Aşkale Yolcuları (2009). Doğan Kitap
