= TED Ankara College Foundation Schools =

Group of private schools in Turkey

Coordinates: 39.84123°N 32.81891°E

- TED Ankara Koleji Vakfı Okulları

Information
- School type: Private
- Established: 31 January 1928; 98 years ago
- Founder: Mustafa Kemal Atatürk
- Language: English, Turkish
- Sports: TED Ankara Kolejliler

TED Ankara College Foundation Schools is a group of private schools in Turkey. It consists of kindergarten, elementary, middle and high schools. Its İncek Campus, considered sizeable with 141,000 square meters of enclosed and over 309,000 square meters of open area, is located in Ankara, Turkey, and is host to 6,000 students and over 700 teachers and support staff. TED Ankara College delivers both the Turkish curriculum and the International Baccalaureate (IB) in Turkish and English, while French, German and Spanish are taught as additional languages. Entrance is competitive.

== History ==
In line with the directives of Mustafa Kemal Atatürk, the Turkish Education Association (Turkish: Türk Eğitim Derneği, abbreviated TED) was founded in 1928 and led the establishment of qualified Turkish schools.

TED Ankara College was founded in 1930 as the first school established by TED, and was the first private Turkish school instituted after the foundation of Republic of Turkey to instruct in English. In 1931, the primary school, in 1933, the middle school, in 1936 the high school were established. In 1963, the school's administration was handed over to the TED Ankara College Foundation. In 2000, the foundation started the construction of the campus in İncek. In 2003-2004 the establishments were moved from the Kolej district, which was named after the College, to İncek and the old buildings were later reutilized as a new university.

The logo of the schools is derived from the emblem of the TED association.

== Notable alumni ==
As one of the oldest schools founded after the birth of the modern Turkish Republic, TED Ankara College has over 35,000 alumni. Some of the notable alumni are listed below in alphabetical order of family names.

- Muazzez Abacı, singer
- Filiz Akın (1960), actress
- Derya Akkaynak, oceanographer
- Mustafa Altıoklar, film director, producer and screenwriter
- Oğuz Atay, author, pioneer of novel writing in Turkey
- Ali Babacan (1985), politician, former Minister of Economics, Minister of Foreign Affairs
- Nilüfer Bayar Gürsoy (1939), daughter of former President of Turkey, Celâl Bayar, politician, memoirist
- Mithat Bereket (1966), journalist
- Hüsamettin Cindoruk, politician, former Speaker of the Parliament of Turkey
- Emin Çölaşan, journalist
- Ali Doğramacı, former president of Bilkent University
- Timuçin Esen, actor
- Erol Gelenbe (1962), Turkish-French computer scientist
- Faruk Gül, Turkish-American economicst and academic at Princeton University
- Ataç İmamoğlu (1981), Turkish-Swiss physicist working on quantum optics and quantum computation
- Tamer Karadağlı, actor
- Nur Koçak, contemporary feminist artist
- Zülfü Livaneli, musician
- Reha Muhtar, anchorman
- Aras Onur (2006), author and poet
- Hasan Piker, political commentator
- Beren Saat (2002), actress
- Güler Sabancı (1955), chairwoman of Sabancı Holding
- Oktay Sinanoğlu, physical chemist and molecular biophysicist
- Demir Demirkan, musician
- Kartal Tibet, actor
- Alper Uçar (2003), Turkey's first Olympian, along with partner Alisa Agafonova, in ice dance
- Murat Vargı, founder of Turkcell

== See also ==
- Turkish Education Association
- TED Ankara Kolejliler
- List of high schools in Turkey
