= Barış Pehlivan =

Turkish journalist and author (born 1983)

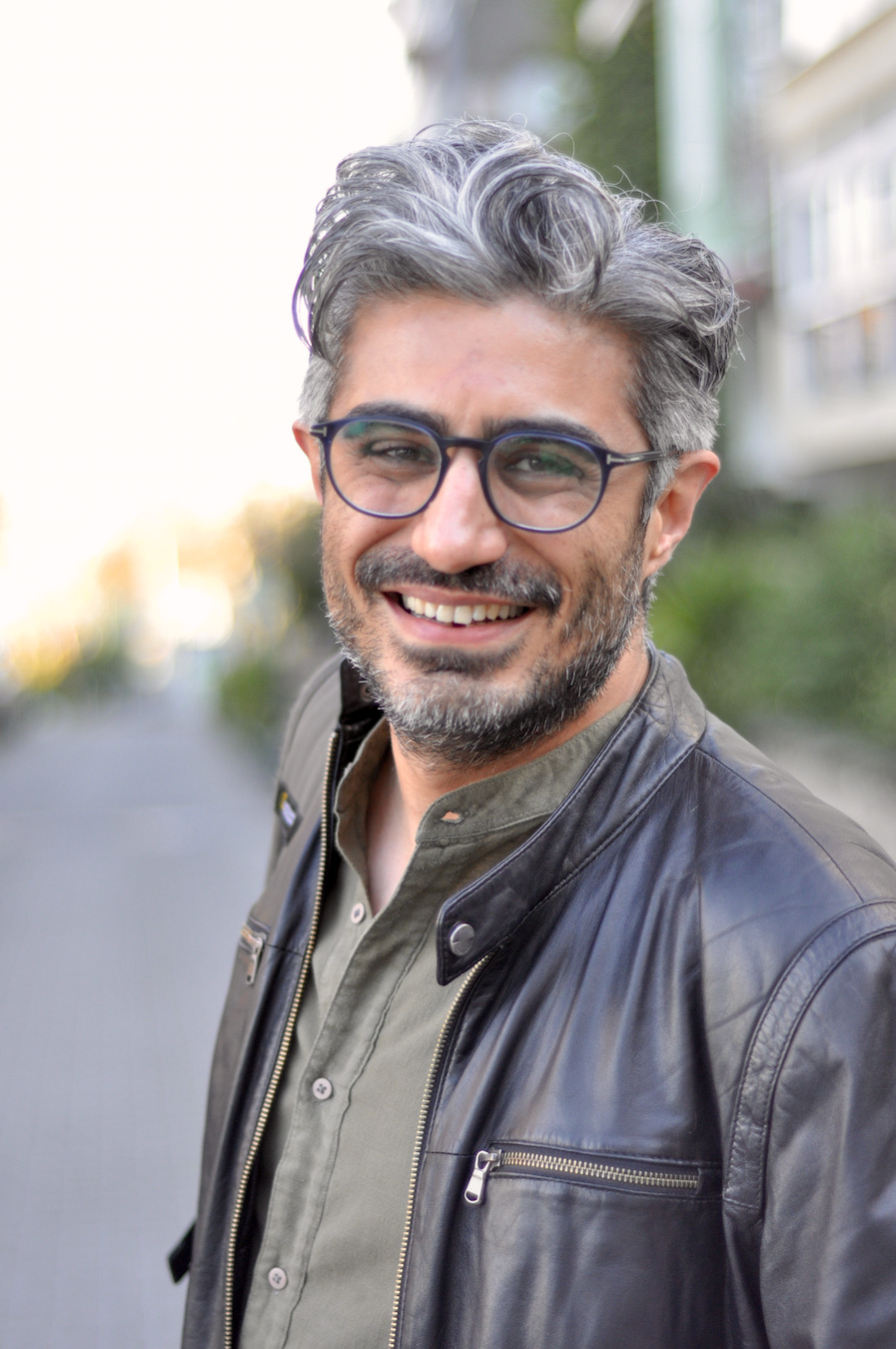
- Born: July 10, 1983 (age 42); Istanbul
- Education: B.A. in Journalism, Istanbul University
- Occupation: Journalist

Barış Pehlivan (IPA: [baɾɯʃ pehlivan]; born July 10, 1983) is a Turkish journalist and author. He is known for his investigative news and books on Turkish politics. He has been sued many times for his journalistic activities. He was imprisoned in 2011, 2020 and 2023 as part of these cases.

== Biography ==
Barış Pehlivan graduated from Istanbul University, Faculty of Communication, Department of Journalism.

In 2004, Barış Pehlivan worked as a reporter at Kaçak Yayın Dergisi, an art magazine owned by the Leman Group. He worked as a project assistant, director’s assistant, and publisher respectively in the documentary programs named ‘Paranın Seyir Defteri’, ‘Şair Ceketli Çocuk: Kazım Koyuncu’, and ‘Nohut Oda Bakla Sofa’. He contributed to the program 5N1K with the stories ‘Land Sales to Foreigners’ and ‘Assassination of Shah Massoud’. Since 2007, Pehlivan is working as the executive editor for the online news website called OdaTV.com, founded by the investigative journalist Soner Yalçın. He worked as a columnist in Karşı newspaper. He has faced many trials and has been imprisoned due to his news and books.

He was awarded with Turkey's most important journalism awards. He is a board member of Nazım Hikmet Culture and Art Foundation. He has been the editor-in-chief of Odatv.com news site between 2007 and 2020.

Barış Pehlivan produced the political documentary Oradaydım for CNN Türk TV channel between the years 2005 and 2010. The series explain the stories of more than 250 events related to recent Turkish history.

Pehlivan co-authored three investigation books Sızıntı: Wikileaks’te Ünlü Türkler (The Leak: The Popular Turks of Wikileaks), Mahrem, Metastaz and Metastaz 2: Cendere with colleague Barış Terkoğlu. All three books were much debated at the time of their publication and remained on the bestseller list for a long time.

== Trials ==
Throughout his career as a journalist, many lawsuits were filed against him with complaints by high-profile Turks like Recep Tayyip Erdoğan or Fethullah Gülen.

In an episode of “Oradaydım” broadcast on February 24, 2007, the documentary focused on the events of the 12th of September, 1980, in a Diyarbakır prison. Pehlivan was put on trial as a producer and was accused of fomenting public discord. In 2008, he was acquitted.

On February 14, 2011, the Turkish police took Pehlivan into custody following the search of his house and OdaTV office, and accused of being part of the Ergenekon organization - one a substantial number of journalists accused in relation to odatv. He was arrested and kept in detention at Istanbul’s Silivri Prison in connection with his work at odatv, accused of links to the Ergenekon organization. He was not brought before a judge and formally charged until more than nine months after his arrest, on November 22, 2011. In September 2012, he was released pending trial following a judicial report confirming that the evidence collected against the journalist have probably been digitally forged and sent using a trojan horse to infect his computer. Subsequent analysis of Barış Pehlivan’s OdaTV computer by digital forensics company Arsenal Consulting revealed local attacks, which required physical access, were responsible for delivery of the incriminating documents.

In September 2012, he was released pending trial following a judicial report confirming that the evidence collected against the journalist have probably been digitally forged and sent using a trojan horse to infect his computer.

On April 12, 2017, the 18th High Criminal Court acquitted all 13 defendants of the Odatv Case. The court also ruled for a criminal complaint be filed against those who set up the Odatv plot. It turned out that this operation against Oda TV was a conspiracy and carried out by FETÖ members infiltrated into the state. A lawsuit was filed against the police, prosecutors and judges who kept innocent journalists in prison.

On March 3, 2020, an investigation has been initiated against him due to a news published in Odatv about the funeral of the martyr of National Intelligence Agency (MIT) in Libya. He was arrested on March 6, 2020, in Istanbul Çağlayan Courthouse, where he went to give his statement. In his defense, he stated that the real reason for his arrest, after 9 years, was his prior and new coming book. The indictment demands a prison sentence up to 19 years for 8 journalists, who were on trial with him.

It turned out that he has been subjected to an assault in Silivri Prison where he was taken after his arrest. After camera footage of the incident was revealed, an investigation was initiated against those responsible.

Due to growing concerns over the spread of coronavirus in the prisons, the Turkish government drafted a law that would release up to 100,000 prisoners. During these discussions in Parliament, lawmakers added an extra article stating that crimes committed involving MIT would effectively be excluded from the scope of the newly minted law; the six journalists were pointedly excluded in the lessening of the prison sentences. Organized crime bosses, convicted murderers and thieves, among other criminals, were freed from prison while journalists, lawyers and bloggers remained behind bars over so-called “terrorism” charges, as violations of the law as it pertains to MIT were removed from the “amnesty” regulation. This "personalized" change created a great public reaction.

Odatv.com, where Barış Pehlivan is the Editor-in-Chief, was blocked by court decision after this new operation. Odatv, that has been Turkey's most influential news site for 13 years, continues its broadcasting through different web addresses.

The first trial of six journalists who reported on the funeral of a National Intelligence Organization (MİT) officer who was killed in Libya was held on 24 June 2020, at İstanbul. Three journalists released, three remain in jail after the trial. After the release of three journalists, Barış Pehlivan and two other colleagues (Murat Agirel and Hülya Kilinç) are kept in pre-trial detention until September 9.

On 14 April 2026, Pehlivan was sentenced to 15 months in prison for "disinformation" by a court in Istanbul over critical comments he made on Halk TV about the Turkish government's relationship with the government of Israel. He remained free pending appeal.

== Bibliography ==
- Sızıntı: Wikileaks’te Ünlü Türkler (2012), co-authored with Barış Terkoğlu, ISBN 978-605-534-018-6.
- Mahrem: Gizli Belgelerde Türkiye'nin Sırları (2015), co-authored with Barış Terkoğlu, ISBN 978-605-990-874-0.
- Metastaz (2019), co-authored with Barış Terkoğlu, ISBN 978-605-298-450-5.

== Awards ==
- Çağdaş Gazeteciler Derneği Rafet Genç News Award 2016
- Yeditepe University Best Breakthrough Book Award 2018
- Turkish Publishers Association 2019 Freedom of Thought and Expression Author Award
- Dil Derneği Emin Özdemir Award 2019
- Çağdaş Gazeteciler Derneği Investigation Research Award 2020
- Halit Çelenk Law Award 2020
- Fikir Kulüpleri Federasyonu Yılın Umut Veren Gazetecilik Ödülü 2020
