= Hiram Abas =

Turkish intelligence official

Hiram Abas (1932 in Istanbul – 26 September 1990) was a Turkish intelligence official in the National Intelligence Organization (MIT). He retired after the 1980 Turkish coup d'état, but returned in August 1986 as deputy to MIT chief Hayri Ündül, retiring again in 1988. He was assassinated on 26 September 1990 by leftwing revolutionary group Dev Sol.

According to an article in the leftist pro-Kurdish Kurtuluş magazine, MIT deputy chief Hiram Abas was present at the 1977 Taksim Square massacre. (Swiss historian Daniele Ganser says that Abas was a CIA agent; the CIA's station chief in Istanbul, Duane Clarridge, spoke glowingly of him.) Hiram Abas had been trained in the US in covert action operations and as an MIT agent first gained notoriety in Beirut, where he co-operated with the Mossad from 1968 to 1971 and carried out attacks, "targeting left-wing youths in the Palestinian camps and receiving bounty for the results he achieved in actions".

According to a column in a daily newspaper Sabah, Abas led a Lebanese unit against the Armenian Secret Army for the Liberation of Armenia, consisting only of MİT operatives and members of the Special Warfare Department (special forces). This information however is never verified nor confirmed.

Doğan Yurdakul and Soner Yalçın produced a biography of Abas, Mr Pipe – an MIT Officer's Unusual Life.

== Books ==
- Doğan Yurdakul and Soner Yalçın (2012), Bay Pipo – Bir MİT Görevlisinin Sıradışı Yaşamı: Hiram Abas, Doğan Kitap. ISBN 9789759914301
