= Doğan Yurdakul =

Turkish journalist and writer

Doğan Yurdakul (1946 – September 3, 2017 in Datça) is a Turkish journalist and writer. He has contributed to newspapers including Vatan, Aydınlık, Evrensel, Siyah-Beyaz, and Günaydın as well as the television news programme 32. Gün. His books include biographies of Turkish intelligence agent Hiram Abas and of Abdullah Çatlı (Reis), both written with Soner Yalçın.

Yurdakul is charged in the Odatv case of the Ergenekon trials; he was the news co-ordinator of odatv. He was arrested in March 2011 and released on health grounds in February 2012. Both of the trials later were dismissed on grounds of judicial irregularities while confirming the evidence presented to be falsified.

== Bibliography ==
- Sırların Kavşağında (2012)
- Abi: "Efsane" (1935–1984) (2007)
- (with Soner Yalçın) Reis – Gladio'nun Türk tetikçisi. Doğan Kitapçılık, İstanbul 2003, ISBN 975-293-093-X.
- ABI: I-Dündar Kiliç ve kabadayılık efsanesi (2001)
- Abi: Raconun son nefesi ve "Mafya" (2002)
- (with Soner Yalçın) Bay Pipo – Bir MİT Görevlisinin Sıradışı Yaşamı: Hiram Abas. Doğan Kitapçılık, İstanbul 1999, ISBN 975-991-430-1.
