= Nihat Genç =

Turkish journalist and writer (1956–2025)

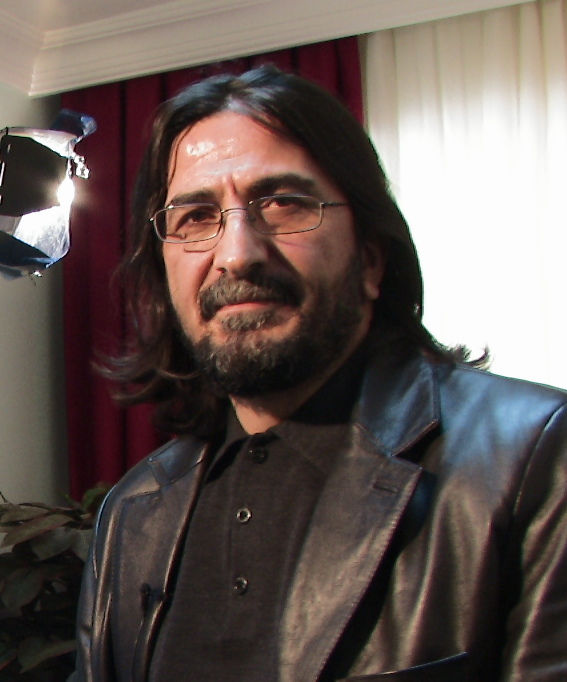
- Genç in 2008
- Born: 1956; Trabzon, Turkey
- Died: 4 July 2025 (aged 69); Yenimahalle, Ankara, Turkey
- Occupations: Writer, journalist
- Years active: 1989–2025

Nihat Genç (1956 – 4 July 2025) was a Turkish journalist and writer.

== Early life and career ==
Genç graduated from Trabzon Commerce School in 1974. Although he entered the Istanbul Academy of Economic and Commercial Sciences and Ankara School of Banking and Insurance, he dropped out of these schools because of political unrest. In 1983, he graduated from Hacettepe University's Department of Health Management. After graduation, he worked in the Ministry of Health's Ankara Rehabilitation Center and the Ministry of Culture.

In his youth, he worked as a technician in newspapers and magazines and eventually started writing in nationalistic publications like Bağımsız and Kırmızı-Beyaz and the humoristic publication Leman and for a short while in Akşam newspaper. In 1989, he co-founded with Hakan Albayrak the Çete magazine. He became well known for his critical thoughts in his column "Bir Soru – Bir Cevap" ("One Question – One Answer"). From 2003 to 2008, he was part of a long television series of interviews as a political commentator in Nihat Genç ile Ne Var Ne Yok? on Sky Türk until 2008. The program was hosted by Serdar Akinan. It was followed by another interview series Nihat Genç ile Veryansın on Avrasya TV between 2008 and 2011 hosted by Lale Şıvgın. In 2012, he appeared in Nihat Genç Ko-nu-şu-yor! on Halk TV and in 2013, in Nihat Genç İle Ver-yansın on Ulusal Kanal. He was known for expressing his opinions during TV programs in an angry and emotional way.

After criticizing the organizers of a 2005 conference about Ottoman Armenians During the Decline of the Ottoman Empire at Sabancı University and Boğaziçi University, his long-time publisher cut ties with him stopping all future publications of his books.

Genç founded the Veryansın TV with his friends and followers. He wrote on the website and made appearances on the Veryansın's YouTube channel.

== Personal life and death ==
Genç was a supporter of Trabzonspor.

Genç died from lung cancer at a hospital where he had been receiving long-term treatment, on 4 July 2025. He was 69.

His death was announced by Erdem Atay, his colleague at Veryansın TV.

Atay said, "The great warrior, true intellectual, writer Nihat Genç, who dedicated his life to the homeland and the republic, has passed away. My condolences to the Turkish nation. His last words were 'Keep the Republic alive'."

== Works ==
- Dün Korkusu (1989)
- Bu Çağın Soylusu (1991)
- Ofli Hoca / Şeriatta Ayıp Yoktur
- Kompile Hikayeler
- Dar Alanda Tufan (1993)
- Soğuk Sabun (1994)
- Köpekleşmenin Tarihi (1998)
- Modern Çağın Canileri (2000)
- Memleket Hikayeleri
- Arkası Karanlık Ağaçlar (2001)
- İhtiyar Kemancı (2002)
- Amerikan Köpekleri (2004)
- Edebiyat Dersleri (2004)
- Nöbetçi Yazılar (2004)
- Hattı Müdaafa (2005)
- Karanlığa Okunan Ezanlar (2006)
- Aşk Coğrafyasında Konuşmalar (2007)
- Kavga Günleri (2007)
- Veryansın (2008)
- Bir Millet Uyanıyor 17: "Kavga Günleri" (2009)
- Sordum Kara Çiçeğe (2009)
- Opus 61 (2010)
- Yurttaşların Cinlerle Bitmeyen Savaşı (2011)
- İşgal Günleri (2011)
- Bizi Kandırası Umman Bulunmaz (2012)
- Direniş Günleri (2013)
- İslamcı Erol Nasıl Çıldırdı? (2015)
- Yurduma Alçakları Uğratma! (2016)
- Nihat Genç'le Veryansın (2017)
- Bizim De Günümüz Gelecek (2020) ISBN 978-605-06308-1-7
- Saraya Kılınan Namazlar (2021)
- Bu Toprağın Dalkavukları (2022) ISBN 978-605-73127-7-8
