= Emin Çölaşan =

Turkish investigative journalist (born 1942)

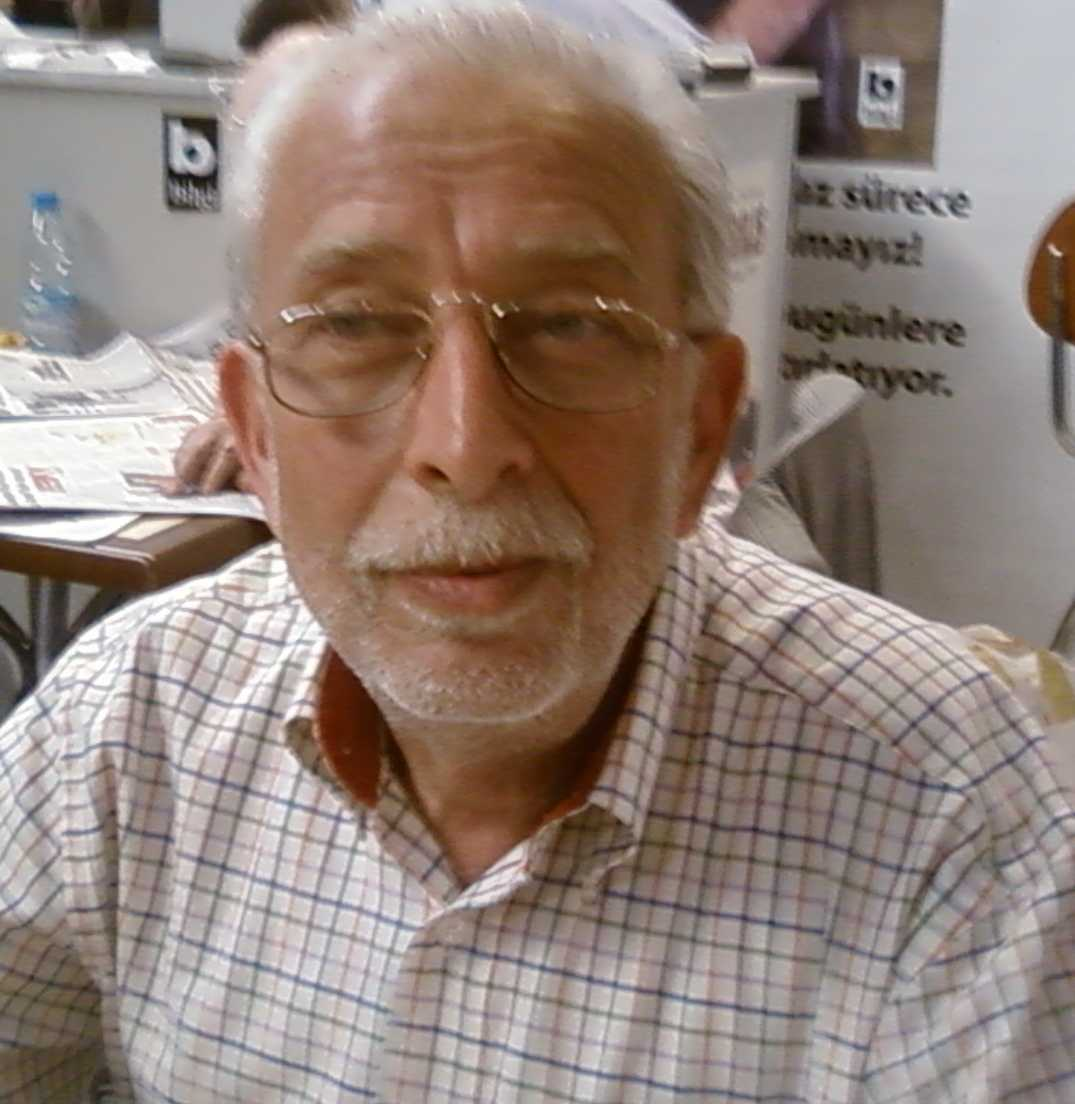
- Born: 14 March 1942 (age 84); Ankara, Turkey
- Education: TED Ankara College; Middle East Technical University (BS)
- Occupations: Columnist, writer
- Years active: 1977–present
- Notable credit(s): Milliyet (1977–1985), Hürriyet (1985–2007), Sözcü (2007–present)
- Spouse: Tansel Tuğcu (m. 1972)

Emin Çölaşan (born 14 March 1942) is a Turkish investigative journalist whose daily column appeared in the mass-circulation newspaper, Istanbul-based Hürriyet, for 22 years, from 1985 to 2007. Since 2007, he continues his column in Sözcü.

== Family background ==
A native of Ankara, Emin Çölaşan was born into a Cretan Turkish family whose surname, which literally means "desert strider", is a reference to his grandfather who was exiled by Sultan Abdülhamid II to the Fizan desert interior of Libya for seven years for taking part in the Young Turk movement. His maternal grandfather, Refik Şevket İnce, born in Polichnitos near Mytilene (modern-day Greek island of Lesbos), served under Turkish leader Mustafa Kemal Atatürk and subsequently in ministerial posts during the 1920s and into the 1950s. His father served in the State Meteorological Service where he was a general director for 14 years. His wife Tansel, who held the position of chief advocate for the Turkish Council of State (Danıştay), was the president of Atatürk Thought Association. He has no children.

== Education and career ==
Çölaşan finished his secondary studies in TED Ankara College and graduated from the Middle East Technical University with a degree in management studies. For a decade, he worked in various public institutions. He started his journalism career in 1977 at the Istanbul daily Milliyet, shifting in 1985 to become a regular columnist for Hürriyet. He is also the author of several books, primarily focused on malpractice in governmental and public circles in Turkey.

Çölaşan had been a critic of Turgut Özal, Turkey's prime minister from 1983 to 1989, who became the target of his 1980s bestseller books Turgut'un Serüveni ('Turgut's Adventure') and Turgut Nereden Koşuyor? ('Where is Turgut Running From?'). Çölaşan also criticized the incumbent AK Party government, and in August 2007 he was fired from Hürriyet. Çölaşan's dismissal was condemned by the Journalist’s Association of Turkey, which stated: "We cannot accept that Çölaşan, an important writer in the Turkish media, has been dismissed because of his dissident articles." Çölaşan has criticized the government's plans regarding Kurds in Turkey. Emin Çölaşan is a secularist, and has accused the AK Party government of Islamism.
