= 32. Gün =

Turkish TV show

- Genre: News, documentary, political commentary
- Country of origin: Turkey
- Original language: Turkish
- No. of seasons: 32
- No. of episodes: 1035

Original release
- Network: TRT 1 (1985–1992) atv (1995); Show TV (1992–1995) (1995–1998); CNN Türk (1999–2005); Kanal D (1999, 2005–2015); 360 (2015-2016)
- Release: 1 October 1985 – 8 December 2016

32. Gün (English: 32nd Day) was a Turkish national and international television news show. Launched in 1985 by Mehmet Ali Birand, it was Turkey's longest-running and one of the most influential news programmes. The show was originally aired on state-owned TRT 1 (1985–1992), then moved on to private television channels.

Contributors to 32. Gün include: Coşkun Aral, Mithat Bereket, Ali Kırca, Cenk Başlamış, Ahmet Sever, Bülent Çaplı, Rıdvan Akar, Cüneyt Özdemir, Can Dündar, Metin Çorabatır, Çiğdem Anad, Deniz Arman, Ayfer Dedekorkut, Serdar Akinan, Kerem Şenel, and Utku Başar.

== Episodes ==
Season	Years	Number of episodes	Guests
1	1985-1986	9	Yasser Arafat
2	1986-1987	10	
3	1987-1988	10	
4	1988-1989	10	
5	1989-1990	11	Saddam Hussein
6	1990-1991	11	
7	1991-1992	20	
8	1992-1993	47	Abdullah Öcalan, Eddie Murphy
9	1993-1994	44	Mohammad Hussein Fadlallah
10	1994-1995	43	
11	1995-1996	39	
12	1996-1997	43	
13	1997-1998	39	
14	1998-1999	26	
15	1999-2000	47	
16	2000-2001	46	
17	2001-2002	51	
18	2002-2003	50	
19	2003-2004	50	
20	2004-2005	42	Bashar al-Assad
21	2005-2006	34	
22	2006-2007	37	
23	2007-2008	42	
24	2008-2009	41	
25	2009-2010	37	Celâl Şengör
26	2010-2011	40	
27	2011-2012	36	
28	2012-2013	38	
29	2013-2014	42	
30	2014-2015	21	
31	2015-2016	19	
32	2016	10	

== Books ==
- Mehmet Ali Birand (2005), 20 Yılın Perde Arkası: 32. Gün (Backstage of 20 Years: 32. Gün), Doğan Kitap
