= Murder of Michał Adamowicz =

Polish electrician (1954–1982)

Michał Adamowicz
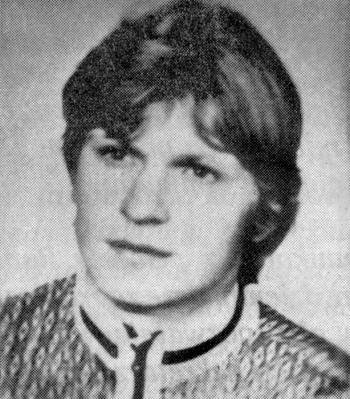
- Born: 1954; Lithuanian SSR, Soviet Union
- Died: 5 September 1982 (aged 28); Lubin, Poland
- Honours: Honorary Citizen of Lower Silesia

Michał Adamowicz (1954 – 5 September 1982) was a Polish electrician at the Lubin mine, a member of the Polish trade union Solidarity. He died as a result of actions by the Citizens' Militia during a demonstration on 31 August 1982, known as the Lubin crime. The direct cause of death was a gunshot wound to the head. At the time of his death, Michał Adamowicz was 28 years old.

== Biography ==
Adamowicz was born near Vilnius and had three sisters. In 1958, his family moved to Poland. Around 1973, he found employment at a mine in Iwiny. In 1975, he began working at the Lubin mine, and in 1978, he received an apartment from the enterprise. He was non-partisan and joined the Solidarity in August 1980. After the imposition of martial law, he participated in a strike in the G7 department. Despite the outlawing of Solidarity, he continued paying membership dues and distributing leaflets.

== Circumstances of death ==
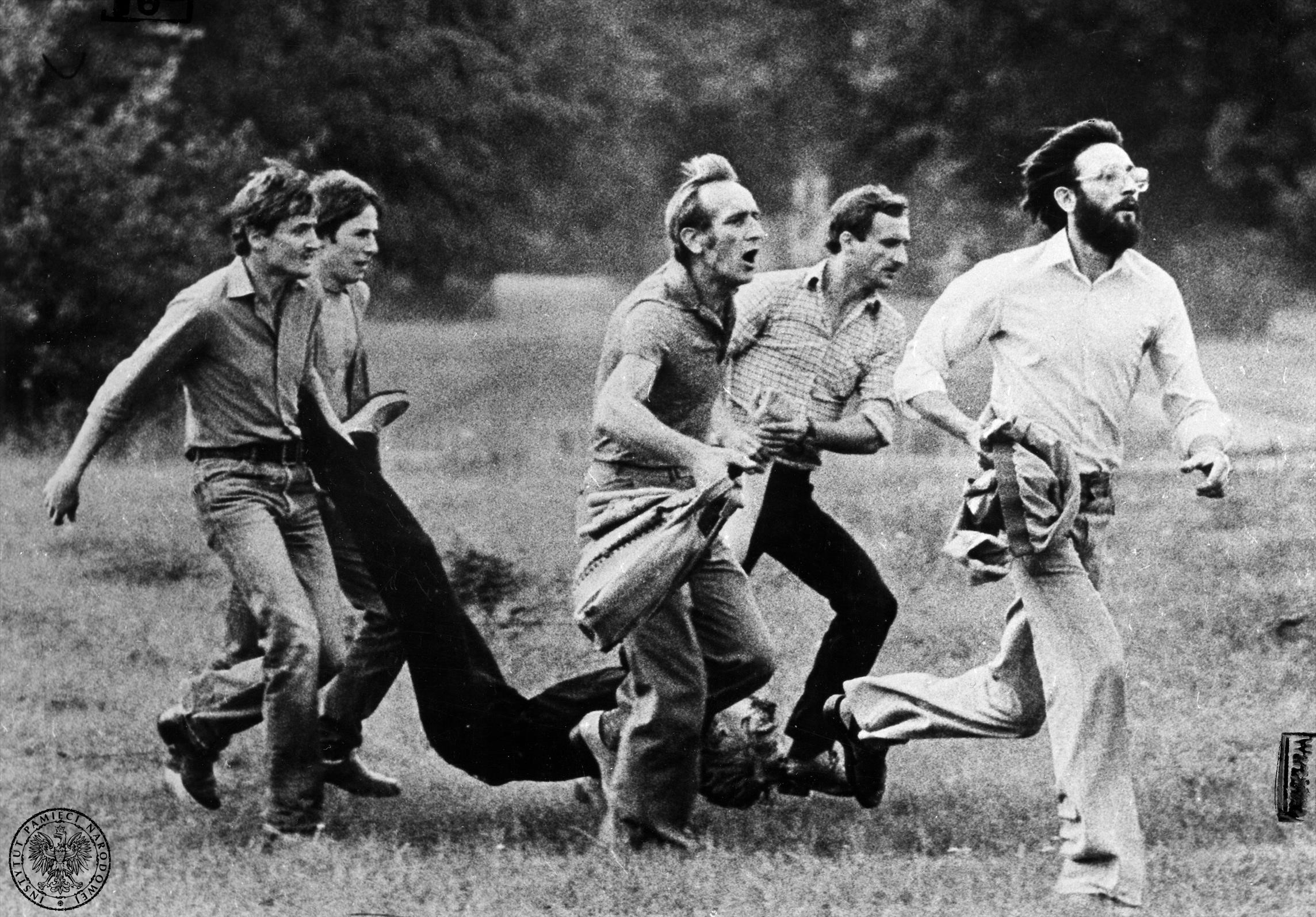
Demonstrators carry the wounded Michał Adamowicz. Photo by Krzysztof Raczkowiak

Adamowicz was among the protesters during a demonstration held on 31 August 1982 in Lubin. That morning, he went to work, finishing at 2:00 PM. He then learned of a demonstration planned for 4:00 PM. He joined a group of colleagues, intending, as he put it, "to fight the communists a little". He took part in arranging a cross made of flowers and shouted slogans. Along with others, he fled at the sound of a salvo of live ammunition. A bullet struck him at 5:30 PM as he ran near the bridge over the Baczyna stream, tearing apart part of his face and the area around his right ear.

A photograph by Krzysztof Raczkowiak, a photojournalist for the Legnica weekly Konkrety, survives, showing four men carrying Michał Adamowicz after he was hit by a bullet. On Zawadzki Street, people stopped a Polski Fiat 125p car, whose driver, Jan Kiper, agreed to take Adamowicz to the hospital. Another photo exists of men placing the severely wounded Adamowicz in the back of the vehicle. He arrived at the hospital unconscious. During an initial examination, doctors noted a 2.5 by 3 cm hole in his parietal bone and a 0.5 by 0.7 cm hole in his occipital bone. Adamowicz died in the hospital on 5 September 1982. A post-mortem examination revealed that the two holes were connected by a channel passing through the right hemisphere of the brain. The cause of death was determined to be a gunshot wound causing damage to the central nervous system. It later emerged that doctors were instructed to keep demonstration victims alive as long as possible to avoid recording them as fatalities in official records.

At the time of his death, Michał Adamowicz was 28 years old. His funeral on 8 September became a public demonstration in Lubin. The mass was attended by 20 priests, 1 monk, and approximately 4,000 Lubin residents, with delegations from factory crews in Legnica, Głogów, and provincial capitals also present.

=== Perpetrators ===
Efforts to cover up the crime began within hours of the event. The trial of the militiamen started in 1993 and lasted 10 years. Ultimately, three militiamen were convicted: Bogdan Garus, former deputy provincial commander of the Citizens' Militia in Legnica; Tadeusz Jarocki, commander of a ZOMO platoon that fired live ammunition; and Jan Maj, deputy city commander of the Citizens' Militia in Lubin. They received sentences of 15 months, two and a half years, and three and a half years imprisonment, respectively. The leniency of the sentences was influenced by amnesties.

== Personal life ==
He married Wanda in 1973; they had a son, Łukasz, and a daughter, Agnieszka.

== Legacy ==
Flowers were repeatedly laid at the site of his fatal wounding in later years. On 11 April 1983, a wooden cross was placed there with the inscription: "Red murderers killed Michał Adamowicz, aged 28, with a shot to the back of the head – we will avenge him". The wife of the deceased frequently placed flowers and lit candles at the site of her husband's wounding, but these were promptly destroyed or removed. Additionally, Citizens' Militia officers demanded that Adamowicz's family refrain from installing a stone tombstone on his grave. They then pressured the family to alter the death date listed (originally 31 August). Facing resistance from his wife, a local stonemason, threatened with the closure of his business by the Security Service, corrected it to 5 September.

In 2015, the Toruń advertising agency Project used Krzysztof Raczkowiak's photograph of the severely wounded Adamowicz to promote Extra Żytnia vodka on social media, with the added slogan "Hangover? A script written by Żytnia". This sparked widespread criticism. The brand issued an apology for the incident.

== Commemoration ==
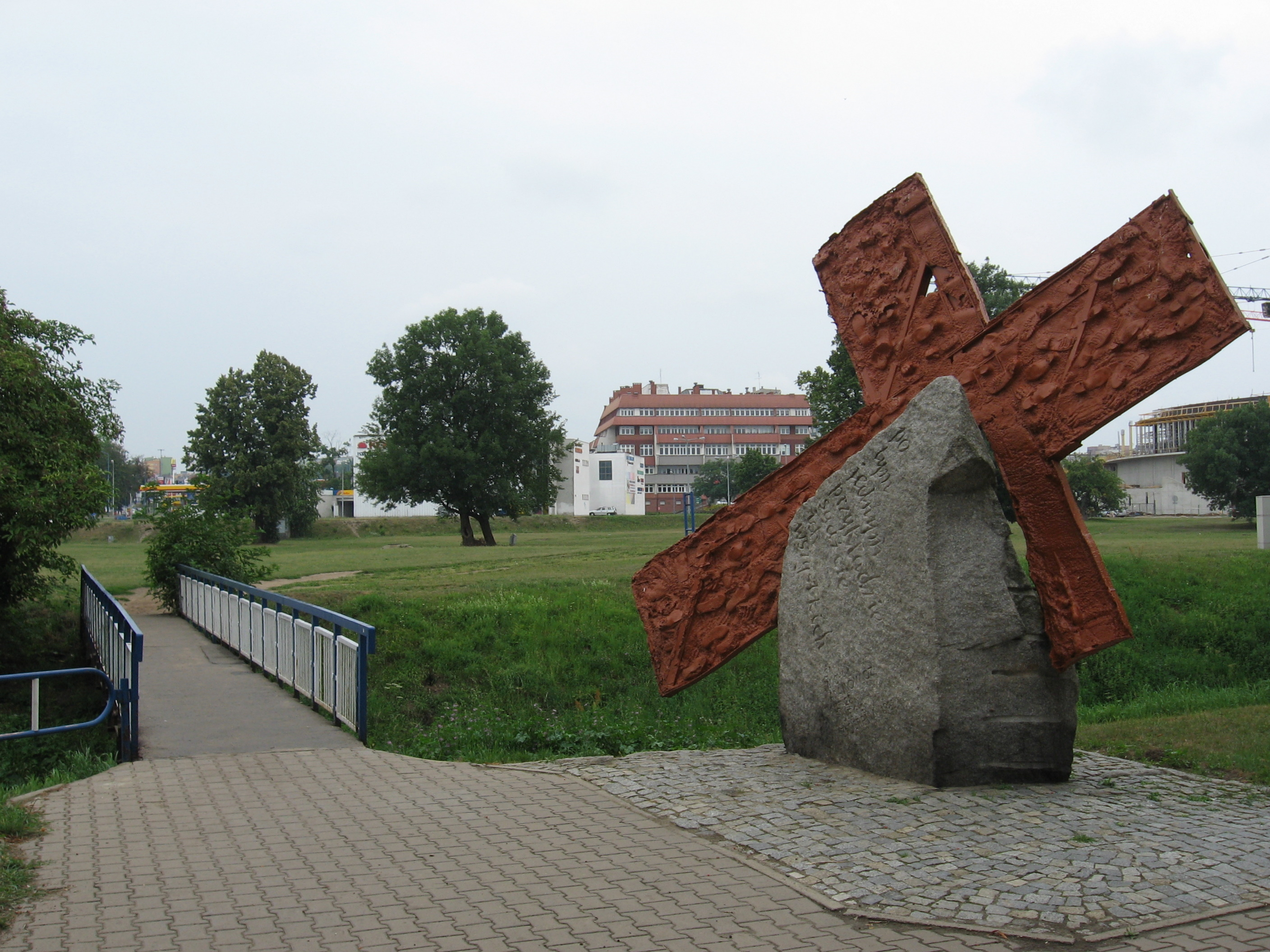
Cross erected at the site of Michał Adamowicz's wounding

- A monument commemorating the event was placed near the site of Michał Adamowicz's fatal wounding.
- On 31 August 2007, during an Extraordinary Session of the Lower Silesian Voivodeship Assembly in Lubin, the posthumous title of Honorary Citizen of Lower Silesia was awarded to the victims of the Lubin crime: Michał Adamowicz, Mieczysław Poźniak, and Andrzej Trajkowski.
