= Turkish Education Association =

Turkish organization

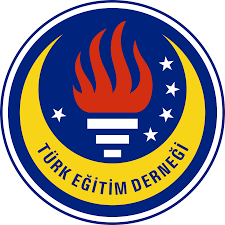

Information
- Former name: Türk Maarif Cemiyeti
- School type: Private
- Established: 31 January 1928; 97 years ago
- Founder: Mustafa Kemal Atatürk
- Language: English, Turkish

The Turkish Education Association (Turkish: Türk Eğitim Derneği or TED) is an educational association in Turkey. It was established in Turkey on January 1, 1928, during the rule of Mustafa Kemal Atatürk. The organization acquired the status of an association for public benefit in the resolution of the Council of Ministers on December 12, 1939.

The association, which has been operating under the name Turkish Education Association since 1946, currently has 43 schools that are active and provide education as of 2023. The first educational institution opened by the Turkish Education Association is the school established in 1931, which continues its education today under the name TED Ankara College Foundation Schools.

== See also ==
- TED Ankara College Foundation Schools
