= New York State Police Troop C scandal =

1993 American evidence fabrication scandal

The New York State Police Troop C scandal involved the fabrication of evidence by members of the New York State Police, which was used to convict suspects in Central New York. The scandal involved a range of cases, including two separate murder cases, and resulted in four troopers serving time in prison. It was determined that six police officers had fabricated evidence in at least 36 cases.

== John Spencer ==
Trooper Craig D. Harvey was charged with fabricating evidence about suspect John Spencer in April 1993. Harvey admitted he and another trooper lifted fingerprints from items Spencer touched while in Troop C headquarters during booking. Harvey attached the fingerprints to evidence cards and later claimed that he had pulled the fingerprints from the scene of the murder. The forged evidence was presented at Spencer's trial, resulting in a conviction and sentence of 50 years to life in prison. The original 1987 conviction was overturned, but Spencer was convicted again at a 1994 retrial.

== Shirley Kinge ==
One fabrication involved the 1989 murders of the Harris family of Dryden, New York. Warren and Dolores Harris, their daughter Shelby, 15, and their son Marc, 11, were bound and blindfolded in their home. Shelby was raped and sodomized. All four victims were shot in the head, and the house was doused with gasoline and set on fire. State police investigators said that evidence led them to Michael Kinge, and that officers killed him when he pointed a shotgun at them during the execution of a search warrant. His mother, Shirley Kinge, admitted to using a credit card stolen from the Harris home, which led investigators to consider her a potential accomplice. New York State Police had also previously obtained a sworn statement from a resident on the same road as the Harris home (approximately four miles west from the Harris home and one mile east of the parking lot where the Harris van had been found following the murders). In the sworn statement, the witness stated that, "on December 23, 1989, at approximately 6:50 a.m., he was exiting his driveway when he saw a slow-moving van approaching his driveway from the east." The witness "identified the driver of this van as a light-skinned black male wearing a stocking cap, and further stated that he was accompanied by a female passenger, also light-skinned but darker than the driver, who appeared older than the driver. He indicated that his description of the occupants of the van matched the composite sketches of the suspects which had been publicized by the news media." The witness later withdrew his statement. Officers Harding and Lishansky, of Troop C, also claimed that they found fingerprints on gasoline cans found at the Harris home. Kinge was convicted of burglary and arson and received a sentence of 17 to 44 years in prison. She served two and a half years before Harding and Lishansky admitted that the fingerprint evidence had been fabricated by retrieving the fingerprints of Ms. Kinge from her job and asserting they found them on the cans. Her conviction was later overturned.

After being released, Kinge brought suit against the State of New York, claiming damages of over $500 million. The Court of Claims eventually ruled in favor of Kinge on the claims of (1) malicious prosecution and (2) negligent supervision and awarded her $286,312, noting as follows:

"In sum, the actions of Senior Investigator McElligott, or in this case, an unjustified and complete lack of supervision and control, allowed Investigator Harding the time and opportunity to fabricate fingerprint evidence which ultimately became the only significant evidence placing claimant at the Harris home. There can be no dispute that such fabricated evidence played a key role in her conviction for these crimes. Without such evidence, this court finds that probable cause did not exist to prosecute claimant for any of the crimes which occurred at the Harris family home. Claimant has established her malicious prosecution cause of action. In retrospect, and based on these findings, this claim should have been a relatively easy one on which to determine the issue of liability. Claimant, however, obviously did not appear before this court with 'clean hands,' and she has not engendered any great sympathy from this court. Claimant's own admitted criminal conduct in possessing, utilizing, and forging the signature of Dolores Harris on a credit card brought the focus of the investigation upon her. Despite her testimony to the contrary at this trial, the court finds that claimant was a willing participant with her son in this scheme to use credit cards belonging to the Harris family. Even if the court accepts her testimony that she was completely unaware of what transpired at the Harris home, her willingness to participate has been established by her actions in forging a signature to a credit card, and then using that card, which was indisputably obtained from the Harris home, to purchase personal items for her own benefit within hours of the burglary, murders, and arson."

== CIA interview ==
The scandal became known when Trooper David L. Harding was interviewed for a job at the Central Intelligence Agency (CIA). He was asked if he was willing to break the law for his country. He answered "yes", then explained how he had worked to convict people he felt sure were guilty by fabricating evidence. He assumed the CIA would be pleased with his answer, but instead they notified the United States Department of Justice. There was a 14-month delay between the discovery of the misconduct and any action being taken.

== Troopers ==
- Craig D. Harvey, a 16-year veteran lieutenant who headed the identification unit, pleaded guilty on July 29, 1993, to fabricating evidence in three cases. He was sentenced to serve 2½ to 7 years in prison.
- David L. Harding, a 7-year veteran, pleaded guilty in a plea agreement and was sentenced on December 16, 1992, to serve 4 to 12 years in prison along with paying a fine of $20,000 for fabricating evidence in four documented cases.
- Robert M. Lishansky, an 11-year veteran, pleaded guilty in a plea agreement and was sentenced on June 10, 1993, to serve 6 to 18 years in prison for fabricating evidence in 21 cases.
- David M. Beers, a 15-year veteran, pleaded not guilty both on May 5, 1993, and on July 29, 1993, to charges of fabricating evidence in two separate cases. He was acquitted by a jury on September 28, 1993. However, he was forced to resign.
- Patrick O'Hara, a 16-year veteran lieutenant, was suspended July 29, 1993, pending an investigation into Harvey's allegations that O'Hara helped fake evidence. Prosecutors dropped the charge that O'Hara had helped Harvey fake a fingerprint, but O'Hara served one year in prison after pleading guilty to perjury and tampering with evidence.

== See also ==
- Falsified evidence
- Police misconduct
