= 1982 demonstrations in Poland =

1982 protests for democracy in Poland

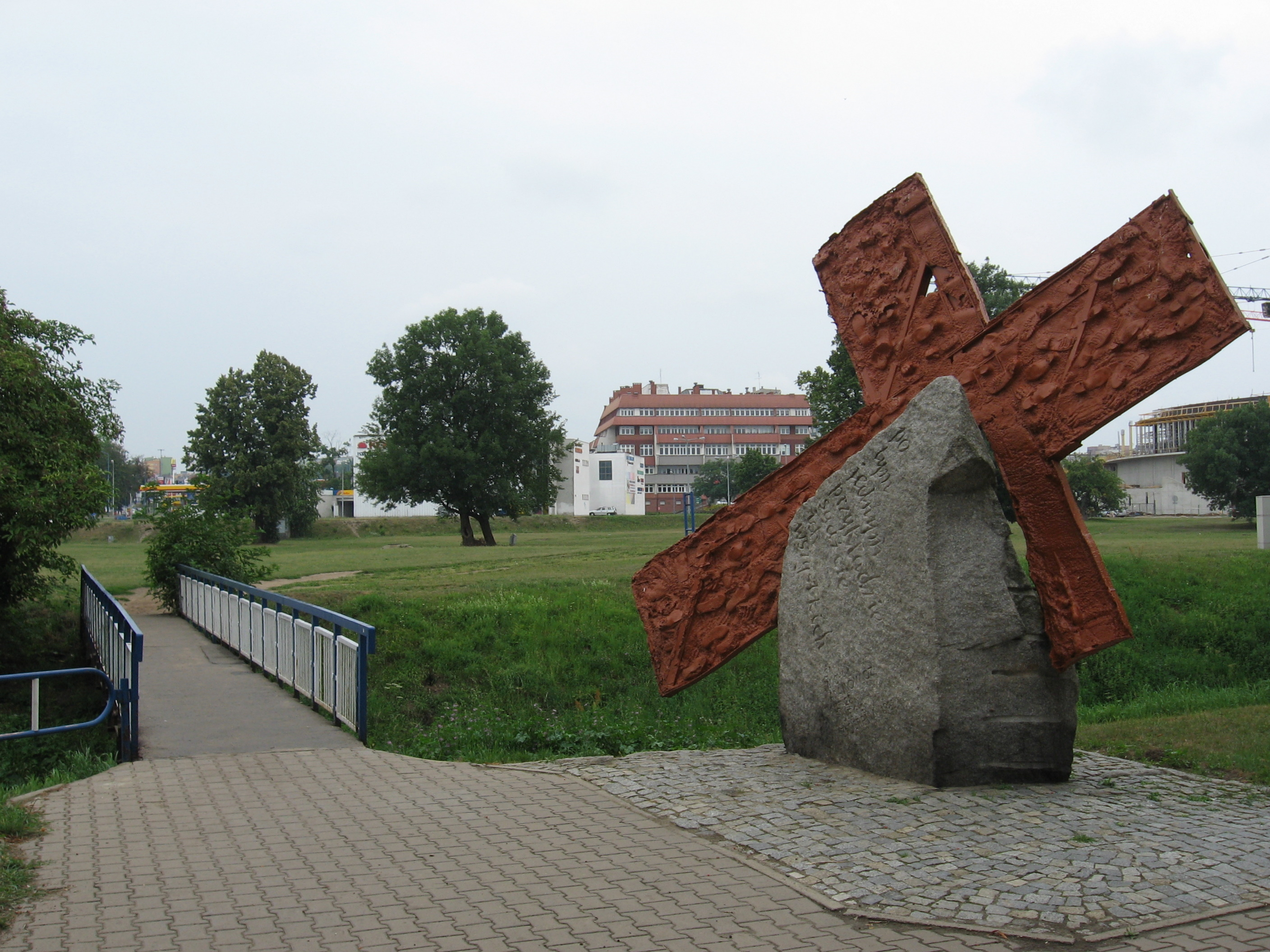
A cross to commemorate Michal Adamowicz from Lubin, who was shot in the back of the head on the nearby bridge

The 1982 demonstrations in Poland refers to anti-government street demonstrations organized by underground Solidarity to commemorate the second anniversary of the Gdańsk Agreement. The bloodiest protest occurred in southwestern Poland, in the town of Lubin, on 31 August 1982. The Lubin demonstration resulted in three protesters killed by Communist services, and an unknown number of wounded. On the same day, rallies and demonstrations took place in several cities across the country. According to Solidarity sources, there were four more victims—in Wrocław, Gdańsk, Nowa Huta, and Toruń. According to official government sources, there were demonstrations in 66 cities.

== Background ==
On 13 December 1981 the Communist government of Poland under general Wojciech Jaruzelski crushed the opposition, introducing martial law. The main oppositional movement, Solidarity, was delegalized, and its key members were interned. However, by April 1982, Solidarity re-emerged, creating its underground body, the Temporary Coordinating Committee (known as TKK from the Polish name Tymczasowa Komisja Koordynacyjna), with delegates who had eluded arrests – Zbigniew Bujak from Warsaw, Bogdan Lis from Gdańsk, Władysław Frasyniuk from Wrocław, and Władysław Hardek from Kraków. At the beginning, the Committee opposed street demonstrations, drawing the so-called "Five times yes" appeal, which stipulated negotiations with the government and release of all political prisoners. However, when the program was rejected, the Committee changed its stance, announcing the "Five times no" appeal, and urging the nation to participate in demonstrations on 31 August 1982, the second anniversary of the Gdańsk Agreement.

The 31 August street protests were organized by all regional underground structures of Solidarity. In Lower Silesia, the main oppositional bodies were Regional Strike Committee, and Fighting Solidarity. In Legnica Voivodeship, there also were such organizations, as Interfactory Strike Committee, and Interfactory Coordinating Committee. The demonstrations were regarded as very important for the future of the opposition movements, as activists hoped that they would become a turning point, forcing the government to change its policy.

The government was aware of these plans, and initiated a massive propaganda campaign, aimed at reducing the number of demonstrators. Special posters were printed and distributed, and on 25 August general Czesław Kiszczak spoke on TV, warning against "possible tragic consequences". His threats were barely concealed: "If the provocateurs have not had enough of their lessons, we will provide them with some more". In factories across the nation, party activists warned the workers, telling them not to demonstrate.

However, the most important part of the action was carried out by the security services. In the last days of August, its agents detained hundreds of people, and confiscated several underground printing shops. On 28 August, during a teleconference, general Czesław Kiszczak told police commanders of the voivodeships: "The victory must be ours. We have to use a tough rule of action: be quick and determined". Members of the Politburo of the Polish United Workers' Party sometimes used an exaggerated tone, while describing the plans of Solidarity. On 26 August, during a meeting with party activists in Szczecin, said: "The plans of the extremists are the following: public gatherings, a general strike, and, if necessary, an uprising aimed at overthrowing the social system. I accuse Solidarity leaders of political stupidity, leading to crimes against the state and the nation".

On 27 August, Zbigniew Bujak, one of the Solidarity leaders who had eluded arrest, published a statement, in which he urged the nation to participate in rallies and demonstrations on the second anniversary of the Gdańsk Agreement. Two days later, general Jaruzelski warned people to keep away from protests. On the next day, units of riot police armed with water cannons were deployed on the streets of Warsaw and other main cities of the country. Citizens were warned that the government would not hesitate to use force. Polish news agency PAP issued a statement, which said: "The martial law decree makes the forces of law and order absolutely responsible for ensuring public order. In order to fulfill this duty, the agencies of law and order may use means of direct compulsion and in special cases they can be aided by units of the armed forces".

== Street protests across the country ==
On 31 August 1982 demonstrations took place in 66 Polish towns and cities, with as many as 18 of them occurring in southwestern province of Lower Silesia. Official reports stated that protests took place in 65 places. In Wrocław, which was one of main centers of underground Solidarity, several thousand people for many hours fought riot police and soldiers. One demonstrator, 27-year-old Kazimierz Michałczyk, was killed by a bullet. Street fights were a common sight not only in major urban centers, such as Warsaw, Kraków, Szczecin, Wrocław, Łódź, and Gdańsk, but also in provincial cities (Rzeszów, Koszalin, Kielce, Przemyśl, Częstochowa, Bielsko-Biała, Gorzów Wielkopolski), and towns (Starachowice, Lubin, Konin). The magnitude of the demonstrations was confirmed by official sources, as on 1 September PAP informed that a day before, the police detained 4,050 people nationwide (589 in Warsaw, 645 in Wrocław, 201 in Szczecin, and 120 in Gorzów Wielkopolski). Among those arrested was Zbigniew Romaszewski, a Solidarity activist and physicist of the Polish Academy of Sciences.

Besides Michałczyk, who was killed in Wrocław, other victims of police brutality were: 32-year-old Piotr Sadowski from Gdańsk, Mieczysław Joniec from Nowa Huta, and Jacek Osmański from Toruń. Additional victim was 35-year-old Stanisław Raczek, who was severely beaten during a protest in Kielce, and died on 7 September. In Kielce, where about 4000 people demonstrated in front of the Cathedral, riot police used tear gas and truncheons. In Koszalin, at the main market square, some 3000 people showed up, who were dispersed by the police. In northwestern city of Gorzów Wielkopolski, some 5000 people appeared in front of the cathedral. The demonstration turned into a riot, which lasted several hours, and in which 14 police vehicles were destroyed, 24 officers and 5 demonstrators were wounded, and 200 people detained.

== Lubin events ==
Among towns and cities whose citizens joined the demonstrations was the southwestern copper-mining town of Lubin in Lower Silesian Voivodeship. The rally in the local Freedom Square began on 31 August; at 3 pm A cross made of flowers was laid and a small banner was raised. People sang the Polish national anthem, and then chanted: "down with the junta", "release those interned", "Jaruzelski is a traitor and murderer of the nation", "down with communism", "free Lech Wałęsa" etc. About 30 minutes later, the crowd of 2,000 was surrounded by 80-member unit of the riot police. In response, agitated protesters shouted: "pigs", "bandits", "Gestapo", "servants of Brezhnev". People unsuccessfully tried to erect a barricade. They were attacked and dispersed with tear gas.

At 4 pm, a platoon of riot police (ZOMO) from Legnica appeared on Lubin streets and immediately attacked the protesters. The officers were armed with AK-47 assault rifles, which they pointed towards the demonstrators. When the line of policemen reached the intersection of Kopernika and Odrodzenia streets, some of them opened fire. A few minutes later, two men, 26-year-old Mieczysław Poźniak and 32-year-old Andrzej Trajkowski, were mortally wounded.

The events of the late afternoon and evening hours are difficult to recount. It has been established that the police opened fire several times more, thus hitting 28-year-old Michał Adamowicz in the back of his head. He died on 5 September. Before 5 pm, another ZOMO platoon came to Lubin (its members were armed with semi-automatic pistols P-83 Wanads), and local police commandant asked offices in Leszno and Zielona Góra to send more reinforcements. At about 5:30, the police changed their tactics. Instead of attacking large groups of demonstrators, the officers created the so-called raid groups, consisting of 6–7 officers, riding in Nysa vans. They roamed the town, brutally attacking even single persons.

Meanwhile, the demonstrators, upon finding out about deaths of their two colleagues, became more determined. More people joined the fighting, and riots lasted until 10:30 pm, when another ZOMO company from Zielona Góra, a platoon of soldiers from Krosno Odrzańskie, and three water cannons were brought to Lubin. Altogether, 1323 officers pacified the demonstration, and new street fights erupted in the town both on 2 and 3 September. Altogether, on 31 August in Lubin, three demonstrators were killed, unknown number wounded (six of them were hit by bullets). Around 300 people were arrested.

Immediately after pacification of the town, security forces began destruction of evidence. On the night of 31 August – 1 September the streets were carefully cleaned, with all shells and bullets taken for analysis. On 2 September police authorities ordered repairs of damaged buildings – broken windows were replaced, and traces of bullets on the walls were covered with plaster. The investigation, despite consistent statements of witnesses of the massacre, was closed.

== See also ==
- Poznań 1956 protests
- Polish 1970 protests
- June 1976 protests
- Lublin 1980 strikes
- Jastrzębie-Zdrój 1980 strikes
- 1981 warning strike in Poland
- 1988 Polish strikes
- History of Solidarity
