= False evidence =

Any information created or obtained illegally in order to sway a verdict in court

False evidence, fabricated evidence, forged evidence, fake evidence or tainted evidence is information created or obtained illegally in order to sway the verdict in a court case. Falsified evidence could be created by either side in a case (including the police/prosecution in a criminal case), or by someone sympathetic to either side. Misleading by suppressing evidence can also be considered a form of false evidence (by omission); however, in some cases, suppressed evidence is excluded because it cannot be proved the accused was aware of the items found or of their location. The analysis of evidence (forensic evidence) may also be forged if the person doing the forensic work finds it easier to fabricate evidence and test results than to perform the actual work involved. Parallel construction is a form of false evidence in which the evidence is truthful but its origins are untruthfully described, at times in order to avoid evidence being excluded as inadmissible due to unlawful means of procurement such as an unlawful search.

Apart from the desire for one side or another to succeed or fail in its case, the exact rationale for falsifying evidence can vary. Falsifying evidence to procure the conviction of those honestly believed guilty is considered a form of police corruption even though it is intended to (and may) result in the conviction of the guilty; however it may also reflect the incorrect prejudices of the falsifier, and it also tends to encourage corrupt police behavior generally. In the United Kingdom, this is sometimes called 'Noble Cause Corruption.' A "throw down," i.e. the planting of a weapon at a crime scene might be used by the police to justify shooting the victim in self-defense, and avoid possible prosecution for manslaughter. However, the accused might have falsified some evidence, especially if not arrested immediately, or by having other access to a crime scene and related areas.

== Types ==
- Forged evidence - an item or information manufactured, or altered, to support some agenda, is not admissible in many courts, including U.S. criminal courts.
- Planted evidence - an item or information which has been moved, or planted at a scene, to seem related to the accused party, is not admissible in many courts, including U.S. criminal courts.
- Tainted evidence - information which has been obtained by illegal means or has been revealed (or traced) using evidence acquired by illegal search, and/or seizure, is called the "fruit of the poisonous tree" and is not admissible in many courts, including U.S. criminal courts.
- Parallel construction - tainted evidence, where the origin of the evidence is untruthfully represented, preventing discussion of whether it was legally obtained or not.
- Suppressed evidence - an item or information which a court judge has ruled as "inadmissible" is forbidden to be presented in a court case. Suppressed evidence might be excluded because it was found hidden or locked away in areas the accused could not be proven to know.

In some criminal cases, a person will be identified as a "person of interest" for a few days before arrest, allowing time to reveal suspicious actions (such as in recorded phone calls), or to attempt to falsify evidence before their arrest, e.g. to prove that the accused was not at the scene of the crime when it was being committed.

== Cases ==
=== The Crewe murders ===
In June 1970 a couple from Pukekawa, Lower Waikato, New Zealand, were killed and their bodies dumped in the Waikato River. Arthur Allan Thomas, a local farmer, was twice convicted of their murders but following massive publicity was later given a royal pardon.

Two bullet cases presented by senior detectives Bruce Hutton and Lenrick Johnston were crucial evidence for the conviction. In 1980, after Thomas's pardon a royal commission into the convictions concluded "Mr Hutton and Mr Johnston planted the shellcase, exhibit 350 in the Crewe garden, and that they did so to manufacture evidence that Mr Thomas's rifle had been used for the killings."

=== Killing of Bernard Whitehurst ===
In 1975, after the shooting death of Bernard Whitehurst by a police officer in Montgomery, Alabama who incorrectly identified Whitehurst as the suspect in the robbery of a neighborhood grocery store, there was a police cover-up that included police officers planting a gun on him from the police evidence room. The coroner relied on police reports that Whitehurst was killed by a bullet fired through the chest. After an investigation by the local newspaper and local attorney Donald Watkins raised questions about the facts of the case, six months later, the District Attorney James Evans ordered the body to be exhumed and an autopsy to be performed. The results of the autopsy showed that Whitehurst had been shot in the back. The attempted cover-up led to the resignation of eight police officers, the city’s mayor, James Robinson and the Director of Public Safety, Ed Wright. No police officer was convicted of a crime. Forty years later, the Montgomery City Council passed a resolution that formally expressed regret for the shooting and cover-up.

=== Murder of Holly Staker ===
In 1992, 11-year-old Holly Staker was raped and murdered while babysitting in Waukegan, Illinois. A local man named Juan Rivera was convicted of the murder solely on the basis of a confession, one that he claimed was coerced. No physical evidence linked him to the crime scene and many details of his confession contradicted known evidence from the crime scene. DNA testing done in 2004 on semen taken from the crime scene ruled out Rivera as the source; however, the prosecution argued that the semen sample came from previous consensual sex with another man. Rivera was convicted again. His conviction was overturned by the appellate court who took the unusual step of barring prosecutors from retrying Rivera and he was released.

After his release, Rivera's attorneys asked the courts to order genetic testing on a piece of evidence the prosecution had tried to use at his trial in 1993. Rivera's shoes had blood on them, which the prosecution argued belonged to Holly. The prosecution withdrew them prior to his first trial when it was discovered that the shoes were not available for sale anywhere in the United States until after the murder. In 2015, Rivera's attorney sought further forensic testing on the shoes. DNA analysis indicated that the blood indeed belonged to Holly, but also contained another genetic sample; one that matched the semen sample. Rivera's defense team insisted that this was proof not only that the blood was planted, but that the real killer's DNA was inadvertently planted as well. The DNA has yet to be matched to an individual, but has been linked to DNA from another home invasion and murder. The man convicted of that crime also claims to be wrongfully convicted.

Following his exoneration, he was awarded $20 million USD, the largest wrongful conviction settlement in US history.

=== New York State Police Troop C scandal ===
In the New York State Police Troop C scandal of 1993, Craig D. Harvey, a New York State Police trooper, was charged with fabricating evidence. Harvey admitted he and another trooper lifted fingerprints from items the suspect, John Spencer, touched while in Troop C headquarters during booking. He attached the fingerprints to evidence cards and later claimed that he had pulled the fingerprints from the scene of the murder. The forged evidence was used during trial and John Spencer was sentenced to 50 years to life in prison.

After the truth came out, it was discovered that they had been falsifying evidence in cases for many years. At least three officers were convicted. Every case the department had been involved in had to be reinvestigated.

=== FBI scandal ===
In the 1990s, the fingerprint, DNA, and explosive units of the Federal Bureau of Investigation Laboratory had written reports confirming local police department theories without actually performing the work.

Such laws and regulatory procedures stipulating the conditions under which evidence can be handled and manipulated fall under a body of due process statutes called chain of custody rules. It is crucial for law enforcement agencies to scrupulously collect, handle and transfer evidence in order to avoid its falsification. In most jurisdictions, chain of evidence rules require that the transfer of criminal evidence be handled by as few persons as possible. To prevent error or improper tampering, chain of evidence rules also stipulate that those authorized to experiment with collected evidence document the nature, time, date and duration of their handling.

=== 303 Creative LLC v. Elenis ===
303 Creative LLC v. Elenis was decided by the Supreme Court of the United States on June 30, 2023. In this case, the defendants filed false evidence with their appeal to the U.S. Supreme Court. The false evidence was claimed by the defendant to have been a request for a gay wedding site that was submitted to the defendant's web site. The web site request was claimed to have been submitted on the afternoon of September 21, 2016; this was after the 10th Circuit found in favor of the State of Colorado (July 26, 2021), but before the defendant filed an appeal to the US Supreme Court (September 24, 2021). In an article in The New Republic, reporter Melissa Gira Grant found that the contact information in the false evidence was a real person, but they had never submitted a request to 303 Creative, and in fact, they were already married, and not gay. The lawyers for Colorado said the evidence was irrelevant to the case, and neither the majority opinion nor the dissent of the Supreme Court ruling mentioned the false evidence. Although the defendant submitted the request as evidence, they claim to have no knowledge of whether the request was real, using the claim of a web site submission as plausible deniability. Further, the defendant claimed fear that responding to the request to see if it was valid might result in the state of Colorado suing her.

=== Biden v. Nebraska ===
Biden v. Nebraska was decided by the Supreme Court of the United States on June 30, 2023. The case was related to the forgiveness of federal student loans by the Biden administration that was challenged by multiple states. Much of this case hinged on a claim that the Missouri Higher Education Loan Authority (MOHELA) would be financially harmed by the student loan forgiveness. However, internal documents from the MOHELA show that it did not file the suit, made no claim of financial harm, and had nothing to do with the case. The evidence submitted by the Missouri Attorney General was a fabrication that MOHELA did not participate in. Despite the reporting that the evidence of financial harm to MOHELA was false, the U.S. Supreme Court ruled against the Biden administration.

== See also ==
- False accusations
- False arrest
- Fingerprint
- Intimidation
- Kompromat § History
- Junk science
- Miscarriage of justice
- Parallel construction
- Surveillance abuse
- 2015 Ninoy Aquino International Airport bullet planting scandal
- Barış Pehlivan
- Howland will forgery trial
- List of wrongful convictions in the United States
- M62 Coach Bombing
