= Haluk Şahin =

Turkish journalist, academic and television producer

- Born: 1941 (age 84–85); Istanbul, Turkey
- Education: Istanbul University
- Occupations: Journalist, academic and television producer

Haluk Şahin is a Turkish journalist, academic and television producer. Having received his PhD from Indiana University Bloomington in 1974, he was a lecturer at Istanbul Bilgi University as of 2013.

Shortly after the release of the film Troy in 2004, an article in Radikal written by Şahin and entitled "Were the Trojans Turks?" attracted public interest and generated a debate over the significance of Troy and the Trojan War in modern Turkey. In 2006, he was among five journalists who stood trial on charges of attempting to influence the outcome of a trial through their writing, and of publicly denigrating Turkish identity and the institutions of the Turkish state. The charges were later dropped.
