= Roger Hanlon =

American marine biologist

Roger T. Hanlon
- Born: Roger Thomas Hanlon; May 17, 1947 (age 79); Cincinnati, Ohio
- Education: University of Miami
- Known for: Cephalopod behavior
- Scientific career
- Fields: Marine biology
- Workplaces: Brown University; Marine Biological Laboratory
- Thesis: Aspects Of The Biology Of The Squid Loligo (doryteuthis) Plei In Captivity (1978)

Roger Thomas Hanlon (born May 17, 1947) is an American marine biologist, ethologist, and senior scientist at the Marine Biological Laboratory, as well as a professor in the Department of Ecology and Evolutionary Biology at Brown University. He is known for his research on the behavior of cephalopods, particularly their camouflage abilities.
