= Lubin mine =

Mine in Poland

Coordinates: 51.4460°N 16.1232°E

Lubin Mine
- Interactive map of Lubin Mine
- Location: Lubin, Lubin County, Poland
- Products: Copper
- Opened: 1957
- Company: KGHM Polska Miedź

The Lubin Mine is a large mine in the west of Poland in Lubin, Lubin County, 347 km south-west of the capital, Warsaw. Lubin represents one of the largest copper and silver reserve in Poland having estimated reserves of 347 million tonnes of ore grading 1.26% copper and 58 g/tonnes silver. The annual ore production is around 7.3 million tonnes from which 92,000 tonnes of copper and 423 tonnes of silver are extracted.
