= Cüneyt Özdemir =

Turkish journalist, TV host and producer

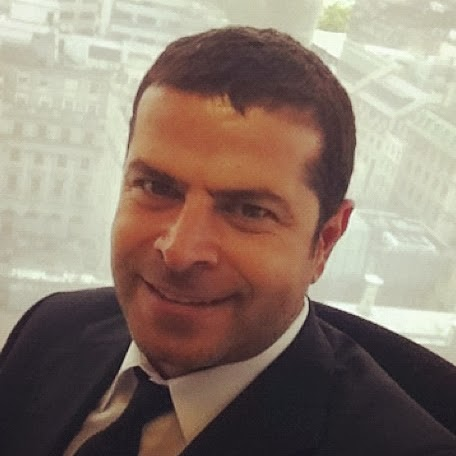
- Born: 8 February 1970 (age 56); Ankara, Turkey
- Citizenship: Turkish
- Education: Ankara University, School of Communication
- Occupations: Journalist, TV presenter, author, producer
- Years active: 1992-present
- Spouse: Zeynep İnanoğlu (m. 2011)
- Children: 1

Cüneyt Özdemir (born 8 February 1970) is a Turkish journalist, television host and producer. He began his career in 1992 as executive director of 32. Gün, and has been the anchorman of the local and foreign affairs program 5N1K, broadcast on CNN Türk, since 2000.

== Career ==
=== Early career ===
Özdemir started his journalism career in 1992 as the executive director of 32. Gün, produced and presented by Turkish journalist Mehmet Ali Birand.

In 1996, Özdemir became an international war correspondent, reporting from crises around the world including the Lebanese-Israeli border, Iraq and Afghanistan. Özdemir was given his first major assignment covering the Gulf War.

=== CNN Türk ===
In 1999, he helped found CNN Türk and in 2000, began producing 5N1K, an international news program combining hard and soft news from around the world. The program has won several journalism awards.

Over the years, Özdemir has reported on major stories from conflict zones including Iraq, Afghanistan, Pakistan, the Palestinian territories and Israel. He has also covered the 2004 Summer Olympics in Athens, and reported from Guantánamo Bay detention camp in Cuba (2006), the Nobel Prize Award Ceremony in Stockholm (2007), and the political chaos in Libya (2011), including an interview with Saif al-Islam Gaddafi, son of deposed leader Muammar Gaddafi.

Between 2012 and 2013 he presented the program from London. In 2014, he reported on the Israel-Palestine conflict from both Gaza and Tel Aviv.

=== Kanal D News and return to 5N1K ===
On 28 October 2014, Özdemir announced his departure from CNN Türk, to anchor the daily news bulletin on Kanal D. He hosted his first broadcast on 3 November 2014. On 7 August 2015, Kanal D announced Özdemir would be leaving his post as anchor of Kanal D, and returning to CNN Türk to resume his role at 5N1K.

In 2017, Özdemir reported daily on the Reza Zarrab case from in front of the courthouse, broadcasting live on his YouTube channel. He won the TV News Program Award from the Journalists Union of Turkey for his coverage.

In 2018, he presented Turkey's presidential election results live on his YouTube channel. The eight-hour broadcast was the most watched election program in Turkey, with 700,000 views. Before the election he interviewed various presidential candidates for his YouTube channel.

In 2019, he travelled to Caracas, Venezuela, to cover the socio-political crisis and attempted coup. While in Venezuela, he conducted an interview with Nicolas Maduro, the president's first interview after the coup attempt.

In March 2019, his seven-hour broadcast on the Istanbul mayoral election results was watched by 1.7 million viewers. He hosted the June 2019 Istanbul mayoral election show from the United States, which was watched by 1 million people and was the most watched election program that day.

At the end of 2019, Özdemir began broadcasting daily broadcasts about the COVID-19 pandemic on his YouTube channel.

=== Radikal newspaper ===
Between years 2011 and 2014, Özdemir wrote for Radikal newspaper. Özdemir wrote 5 days a week at his column at Radikal. He has written extensively on political affairs, global issues, pop-cultural developments, Middle East and Europe at this column.

=== Dipnot TV ===
Özdemir founded the production company Dipnot TV in 2008, which has produced 5N1K for many years, as well as Turkish TV series Sağır Oda between 2006 and 2007.

DIPNOT TV Company led by Cüneyt Özdemir continues to produce TV shows and documentaries. Özdemir created new business models in publicity, media and social media projects. His company also produces corporate promotion shootings, advertisements, viral videos both for internet and TV platforms as well as social media campaigns. Over the years Özdemir's production company has worked with numerous important clients including Akbank, Kalebodur, Turkcell, Vodafone, Google, Ericson, Coca-Cola, Efes Pilsen, Tuborg, Unilever, Chevrolet and so on.

Dipnot Production Company also undertook the production of a prominent European Union project called "We Have a Message". The company conducted this project with its partner Happy Idea and its participants TÜSEV (Turkish third sector trust) and Turk Journal. The project was carried out within the scope of civil society dialogue III/Media donation program. "We Have a Message" project aimed at ameliorating communities' perception and understanding of each other and also at increasing the participation of their citizens. The project also intended to emphasize the effects of European Union endorsements on social development with 8 short films and a documentary. Özdemir's company produced these films and documentaries.

The company is also a pioneer of digital media in Turkey. Özdemir launched the digital magazine Dipnot Tablet in 2009, focused on technology, entertainment and design. The online magazine Dipnot also covers politics and economics. Özdemir currently writes weekly articles for Dipnot Tablet.

== Personal life ==
Özdemir is married to Zeynep İnanoğlu. Their son was born in 2012.

His mother is of Turkish Meskhetian origin.

== Works ==
=== Documentary ===
- Özdemir, Cüneyt. Everyone's Father Has A Story To Tell. 2000
- Özdemir, Cüneyt. Money's Adventure. 2000
- Özdemir, Cüneyt. Gold Handcuff to Water. 2000
- Özdemir, Cüneyt. Maiden's Tower Legend. CNN Türk. 2000
- Özdemir, Cüneyt. The Man Who Last Laughed: Kemal Sunal. 2001
- Özdemir, Cüneyt. Football's Turkey Journey. CNN Türk, 2002
- Özdemir, Cüneyt. Festival.
- Özdemir, Cüneyt. Love For Cars. CNN Türk, 2002

=== TV series ===
- Sağır Oda (The Deaf Room) producer

=== TV programs ===
- 32. Gün (32nd Day)
- 5N1K
- Soruyorum (I Am Asking)
- Fark Yaratanlar (Changemakers)
- An Extraordinary Day

=== Books ===
- Özdemir, Cüneyt. Commander's Suspicious Death, Eşref Bitlis Case. İletişim Yayınları, 1988. ISBN 9786051119212
- Özdemir, Cüneyt. State of Mind. Parantez Publications, 1998. ISBN 9789757939726
- Özdemir, Cüneyt. Sound of Delusion. Parantez Publications, 1999. ISBN 9789757939986
- Özdemir, Cüneyt. Talks Without Ratings. Su Publications, 2000. ISBN 9789756709078
- Özdemir, Cüneyt. Maiden's Tower Legend. Su Publications, 2001. ISBN 9789756709139
- Özdemir, Cüneyt. I Was With Them But I Wasn't From Them. Doğan Books, 2003. ISBN 9789752931534
- Özdemir, Cüneyt. Out Of Focus. Yapı Kredi Publication, 2005. ISBN 9789750808937
- Özdemir, Cüneyt. Half Mind of Mine. 40 Haramiler Yayınları, 2006. ISBN 9789750070501
- Özdemir, Cüneyt. The Cage Of Hell. Doğan Kitap, 2007. ISBN 9789752935259
- Özdemir, Cüneyt. Agency Of High Affairs. Doğan Kitap, 2000. ISBN 9786051111193
- Özdemir, Cüneyt. Country That Has Lost Its Joy. Doğan Kitap, 2014. ISBN 9786050922745
- Özdemir, Cüneyt. "A Nation Is Standing: 15 July Testimonies". Doğan Kitap, 2016. ISBN 9786050937091
- Özdemir, Cüneyt. "Sunflower: Words Dried By Summer Sun". Doğan Kitap, 2018. ISBN 9786050951783
