= Mithat Bereket =

Turkish journalist

- Born: October 10, 1966 (age 59); Ankara, Turkey
- Education: University of Ankara
- Occupation: Journalist

Mithat Bereket (born October 10, 1966) is a Turkish journalist born October 10, 1966, in Ankara, Turkey.

Bereket attended Ankara College. After graduating high school, he furthered his education at the University of Ankara, Faculty of Political Sciences, Department of International Relations. Graduating with a degree in International Relations.

Bereket's profession as a roving reporter and war correspondent allows him to travel extensively around the world, in search for new major news stories. Stories he has followed in the past have been the first Gulf War, the war in Bosnia, the Afghan War, the tensions in Algeria, the conflict in Karabagh, the war in Chechnya, the Palestinian Intifada, the war in Kosovo, NATO intervention in Kosovo and the War In Iraq.

Bereket has held several exclusive interviews with leaders, politicians, opinion-makers and other prominent public figures, which include Nelson Mandela, Benazir Bhutto, Bill and Hillary Clinton, Muammar Gaddafi, Mahmoud Ahmadinejad, Yasser Arafat, Shimon Peres, Yitzhak Rabin, Madeleine Albright, Henry Kissinger, Gerhard Schröder, Benjamin Netanyahu, Mikhail Kalashnikov, King Abdullah of Jordan, Walid Jumblatt, Mohamed ElBaradei, Brent Scowcroft, Shamil Basayev, Edita Tahiri, Hashim Thaçi, Boutros Boutros-Ghali, Jalal Talabani, and Masoud Barzani.

== Education ==
Bereket graduated from the University of Ankara with a degree in International Relations. He earned his M.A. from Lancaster University, Department of International Relations, in England. His master's dissertation was on Cyprus.

Bereket lectures at the Pusula Academy (Compass Academy) of the Communications Faculty of Kadir Has University in Istanbul. He also gives lectures in the Newmedia Department within the same university.

== Other accomplishments ==
Bereket played basketball collegiately, and then later at the national level, representing Turkey.

He also hosted a drive-time morning-radio show in Best-FM, named “Sesli Gazete” (Vocal Newspaper) for 7 years. He has directed and presented many successful documentaries.

During his 24 years of experience as a TV journalist, Bereket has taken part in the coverage of a number of major events as the main anchorman for Turkish news channel NTV. These events include U.S. President Bill Clinton’s visit to Turkey, the OSCE Summit in Istanbul, the Helsinki Summit of the European Union, general elections in Greece, the elections in Cyprus, the elections in the U.S. and the World Trade Center attacks in New York, the EU Summit in Luxemburg.

Bereket hosts the bi-weekly news and foreign affairs documentary "PUSULA," which means "Compass". Pusula has been on air for 15 years and is being broadcast on TRT1, Turkey's national public broadcasting network. Before joining the TRT, Bereket hosted a daily primetime news program, +Bir, ("Plus One") for CNN Turk.
