= Lubin Town Hall =

Local government building in Poland

Coordinates: 51.3971°N 16.2056°E

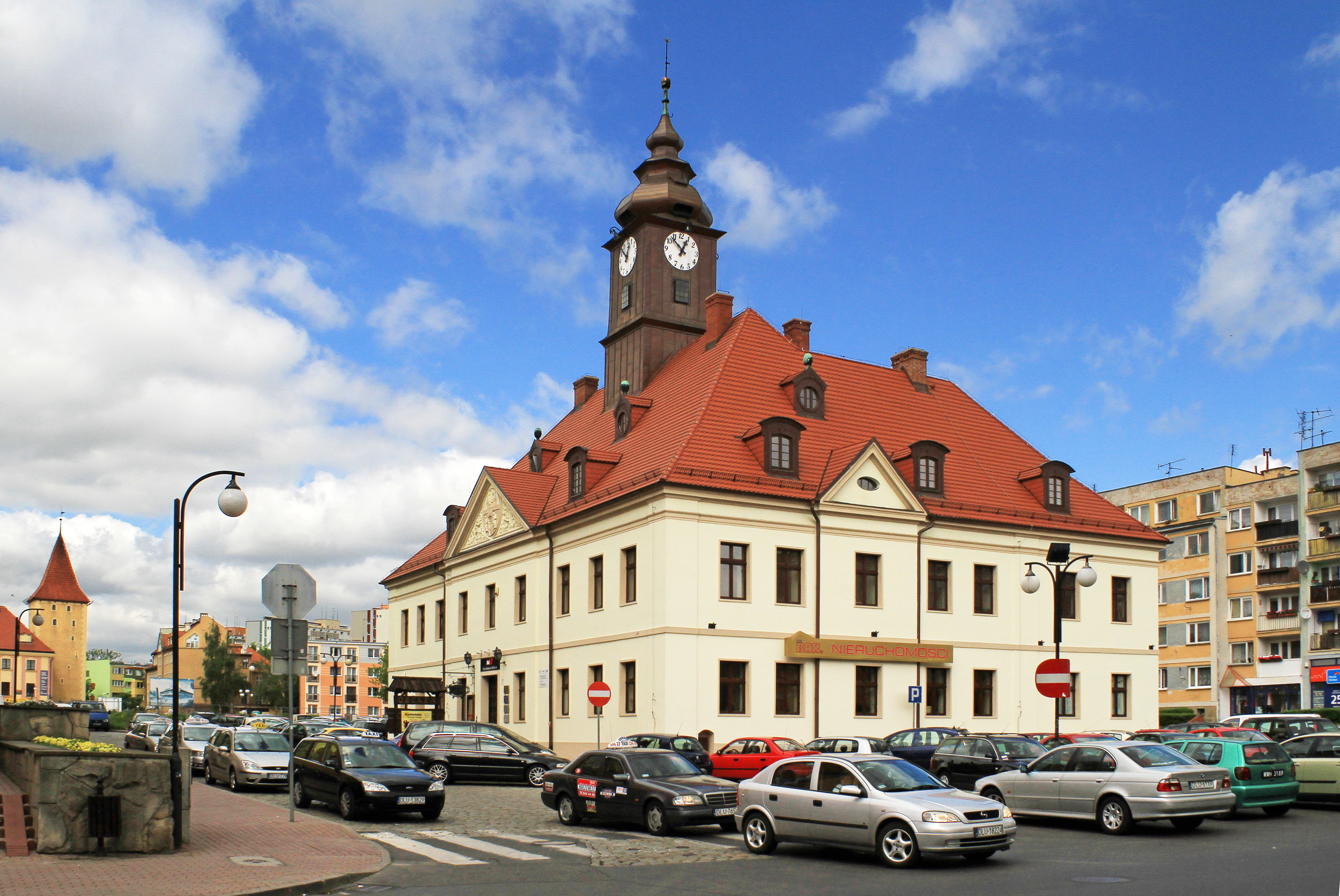
Town hall of Lubin

The town hall of Lubin in Lubin, Poland, was built in 1768 in Baroque style and rebuilt in the 19th century. The building was destroyed in 1945 and then rebuilt in 1950. Currently the town hall is a seat of the Historical Museum in Lubin, as well as the mayor and the city council.

== History ==
The first Renaissance town hall in Lubin was built in 1515, during a major expansion of the town. It was destroyed in a fire in 1757 and then demolished. The current building was erected in 1768. The building was significantly reconstructed in the 19th and 20th centuries. The town hall was severely damaged in 1945 during the war and was rebuilt in 1950, losing much of its original character. In 2010, the building was restored and its tower was covered with copper sheet.

By the decision of the provincial conservator dated 14 April 1981, the town hall was entered into the register of monuments.

== Architecture ==
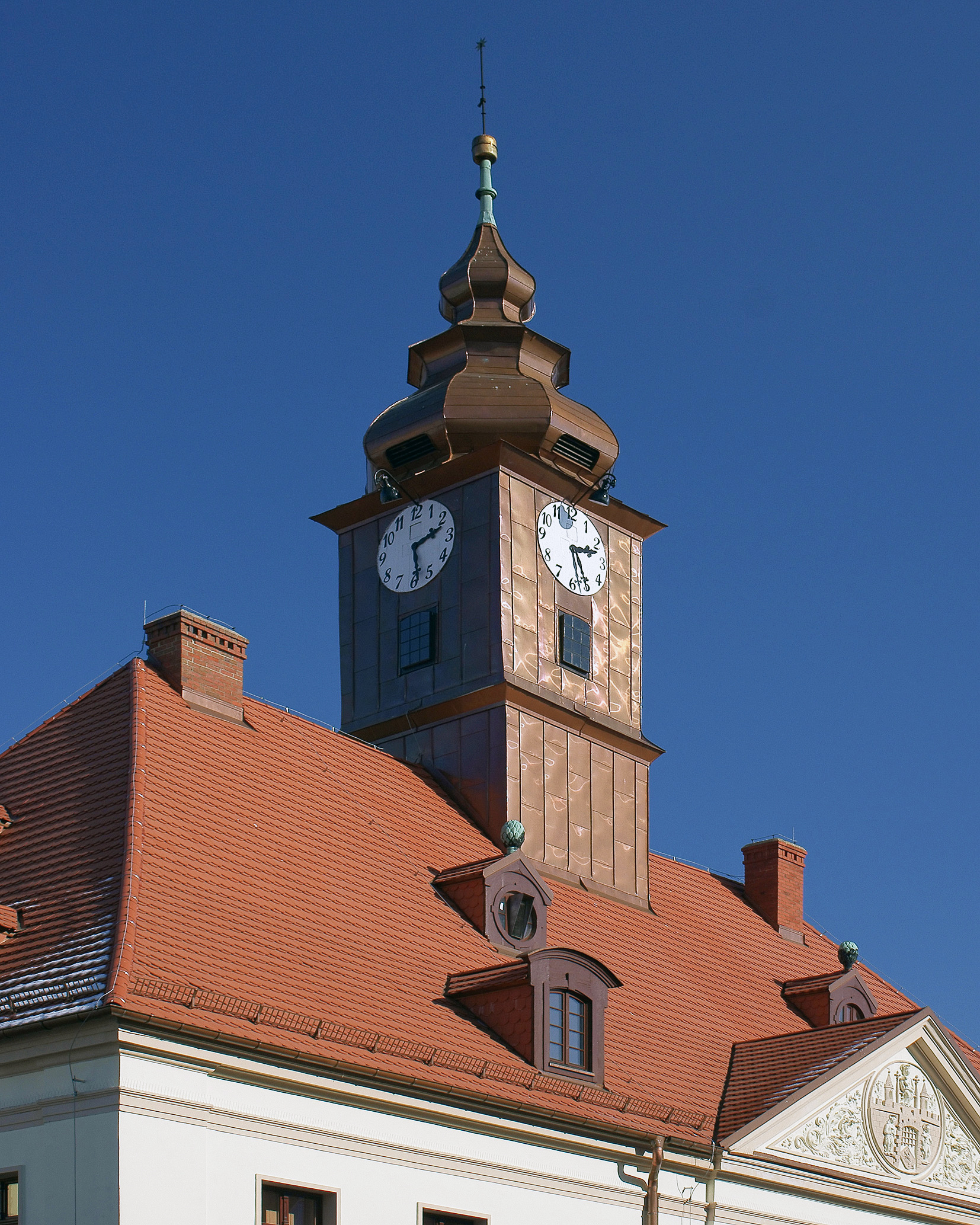
Tower

The town hall is a late Baroque building built on a rectangular plan, with two storeys and a mansard hipped roof with dormers. The ridge is topped with a copper sheet metal turret with clocks and a Baroque helmet with a spire. The elevations are enriched with shallow risalits topped with triangular pediments. The risalit on the western façade has a tympanum with the town's coat of arms depicted among floral ornaments.

== Literature ==
- Pilch J., Leksykon zabytków architektury Dolnego Śląska, Warszawa: Wydawnictwo Arkady, 2005, ISBN 83-213-4366-X, OCLC 69480077.
- Roman Pawlak, "Zabytkowe ratusze", Warszawa, MUZA SA, 2003, ISBN 83-7200-991-0.
