= Halk TV =

Turkish television channel

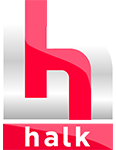
- Country: Turkey
- Affiliates: Radyoaktif Bursa
- Headquarters: Ankara, Turkey

Programming
- Language: Turkish
- Picture format: 16:9 (1080i, HDTV)

History
- Launched: 2005

Links
- Website: www.halktv.com.tr

Availability

Streaming media
- Internet: Live Stream

Halk TV is a Turkish Free-to-air nationwide TV channel established in 2005. It is known for its relationship with the Republican People's Party (CHP), although the previous links were cut off in 2011 under the new CHP leader Kemal Kılıçdaroğlu. The Gezi Park protests brought Halk TV into the spotlight as one of the few Turkish television channels to broadcast live coverage of the events. Because of this the media regulator, the Radio and Television Supreme Council (RTÜK), imposed a fine on Halk TV for "harming the physical, moral and mental development of children and young people". Since October 2026 it has been taken over by the government.

In June 2025, the Turkish Attorney General issued an arrest warrant against London based Cafer Mahiroğlu.

== History ==
Halk TV was established in 2005 "by former CHP accountant Mahmut Yıldız", and received some funding from the CHP. When Kemal Kılıçdaroğlu took over the CHP leadership in 2011, the party cut its funding, leading to severe financial difficulties for Halk TV. Kılıçdaroğlu also asked CHP deputies and members not to appear as guests on the station. Former Esenyurt Mayor Gürbüz Çapan was linked with Halk TV in 2011. In May 2013, Halk TV was reprimanded by the media regulator RTÜK for broadcasting a "most watched" video from YouTube which it said was aimed at humiliating PM Recep Tayyip Erdoğan.

In early 2020, Halk TV was sold to businessman Cafer Mahiroğlu. In January 2025, the station's chief editor Serhan Asker was detained along with presenter Seda Selek and independent journalist Baris Pehlivan after the station aired a phone conversation between Pehlivan and a court-appointed expert accused of bias against mayors belonging to the opposition Republican People's Party.

== Government takeover ==
On 14 October 2026, Turkish authorities raided Halk TV headquarters in Istanbul and appointed a state trustee to take over the channel's administration, suspending its broadcast. The operation was part of a financial crime investigation into the channel's owner, Cafer Mahiroğlu, who was suspected of bribery, bid rigging and money laundering. Authorities detained 11 people in connection with the investigation. Mahiroğlu who was reportedly abroad, was not among them. The channels editor in chief Suat Toktaş, unsuccessfully requested to continue live broadcast. The takeover was condemned by opposition leader Özgür Özel, who described it as an attack on press freedom. Following the takeover, the channel began broadcasting religious content and prayers, while Halk TV reporters continued to broadcast live on on YouTube.

Amnesty International called the incident a "brutal blow to media freedom" and demanded the government to restore the channel's independent operations. DW News pointed out that the takeover was politically-motivated as the raid came on the same day as the imprisoned mayor of Istanbul Ekrem İmamoğlu was to begin his defence in the court. For the public, Halk TV served as an important source of information for the case.

About a month later, Sözcü Media Group was raided by police forces and a trustee management was placed instead of the previous management.

== Viewers ==
As of 2018, Fox TV and CNN Türk are also preferred by CHP and İyi Party supporters. However, it has also been described as "non-aligned". Some Alevis prefer news from Halk TV.
