= Mehmet Ali Birand =

Turkish journalist (1941–2013)

- Born: 9 December 1941; Beyoğlu, Istanbul, Turkey
- Died: 17 January 2013 (aged 71); Şişli, Istanbul, Turkey
- Education: Galatasaray High School
- Occupations: Journalist, political commentator, and writer
- Years active: 1964–2013

Mehmet Ali Birand (9 December 1941 – 17 January 2013) was a Turkish journalist, political commentator, and writer.

== Biography ==
Birand was born to İzzet and his wife Mürvet on 9 December 1941 in Beyoğlu. From his mother's side he was of Kurdish descent from Palu, Elazığ. His father, Şerif Bey, settled in Ereğli, Zonguldak, and married a woman there named Seniye Hanım. Birand's maternal uncle was a diplomat, Mahmut Dikerdem.

Birand completed his high school education at Galatasaray High School.

Birand began his journalism career in 1964 by writing for the newspaper Milliyet. In 1992, he joined Show TV as a news presenter. Birand began hosting a political show titled 32. Gün (The 32nd Day), which was first on TRT in 1985 and then moved to other private TV channels such as CNN Türk and Show TV. He also presented the daily news on CNN Türk. Before his death in 2013, he worked at Kanal D, hosting the news.

Birand also authored several books including 30 Sıcak Gün, Diyet, Türkiye'nin Avrupa Macerası, 12 Eylül 04.00 and Emret Komutanım.

Birand was also a member of Galatasaray's Board and Uncommitted Governance Council.

In 2006, Birand said that the Gendarmerie Intelligence Organization had asked Mahmut Yıldırım (Yeşil) to assassinate him, but that the operation was later cancelled, after Yıldırım had already investigated Birand's home security. Birand said that MIT chief Şenkal Atasagun was one of those who had told him of this episode.

Birand died on 17 January 2013, aged 71, in Şişli, from complications of gallbladder surgery to replace a stent at the American Hospital in Istanbul. He had been receiving cancer treatment for a while.

== Newspapers worked for ==
- 1964–1992 Milliyet
- 1992–1998 Sabah
- 1999–2013 Posta
- 2001–2013 Hürriyet
- 2001–2011 Milliyet

== Works ==
- Diyet
- Türkiye'nin Avrupa Macerası
- 30 Sıcak Gün
- 12 Eylül 04.00
  - in English: The Generals' Coup in Turkey: An Inside Story of 12 September 1980
- Emret Komutanım
- 32. Gün
- 10 Yılın Perde Arkası
- Mehmet Ali Birand
- Milliyet Yayınları / Aktüel Kitaplar Dizisi
- Nasreddin Hodja
