= Ciner Wyoming =

Ciner Wyoming LLC
- Company type: Private company
- Industry: Mining, chemicals
- Founded: 2015; 11 years ago
- Founder: Stauffer Chemical
- Headquarters: Green River, Wyoming, United States
- Products: Soda ash products
- Owner: Ciner Holding

The Ciner Wyoming LCC is a mining and chemical industry company based in Wyoming, United States, producing natural soda ash from trona. The initial company was founded in 1962. Since 2015, it is under the control of the Turkish Ciner Holding.

== Background ==
In 1962, Big Island Mine and Refinery was founded by the Stauffer Chemical Company to produces soda ash from the mined trona. In 1984, mining method was changed from conventional drilling and blasting mining to continuous mining. The company was acquired by Chesebrough Pond's in 1985. The next year, the company was sold to the British Imperial Chemical Industries (ICI) after Chesebrough Pond's was acquired by the Anglo-Dutch company Unilever. In 1987, already one year later, the French chemical and pharmaceutical company Rhône-Poulenc bought the ICI interests in the soda ash production section of Stauffer Chemical. The company was sold to OCI Chemical Corporation, a subsidiary of the South Korea-based OCI Company Ltd in 1996. The production capacity was increased about one million tons of soda ash when an automated unit was pot into service in 1998. Dual fuel calcination became available in 2007. Overall plant efficiency was increased by recovering soda ash from the mine dump ponds in a newly built Decahydrate plant in 2009. In 2013, the company shares were listed on the New York Stock Exchange under the ticker symbol OCIR.

In 2015, Ciner Enterprises Inc., a subsidiary of the Turkish Ciner Holding acquired OCI Chemical Corporation, which was later renamed to Ciner Resources Corporation. 49% interest in Ciner Wyoming LLC is held by Natural Resource Partners.

== Plant and production ==
Ciner Wyoming is located at Green River in Sweetwater County of Wyoming, United States. The company extracts trona using room and pillar mining method. After trona ore is conveyed to the surface, it is processed into dense soda ash (sodium carbonate, Na_{2}CO_{3}). Mining operations are carried out on an area of approximately 23,500 acres (9,500 ha), and for the surface operations 880 acres (360 ha) are available.

Green River Basin in Wyoming has the highest purity, largest and most accessible underground trona ore deposit in the world. Mining operations are carried out in two separate deposit beds at depths of 800–1,100 ft (240–340 m). The extent of the proven and probable reserves are 263,500,000 short tons (239,000,000 t), which is equivalent to 143,600,000 short tons (130,300,000 t) of soda ash. The reserve life is reported to be well more than 60 years based upon current production rates.

Soda ash is used as a raw material in a variety of industrial products and consumer goods, including glass (47%), chemicals (30%), soap (7%), and paper. Other products are sodium percarbonate (2 Na_{2}CO_{3} · 3 H_{2}O_{2}), hydrogen peroxide (H_{2}O_{2}), and other chemicals to soap and detergent production.

Global competitors in the field of soda ash are Tronox (United States), Solvay S.A. (Belgium), Tata Chemicals (India) and Searles Valley Mineralss, United States. Ciner Holding also owns two companies in Turkey, Eti Soda and Kazan Soda Elektrik, which produce natural soda ash.

== See also ==
- Eti Soda
- Kazan Soda Elektrik
