= Kazakovite =

Pale yellow radioactive mineral

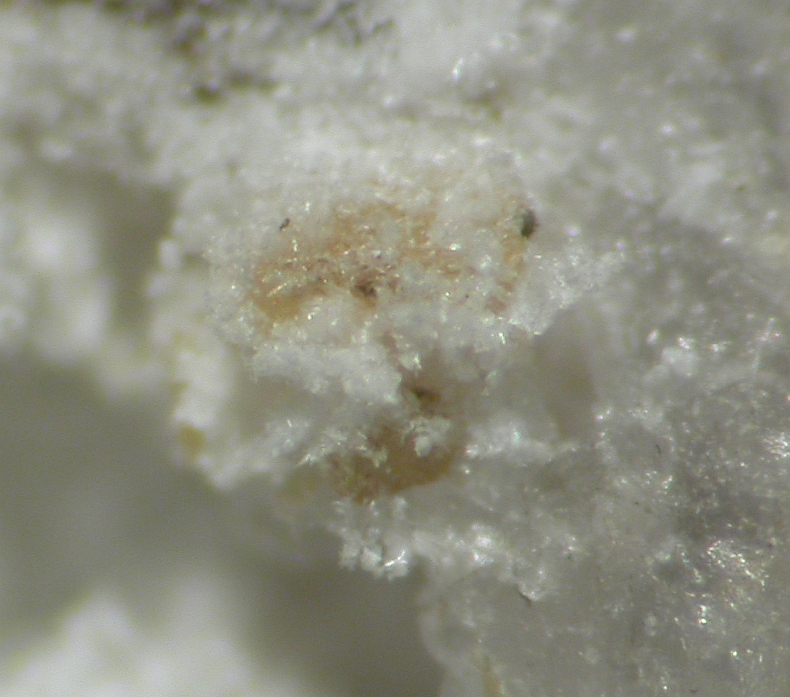
- Yellow kazakovite with white thermonatrite

General
- Category: Cyclosilicate minerals
- Formula: Na_{6}Mn^{2+}Ti(Si_{6}O_{18})
- IMA symbol: Kzk
- Strunz classification: 9.CJ.15a
- Dana classification: 61.1.2a.2
- Crystal system: Trigonal
- Crystal class: Hexagonal scalenohedral H-M symbol: (3 2/m)
- Space group: R 3̅m
- Unit cell: 1,168.92

Identification
- Color: Pale yellow
- Twinning: Simple, complex, and polysynthetic twins, axis normal to (112̅4)
- Cleavage: None
- Fracture: Irregular/uneven, conchoidal
- Mohs scale hardness: 4
- Luster: Vitreous, greasy
- Streak: White
- Diaphaneity: Transparent
- Specific gravity: 2.84
- Density: 2.84
- Optical properties: Uniaxial (−)
- Refractive index: n_{ω} = 1.648 – 1.650 n_{ε} = 1.625 – 1.638
- Birefringence: 0.023
- Common impurities: Al, Fe, Nb, Mg, Ca, K, P, H_{2}O
- Other characteristics: Radioactive

Kazakovite is a cyclosilicate mineral named in honor of analytical chemist Maria Efimovna Kazakova. It is a type locality of Karnasurt mountain, Lovozersky District, Murmansk Oblast, Russia. It was approved by the IMA in 1974, the same year it was discovered.

== Properties ==
Kazakovite is a cation-saturated member of the lovozerite group and the zirsinalite-lovozerite subgroup. It occurs in sodalite syenites, and disseminated in ussingite. X-ray studies show the mineral to be rhombohedral. It occurs as small crystals (0.01 – 2 mm), and is showing the forms {112̅1} and {112̅4}. Kazakovite mainly consists of oxygen (44.59%), silicon (25.65%) and sodium (19.58%), but also contains titanium (4.45%), manganese (3.40%), iron (1.73%) and potassium (0.61%). It has a barely detectable, 8.56 radioactivity measured in Gamma Ray American Petroleum Institute Units. It is radioactive due to containing potassium, even though in low amounts. The concentration measured in GRapi is 11.68%.

== Tisinalite ==
After its discovery, it was quickly noticed Kazakovite is unstable in air. The mineral became covered in efflorescence of natron and thermonatrite after several days in room conditions. After special experimental studies, it was found that Kazakovite alters in air into H-kazakovite, better known as tisinalite. The process is complete after several weeks of exposure to moist air.
