= Ciner =

Ciner is a surname. Notable people with the surname include:

- Al Ciner (born 1947), American guitarist
- Turgay Ciner (born 1956), Turkish businessman

- Ciner Group, Turkish company owned by Turgay
