= Kazan Soda Elektrik =

Chemical industry and electric energy company in Ankara

- Native name: Kazan Soda Elektrik Üretim A.Ş.
- Type: Private company
- Industry: Chemicals
- Founded: 2010; 16 years ago
- Headquarters: Ankara, Turkey
- Area served: Worldwide
- Products: Soda ash; Baking soda
- Owner: Ciner Holding
- Number of employees: 1,000
- Website: www.kazansoda.com

Kazan Soda Elektrik Logo

The Kazan Soda Elektrik, full name Kazan Soda Elektrik Üretim A.Ş., is a chemical industry and electric energy company in Ankara Province, Turkey producing natural soda ash and baking soda from trona. The company is a subsidiary of Ciner Holding.

== Background ==
The trona ore deposits were owned by Rio Tinto Group, an Australian-British multinational and one of the world's largest metals and mining corporation. After survey activities, which lasted more than fifteen years, the company concluded that it will be unable to operate the mining of the trona ore reserves there, and sold the deposits to Ciner Holding in 2010.

The construction of the soda products plant began in 2015, after five years of efforts for bureaucratic permissions and financing. The investment budget of the project was US$1.5 billion. The financing of the project was provided by the Industrial and Commercial Bank of China (ICBC), Exim Bank of China and Deutsche Bank backed by the China Export and Credit Insurance Corporation (Sinosure). Sberbank of Russia financially contributed during the groundbreaking phase. The construction of the facility was carried out by the China Tianchen Engineering Corporation (TCC). The facility was completed within two and half years. Kazan Soda Elektrik plant was inaugurated on January 15, 2018, in presence of Turkish President Recep Tayyip Erdoğan, Minister of Energy and Natural Resources Berat Albayrak, Minister of Labour and Social Security Jülide Sarıeroğlu, Ambassador of China Yu Hongyang and many other high-profile politicians and officials.

== Plant and production ==
The Kazan Soda Elektrik consists of three sections, namely mining, processing and cogeneration. While the mining area is located in Kahramankazan district, the production plant is situated within the Sincan district of Ankara Province, northwest of Ankara. It is about 35 km (22 mi) north of Ankara.

The plant's mining section supplies the processing section with the trona solution (trisodium hydrogendicarbonate dihydrat), which is the primary source of soda ash. For this, trona ore, laying in average at a depth of 600 m (2,000 ft) underground, is injected with hot water through boreholes drilled, and the dissolved trona is pumped up in the form of trona solution. The plant has five processing lines. The congeneration facility produces 380 MWe electric power and 400 tons of steam.

The annual production capacity of the plant is 2.5 million tons of soda ash (sodium carbonate, Na_{2}CO_{3}) and 200,000 tons of baking soda (sodium bicarbonate, NaHCO_{3}). If all the production were exported to Europe, it would increase the key glass raw material by around 25%. Around 1,000 people are employed by the company.

The trona ore reserve of Kazan Soda Elektrik is the world's second largest. The plant is the biggest soda ash production facility in Europe. With both Kazan Soda and Eti Soda, the Ciner Holding and Turkey becomes the leading soda ash producer of the world. The soda ash produced has a purity grade of 99.8%, which is the purest in the world. The total annual export value of the products from Kazan Soda Elektrik and Eti Soda will be US$800 million.

== Sustainability ==
The company has published a report by CDP scoring their environmental impact. Their scope 1 and 2 emissions intensity in 2019 was 0.345 tonnes CO2e per tonne of product. However, the first implementation of the EU Carbon Border Adjustment Mechanism does not include soda.

== See also ==
- Eti Soda, Turkey
- Ciner Wyoming, United States
