= Shortite =

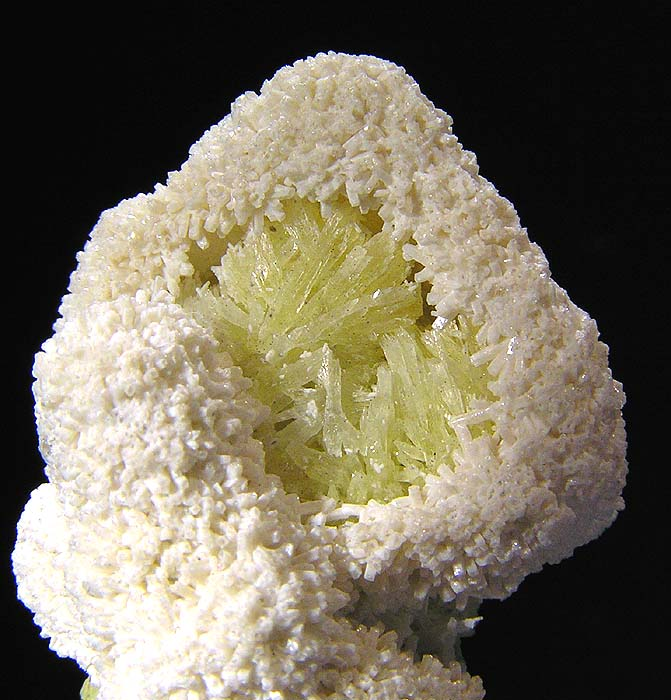

General
- Category: Carbonate minerals
- Formula: Na_{2}Ca_{2}(CO_{3})_{3}
- IMA symbol: Sot
- Strunz classification: 5.AC.25
- Crystal system: Orthorhombic
- Crystal class: Pyramidal (mm2); H-M symbol: (mm2)
- Space group: Amm2

Identification
- Colour: Colourless, light yellow, light green
- Cleavage: Distinct/good on {010}
- Fracture: Conchoidal
- Mohs scale hardness: 3
- Lustre: Vitreous
- Diaphaneity: Transparent
- Specific gravity: 2.6
- Density: 2.6
- Optical properties: Biaxial (−)
- Refractive index: n_{α} = 1.531 n_{β} = 1.555 n_{γ} = 1.570
- Birefringence: 0.039
- Dispersion: r < v moderate

Shortite is a sodium-calcium carbonate mineral, with the chemical formula Na_{2}Ca_{2}(CO_{3})_{3}. It was discovered by J. J. Fahey in well cuttings from the Green River Formation, Sweetwater County, Wyoming, US, and was named to honor Maxwell N. Short (1889–1952), Professor of Mineralogy, University of Arizona.

Shortite is associated with commercial trona ores, and some care must be taken when beneficiating crude trona to avoid contamination with shortite.

== See also ==
- Aragonite
- Calcite
- Nahcolite
- Natron
- Sodium sesquicarbonate
- Thermonatrite
- Trona
- Vaterite
