= Natron =

Carbonate mineral

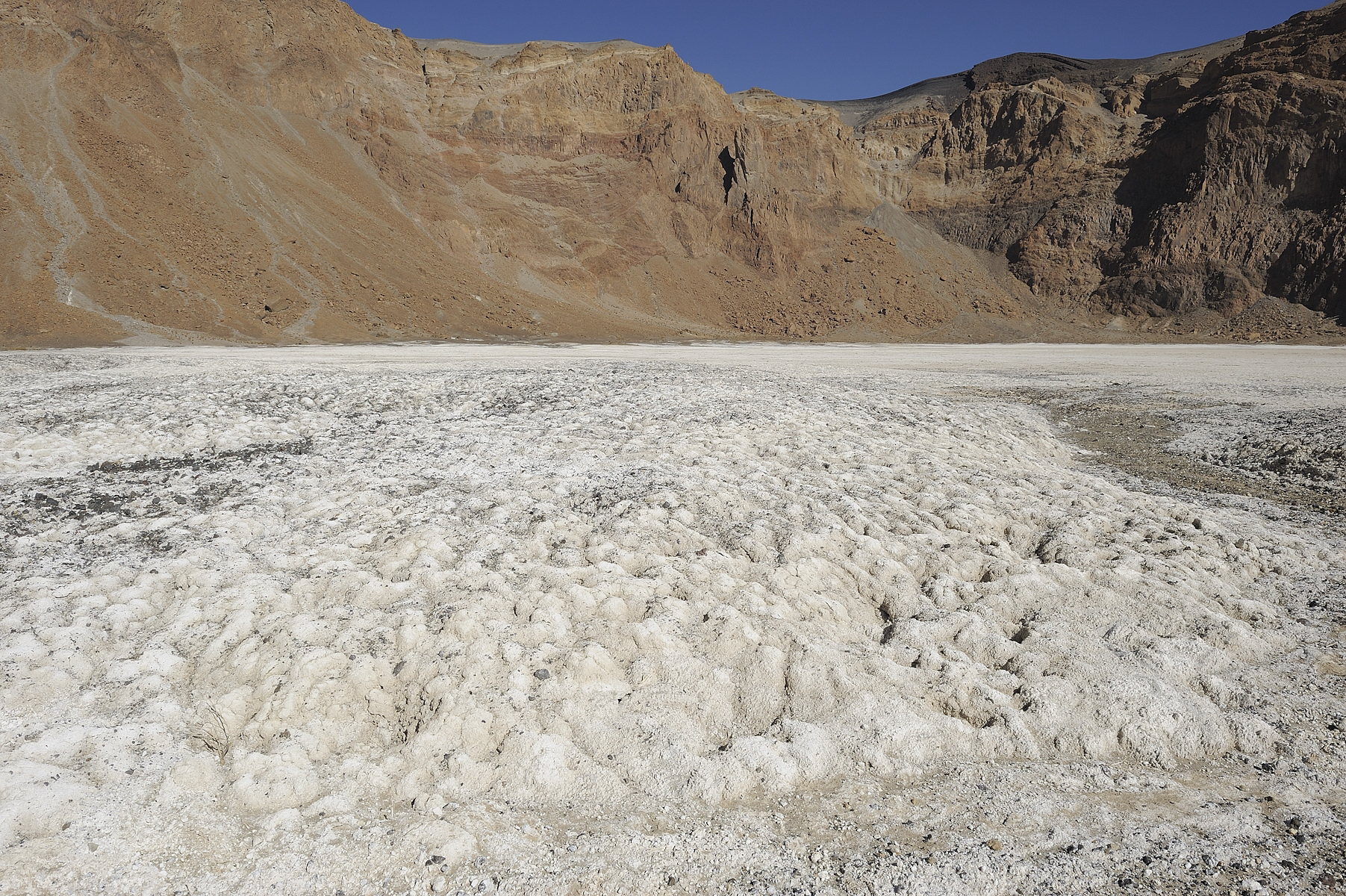
- Natron deposits in the Era Kohor crater in the Tibesti Mountains, Chad

General
- Category: Carbonate mineral
- Formula: Na_{2}CO_{3}·10H_{2}O
- IMA symbol: Nt
- Strunz classification: 5.CB.10
- Dana classification: 15.01.02.01
- Crystal system: Monoclinic
- Crystal class: Prismatic (2/m) (same H-M symbol)
- Space group: P2/m
- Unit cell: a = 12.75 Å, b = 9 Å, c = 12.6 Å β = 115.85°

Identification
- Colour: Colourless to white, greyish, yellowish; colourless in transmitted light.
- Crystal habit: crystalline, granular, and columnar crusts
- Twinning: on {001}
- Cleavage: On {001} distinct; on {010} imperfect; on {110} in traces.
- Fracture: Conchoidal
- Tenacity: Brittle
- Mohs scale hardness: 1 – 1.5
- Lustre: Vitreous
- Streak: White
- Diaphaneity: Transparent to translucent
- Specific gravity: 1.478
- Optical properties: Biaxial (−)
- Refractive index: n_{α} = 1.405 n_{β} = 1.425 n_{γ} = 1.440
- Birefringence: δ = 0.035
- 2V angle: Measured: 71°, Calculated: 80°
- Solubility: Soluble in water

Natron is a naturally occurring mixture of sodium carbonate decahydrate (Na_{2}CO_{3}·10H_{2}O, a kind of soda ash) and around 17% sodium bicarbonate (also called baking soda, NaHCO_{3}) along with small quantities of sodium chloride and sodium sulfate. Natron is white to colourless when pure, varying to gray or yellow with impurities. Natron deposits are sometimes found in saline lake beds which arose in arid environments. Throughout history natron has had many practical applications that continue today in the wide range of modern uses of its constituent mineral components.

In modern mineralogy the term natron has come to mean only the sodium carbonate decahydrate (hydrated soda ash) that makes up most of the historical salt.

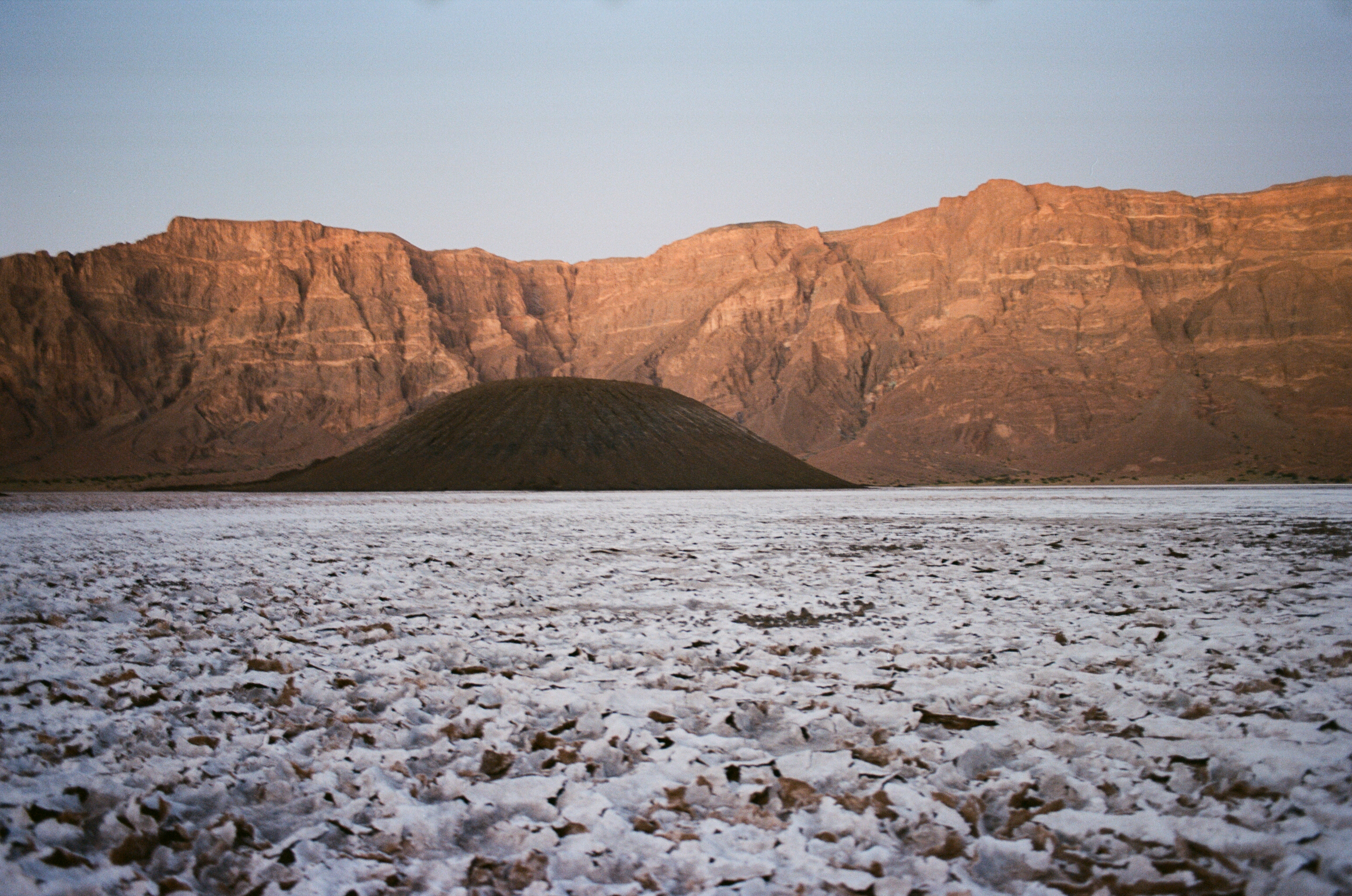
Natron deposits, Trou au Natron, Tibesti, Chad

== Etymology ==
The English and German word natron is a French cognate derived through the Spanish natrón from Latin natrium and Greek nitron (νίτρον). This derives from the Ancient Egyptian word nṯrj. Natron refers to Wadi El Natrun or Natron Valley in Egypt, from which natron was mined by the ancient Egyptians for use in burial rites. The modern chemical symbol for sodium, Na, is an abbreviation of that element's Neo-Latin name natrium, which was derived from natron. The name of the chemical element nitrogen is also a cognate to natron, it derives from the Greek nitron and -gen (a suffix meaning "producer of", in this case of nitric acid, which was produced from niter or [nitre] [potassium nitrate]). Niter is also an obsolete name for natron because in earlier times, both minerals used to be confused with each other.

== Importance in antiquity ==
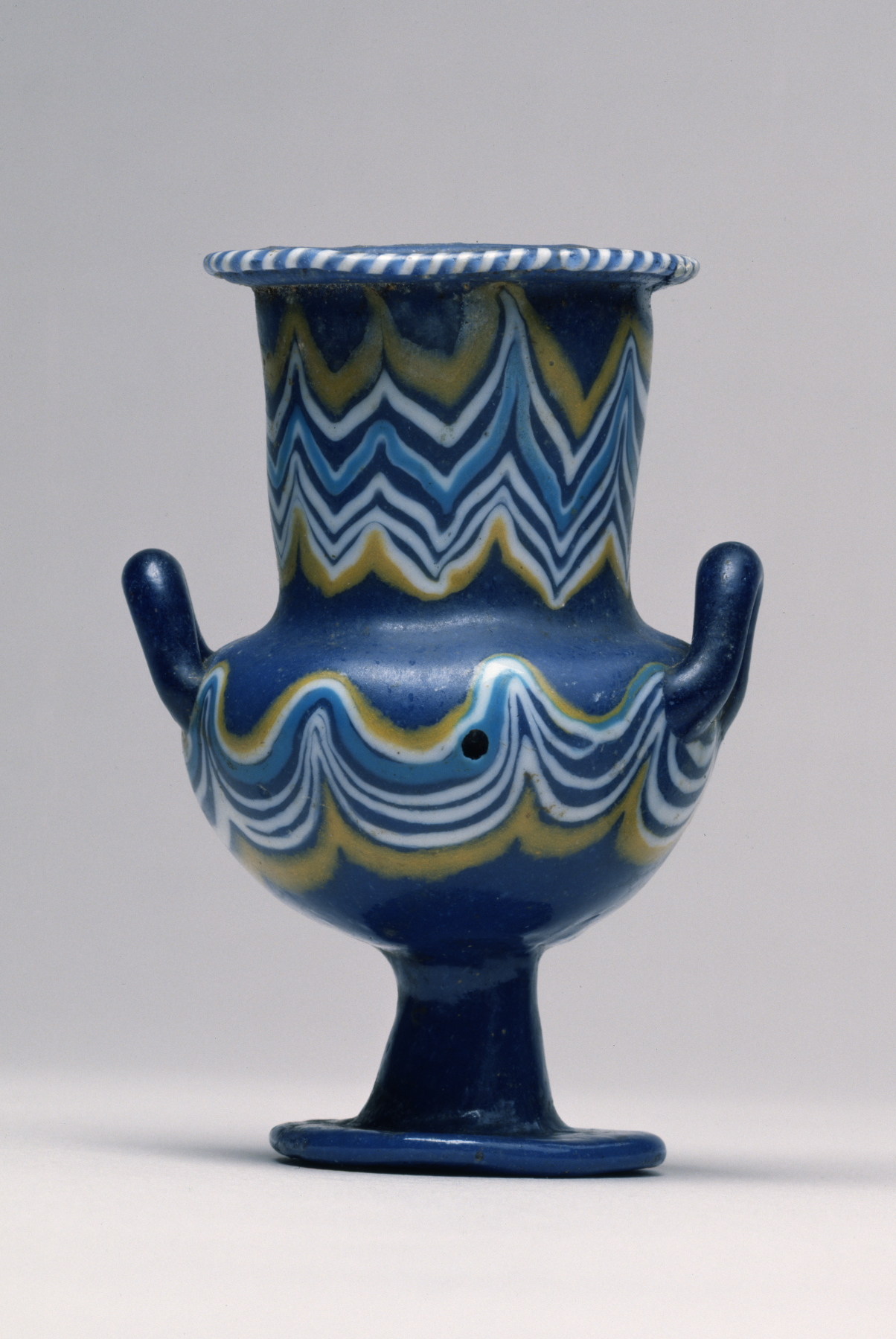
A faience vase fabricated in part from natron, dating to the New Kingdom of Egypt (c. 1450–1350 BC)

Historical natron was harvested directly as a salt mixture from dry lake beds in ancient Egypt, and has been used for thousands of years as a cleaning product for both the home and body. Blended with oil, it was an early form of soap. It softens water while removing oil and grease. Undiluted, natron was a cleanser for the teeth and an early mouthwash. The mineral was mixed into early antiseptics for wounds and minor cuts. Natron can be used to dry and preserve fish and meat. It was also an ancient household insecticide, and was used for making leather as well as a bleach for clothing.

The mineral was used during mummification ceremonies in ancient Egypt because it absorbs water and behaves as a drying agent. Moreover, when exposed to moisture, the carbonate in natron increases pH (raises alkalinity), which creates a hostile environment for bacteria. In some cultures, natron was thought to enhance spiritual safety for both the living and the dead. Natron was added to castor oil to make a smokeless fuel, which allowed Egyptian artisans to paint elaborate artworks inside ancient tombs without staining them with soot.

The Pyramid Texts describe how natron pellets were used as funerary offerings in the rites for the pharaoh "N". The ceremony required two kinds of natron: one sourced from northern (Lower) Egypt and one from southern (Upper) Egypt.

Smin, smin opens thy mouth. One pellet of natron.
O N., thou shalt taste its taste in front of the sḥ-ntr-chapels. One pellet of natron.
That which Horus spits out is smin. One pellet of natron.
That which Set spits out is smin. One pellet of natron.
That which the two harmonious gods (spit out) is smin. One pellet of natron.
To say four times: Thou hast purified thyself with natron, together with Horus (and) the Followers of Horus. Five pellets of natron from Nekheb, Upper Egypt.
Thou purifiest (thyself); Horus purifies (himself). One pellet of natron. Thou purifiest (thyself); Set purifies (himself). One pellet of natron.
Thou purifiest (thyself); Thot purifies (himself). One pellet of natron. Thou purifiest (thyself); the god purifies (himself). One pellet of natron.
Thou also purifiest (thyself)—thou who art among them. One pellet of natron.
Thy mouth is the mouth of a sucking calf on the day of his birth.
Five pellets of natron of the North, Wadi Natrûn (št-p.t)

Natron is an ingredient in the making of a distinct color called Egyptian blue, and also as the flux in Egyptian faience. It was used along with sand and lime in ceramic and glass making by the Romans and others until at least AD 640. The mineral was also employed as a flux to solder precious metals together.

=== Decline in use ===
Most of natron's uses both in the home and by industry were gradually replaced with closely related sodium compounds and minerals. Natron's detergent properties are now commercially supplied by soda ash (pure sodium carbonate), the mixture's chief compound ingredient, along with other chemicals. Soda ash also replaced natron in the ancient glass trade. Some of its ancient household roles are also now filled by ordinary baking soda, which is sodium bicarbonate, natron's other key ingredient.

== Chemistry of hydrated sodium carbonate ==
Natron is also the mineralogical name for the compound sodium carbonate decahydrate (Na_{2}CO_{3}·10H_{2}O), which is the main component in historical natron. Sodium carbonate decahydrate has a specific gravity of 1.42 to 1.47 and a Mohs hardness of 1. It crystallizes in the monoclinic-domatic crystal system, typically forming efflorescences and encrustations.

The term hydrated sodium carbonate is commonly used to encompass the monohydrate (Na_{2}CO_{3}·H_{2}O), the decahydrate and the heptahydrate (Na_{2}CO_{3}·7H_{2}O), but is often used in industry to refer to the decahydrate only. Both the hepta- and the decahydrate effloresce (lose water) in dry air and are partially transformed into the monohydrate thermonatrite Na_{2}CO_{3}·H_{2}O.

=== As a source of soda ash ===
Sodium carbonate decahydrate is stable at room temperature but recrystallizes at only 32 °C (90 °F) to sodium carbonate heptahydrate, Na_{2}CO_{3}·7H_{2}O, then above 37–38 °C (99–100 °F) to sodium carbonate monohydrate, Na_{2}CO_{3}·H_{2}O. This recrystallization from decahydrate to monohydrate releases much crystal water in a mostly clear, colorless salt solution with little solid thermonatrite. The mineral natron is often found in association with thermonatrite, nahcolite, trona, halite, mirabilite, gaylussite, gypsum, and calcite. Most industrially produced sodium carbonate is soda ash (sodium carbonate anhydrate Na_{2}CO_{3}) which is obtained by calcination (dry heating at temperatures of 150 to 200 °C) of sodium bicarbonate, sodium carbonate monohydrate, or trona.

== Geological occurrence ==
Geologically, the mineral natron as well as the historical natron are formed as transpiro-evaporite minerals, i.e. crystallizing during the drying up of salt lakes rich in sodium carbonate. The sodium carbonate is usually formed by absorption of carbon dioxide from the atmosphere by a highly alkaline, sodium-rich lake brine, according to the following reaction scheme:

NaOH(aq) + CO_{2} → NaHCO_{3}(aq)
NaHCO_{3}(aq) + NaOH(aq) → Na_{2}CO_{3}(aq) + H_{2}O

Pure deposits of sodium carbonate decahydrate are rare, due to the limited temperature stability of this compound and due to the fact that the absorption of carbon dioxide usually produces mixtures of bicarbonate and carbonate in solution. From such mixtures, the mineral natron (and also the historical one) will be formed only if the brine temperature during evaporation is maximally about 20 °C (68 °F) – or the alkalinity of the lake is so high, that little bicarbonate is present in solution (see reaction scheme above) – in which case the maximum temperature is increased to about 30 °C (86 °F). In most cases the mineral natron will form together with some amount of nahcolite (sodium bicarbonate), resulting in salt mixtures like the historical natron. Otherwise, the minerals trona or thermonatrite and nahcolite are commonly formed. As the evaporation of a salt lake will occur over geological time spans, during which also part or all of the salt beds might redissolve and recrystallize, deposits of sodium carbonate can be composed of layers of all these minerals.

The following list may include geographical sources of either natron or other hydrated sodium carbonate minerals:

- Africa
  - Chad
    - shores of Lake Chad
    - Trou au Natron
    - Era Kohor crater on Emi Koussi
  - Egypt
    - Wadi El Natrun (Natron Valley)
  - Ethiopia
    - Showa Province
  - Niger
    - Bilma
  - Tanzania and Kenya
    - Lake Natron
- Europe
  - Hungary
    - Bács-Kiskun County, (Great Hungarian Plain)
    - Szabolcs-Szatmár-Bereg County (Great Hungarian Plain)
  - Italy
    - Campania
    - Province of Naples
    - Somma-Vesuvius Complex
  - Kola Peninsula, northern Russia
    - Khibiny Massif
    - Lovozero Massif
      - Alluaiv Mountain
      - Kedykverpakhk Mountain
    - Umbozero Mine
  - England, UK
    - St Just District
    - Botallack – Pendeen Area
- North America
  - Canada
    - Quebec
      - Rouville County
      - Mont-Saint-Hilaire
    - Interior British Columbia
  - United States
    - California
      - Inyo County
    - Nevada
      - Churchill County (Soda Lake District)
      - Humboldt County
      - Mineral County
    - Oregon
      - Lake County
    - Pennsylvania
      - Karns
      - Natrona
    - Washington
      - Okanogan County
    - Wyoming
      - Natrona County

== See also ==
- Shortite
- Soda (disambiguation)
- Sodium sesquicarbonate
