= Eti Soda =

Turkish chemical industry company

Eti Soda Inc.
- Native name: Eti Soda A.Ş.
- Type: Private company
- Industry: Chemicals
- Founded: 1998; 28 years ago
- Headquarters: Beypazarı, Ankara Province, Turkey
- Area served: Worldwide
- Products: Soda ash; Baking soda
- Owner: Ciner Holding (74%); Eti Maden (26%)

The Eti Soda Inc. is a chemical industry company in Ankara Province, Turkey, producing natural soda ash and baking soda from trona. It was founded in 1998, and the production started in 2009. The company's main shareholder is Ciner Group.

== Background ==
Trona ore deposits were discovered at Beypazarı, around 80 km (50 mi) northwest of Ankara, during drilling operations for coal exploration in 1979. Exploration works for trona ore reserve continued until 1985. According to world's leading consulting firms, mining of the trona ore at Bypazarı was not feasible with known methods. The state-owned mining company Eti Maden and the privately held Ciner Holding jointly took a risk and developed solution mining method for extraction of trona ore. The method, which was new in the world, has been then patented. In 1998, the Eti Soda Inc. was established in Ankara. The building of the soda production and cogeneration plants were completed between 2007 and 2009.

The production of soda ash started with an official inauguration ceremony, which took place in presence of Prime minister Recep Tayyip Erdoğan and Minister of Energy and Natural Resources Hilmi Güler in March 2009.

The Eti Soda Inc. is jointly owned in majority by Ciner Holding with 74% and by Eti Maden with 26%.

== Plant and production ==
Trona ore is extracted by solution mining method. Hot water is injected into the trona ore deposit underground through bore holes drilled, which dissolves trona ore. The trona solution is pumped up and is processed to soda products as soda ash (sodium carbonate, Na_{2}CO_{3}) and baking soda (sodium bicarbonate, NaHCO_{3}). The soda ash is mainly used in the glass production. Products of Eti Soda are exported all over the world, especially to European countries. From 2009 to 2013, the value of soda ash exports to 53 countries reached US$1 billion.

The annual production capacity of the Eti Soda facilities is one million tons of soda ash and 100,000 tons of baking soda. In 2010, already in its first year of the operation, the company fulfilled its production capacity. For comparison the 2022 production for the whole country was estimate at 4 to 5 million tonnes.

== Environmental impact ==
There is a 20 MW cogeneration coal-fired power station. Climate Trace estimated a 3570 million tonne source of greenhouse gas from soda ash in Turkey in 2022, but had low confidence in its estimate and had not been able to identify the company. ETI Soda aims to reduce its total scope 1 and 2 greenhouse gas emissions by almost 30% from 2021 to 480 million tonnes a year by 2028.

== See also ==
- Ciner Wyoming, United States
- Kazan Soda Elektrik, Turkey
