= Joseph Louis Gay-Lussac =

French chemist and physicist (1778–1850)

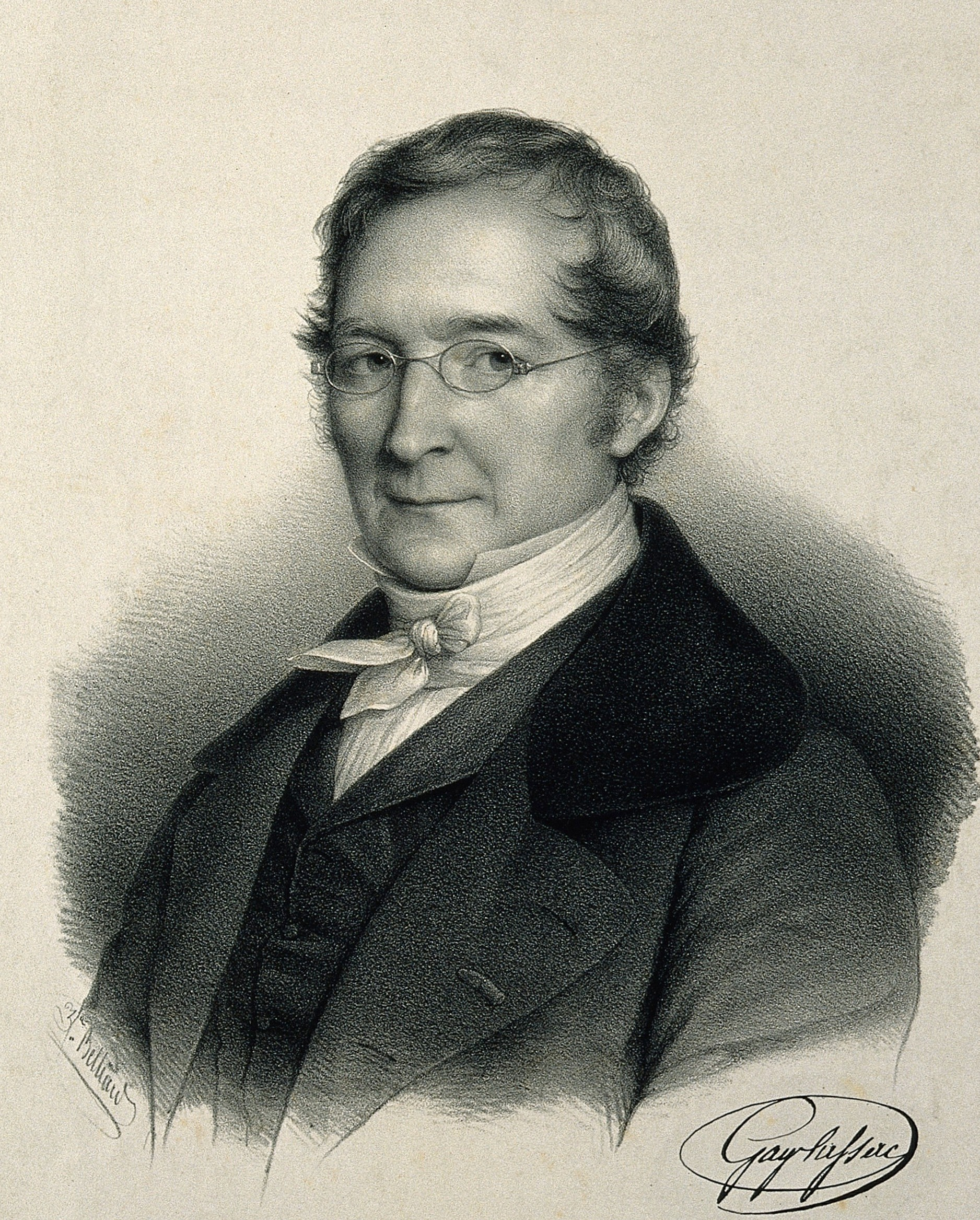
- Born: Joseph Louis Gay; 6 December 1778; Saint-Léonard-de-Noblat, France
- Died: 9 May 1850 (aged 71); Paris, France
- Education: École polytechnique
- Known for: Gay-Lussac's law; Degrees Gay-Lussac; Co-discovery of boron; Combustion analysis; Cyanogen
- Awards: Galvanism Prize (1809); Pour le Mérite (1842)
- Scientific career
- Fields: Chemistry

Joseph Louis Gay-Lussac (Note: UK: /ɡeɪˈluːsæk/ gay-LOO-sak, US: /ˌɡeɪləˈsæk/ GAY-lə-SAK; French pronunciation: [ʒozɛf lwi ɡɛlysak].) (6 December 1778 – 9 May 1850) was a French chemist and physicist. He is known mostly for his discovery that water is made of two parts hydrogen and one part oxygen by volume (with Alexander von Humboldt), for two laws related to gases, and for his work on alcohol–water mixtures, which led to the degrees Gay-Lussac used to measure alcoholic beverages in many countries.

== Biography ==
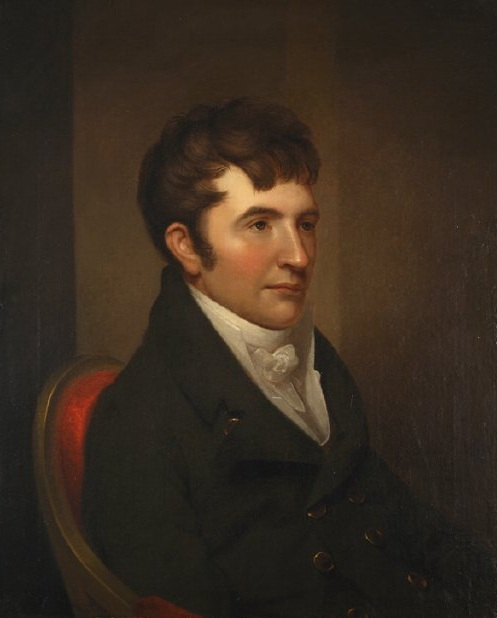
Portrait of Gay-Lussac by Rembrandt Peale (1810)

Gay-Lussac was born at Saint-Léonard-de-Noblat in the present-day department of Haute-Vienne.

His father, Anthony Gay, son of a doctor, was a lawyer and prosecutor and worked as a judge in Noblat Bridge. Father of two sons and three daughters, he owned much of the Lussac village and began to add the name of this hamlet to his name, following a custom of the Ancien Régime. Towards the year 1803, father and son formally adopted the name Gay-Lussac. During the Revolution, under the Law of Suspects, his father, former king's attorney, was imprisoned in Saint Léonard from 1793 to 1794.

Gay-Lussac received his early education at the hands of the Catholic Abbey of Bourdeix. In the care of the Abbot of Dumonteil, he began his education in Paris, finally entering the École Polytechnique in 1798.

Three years later, Gay-Lussac transferred to the École des Ponts et Chaussées, and shortly afterward was assigned to C. L. Berthollet as his assistant. In 1804 he was appointed répétiteur (demonstrator) to Antoine François Fourcroy at the École Polytechnique, whom he succeeded in 1809 as professor of chemistry. From 1809 to 1832, he was also the professor of physics at the Sorbonne, a post which he only resigned for the chair of chemistry at the Jardin des Plantes. In 1821, he was elected a foreign member of the Royal Swedish Academy of Sciences. In 1831 he was elected to represent Haute-Vienne in the chamber of deputies, and in 1839 he entered the chamber of peers. He was elected a Foreign Honorary Member of the American Academy of Arts and Sciences in 1832.

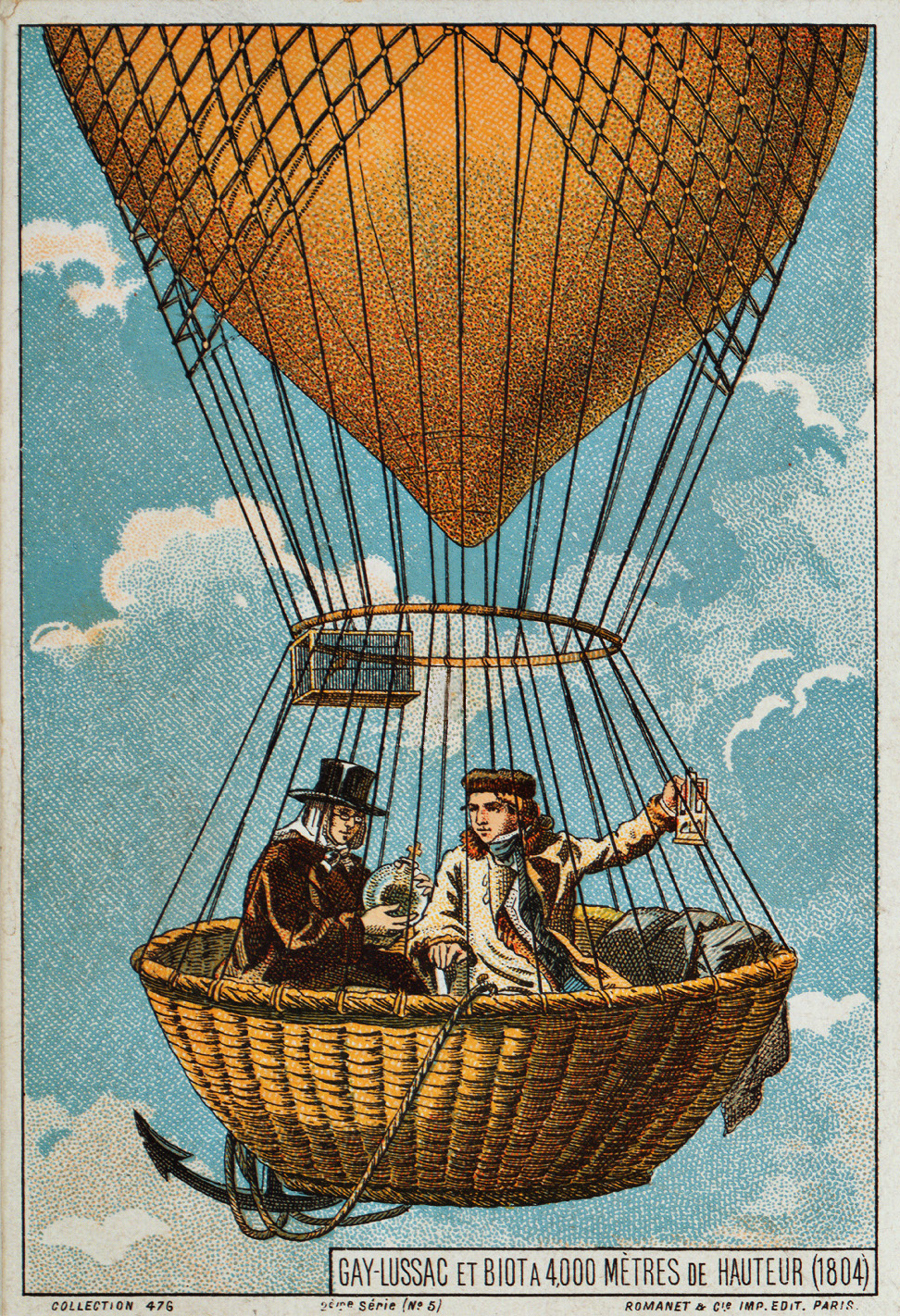
Gay-Lussac and Biot ascend in a hydrogen balloon, 1804. Illustration from the late 19th century.

Gay-Lussac married Geneviève-Marie-Joseph Rojot in 1809. He had first met her when she worked as a linen draper's shop assistant; he noticed she was studying a chemistry textbook under the counter, which led to their acquaintance. The couple had five children, of whom the eldest (Jules) became a student of Justus Liebig in Giessen. Some publications by Jules are mistaken as his father's today since they share the same first initial (J. Gay-Lussac).

Gay-Lussac had a reputation as one of the greatest European scientists of his day, well justified by his innumerable discoveries in both chemistry and physics. The restored royalty made him a Peer of France, although he worked politically with the anti-clerical party. He was closely associated with François Arago.

Gay-Lussac died in Paris, and his grave is there at Père Lachaise Cemetery. His name is one of the 72 names inscribed on the Eiffel Tower.

== Achievements ==
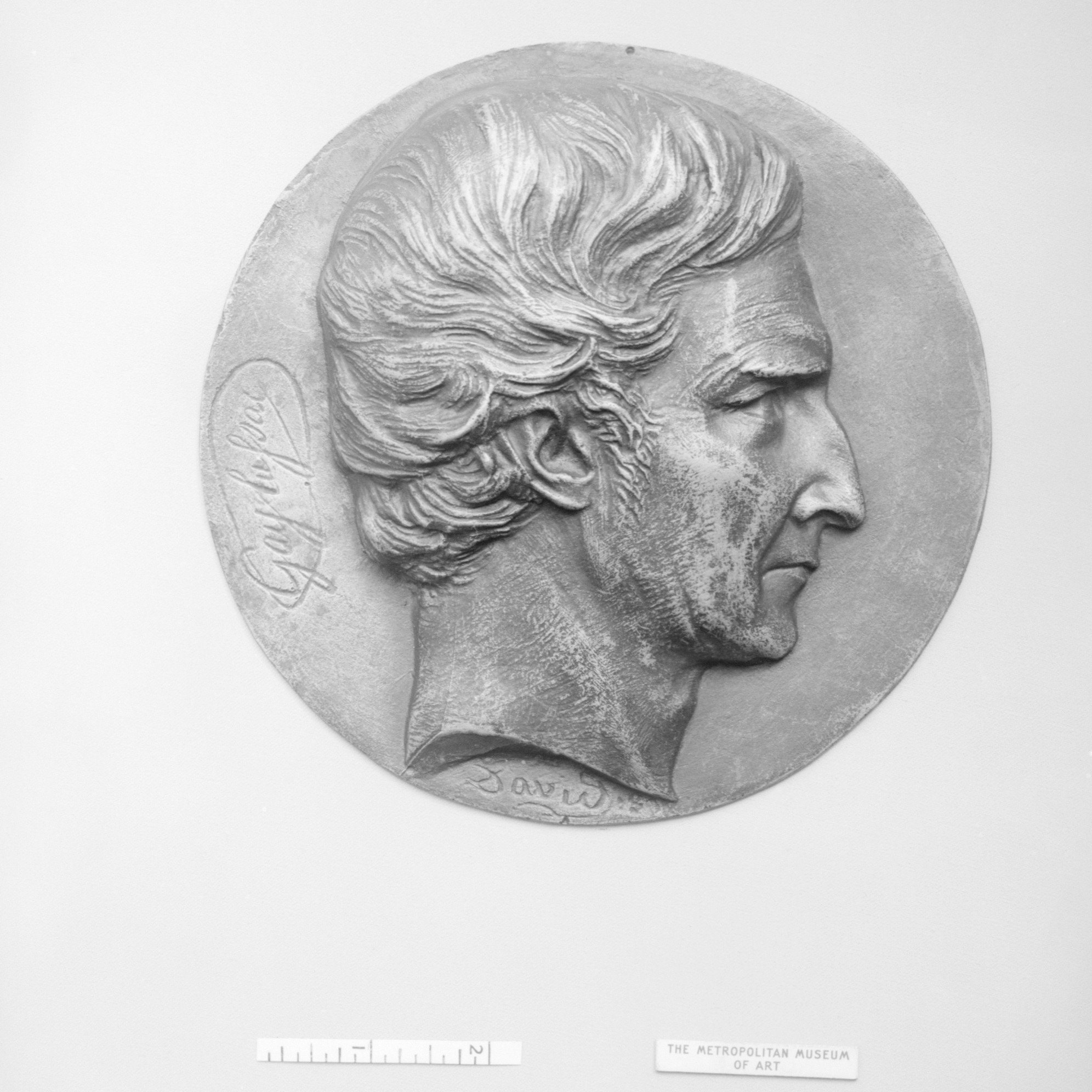
Gay-Lussac by David d'Angers, 1830s

- 1802 – Gay-Lussac first published the law that at constant pressure, the volume of any gas increases in proportion to its absolute temperature. Since in his paper announcing the law he cited earlier unpublished work on this subject by Jacques Charles, the law is usually called Charles's law, though some sources use the expression Gay-Lussac's law. This law was independently and nearly simultaneously stated by John Dalton.
- 1804 – He and Jean-Baptiste Biot made a hydrogen-balloon ascent; a second ascent the same year by Gay-Lussac alone attained a height of 7,016 metres (23,018 ft) in an early investigation of the Earth's atmosphere. He wanted to collect air samples at different heights to record differences in temperature and moisture.
- 1805 – Together with his friend and scientific collaborator Alexander von Humboldt, he discovered that the composition of the atmosphere does not change with decreasing pressure (increasing altitude). They also discovered that water is formed by two parts of hydrogen and one part of oxygen (by volume).
- 1808 – He was the co-discoverer of boron.
- 1808 – Discovery and announcement of the law of combining volumes of gases; published in 1809.
- 1810 – In collaboration with Louis Jacques Thénard, he developed a method for quantitative elemental organic combustion analysis by measuring the CO_{2} and H_{2}O evolved when an organic compound is fully oxidized by potassium chlorate. He also summarised the equation of alcoholic fermentation.
- 1811 – He recognized iodine as a new element, described its properties, and suggested the name iode.
- 1815 – He synthesized cyanogen, determined its empirical formula, and named it.
- 1824 – He developed an improved version of the burette that included a side arm, and coined the terms "pipette" and "burette" in an 1824 paper about the standardization of indigo solutions.

== Awards and honours ==
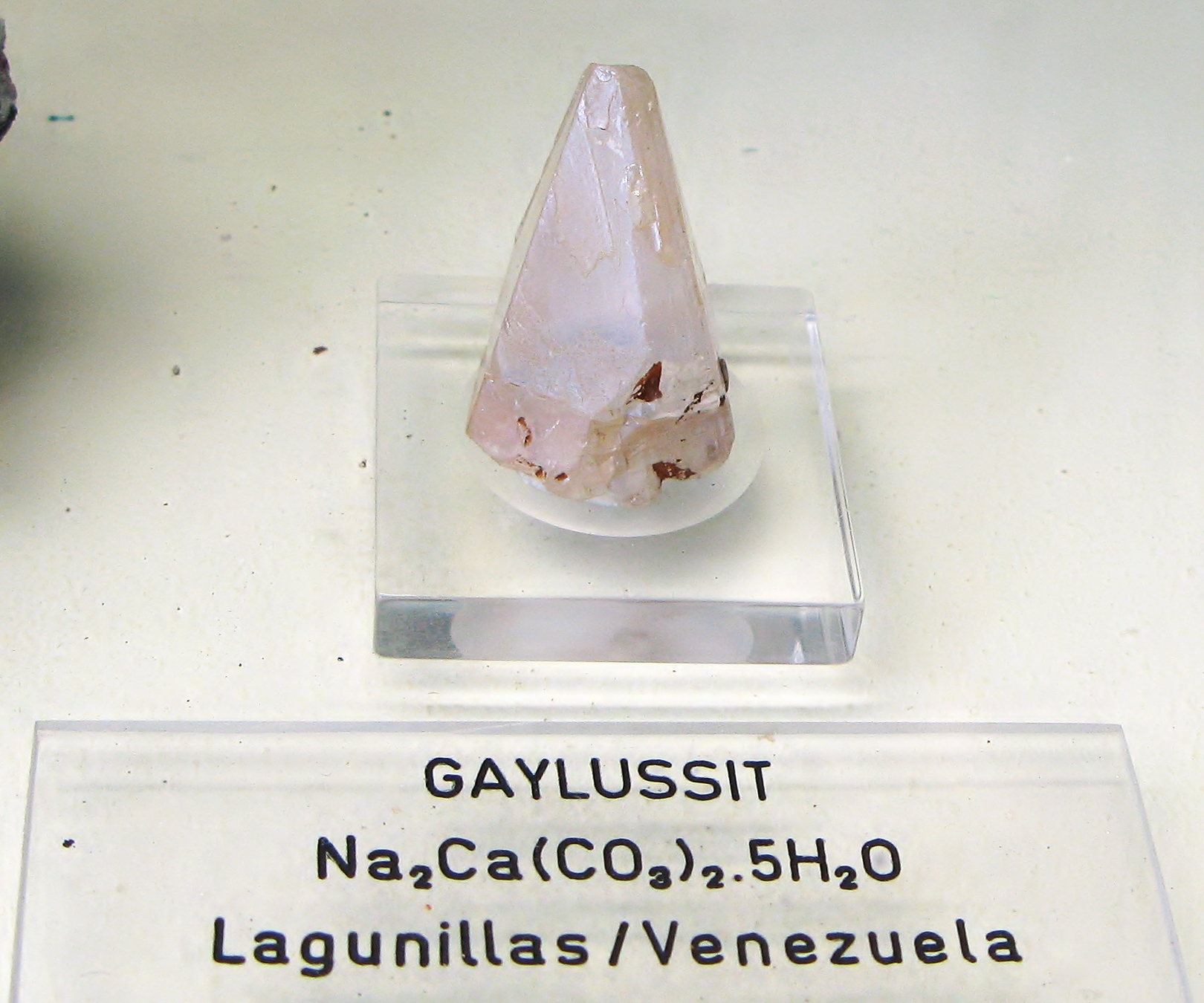
Mineral Gaylussite of Lagunillas, at Bonn Museum

- Along with Thénard, Gay Lussac received 30,000 francs from Napoleon in the third edition of the Galvanism Prize in 1809 for their research.
- In Paris, a street and a hotel near the Sorbonne are named after him as are a square and a street in his birthplace, Saint-Léonard-de-Noblat.
- In Australia, the "Gay-Lussac Room" at AB Mauri STC, Sydney, was named after him in honour of his work with yeast fermentation.
- Gaylussite is a mineral salt formed as an evaporite from alkali lacustrine waters. Jean-Baptiste Boussingault (1801 – 1887) was the first to describe it in 1826 for an occurrence in Lagunillas, Mérida, Venezuela. The mineral was named in honour of Gay Lussac.

== Academic lineage ==
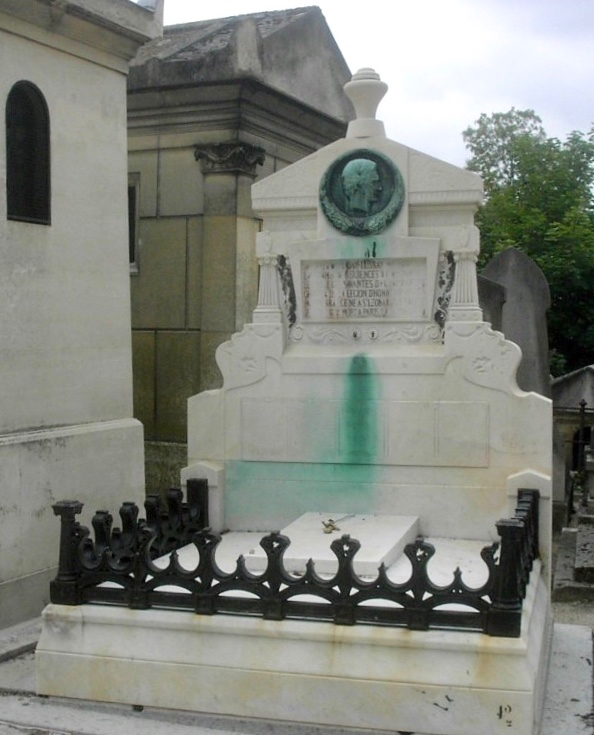
Grave of Gay-Lussac

Academic genealogy
| Notable teachers | Notable students |
|---|---|
| C. L. Berthollet (1748–1822), Paris; Antoine François, comte de Fourcroy (1755–1809), Paris | Jean-Jacques Colin (1784–1865), répétiteur in 1809–1817; Pierre Robiquet (1780–1840), répétiteur in 1813–1818; César Despretz (1791–1863), répétiteur in 1817–?; Jules Pelouze (1807–1867), répétiteur in 1831–1837?; Edmond Frémy (1814–1894); Henri-Victor Regnault (1810–1878); Justus Liebig (1803–1873) |

== Publications ==
- Chemistry courses of the École Polytechnique, Vol.1&2
- Lessons of Physics, Faculty of Sciences in Paris, (November 6, 1827, March 18, 1828)

== See also ==
- Brin process
- Joule expansion
- Lead chamber process
