= Trona =

Hydrated sodium carbonate mineral

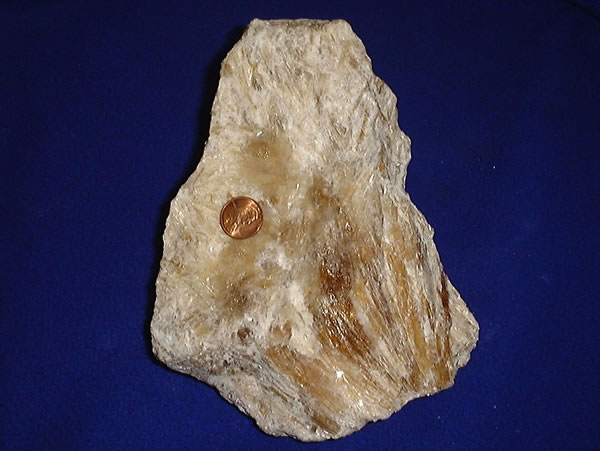

General
- Category: Carbonate mineral
- Formula: Na_{2}CO_{3}·NaHCO_{3}·2H_{2}O
- IMA symbol: Tn
- Strunz classification: 5.CB.15
- Crystal system: Monoclinic
- Crystal class: Prismatic (2/m) (same H-M symbol)
- Space group: C2/c (no. 15)

Identification
- Color: Colorless (in transmitted light) or white, grey-white, also grey to yellowish grey, light yellow
- Crystal habit: Columnar, fibrous and massive.
- Cleavage: [100] perfect, [111] and [001] indistinct
- Fracture: Brittle – subconchoidal
- Mohs scale hardness: 2.5
- Luster: Vitreous
- Streak: White
- Diaphaneity: Translucent
- Specific gravity: 2.11–2.17
- Optical properties: Biaxial (−)
- Refractive index: nα = 1.412 nβ = 1.492 nγ = 1.540
- Birefringence: δ = 0.128
- Solubility: Soluble in water
- Other characteristics: May fluoresce under short wavelength ultraviolet

Trona (trisodium hydrogendicarbonate dihydrate, also sodium sesquicarbonate dihydrate, Na_{2}CO_{3}·NaHCO_{3}·2H_{2}O) is a non-marine evaporite mineral. It is mined as the primary source of sodium carbonate in the United States, where it has replaced the Solvay process used in most of the rest of the world for sodium carbonate production. Turkey is also a major producer.

== Etymology ==
The word entered English by way of either Swedish (trona) or Spanish (trona), with both possible sources having the same meaning as in English: the mineral natron from North Africa. Both the Spanish and Swedish terms derive from the Arabic trōn, which comes from ancient Greek νιτρον (nitron), derived ultimately from Ancient Egyptian ntry (or nitry).

== Natural deposits ==
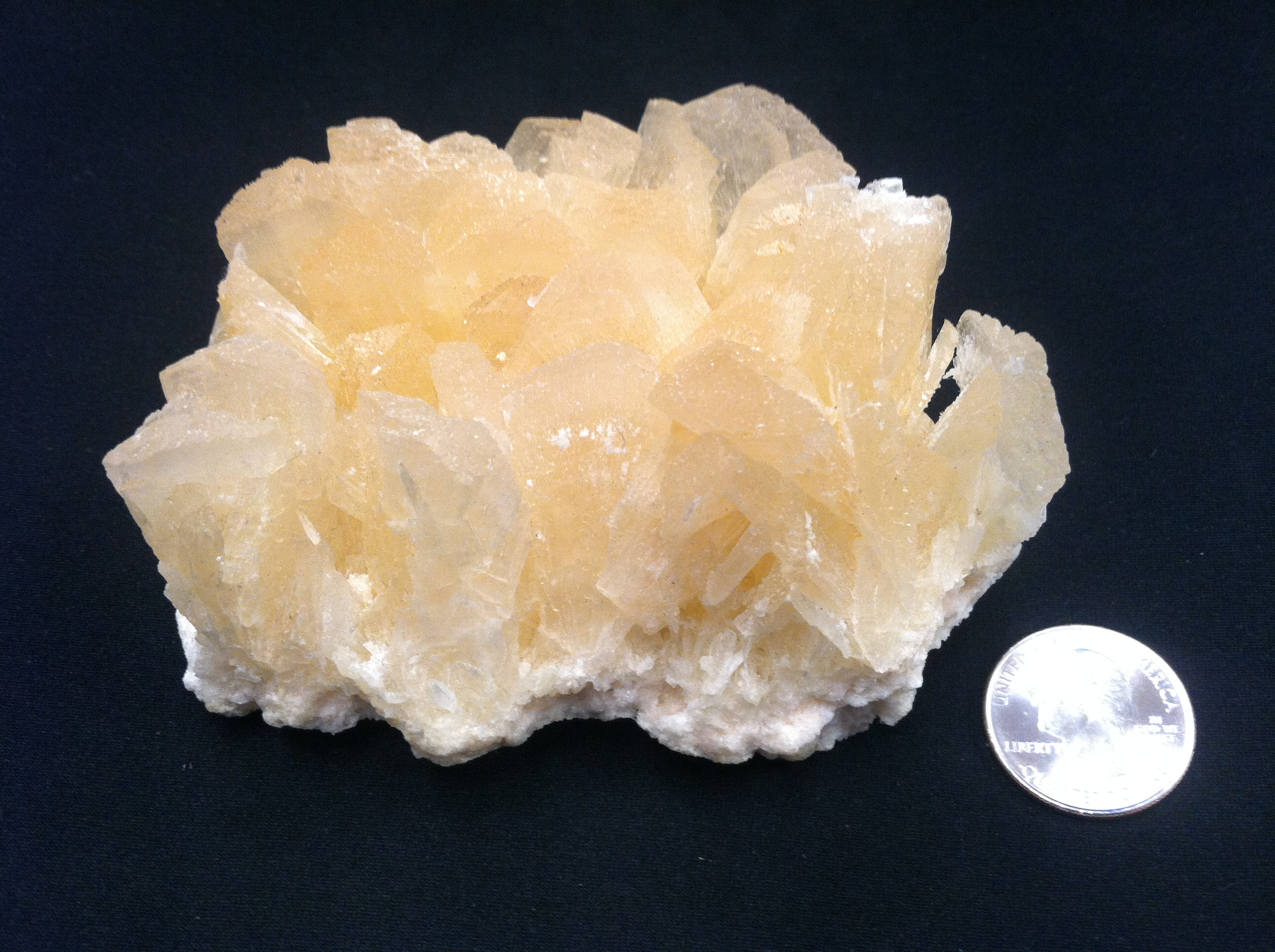
Trona sample from Searles Valley, California near the town of Trona, California

Trona is found at Owens Lake and Searles Lake, California; the Green River Formation of Wyoming and Utah; the Makgadikgadi Pans in Botswana and in the Nile Valley in Egypt. It also occurs at the Laguna de Urao near Lagunillas in Mérida, Venezuela, where the salt known locally as urao was shown to be trona in 1824 by Mariano Eduardo de Rivero y Ustáriz and Jean-Baptiste Boussingault. The trona near Green River, Wyoming, is the largest known deposit in the world and lies in layered evaporite deposits below ground, where the trona was deposited in a lake during the Paleogene Period. Trona has also been mined at Lake Magadi in the Kenyan Rift Valley for nearly 100 years. The northern part of Lake Natron is covered by a 1.5 m thick trona bed, and occurs in 'salt' pans in the Etosha National Park in Namibia. The Beypazari region in the Ankara Province of Turkey has some 33 trona beds in two fault-bound lensoid bodies in and above oil shales of the Lower Hirka Formation (16 in the lower and 17 in the upper body). The Wucheng basin trona mine, Henan Province China has some 36 trona beds (693–974 m deep), the lower 15 beds are 0.5–1.5 m thick, thickest 2.38 m; the upper 21 beds are 1–3 m thick, with a maximum of 4.56 m hosted and underlain by dolomitic oil shales of the Wulidui Formation.

Trona has also been found in magmatic environments. Research has shown that trona can be formed by autometasomatic reactions of late-magmatic fluids or melts (or supercritical fluid-melt mixtures), with earlier crystallized rocks within the same plutonic complex, or by large-scale vapor unmixing in the very final stages of magmatism.

== Crystal structure ==
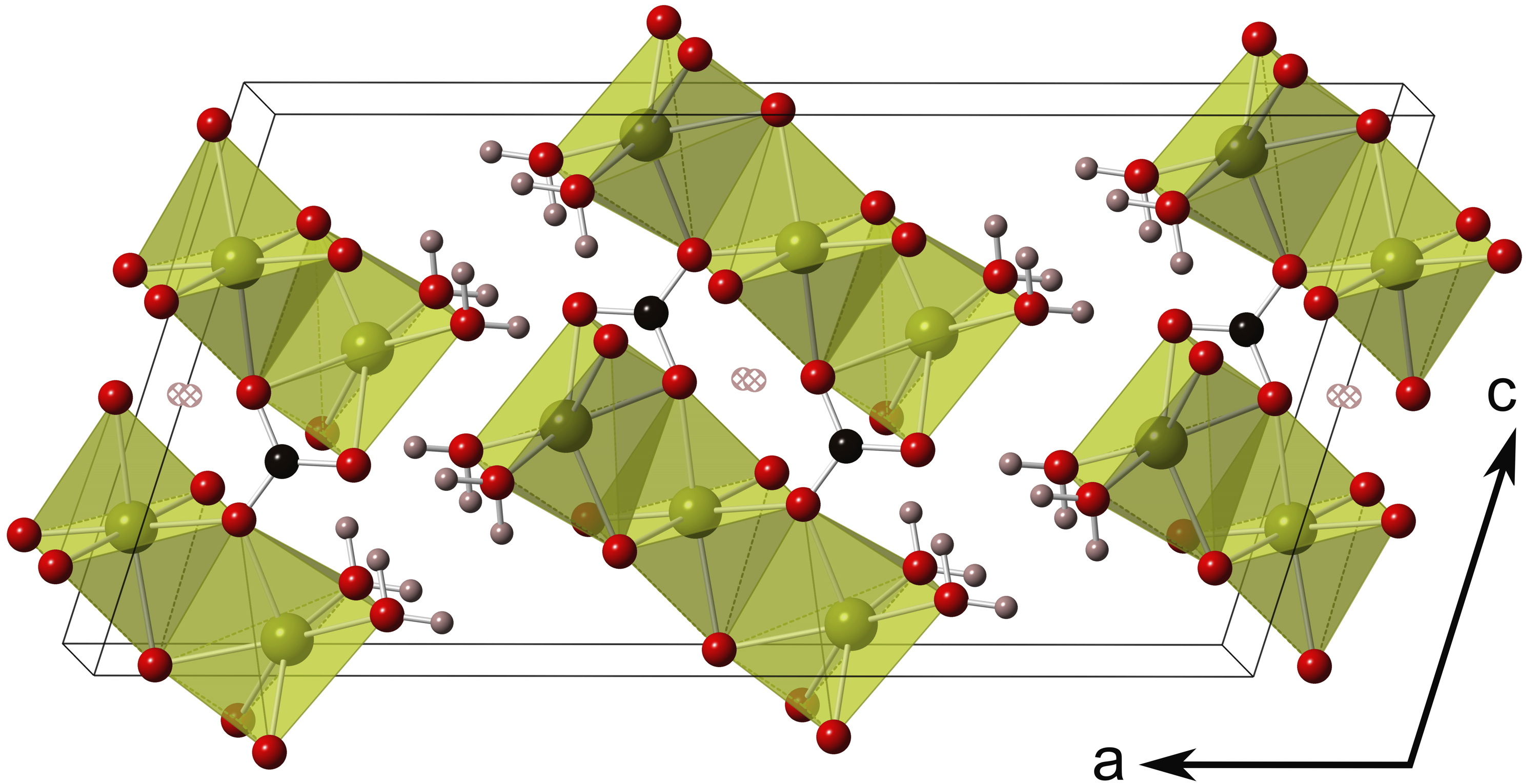
The ambient temperature crystal structure of trona viewed down the b axis with the unit cell indicated by the solid gray line.

The crystal structure of trona was first determined by Brown et al. (1949). The structure consists of units of 3 edge-sharing sodium polyhedra (a central octahedron flanked by septahedra), cross-linked by carbonate groups and hydrogen bonds. Bacon and Curry (1956) refined the structure determination using two-dimensional single-crystal neutron diffraction, and suggested that the hydrogen atom in the symmetric (HC_{2}O_{6})^{3−} anion is disordered. The environment of the disordered H atom was later investigated by Choi and Mighell (1982) at 300 K with three-dimensional single-crystal neutron diffraction: they concluded that the H atom is dynamically disordered between two equivalent sites, separated from one another by 0.211(9) Å. The dynamically disordered H atom was reinvestigated at low temperature by O'Bannon et al. 2014 and they concluded that it does not order at temperatures as low as 100 K.

== Uses ==
- Trona is a common source of soda ash, which is a significant economic commodity because of its applications in manufacturing glass, chemicals, paper, detergents, and textiles.
- It is used to condition water.
- It is used to remove sulfur from both flue gases and lignite coals.
- It is a product of carbon sequestration of flue gases.
- It is also used as a food additive.

== Mining operations ==
- Rio Tinto – Owens Lake
- Magadi Soda Company
- Searles Valley Minerals Inc.
- Solvay
- Tata Chemicals
- Genesis Alkali formerly Tronox Alkali formerly FMC Corporation
- General Chemical
- Ciner Wyoming formerly OCI Chemical Corp.
- ANSAC
- Eti Soda, Turkey
- Kazan Soda Elektrik, Turkey
- Church & Dwight – Green River Mine
- Intrepid Potash
- Simplot
- Sisecam

== See also ==
- Natron
- Nahcolite
- Shortite
- Sodium sesquicarbonate
- Thermonatrite
