= Thermonatrite =

Naturally occurring mineral

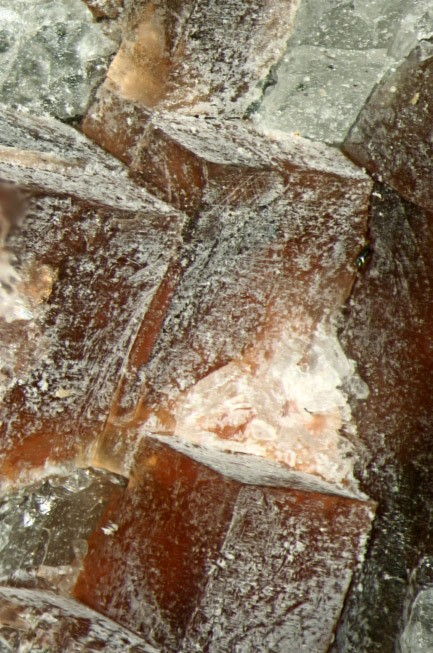
- Villiaumite and thermonatrite (powdery coating)

General
- Category: Carbonate mineral
- Formula: Na_{2}CO_{3}·H_{2}O
- IMA symbol: Tnat
- Strunz classification: 5.CB.05
- Crystal system: Orthorhombic
- Crystal class: Pyramidal (mm2); H-M symbol: (mm2)
- Space group: Pca2_{1}
- Unit cell: a = 10.72 Å, b = 5.24 Å c = 6.46 Å; Z = 4

Identification
- Colour: Colourless to grey or yellow, white
- Crystal habit: Acicular crystals rare; typically occurs as powdery crusts
- Cleavage: Poor to indistinct on {100}
- Fracture: Sectile
- Mohs scale hardness: 1 – 1 1/2
- Lustre: Vitreous
- Diaphaneity: Transparent
- Specific gravity: 2.255 (measured on synthetic crystal)
- Optical properties: Biaxial (−)
- Refractive index: n_{α} = 1.420 n_{β} = 1.506 n_{γ} = 1.524
- Birefringence: δ = 0.104
- 2V angle: 48° (measured)
- Solubility: Soluble in water
- Other characteristics: Readily dehydrates

Thermonatrite is a naturally occurring evaporite mineral form of sodium carbonate, Na_{2}CO_{3}·H_{2}O.

It was first described in 1845. Its name is from the Greek θερμός thermos, "heat", plus natron, because it may be a dehydration product of natron.

Typical occurrence is in dry saline lake beds and as soil encrustations. It has been reported from volcanic fumaroles and in association with carbonatite-related veins. Common associated minerals include trona, natron and halite.

== See also ==
- Nahcolite
- Natron
- Niter
- Potassium nitrate
- Shortite
- Soda (disambiguation)
- Sodium sesquicarbonate
- Trona
