= Lagunillas, Mérida =

Lagunillas
- City
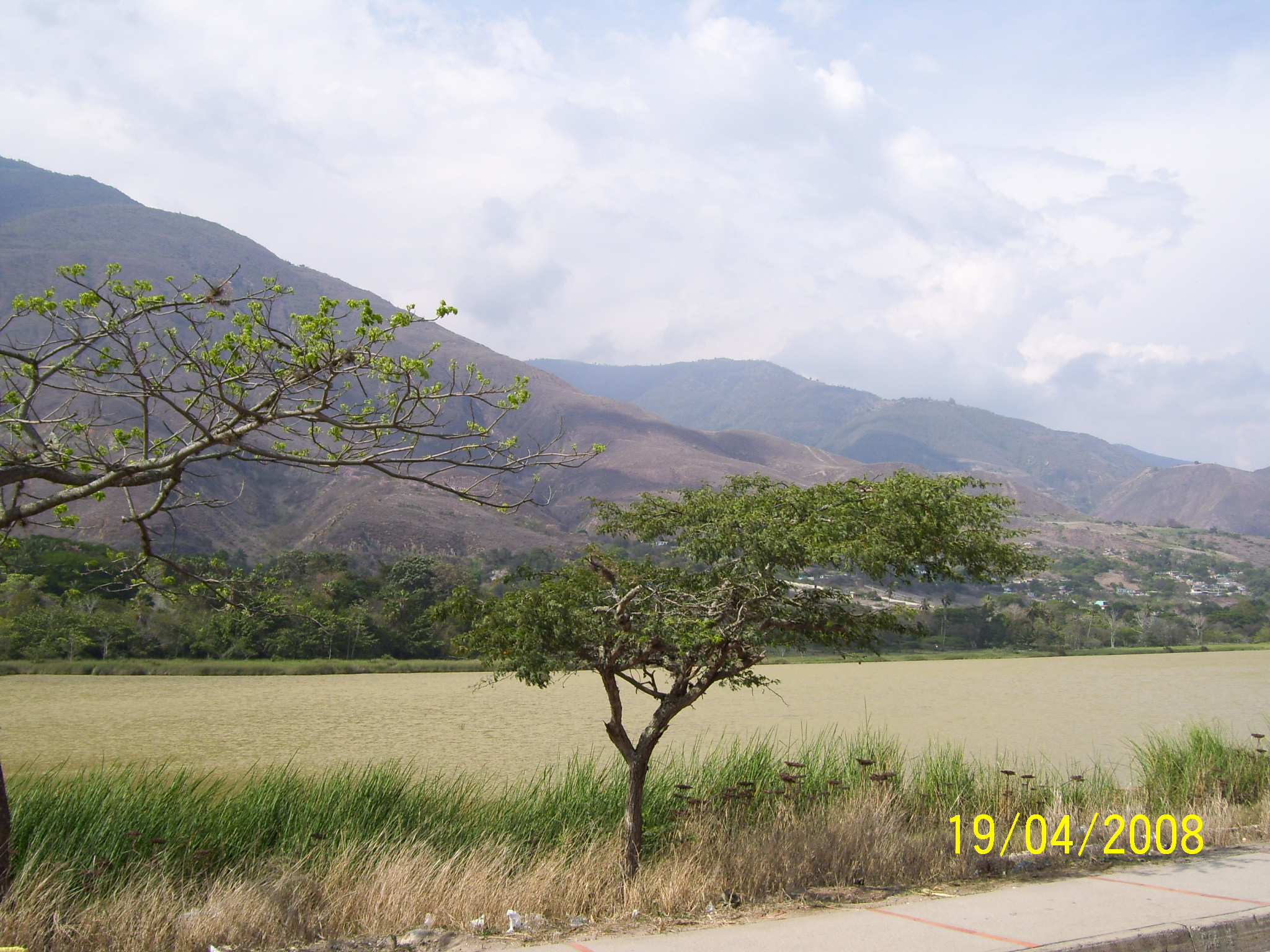
- Urao lagoon

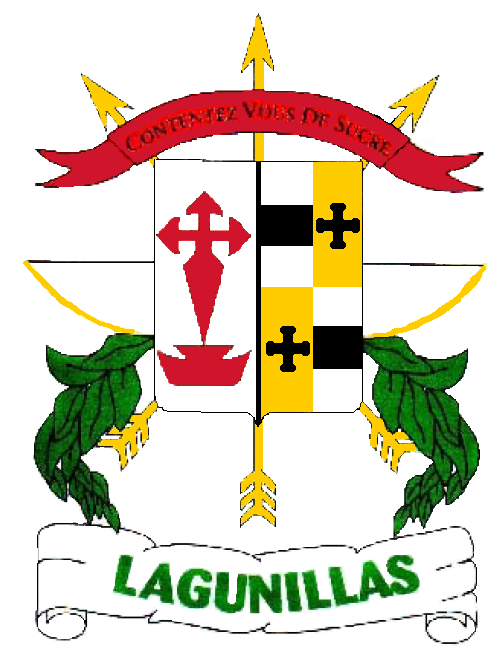
- Coat of arms

- Location within Venezuela
- Coordinates: 8.5014°N 71.3921°W
- Country: Venezuela
- State: Mérida
- Municipality: Sucre
- Elevation: 1,070 m (3,510 ft)

Population (2011)
  - Total: 42,717
- Time zone: UTC -4:30
- Postal code: 5111
- Area code: 0274
- Climate: Aw

Lagunillas is the capital city of the municipality of Sucre in the state of Mérida, Venezuela. It is 30 kilometres (19 mi) from the city of Mérida. The old town is of interest to tourists. The town is known for the large number of artifacts created with local materials.

== Lagoon ==
The city is in a semi-arid zone in the middle basin of the Chama River, with a warm, dry climate. It contains the Laguna de Urao, a natural lagoon that helps cool the air, and adds humidity, named after an indigenous word for sodium sesquicarbonate, which is found in the lake. This material was traditionally used to make chimó llanero. This lagoon is full of brackish water. The French chemist Jean-Baptiste Boussingault (1801–1887) discovered the mineral Gaylussite in the lagoon in 1826. It is named for the French chemist Joseph Louis Gay-Lussac (1778-1850). The lagoon was declared a natural monument on 18 June 1979. However, areas surrounding the lagoon were left open to development, leading to a continuing deterioration in the lagoon's quality, as well as to a slow decrease in its size. An NGO was created in 2016 to protect the lagoon. In February 2017 residents of the Sucre municipality denounced the deterioration of drying up of the Urao Lagoon, the main tourist attraction in the area, which they attribute to indiscriminate construction of housing and to climate change. They blamed the local authorities for issuing construction permits and the environmental authority for failing to implement protective measures.

== Miscellaneous ==
An oil camp for Shell Venezuela workers in Lagunillas was designed by the architect José Lino Vaamonde in 1954. This was a self-contained community where the workers were isolated from the "wild" exterior. Vaamonde also designed the Lagunillas Craft Training Center (1953).

On 7 November 2015 a magnitude 5.3 earthquake occurred 4 kilometres (2.5 mi) SSE of Lagunillas at a depth of 13.5 kilometres (8.4 mi). Another 5.3 magnitude earthquake occurred on 22 November 2015 2 kilometres (1.2 mi) NNW of Lagunillas at a depth of 28.1 kilometres (17.5 mi).

== Sources ==
- d'Omalius d'Halloy, Jean-Baptiste Julien (1838), Introduction a la geologie: 1: Des elements d'histoire naturelle inorganique contenant des notions d'astronomie, de meteorologie et de mineralogie (in French), Societe belge de librairie
- "Gaylussite", Mindat
- González Casas, Lorenzo; Vicente Garrido, Henry (2010), Mundos que se desvanecen: el exilio arquitectónico español en Venezuela. (in Spanish), Universidade de Santiago de Compostela, Centro Interdisciplinario de Estudios Americanistas
- "M5.3 – 2km NNW of Lagunillas, Venezuela", Earthquake Hazards Program, U.S. Geological Survey, archived from the original on 2015-11-24
- "M5.3 – 4km SSE of Lagunillas, Venezuela", Earthquake Hazards Program, U.S. Geological Survey, archived from the original on 2015-11-09
- Rivas, Elvis (17 February 2017), Denuncian deteriororo del monumento natural Laguna de Urao en Lagunillas de Mérida (in Spanish)
