= Turgay Ciner =

Turkish industrialist (born 1956)

- Born: 1956 (age 68–69); Hopa, Turkey
- Occupation: Businessman
- Title: Owner, Ciner Group
- Spouse: Didem Özkan
- Children: 2

Turgay Ciner (born 1956) is a Turkish businessman and owner of the Ciner Group, a conglomerate that operates in four main sectors: energy and mining, natural soda ash, container glass, and shipping.

== Early life ==
Ciner was born in Hopa, Artvin Province, in 1956.

== Career ==
In the 1980s, Ciner began his first business venture, with his brother, importing German cars to Turkey. At the start of the 1990s, he diversified into the textile industry and proceeded to perform turnkey installations of textile plants outside of Uzbekistan, before buying two more textile plants in Turkey. In 1997, he acquired Penyeluks, a large ready-to-wear textiles company and renamed it Park Tekstil and Mensucat Santral. Subsequently, he floated 33% of Park Tekstil shares on the Istanbul Stock Exchange. In 1995, Ciner bought 60% of Havaş, Turkey's main airport ground handling and services company. In 1998, Havaş partnered with Swissair, which acquired a 40% stake in the company.

== Ciner Group ==
Ciner Group operates in the following industry sectors:

=== Soda ash & sodium bicarbonate ===
We Soda Ltd, a UK-based holding company, is the biggest natural soda ash producer in the world. It currently runs two plants in Turkey and two in the United States, one of which was acquired from Genesis Alkali in 2025.

=== Container glass ===
Ciner Glass started in 2011 with the introduction of the Park Cam glass plant. In 2018, the company expanded its operations with the introduction of the Ciner Glass UK headquarters in London.

=== Energy & mining ===
Ciner Group manages a portfolio of natural gas-fired power plants in Turkey.

=== Shipping ===
Ciner Shipping is the largest shipowner in Turkey.

=== Media ===
Ciner Group previously owned and operated two TV channels, Habertürk TV and Show TV, as well as broadcasting rights for Bloomberg in Turkey. These assets were sold to Can Group in 2025, a deal announced in December 2024.

== Sporting interests ==
Ciner is the owner of Kasımpaşa S.K., the Turkish Premier League football club. His parent company, Ciner Glass, is also the main sponsor of the Ebbw Vale Rugby Club. In March 2022, WE Soda sponsored the Welsh Rugby Union programmes Fit and Fed and Jersey for All to help support young players.
