= Jean-Baptiste Boussingault =

French chemist (1801–1887)

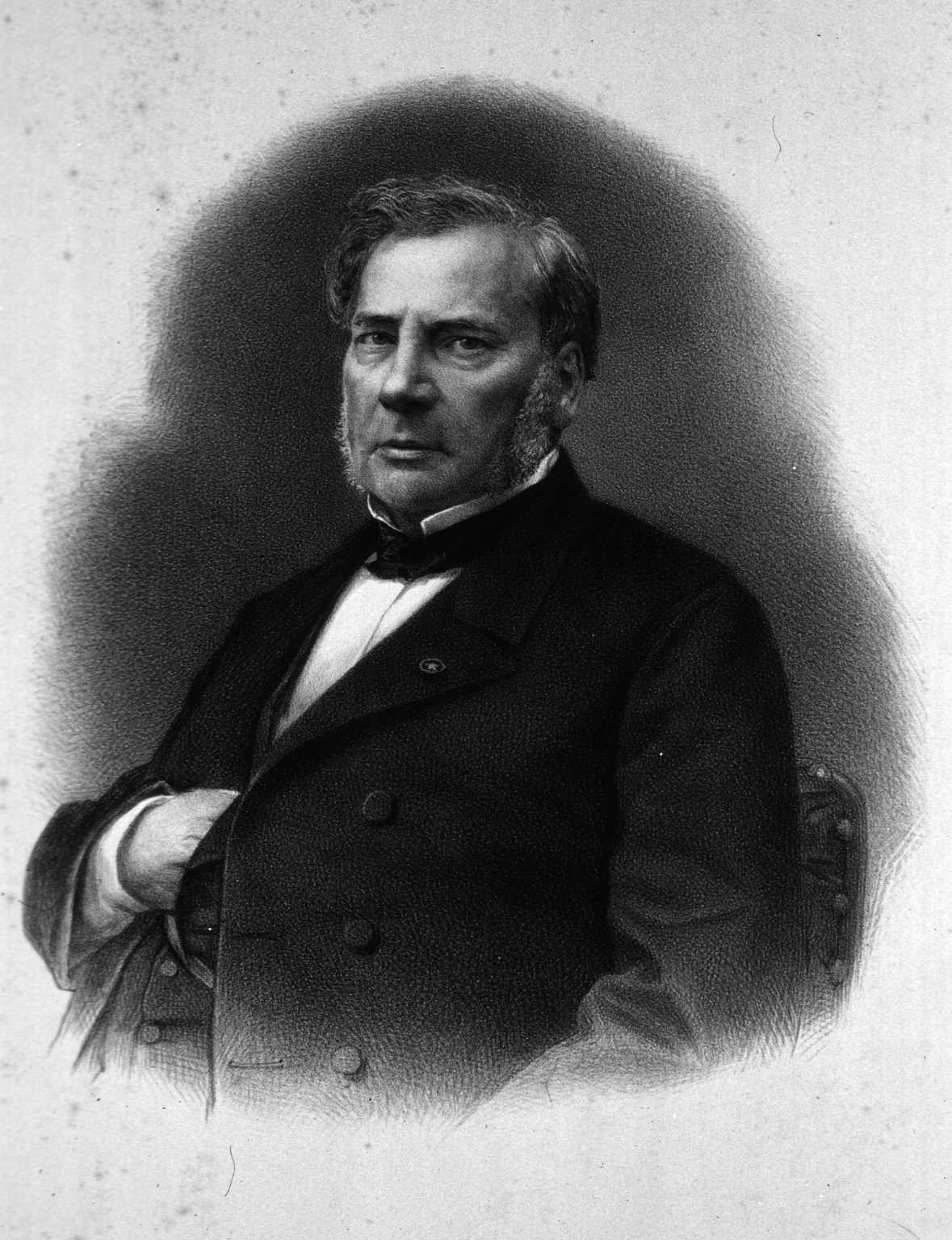
- Born: Jean-Baptiste Joseph Dieudonné Boussingault; 2 February 1801; Paris, France
- Died: 11 May 1887 (aged 86); Paris, France
- Awards: Copley Medal (1878)
- Scientific career
- Fields: Chemistry
- Workplaces: Conservatoire des Arts et Metiers
- Thesis: Recherches sur les phénomènes chimiques qui se passent dans l'amalgamation américaine (1834)

Jean-Baptiste Joseph Dieudonné Boussingault (2 February 1801 – 11 May 1887) was a French chemist who made significant contributions to agricultural science, petroleum science and metallurgy.

== Biography ==
Jean-Baptiste Boussingault – an agricultural scientist and chemist – was born in Paris. After studying at the school of mines at Saint-Etienne he went to Alsace to work in the asphalt mines – a two-year interlude that was to shape his contributions to science.

During the insurrection of the Spanish colonies, the president of Gran-Colombia, the liberator Simón Bolívar, named Francisco Antonio Zea, ambassador in France, to contract youngers and singles European scientists to investigate the available sources of his new formed nation. In 1822 Boussingault with the Peruvian geologist Mariano Rivero were contracted by Zea and they went to Venezuela as a mining engineer on behalf of an English company contracted by Bolivar. In Urao lagoon near Lagunillas, Merida State, Venezuela discovered the mineral Gaylussite. During his stay in America, he observed that goiter was endemic in some areas and not in others, and that this was related to the presence of iodine in the salt of some salt flats. Consequently, on his return to Europe, he proposed the use of this iodized salt to combat goiter, although his proposal was not taken into account.

At Santa Fe de Bogota he was attached to the staff of General Bolivar as colonel and traveled widely in the northern parts of the continent. Between March and December 1831, he attempted to climb seven Andean volcanoes: Puracé, Galeras and Cumbal in Colombia, and Pichincha, Antisana, Cotopaxi and Chimborazo in Ecuador. In 1831 he climbed to a new highest altitude by a Western explorer on Chimborazo (6.006 m) in the process.

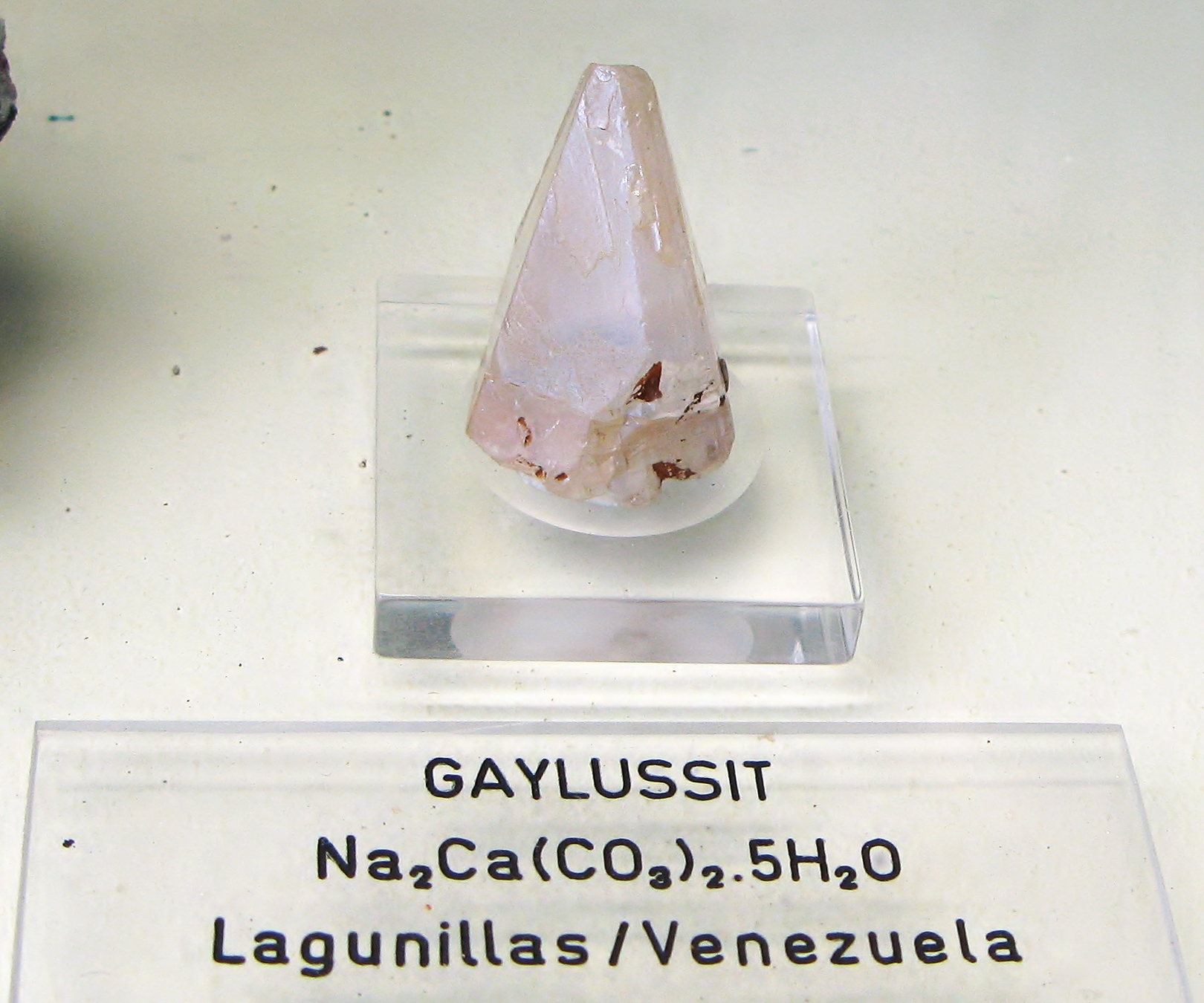
Gaylussite discovered in Lagunillas, Merida State, Venezuela

Returning to France in 1832 he married Adele Le Bel whose family had the concession to the asphalt mines where he had previously worked and it was in this period that he made his greatest discoveries. Later he became professor of chemistry at Lyon, and in 1839 was appointed to the chair of agricultural and analytical chemistry at the Conservatoire des Arts et Metiers in Paris. In 1848 he was elected to the National Assembly representing his adopted Alsace, where he sat as a Moderate republican. Three years later he was dismissed from his professorship on account of his political opinions, but so much resentment at this action was shown by scientific men in general, and especially by his colleagues, who threatened to resign in a body, that he was reinstated. He died in Paris.

His first papers were concerned with agricultural and mining topics, and his sojourn in South America yielded a number of miscellaneous memoirs, on the cause of goitre in the Cordilleras, the gases of volcanoes, earthquakes, tropical rain, &c., which won the commendation of Alexander von Humboldt. From 1836 he devoted himself mainly to agricultural chemistry and animal and vegetable physiology, with occasional excursions into mineral chemistry. His work included papers on the quantity of nitrogen in different foods, the amount of gluten in different wheats, investigations on the question whether plants can assimilate free nitrogen from the atmosphere (which he answered in the negative and propose the basis of what became known as the nitrogen cycle), the respiration of plants, the function of their leaves, the action and value of manures and chemical fertilizers, and other similar subjects. In 1839, he was elected a foreign member of the Royal Swedish Academy of Sciences.

Through his wife Adele Le Bel he had a share in an estate at Pechelbronn in Alsace, where he carried out many agricultural experiments on what is considered to be the first agricultural experimental station (as defined in terms of scientific experimentation on a field basis). He collaborated with Jean Baptiste Dumas in writing an Essai de statique chimique des litres organists (1841), and was the author of Traite d'economie rurale (1844), which was remodelled as Agronomie, chimie agricole, et physiologie (5 vols., 1860–1874; 2nd ed., 1884), and of Etudes sur la transformation du fer en acier (1875).

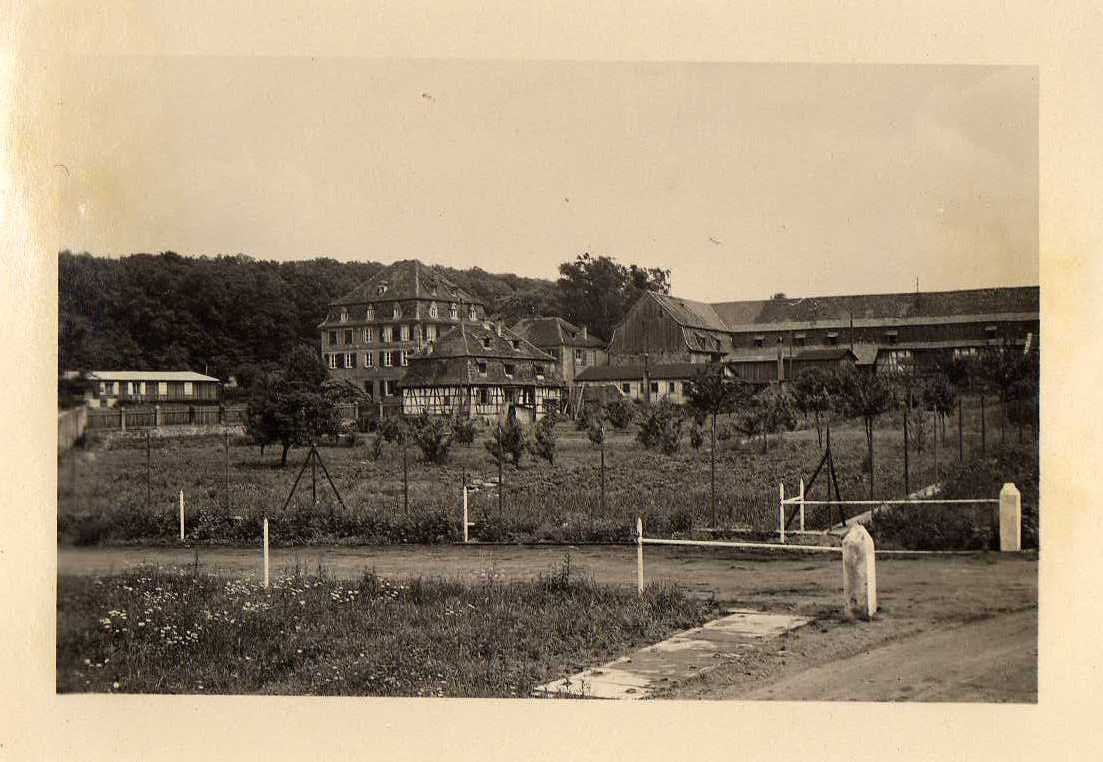
The experimental farm in earlier times.

== First agricultural experiment station ==
Boussingault established the first agricultural experiment station on his wife's property in Pechelbronn in Alsace, France some 60 km north of Strasbourg, France in 1836. Rothamsted in the UK, generally considered the longest continuous experimental station was started some seven years later in 1843, and the German equivalent in Moeckern in 1852. As he was a chemist, which was at that time a rapidly expanding field, and as the application of such science to agriculture was overdue, it is logical that many of Boussingault's contributions from his work related to soil chemical and plant nutritional knowledge.

His experimental station did not survive him, or rather could not withstand the vacillations of the 1870 Franco-Prussian war despite some revealing respect for intellectual works in WWII anecdotes, but his discoveries were built on by others, including his better known contemporary, Liebig – who loudly acknowledged Boussingault as the pioneer and great discoverer of many advances in soil and plant chemistry.

The site of his, the world's first agricultural experimental station, is today a grand Alsatian grange and outbuilding complex in northeastern France in urgent need of restoration (see photo). As of April 2011, an explanatory panel explaining his work has been erected (see photo) correcting some earlier misunderstanding that his experimental work was conducted at another site in the town of Pechelbronn where he maintained a house. The confusion is understandable as the history of the area is dominated by the petroleum technologies developed in that industry, and to which Boussingault contributed as part of his employment in the region. The shadow cast over his work by this more popular subject has led to his status being neglected beyond a cadre of informed scientists and scientific historians.

== Scientific discoveries ==
Boussingault re-introduced the quantitative methods first employed by de Saussure and is credited with the following discoveries related to agriculture:

1. the first analysis of crops grown in a rotation
2. the increase in soil nitrogen following the growth of legume crops
3. the theory (later confirmed by Persoz) that the carbohydrate fraction of a food ration is metabolized to fat in herbivores
4. plant growth is proportional to the amount of available assimilatory nitrogen, which in practical terms allows greater plant growth from the simultaneous application of phosphorus and nitrogen
5. definition of the photosynthetic quotient.

6.Father of field plot technique

== Modern tribute to Boussingault ==
Sometimes scientists are more remembered for their less significant discoveries. Most popular literature lists Boussingault as a contributor to the petroleum development of Alsace, and as being one of the few outsiders who married into the industrialist Le Bel family to be accepted by them in the long term. The mineral Boussingaultite is named after him.

Boussingault's most important work was his contribution to agricultural chemistry. His works and experiments contributed to an understanding of the critical role of nitrogen in plant growth and ecological systems. This understanding made possible further developments in nitrogen harnessing and fertilization, unforeseeable in Boussingault's day. These developments, such as the Haber–Bosch process, eventually resulted in nitrogen fertilizers and related products. Nitrogen fertilizers are a critical component of the modern agricultural industry, and have prevented major food shortages up to the present day.

== Memoirs ==
Boussingault left several volumes of memoirs, which range in subject matter from his very diverse scientific inquiries to his more colorful personal adventures, notably with Bolivar and others in South America.

== See also ==
- Asphaltene – Heavy organic molecular substances that are found in crude oil
- Boussingaultia – A genus of the family Basellaceae
