= Nahcolite =

Mineral form of sodium bicarbonate

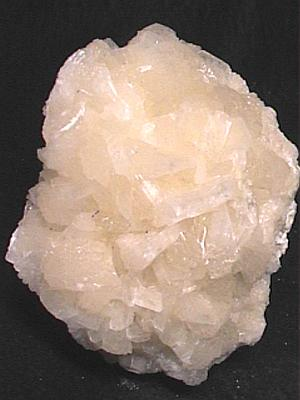
- Nahcolite from California (size: 9.5 x 8 x 4 cm)

General
- Category: Carbonate mineral
- Formula: Sodium bicarbonate (NaHCO_{3})
- IMA symbol: Nah
- Strunz classification: 5.AA.15
- Dana classification: 13.01.01.01
- Crystal system: Monoclinic
- Crystal class: Prismatic (2/m) (same H-M symbol)
- Space group: P2_{1}/n
- Unit cell: a = 7.47, b = 9.68 c = 3.48 [Å]; β = 93.38°; Z = 4

Identification
- Colour: White to colourless, may be grey to brown
- Crystal habit: Elongated crystals, fibrous masses, friable porous aggregates
- Twinning: Common on [101]
- Cleavage: {101} perfect, {111} good, {100} distinct
- Fracture: Conchoidal
- Tenacity: Brittle
- Mohs scale hardness: 2.5
- Lustre: Vitreous – resinous
- Streak: White
- Diaphaneity: Transparent to translucent
- Specific gravity: 2.21
- Optical properties: Biaxial (−)
- Refractive index: n_{α} = 1.377 n_{β} = 1.503 n_{γ} = 1.583
- Birefringence: δ = 0.206
- Ultraviolet fluorescence: Short UV=blue-white cream-yellow, Long UV=cream-yellow
- Solubility: Soluble in water

Nahcolite is a soft, colourless or white carbonate mineral with the composition of sodium bicarbonate (NaHCO_{3}) also called thermokalite. It crystallizes in the monoclinic system.

Nahcolite was first described in 1928 for an occurrence in a lava tunnel at Mount Vesuvius, Italy. Its name refers to the elements which compose it: Na, H, C, and O. It occurs as a hot spring and saline lake precipitate or efflorescence; in differentiated alkalic massifs; in fluid inclusions as a daughter mineral phase and in evaporite deposits.

It occurs in association with trona, thermonatrite, thenardite, halite, gaylussite, burkeite, northupite and borax. It has been reported in a Roman conduit at Stufe de Nerone, Campi Flegrei, near Naples; in the United States from Searles Lake, San Bernardino County, California; in the Green River Formation, Colorado and Utah; in the Tincalayu deposit, Salar del Hombre Muerto, Salta Province, Argentina; on Mt. Alluaiv, Lovozero Massif and Khibiny Massif, Kola Peninsula, Russia; and around Mount Erebus, Victoria Land, Antarctica.

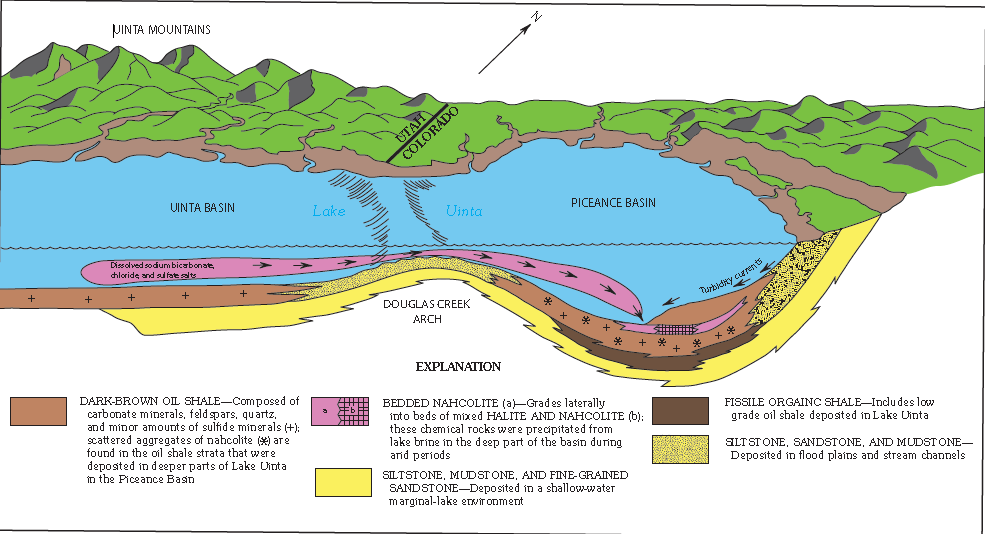
Nahcolite deposition model in the Uinta–Piceance basin system, United States
