= Ciner Group =

Turkish industrial conglomerate

Ciner Group A.Ş.
- Company type: Anonim Şirket
- Founded: 7 March 1978; 48 years ago
- Headquarters: Üsküdar, Istanbul, Turkey
- Key people: Turgay Ciner (Chairman and President)
- Number of employees: 9,700
- Website: cinergroup.com.tr/en

Ciner Group (known as Park Holding until December 1994) is a Turkish family-owned conglomerate that operates in four main sectors: energy and mining, natural soda ash, container glass, and shipping. Ciner Group was formed in 1978 and is majority-owned by Turgay Ciner.

== Operations ==
=== WE Soda ===
WE Soda is a soda ash producer. The company was founded in 2009 at the Eti Soda plant and is located in the Beypazarı district of Ankara. It operates two large facilities in Turkey, producing over five million tons of natural soda ash annually, which is sold in almost eighty countries around the world. Following the acquisition of Trona reserves from Rio Tinto in 2010, the neighboring Kazan Soda Elektrik plant was officially opened in 2018. In 2015, Ciner acquired a majority stake in OCI Chemical Corporation, which was later renamed Ciner Resources Corporation. This company operates a soda ash facility in the Green River Basin in Wyoming, US. In November 2021, Ciner Group announced it had sold 60% of its US soda ash business to the American company Sisecam Chemicals.

=== Ciner Glass ===
Ciner acquired land in the Bozüyük Industrial Zone in 2011 to produce glass packaging products. Park Glass opened its first production line in 2013 and completed its second line in 2015. A third furnace is under construction at its Park Cam facility. The company produces 1,000 tons of glass per day. In Europe, the UK-based Ciner Glass announced expansion plans in 2021 and 2022 for new manufacturing sites to be based in Belgium and South Wales. In May 2020, Ciner Glass announced it would establish a glass container bottle manufacturing plant in Ebbw Vale, Wales. The plant is expected to create 600 jobs. The company received planning permission to begin work on the site in June 2022. In February 2023, Ciner Glass acquired a site at Lommel in Belgium to build a glass container facility.

=== Energy and mining ===
In 2000, Turgay Ciner refocused one of his textile businesses on the energy sector and formed Park Electric. In 2003, the firm established the Şırnak Silopi power station. The first 135 MW unit was commissioned in 2009, with two additional 135 MW units developed in 2015 to bring installation capacity up to 405 MW. Park Electric sold its copper mine assets in March 2017, and the company redirected its business towards energy and bought the Konya Ilgin thermal power plant. Turgay Ciner set up the thermal power company Park Thermic and bought the Çayırhan power station, which became the first privatized thermal power plant in Turkey.

=== Ciner Shipping ===
Ciner Shipping Holding is a Malta-based holding company that initially had a fleet of 29 vessels comprising bulk cargo, tankers, and container ships. Ciner Shipping currently has 22 bulk carriers. Park Shipping has been operating Hopa Port at the eastern edge of the Black Sea since its privatization in 1997. It provides docking facilities for around 250 ships a year.

=== Ciner Media ===
Ciner Media previously operated three TV channels in Turkey, alongside other media interests. Turgay Ciner's entry into the sector started with a partnership with Sabah Group in 1998. After this venture ended, Ciner Group purchased Kanal 1 and the Habertürk channel. The Habertürk newspaper discontinued their print publication in July 2018 and became an online-only platform. In 2010, Ciner launched Bloomberg HT, a 24-hour financial news channel in a partnership with the global news and business information service Bloomberg Media. These assets were sold to Can Group in 2025, a deal announced in December 2024.

== Greenhouse gas emissions ==
Climate TRACE estimates the company's two coal-fired power stations emitted over five million tons of the country's total 730 million tons of greenhouse gas in 2022, and it has been placed on the Urgewald Global Coal Exit List.

== See also ==
- Energy policy of Turkey
