= Gaylussite =

Carbonate mineral

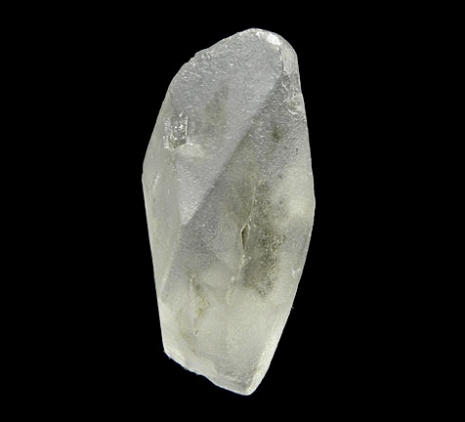

General
- Category: Carbonate mineral
- Formula: Na_{2}Ca(CO_{3})_{2}·5H_{2}O
- IMA symbol: Gyl
- Strunz classification: 5.CB.35
- Crystal system: Monoclinic
- Crystal class: Prismatic (2/m) (same H-M symbol)
- Space group: I2/a

Identification
- Color: Colorless, white, yellow, and grey
- Crystal habit: Tabular prismatic crystals also granular
- Cleavage: perfect [110]
- Fracture: Conchoidal, brittle
- Mohs scale hardness: 2.5
- Luster: vitreous
- Streak: white
- Specific gravity: 1.93 – 1.99
- Optical properties: Biaxial (−)
- Refractive index: nα = 1.444 nβ = 1.516 nγ = 1.523
- Birefringence: δ = 0.079
- Solubility: decomposes in water
- Other characteristics: efflorescent

Gaylussite is a carbonate mineral, a hydrated sodium calcium carbonate, formula Na_{2}Ca(CO_{3})_{2}·5H_{2}O. It occurs as translucent, vitreous white to grey to yellow monoclinic prismatic crystals. It is an unstable mineral which dehydrates in dry air and decomposes in water.

== Discovery and occurrence ==
It is formed as an evaporite from alkali lacustrine waters. It also occurs rarely as veinlets in alkalic igneous rocks. It was first described in 1826 for an occurrence in Lagunillas, Mérida, Venezuela. It was named for French chemist Joseph Louis Gay-Lussac (1778–1850).

The mineral has been recently (2014) reported from drill core in Lonar lake in Buldhana district, Maharashtra, India. Lonar lake was created by a meteor impact during the Pleistocene Epoch and it is one of only four known hyper-velocity impact craters in basaltic rock anywhere on Earth.
