= Sodium carbonate =

Chemical compound

- Skeletal formula of sodium carbonate

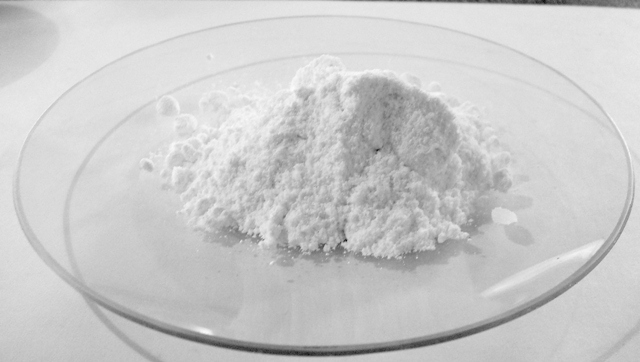
- Sample of sodium carbonate

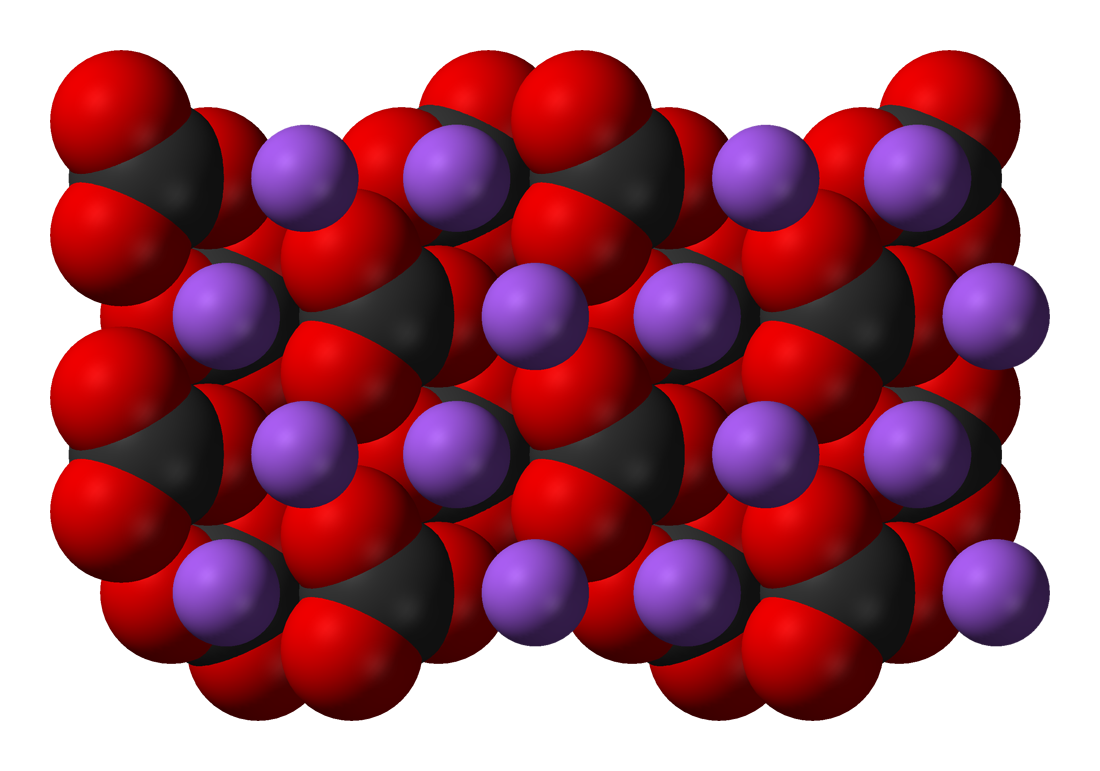

Names
- IUPAC name Sodium carbonate
- Other names Soda ash, washing soda, soda crystals, sodium trioxocarbonate

Identifiers
CAS Number	497-19-8 (anhydrous); 5968-11-6 (monohydrate); 6132-02-1 (decahydrate)
3D model (JSmol)	Interactive image
ChEBI	CHEBI:29377
ChEMBL	ChEMBL186314
ChemSpider	9916
ECHA InfoCard	100.007.127
EC Number	207-838-8
E number	E500(i) (acidity regulators, ...)
PubChem CID	10340
RTECS number	VZ4050000
UNII	45P3261C7T; 2A1Q1Q3557 (monohydrate); LS505BG22I (decahydrate)
CompTox Dashboard (EPA)	DTXSID1029621
- InChI: InChI=1S/CH2O3.2Na/c2-1(3)4;;/h(H2,2,3,4);;/q;2*+1/p-2 Key: CDBYLPFSWZWCQE-UHFFFAOYSA-L; InChI=1/NaHCO3.2Na/c2-1(3)4;;/h(H2,2,3,4);;/q;2*+1/p-2 Key: CDBYLPFSWZWCQE-NUQVWONBAP
- SMILES: [Na+].[Na+].[O-]C([O-])=O

Properties
Chemical formula	Na_{2}CO_{3}
Molar mass	105.9888 g/mol (anhydrous); 286.1416 g/mol (decahydrate)
Appearance	White solid, hygroscopic
Odor	Odorless
Density	2.54 g/cm^{3} (25 °C, anhydrous); 1.92 g/cm^{3} (856 °C); 2.25 g/cm^{3} (monohydrate); 1.51 g/cm^{3} (heptahydrate); 1.46 g/cm^{3} (decahydrate)
Melting point	851 °C (1,564 °F; 1,124 K) (Anhydrous); 100 °C (212 °F; 373 K) decomposes (monohydrate); 33.5 °C (92.3 °F; 306.6 K) decomposes (heptahydrate); 34 °C (93 °F; 307 K) (decahydrate)
Solubility in water	Anhydrous, g/100 mL: 7 (0 °C); 16.4 (15 °C); 34.07 (27.8 °C); 48.69 (34.8 °C); 48.1 (41.9 °C); 45.62 (60 °C); 43.6 (100 °C)
Solubility	Soluble in aq. alkalis, glycerol Slightly soluble in aq. alcohol Insoluble in CS_{2}, acetone, alkyl acetates, alcohol, benzonitrile, liquid ammonia
Solubility in glycerine	98.3 g/100 g (155 °C)
Solubility in ethanediol	3.46 g/100 g (20 °C)
Solubility in dimethylformamide	0.5 g/kg
Acidity (pK_{a})	10.33
Magnetic susceptibility (χ)	−4.1·10^{−5} cm^{3}/mol
Refractive index (n_{D})	1.485 (anhydrous); 1.420 (monohydrate); 1.405 (decahydrate)
Viscosity	3.4 cP (887 °C)

Structure
Crystal structure	Monoclinic (γ-form, β-form, δ-form, anhydrous); Orthorhombic (monohydrate, heptahydrate)
Space group	C2/m, No. 12 (γ-form, anhydrous, 170 K); C2/m, No. 12 (β-form, anhydrous, 628 K); P2_{1}/n, No. 14 (δ-form, anhydrous, 110 K); Pca2_{1}, No. 29 (monohydrate); Pbca, No. 61 (heptahydrate)
Point group	2/m (γ-form, β-form, δ-form, anhydrous) mm2 (monohydrate); 2/m 2/m 2/m (heptahydrate)
Lattice constant	a = 8.920(7) Å, b = 5.245(5) Å, c = 6.050(5) Å (γ-form, anhydrous, 295 K) α = 90°, β = 101.35(8)°, γ = 90°
Coordination geometry	Octahedral (Na^{+}, anhydrous)

Thermochemistry
Heat capacity (C)	112.3 J/mol·K
Std molar entropy (S^{⦵}_{298})	135 J/mol·K
Std enthalpy of formation (Δ_{f}H^{⦵}_{298})	−1130.7 kJ/mol
Gibbs free energy (Δ_{f}G^{⦵})	−1044.4 kJ/mol

Hazards
- Occupational safety and health (OHS/OSH)
Main hazards	Irritant
- GHS labelling
Pictograms	(GHS07: Exclamation mark)
Signal word	Warning
Hazard statements	H313+H333, H319
Precautionary statements	P305+P351+P338
NFPA 704 (fire diamond)	2 0 0
- Lethal dose or concentration (LD, LC)
LD_{50} (median dose)	4090 mg/kg (rat, oral)
Safety data sheet (SDS)	MSDS

Related compounds
Other anions	Sodium bicarbonate
Other cations	Lithium carbonate Potassium carbonate Rubidium carbonate Cesium carbonate
Related compounds	Sodium sesquicarbonate Sodium percarbonate
- Except where otherwise noted, data are given for materials in their standard state (at 25 °C [77 °F], 100 kPa). verify (what is ?) Infobox references

Sodium carbonate (also known as washing soda, soda ash, sal soda, and soda crystals) is the inorganic compound with the formula Na_{2}CO_{3} and its various hydrates. All forms are white, odorless, water-soluble salts that yield alkaline solutions in water. Historically, it was extracted from the ashes of plants grown in sodium-rich soils, and because the ashes of these sodium-rich plants were noticeably different from ashes of wood (once used to produce potash), sodium carbonate became known as "soda ash". It is produced in large quantities from sodium chloride and limestone by the Solvay process, as well as by carbonating sodium hydroxide which is made using the chloralkali process.

== Hydrates ==
Sodium carbonate is obtained as three hydrates and as the anhydrous salt:

- sodium carbonate decahydrate (natron), Na_{2}CO_{3} · 10 H_{2}O, which readily effloresces to form the monohydrate.
- sodium carbonate heptahydrate (not known in mineral form), Na_{2}CO_{3} · 7 H_{2}O.
- sodium carbonate monohydrate (thermonatrite), Na_{2}CO_{3} · H_{2}O. Also known as crystal carbonate.
- anhydrous sodium carbonate (natrite), also known as calcined soda, is formed by heating the hydrates. It is also formed when sodium hydrogencarbonate is heated (calcined) e.g. in the final step of the Solvay process.

The decahydrate is formed from water solutions crystallizing in the temperature range −2.1 to 32.0 °C, the heptahydrate in the narrow range 32.0 to 35.4 °C and above this temperature the monohydrate forms. In dry air the decahydrate and heptahydrate lose water to give the monohydrate. Other hydrates have been reported, e.g. with 2.5 units of water per sodium carbonate unit ("Penta hemihydrate").

=== Washing soda ===
Sodium carbonate decahydrate (Na_{2}CO_{3} · 10 H_{2}O), also known as washing soda, is the most common hydrate of sodium carbonate containing 10 molecules of water of crystallization. Soda ash is dissolved in water and crystallized to get washing soda.

Na_{2}CO_{3} + 10 H_{2}O → Na_{2}CO_{3} · 10 H_{2}O

It is one of the few metal carbonates that are soluble in water.

== Applications ==
Some common applications of sodium carbonate include:

- As a cleansing agent for domestic purposes like washing clothes. Sodium carbonate is a component of many dry soap powders. It has detergent properties through the process of saponification, which converts fats and grease to water-soluble salts (specifically, soaps).
- It is used for lowering the hardness of water (see § Water softening).
- It is used in the manufacture of glass, soap, and paper.
- It is used in the manufacture of sodium compounds like borax (sodium borate).

=== Glass manufacture ===
Sodium carbonate serves as a flux for silica (SiO_{2}, melting point 1,713 °C), lowering the melting point of the mixture to something achievable without special materials. This "soda glass" is mildly water-soluble, so some calcium carbonate is added to the melt mixture to make the glass insoluble. Bottle and window glass ("soda–lime glass" with transition temperature ~570 °C) is made by melting such mixtures of sodium carbonate, calcium carbonate, and silica sand (silicon dioxide (SiO_{2})). When these materials are heated, the carbonates release carbon dioxide. In this way, sodium carbonate is a source of sodium oxide. Soda–lime glass has been the most common form of glass for centuries. It is also a key input for tableware glass manufacturing.

=== Water softening ===
Hard water usually contains calcium or magnesium ions. Sodium carbonate is used for removing these ions and replacing them with sodium ions.

Sodium carbonate is a water-soluble source of carbonate. The calcium and magnesium ions form insoluble solid precipitates upon treatment with carbonate ions.

Ca^{2+}(aq) + CO^{2−}_{3}(aq) → CaCO_{3}(s)

The water is softened because it no longer contains dissolved calcium ions and magnesium ions.

=== Food additive and cooking ===
Sodium carbonate has several uses in cuisine, largely because it is a stronger base than baking soda (sodium bicarbonate) but weaker than lye (which may refer to sodium hydroxide or, less commonly, potassium hydroxide). Alkalinity affects gluten production in kneaded doughs, and also improves browning by reducing the temperature at which the Maillard reaction occurs. To take advantage of the former effect, sodium carbonate is therefore one of the components of kansui (かん水), a solution of alkaline salts used to give Japanese ramen noodles their characteristic flavour and chewy texture; a similar solution is used in Chinese cuisine to make lamian, for similar reasons. Cantonese bakers similarly use sodium carbonate as a substitute for lye-water to give moon cakes their characteristic texture and improve browning. In German cuisine (and Central European cuisine more broadly), breads such as pretzels and lye rolls traditionally treated with lye to improve browning can be treated instead with sodium carbonate; sodium carbonate does not produce quite as strong a browning as lye, but is much safer and easier to work with.

Sodium carbonate is used in the production of sherbet powder. The cooling and fizzing sensation results from the endothermic reaction between sodium carbonate and a weak acid, commonly citric acid, releasing carbon dioxide gas, which occurs when the sherbet is moistened by saliva.

Sodium carbonate also finds use in the food industry as a food additive (European Food Safety Authority number E500) as an acidity regulator, anticaking agent, raising agent, and stabilizer. It is also used in the production of snus to stabilize the pH of the final product.

=== Other applications ===
Sodium carbonate is also used as a relatively strong base in various fields. As a common alkali, it is preferred in many chemical processes because it is cheaper than sodium hydroxide and far safer to handle. Its mildness especially recommends its use in domestic applications.

For example, it is used as a pH regulator to maintain stable alkaline conditions necessary for the action of the majority of photographic film developing agents. It is also a common additive in swimming pools and aquarium water to maintain a desired pH and carbonate hardness (KH). In dyeing with fiber-reactive dyes, sodium carbonate (often under a name such as soda ash fixative or soda ash activator) is used as mordant to ensure proper chemical bonding of the dye with cellulose (plant) fiber. It is also used in the froth flotation process to maintain a favourable pH as a float conditioner besides CaO and other mildly basic compounds.

=== Precursor to other compounds ===
Sodium bicarbonate (NaHCO_{3}) or baking soda, also a component in fire extinguishers, is often generated from sodium carbonate. Although NaHCO_{3} is itself an intermediate product of the Solvay process, the heating needed to remove the ammonia that contaminates it decomposes some NaHCO_{3}, making it more economical to react finished Na_{2}CO_{3} with CO_{2}:

Na_{2}CO_{3} + CO_{2} + H_{2}O → 2 NaHCO_{3}

In a related reaction, sodium carbonate is used to make sodium bisulfite (NaHSO_{3}), which is used for the "sulfite" method of separating lignin from cellulose. This reaction is exploited for removing sulfur dioxide from flue gases in power stations:

Na_{2}CO_{3} + SO_{2} + H_{2}O → NaHCO_{3} + NaHSO_{3}

This application has become more common, especially where stations have to meet stringent emission controls.

Sodium carbonate is used by the cotton industry to neutralize the sulfuric acid needed for acid delinting of fuzzy cottonseed.

It is also used to form carbonates of other metals by ion exchange, often with the sulfates of other metals.

=== Miscellaneous ===
Sodium carbonate is used by the brick industry as a wetting agent to reduce the amount of water needed to extrude the clay. In casting, it is referred to as "bonding agent" and is used to allow wet alginate to adhere to gelled alginate. Sodium carbonate is used in toothpastes, where it acts as a foaming agent and an abrasive, and to temporarily increase mouth pH.

Sodium carbonate is also used in the processing and tanning of animal hides to neutralize acids.

As a precursor to an ingredient in sodium-ion battery, sodium carbonate costs 1% of what lithium carbonate costs for lithium-ion battery.

== Physical properties ==
The integral enthalpy of solution of sodium carbonate is −26.7 kJ/mol. The Mohs hardness of sodium carbonate monohydrate is 1.3.

== Occurrence in nature ==
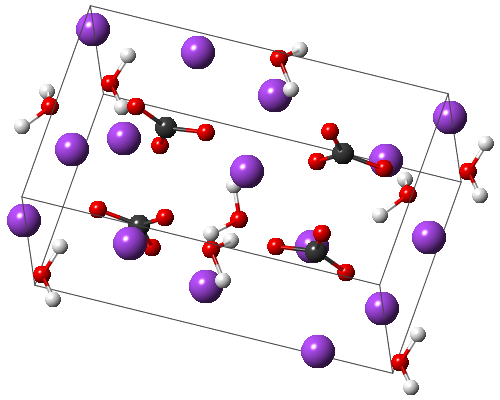
Structure of monohydrate at 346 K

Sodium carbonate is soluble in water, and can occur naturally in arid regions, especially in mineral deposits (evaporites) formed when seasonal lakes evaporate. Deposits of the mineral natron have been mined from dry lake bottoms in Egypt since ancient times, when natron was used in the preparation of mummies and in the early manufacture of glass.

The anhydrous mineral form of sodium carbonate is quite rare and called natrite. Sodium carbonate also erupts from Ol Doinyo Lengai, Tanzania's unique volcano, and it is presumed to have erupted from other volcanoes in the past, but due to the instability of these metals at the Earth's surface, are likely to be eroded. All three mineralogical forms of sodium carbonate, as well as trona, trisodium hydrogen dicarbonate dihydrate, are also known from ultra-alkaline pegmatitic rocks, that occur for example in the Kola Peninsula in Russia.

Beyond Earth, sodium carbonate is rare. Deposits have been identified as the source of bright spots on Ceres, interior material that has been brought to the surface. While there are carbonates on Mars, and these are expected to include sodium carbonate, deposits have yet to be confirmed, this absence is explained by some as being due to a global dominance of low pH in previously aqueous Martian soil.

== Production ==
The initial large-scale chemical procedure was established in England in 1823 to manufacture soda ash.

=== Mining ===
Trona, also known as trisodium hydrogendicarbonate dihydrate (Na_{3}HCO_{3}CO_{3} · 2 H_{2}O), is mined in several areas of the US and provides nearly all the US consumption of sodium carbonate. Large natural deposits found in 1938, such as the one near Green River, Wyoming, have made mining more economical than industrial production in North America. There are important reserves of trona in Turkey; two million tons of soda ash have been extracted from the reserves near Ankara.

=== Barilla and kelp ===
Several "halophyte" (salt-tolerant) plant species and seaweed species can be processed to yield an impure form of sodium carbonate, and these sources predominated in Europe and elsewhere until the early 19th century. The land plants (typically glassworts or saltworts) or the seaweed (typically Fucus species) were harvested, dried, and burned. The ashes were then "lixivated" (washed with water) to form an alkali solution. This solution was boiled dry to create the final product, which was termed "soda ash"; this very old name derives from the Arabic word soda, in turn applied to Salsola soda, one of the many species of seashore plants harvested for production. "Barilla" is a commercial term applied to an impure form of potash obtained from coastal plants or kelp.

The sodium carbonate concentration in soda ash varied very widely, from 2–3 percent for the seaweed-derived form ("kelp"), to 30 percent for the best barilla produced from saltwort plants in Spain. Plant and seaweed sources for soda ash, and also for the related alkali "potash", became increasingly inadequate by the end of the 18th century, and the search for commercially viable routes to synthesizing soda ash from salt and other chemicals intensified.

=== Leblanc process ===
In 1792, the French chemist Nicolas Leblanc patented a process for producing sodium carbonate from salt, sulfuric acid, limestone, and coal. In the first step, sodium chloride is treated with sulfuric acid in the Mannheim process. This reaction produces sodium sulfate (salt cake) and hydrogen chloride:

2 NaCl + H_{2}SO_{4} → Na_{2}SO_{4} + 2 HCl

The salt cake and crushed limestone (calcium carbonate) was reduced by heating with coal. This conversion entails two parts. First is the carbothermic reaction whereby the coal, a source of carbon, reduces the sulfate to sulfide:

Na_{2}SO_{4} + 2 C → Na_{2}S + 2 CO_{2}

The second stage is the reaction to produce sodium carbonate and calcium sulfide:

Na_{2}S + CaCO_{3} → Na_{2}CO_{3} + CaS

This mixture is called black ash. The soda ash is extracted from the black ash with water. Evaporation of this extract yields solid sodium carbonate. This extraction process was termed lixiviating.

The hydrochloric acid produced by the Leblanc process was a major source of air pollution, and the calcium sulfide byproduct also presented waste disposal issues. However, it remained the major production method for sodium carbonate until the late 1880s.

=== Solvay process ===
In 1861, the Belgian industrial chemist Ernest Solvay developed a method for making sodium carbonate by first reacting sodium chloride, ammonia, water, and carbon dioxide to generate sodium bicarbonate and ammonium chloride:

NaCl + NH_{3} + CO_{2} + H_{2}O → NaHCO_{3} + NH_{4}Cl

The resulting sodium bicarbonate was then converted to sodium carbonate by heating it, releasing water and carbon dioxide:

2 NaHCO_{3} → Na_{2}CO_{3} + H_{2}O + CO_{2}

Meanwhile, the ammonia was regenerated from the ammonium chloride byproduct by treating it with the lime (calcium oxide) left over from carbon dioxide generation:

2 NH_{4}Cl + CaO → 2 NH_{3} + CaCl_{2} + H_{2}O

The Solvay process recycles its ammonia. It consumes only brine and limestone, and calcium chloride is its only waste product. The process is substantially more economical than the Leblanc process, which generates two waste products, calcium sulfide and hydrogen chloride. The Solvay process quickly came to dominate sodium carbonate production worldwide. By 1900, 90% of sodium carbonate was produced by the Solvay process, and the last Leblanc process plant closed in the early 1920s.

The second step of the Solvay process, heating sodium bicarbonate, is used on a small scale by home cooks and in restaurants to make sodium carbonate for culinary purposes (including pretzels and alkali noodles). The method is appealing to such users because sodium bicarbonate is widely sold as baking soda, and the temperatures needed (250 °F (121 °C) to 300 °F (149 °C)) to convert baking soda to sodium carbonate are readily achieved in conventional kitchen ovens.

=== Hou's process ===
This process was developed by Chinese chemist Hou Debang in the 1930s. The earlier steam reforming by-product carbon dioxide was pumped through a saturated solution of sodium chloride and ammonia to produce sodium bicarbonate by these reactions:

CH_{4} + 2 H_{2}O → CO_{2} + 4 H_{2}
3 H_{2} + N_{2} → 2 NH_{3}
NH_{3} + CO_{2} + H_{2}O → NH_{4}HCO_{3}
NH_{4}HCO_{3} + NaCl → NH_{4}Cl + NaHCO_{3}

The sodium bicarbonate was collected as a precipitate due to its low solubility and then heated up to approximately 80 °C (176 °F) or 95 °C (203 °F) to yield pure sodium carbonate similar to last step of the Solvay process. More sodium chloride is added to the remaining solution of ammonium and sodium chlorides; also, more ammonia is pumped at 30–40 °C to this solution. The solution temperature is then lowered to below 10 °C. Solubility of ammonium chloride is higher than that of sodium chloride at 30 °C and lower at 10 °C. Due to this temperature-dependent solubility difference and the common-ion effect, ammonium chloride is precipitated in a sodium chloride solution.

The Chinese name of Hou's process, lianhe zhijian fa (联合制碱法), means "coupled manufacturing alkali method": Hou's process is coupled to the Haber process and offers better atom economy by eliminating the production of calcium chloride, since any ammonia generated gets used by the reaction. The by-product ammonium chloride can be sold as a fertilizer.

== See also ==
- Residual sodium carbonate index
