= Sodium sesquicarbonate =

Identifiers
CAS Number	533-96-0; trona: 6106-20-3
3D model (JSmol)	Interactive image; trona: Interactive image
ChemSpider	trona: 21614031
ECHA InfoCard	100.007.802
EC Number	208-580-9
PubChem CID	10791; trona: 91886149
UNII	Y1X815621J
CompTox Dashboard (EPA)	DTXSID6049646
- InChI: InChI=1S/2CH2O3.3Na/c2*2-1(3)4;;;/h2*(H2,2,3,4);;;/q;;3*+1/p-3 Key: WCTAGTRAWPDFQO-UHFFFAOYSA-K; trona: InChI=1S/2CH2O3.3Na.2H2O/c2*2-1(3)4;;;;;/h2*(H2,2,3,4);;;;2*1H2/q;;3*+1;;/p-3 Key: YVDUOWXDYAOZMD-UHFFFAOYSA-K
- SMILES: C(=O)(O)[O-].C(=O)([O-])[O-].[Na+].[Na+].[Na+]; trona: C(=O)(O)[O-].C(=O)([O-])[O-].O.O.[Na+].[Na+].[Na+]

Properties
Chemical formula	Na_{3}H(CO_{3})_{2}·2H_{2}O
Appearance	white, needle-like
Density	2.112 g/cm^{3} (dihydrate)
Solubility in water	dihydrate 13 g/100 mL (0 °C); 42 g/100 mL (100 °C)
Refractive index (n_{D})	1.5073 (dihydrate)

Structure
Crystal structure	monoclinic (dihydrate)
- Except where otherwise noted, data are given for materials in their standard state (at 25 °C [77 °F], 100 kPa). Infobox references

Sodium sesquicarbonate (systematic name: trisodium hydrogendicarbonate) Na_{3}H(CO_{3})_{2} is a double salt of sodium bicarbonate and sodium carbonate (NaHCO_{3} · Na_{2}CO_{3}), and has a needle-like crystal structure. However, the term is also applied to an equimolar mixture of those two salts, with whatever water of hydration the sodium carbonate includes, supplied as a powder.

The dihydrate, Na_{3}H(CO_{3})_{2} · 2H_{2}O, occurs in nature as the evaporite mineral trona.

Due to concerns about the toxicity of borax which was withdrawn as a cleaning and laundry product, sodium sesquicarbonate is sold in the European Union (EU) as "Borax substitute". It is also known as one of the E number food additives E500(iii).

The thermal decomposition of solid sodium sesquicarbonate has been studied at temperatures between 350 and 487 K in nitrogen and carbon dioxide atmospheres

== Uses ==
Sodium sesquicarbonate is used in bath salts, swimming pools, as an alkalinity source for water treatment, and as a phosphate-free product replacing the trisodium phosphate for heavy duty cleaning.

Sodium sesquicarbonate is used in the conservation of copper and copper alloy artifacts that corrode due to contact with salt (called "bronze disease" due to its effect on bronze). The chloride from salt forms copper(I) chloride. In the presence of oxygen and water, even the small amount of moisture in the atmosphere, the cuprous chloride forms copper(II) chloride and hydrochloric acid, the latter of which dissolves the metal and forms more cuprous chloride in a self-sustaining reaction that leads to the entire destruction of the object. Treatment with sodium sesquicarbonate removes copper(II) chlorides from the corroded layer.

It is also used as a precipitating water softener, which combines with hard water minerals (calcium- and magnesium-based minerals) to form an insoluble precipitate, removing these hardness minerals from the water. It is the carbonate moiety which forms the precipitate, the bicarbonate being included to moderate the material's alkalinity.

In Chinese cuisine, it is known as mǎyájiǎn (simplified:马牙碱 traditional: 馬牙鹼) which roughly translates to “horse tooth alkaline” and traditionally used as an ingredient in the marinade for century eggs, a dish generally made from duck eggs preserved whole in a highly alkaline mixture.
