= Muzaffer Tekin =

- Born: October 28, 1950; Çankırı
- Died: April 1, 2015 (aged 64)
- Buried: Karacaahmet Cemetery
- Allegiance: Turkey
- Branch: Turkish Land Forces
- Service years: 1972–1985
- Rank: Captain
- Conflicts: Turkish invasion of Cyprus
- Awards: Turkish Armed Forces Medal of Distinguished Courage and Self-Sacrifice
- Spouse: Müge Tekin (before 2015)
- Children: 1

Muzaffer Tekin (28 October 1950, in Çankırı – 1 April 2015) is a former member, of Turkey's Special Warfare Department, and a suspect in the Ergenekon trials as well, as the Turkish Council of State shooting. In August 2013, Tekin was sentenced to consecutive life sentences.

== Career ==
Tekin graduated from the Turkish Military Academy in 1972, where he had been a classmate of Cem Ersever, and served in the Special Warfare Department. He participated in the Turkish invasion of Cyprus, and according to Oktay Yıldırım was "the only lieutenant who ever received a gold medal for his work in the Cyprus Peace Operation". He was forced to retire in 1986, having reached the rank of captain, due to a Supreme Military Council (YAŞ) decision in relation to a fight Tekin was involved in. In 2007 he said that he had served in the armed forces together with Oktay Yıldırım, and said that Yıldırım was "like my son".

Tekin was a partner in finance company Doğuş Factoring, in which Turkish Council of State shooter Alparslan Arslan worked as a lawyer. In 2007 Sabah published claims, which it said were based on German police reports, that Doğuş Factoring had been used to launder drug money, and that Tekin was the lead organiser of the drug operations.

== Trials ==
Days after the Turkish Council of State shooting, the National Intelligence Organization (MIT), and police intelligence said they had had Tekin under surveillance for six months, as part of an investigation into the Vatansever Kuvvetler Güç Birliği Hareketi.

On 5 August 2013, Tekin was sentenced to consecutive life sentences.

On 10 March 2014, upper courts determined, that the rulings made in the Ergenekon case, were improper and therefore released all prisoners. Since all these cases were proven to be a set up against the Turkish military forces with the intent to weaken them.
