= Osman Gürbüz =

Turkish criminal (born 1962)

Osman Gürbüz (born 1962 in Kemah, Erzincan) is a Turkish criminal. He was detained in the frame of the Ergenekon investigation for some unsolved murders.

Gürbüz used to be a member of the nationalist Kuvvayi Milliye Derneği (National Forces Society). Its founder, Fikri Karadağ (also under custody), allegedly expelled Gürbüz from the organization. Gürbüz is also alleged to be affiliated with other illegal organizations.

Gürbüz killed his brother in 1990, wounded his ex-wife and her sibling in 1991, sprayed an Ankara night club with bullets in 1994, and killed a policeman also that year. He was apprehended in 1997, but released in 2000 under an amnesty law (Turkish: Şartlı Salıverme Yasası).

Gürbüz is allegedly connected to the following incidents:

- Gazi incident (1995). A cafe frequented by Alevis was gunned down, sparking the 1995 Gazi Quarter riots.
- Disappearance of HADEP deputies Serdar Tanış and Ebubekir Deniz in Silopi (2000). Ergenekon suspect brigadier general Levent Ersöz is also named in connection to this crime (for threatening the victims). Gürbüz allegedly worked with Ersöz in the Gendarmerie (Turkey)'s then-illegal counter-terrorism wing, JITEM.
- Death of Kemalist academic Necip Hablemitoğlu (2002). Gürbüz was allegedly offered the job of after convict Osman Yıldırım turned it down, however Gürbüz denies this.

Prime Minister Mesut Yılmaz said that Gürbüz was connected to the Interior Minister, Mehmet Ağar, but Ağar denies this.
