= The Imam's Army =

2011 Turkish book by Ahmet Şık

- First edition
- Author: Ahmet Şık
- Original title: İmamın Ordusu
- Language: Turkish
- Publication date: 2011
- Publication place: Turkey

The Imam's Army (Turkish: İmamın Ordusu) is a book by Turkish journalist Ahmet Şık on the life and work of Fethullah Gülen and his Gülen movement. Şık was detained in March 2011, before the book was published, and the draft book was seized by the government and banned, claiming it was an "illegal organizational document" of the secret organization Ergenekon. Şık was detained pending trial, being eventually released pending trial in March 2012. In the interim, in an act of anti-censorship defiance, a version of the book was released in November 2011 under the name 000Kitap/OOOKitap (000Book or It's-Thaat-Book), edited by 125 journalists, activists and academics, and published by Postacı Publishing House.

== Events ==
On 3 March 2011 eleven people were detained in Istanbul and Ankara, including the journalists Ahmet Şık and Nedim Şener. On 6 March they and another seven people were arrested on the allegation they were members of the secret organization Ergenekon. On or around 23 March Istanbul Heavy Penal Court 12 ordered the confiscation of a draft for a book that Ahmet Şık wanted to publish under the title of "The Imam's Army". On 1 April 2011 unknown people made the book available on the Internet, and over 200,000 copies were downloaded.

Şık was indicted in the Ergenekon Odatv case because of The Imam's Army, a copy of which was allegedly found on odatv computers. On 26 August 2011 İstanbul prosecutor Cihan Kansız sent a 134-page indictment on 14 defendants, 12 of them in pre-trial detention to the newly founded Istanbul Heavy Penal Court 16. One of the imprisoned defendants was Ahmet Şık. The charges included membership or support of an armed organization and incitement to hatred and enmity. Ahmet Şık was charged with support of an armed organization. On 13 September 2011 Istanbul Heavy Penal Court 16 decided that the trial would start on 22 November 2011.

The printing house, İthaki, was the publisher that owned the rights to "İmamın Ordusu" (The Army of the Imam), but in an act of anti-censorship defiance, a version of the book was released in November 2011 under the name 000Kitap (000Book), edited by 125 journalists, activists and academics, and published by Postacı Publishing House.

Şık was released pending trial on 12 March 2012 along with fellow defendants Coşkun Musluk, Sait Çakır, and Nedim Şener.

== Summary ==
The book deals with the religious community of the Turkish Islamic preacher and former imam Fethullah Gülen, usually referred to as the Gülen movement. This fact has led to suspicions that Şık was arrested due to the book's contents, rather than his involvement in the alleged Ergenekon organization, which he has worked as a journalist to expose.

The co-author of Ahmet Şık's earlier books on Ergenekon, Ertuğrul Mavioğlu, made a summary of the book.

In the book, there are long passages on the life of Fethullah Gülen, already contained in many articles and books, but the book offers further details on the conflict between Necmettin Erbakan and the Nationalist Movement Party (MHP). The book also presents confessions of one of the founders of the Akyazılı Foundation that in 1966 became the basis for the establishment of the Gülen movement. The book also explains how Gülen developed schools and made use of certain media institutions.

Relating to the government of the ruling Justice and Development Party (AKP), the book details the installment of members of the Gülen community into the Turkish bureaucracy. The question is asked whether the community includes most members of the armed unit of the police. The Democratic Turkey Forum has translated some passages of the book into English.

In his draft book, Şık draws heavily on other sources, including quoting extensively from intelligence reports from before the AKP came to power in 2002 and more recent work by other journalists and analysts. Proponents of Gülen have said that "the book aims to create a sensation, rather than provide objective information".

A new section analyzing the 2016 Turkish coup d'état attempt was added to the newer versions of the book. In this section Şık talks about lack of unity inside the military and concludes the coup d'état attempt as two reactionary forces fighting for control.

== See also ==
- Conservatism in Turkey
- Conspiracy theories in Turkey
- Freedom of religion in Turkey
