= Victoria Amelina =

Ukrainian writer (1986–2023)

- Вікторія Амеліна
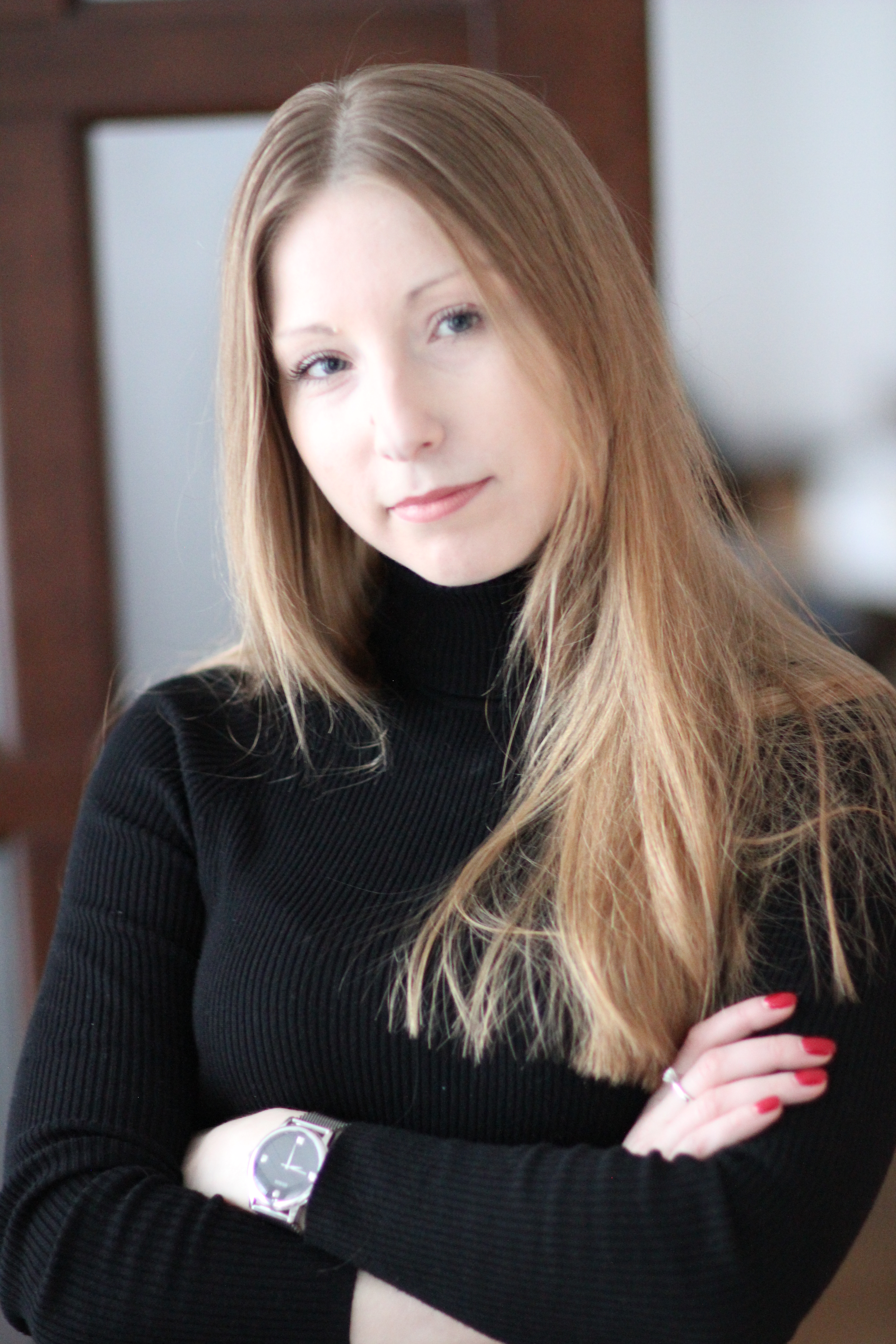
- Amelina in 2015
- Born: Viktoriia Yuriivna Amelina; 1 January 1986; Lviv, Ukrainian SSR, Soviet Union
- Died: 1 July 2023 (aged 37); Dnipro, Ukraine
- Occupations: Novelist; essayist
- Writing career
- Notable works: Fall Syndrome (2014); Dom's Dream Kingdom (2017)
- Notable awards: Order of Merit; Joseph Conrad Literary Award; European Union Prize for Literature short-list
- Movement: Member of PEN International

Viktoriia Amelina (née Shalamay; Ukrainian: Вікторія Юріївна Амеліна; 1 January 1986 – 1 July 2023), was a Ukrainian novelist and war crimes researcher. She was the author of two novels and a children's book, a winner of the Joseph Conrad Literary Award and a European Union Prize for Literature finalist.

== Early life and education ==
Victoria Amelina was born in Lviv. She emigrated to Canada with her father at the age of fourteen, but returned to Ukraine soon after. After completing a degree in computer science in Lviv, Amelina started her career in IT before becoming a full-time writer and poet in 2015.

== Writing ==
Since her debut novel Синдром листопаду, або Homo Compatiens (The Fall Syndrome, or Homo Compatiens) was published in 2015, Amelina focused on writing. The Fall Syndrome, or Homo Compatiens (foreword by Yurii Izdryk) deals with the events at Maidan in 2014. The novel received several literary awards, and was welcomed by both Ukrainian and foreign critics and scholars.

In 2016, Amelina published a book for children called Хтось, або Водяне серце (Somebody, or Water Heart).

In 2017, Victoria Amelina published a novel, Дім для Дома (Dom's Dream Kingdom), about the family of a Soviet colonel who lived in Lviv in the 1990s in the former childhood apartment of the Polish Jewish author Stanisław Lem. The novel was short-listed for the LitAkcent literary award in 2017 and for the European Union Prize for Literature in 2019. In 2023, Amelina was offered a UK publishing deal for the book.

Amelina was a member of PEN International. In 2018, she took part in 84th World PEN Congress in India as a delegate from Ukraine and gave a speech about Ukrainian filmmaker and a political prisoner in Russia Oleg Sentsov. In 2021 she received the Joseph Conrad Korzeniowski Literary Prize. That same year, Amelina founded a literature festival in the Donetsk region.

In 2022, she started writing poetry as well. She explained her motivations for this, saying "That's what war leaves you. The sentences are as short as possible, the punctuation a redundant luxury, the plot unclear, but every word carries so much meaning. All this applies to poetry as well as to war". Her prose and poems have been translated into several languages.

In June 2023, Amelina was awarded a year-long residency in Paris for displaced Ukrainian writers. She planned to use the residency to finish her most recent book, Looking at Women Looking at War, described as "a diary of about a dozen women, including [herself], pursuing justice". She was killed before her residency started. According to her editors, the book was "nearly 60 percent" complete when she died. It was published by St. Martin's Press in 2025. To fill in the gaps, her editors decided to insert Amelina's notes and observations in-between passages. Looking at Women Looking at War, her only non-fiction book, was awarded the Orwell Prize for Political Writing in June 2025.

== Wartime work ==
After the Russian invasion of Ukraine started, she worked as a war crimes researcher for Truth Hounds, a Ukrainian organization. She used her training as a novelist to interview witnesses.

In September 2022, while doing research in the Izium region, she uncovered the war diary of fellow Ukrainian writer Volodymyr Vakulenko, who had been killed by the occupying forces in March 2022. In May 2023, Vakulenko received a posthumous award from the International Publishers Association, which Amelina accepted on his behalf.

Amelina also hosted internally displaced Ukrainians and helped to deliver humanitarian aid in Lviv.

== Personal life and death ==
Amelina had a son in the early 2010s.

As of 2022, Amelina lived in Kyiv. In June 2023, after receiving a residency in Paris, Amelina considered moving there with her 12-year-old son.

On 27 June 2023, she was injured during the Russian attack on Kramatorsk while she was dining at RIA Pizza together with Héctor Abad, Sergio Jaramillo and Catalina Gómez. The restaurant was hit by an Iskander missile. Amelina died due to her injuries on 1 July at the Mechnikov Hospital in Dnipro at the age of 37. She was buried in Lviv.

In 2023, a tribute to Amelina, Nothing Bad Has Ever Happened, was published by Arrowsmith Press. It included international contributions and previously published work by Amelina in English translation.

After a school-wide consultation, Amelina was selected to be the promotion patron for the 2025/2026 academic year of the College of Europe.

== Awards ==
- Order of Merit, 3rd class (22 January 2024, posthumously)

== Bibliography ==
- «Синдром листопаду, або Homo Compatiens, The Fall Syndrome or Homo Compatiens» (Discursus, 2014) ISBN 9786177236091
- «Синдром листопаду, або Homo Compatiens, The Fall Syndrome or Homo Compatiens» (Віват, 2015) ISBN 9786176901716
- «Хтось, Або Водяне Серце, Somebody or Waterheart» (Видавництво Старого Лева, 2016) ISBN 9788771270372
- «Дім для Дома, Dom's Dream Kingdom» (Видавництво Старого Лева, 2017) ISBN 9786176794165
- «Е-е-есторії екскаватора Еки, Stories of Eka the Excavator» [Архівовано 28 липня 2021 у Wayback Machine.] (Львів: Видавництво Старого Лева, 2021) ISBN 978-617-679-924-5.
- «Looking At Women, Looking At War» — posthumorous publication of an unfinished novel (St. Martin's Press, 2025) ISBN 978-1-250-36768-6

=== Anthologies ===
- «Це зробила вона, She Did It» (Видавництво «Видавництво», 2017)
- «Лялька, Doll» (Видавництво Старого Лева, 2018)
- «Мости замість стін, Bridges Instead of Walls» (Видавництво Старого Лева, 2020)
- «Що дасть нам силу?, What Gives Us Strength» (Дух і літера, 2020)
- «Ковчег „Титанік". 20 есеїв про людство зразка 2020–го, The Arc Called Titanic. 20 Essays on Humanity of 2020» (онлайн-антологія 27 Bookforum, 2020)
