= Vakulenko =

Vakulenko (Ukrainian: Вакуленко) is a Ukrainian surname. Notable people with the surname include:

- Julia Vakulenko (born 1983), Ukraine-born tennis player
- Oleksiy Vakulenko (1981–2007), Ukrainian Greco-Roman wrestler
- Serhiy Vakulenko (born 1993), Ukrainian footballer
- Vasiliy Vakulenko (Basta) (born 1980), Russian rapper, producer and radio host
- Volodymyr Vakulenko (1972–2022), Ukrainian children's writer and poet
