= Vatansever Kuvvetler Güç Birliği Hareketi =

Turkish nationalist organization

Vatansever Kuvvetler Güç Birliği Hareketi (VKGB, variously translated as Union of Patriotic Forces, Association for the Union of Patriotic Forces, Power Union of Patriotic Forces etc.) was a Turkish ultranationalist group, various members of which are charged in the Ergenekon trials, after the VKGB trial was merged with the Ergenekon trials in 2009. VKGB was headed by Taner Ünal. At the time of the arrest of the VKGB leadership in mid-2007, it was estimated to have 2-3000 members. It had been founded in April 2005 by former Grey Wolves as part of a new form of ultranationalism labelled "ulusalcılık" with a greater emphasis on anti-imperialism and more open to alliances with the left. In 2006 Semih Tufan Gulaltay said he was considering merging his National Unity Party with the VKGB. At some point the VKGB developed links with another ultranationalist group, the Kuvayı Milliye Derneği.

Members include Muzaffer Tekin Alparslan Arslan and Fikri Karadağ.

Prosecutors charged members of the group with rigging military procurement tenders, and that the group carried out military training with a view to carrying out terrorist attacks. Links with the assassination of Hrant Dink have also been evidenced.
