= Ergenekon trials =

2008–2016 Turkish legal affair

The Ergenekon trials or the Ergenekon conspiracy, were a series of high-profile trials which took place in 2008–2016 in Turkey in which 275 people, including military officers, journalists and opposition lawmakers, all alleged members of Ergenekon, a suspected secularist clandestine organization, were accused of plotting against the Turkish government. The trials resulted in lengthy prison sentences for the majority of the accused. Those sentences were overturned shortly after.

Since Istanbul Heavy Penal Court 13 (tr: 13. İstanbul Ağır Ceza Mahkemesi) accepted the 2,455-page indictment against 86 defendants in the first case against alleged members of the supposed clandestine organization Ergenekon on 28 July 2008 a further 14 indictments were submitted up until February 2011. Until the fourth indictment the number of defendants had increased to 531 and more than 8,000 pages of indictments had been written. Most trials were held in Silivri Prison. At the beginning the courtroom could accommodate about 280 people. In June 2009, the prison's sport hall was converted for the term of the trial into a maxi courtroom with a capacity for 753 people.

In April 2016, the Supreme Court of Appeals overturned the lower court's convictions because prosecutors had been unable to prove that Ergenekon actually existed and whatever evidence presented had been collected illegally.

== The first indictment ==
The first hearing at Istanbul Heavy Penal Court 13 was held on 20 October 2008. The main charges were: establishing, directing, and being a member of an armed terrorist organization; aiding and abetting a terrorist organization; attempting to overthrow the government through the use of force and coercion; acquiring, stocking, and using explosives; and urging others to commit crimes using explosives.

The reading of the 2,455-page indictment lasted until 13 November 2008. In the 26th hearing on 15 December 2008 defendant one, retired General Veli Küçük spoke for the first time and pleaded not guilty. In January and February 2009 four defendants were released including retired General Hurşit Tolon. One defendant, lawyer Kemal Kerinçsiz testified from hearing 66 to hearing 78 on 20 April 2009.

On 30 January 2010 the defendants Dr. Emin Gürses, Dr. Ümit Sayın and Muhammet Yüce were released on pending trial. The hearing was adjourned to 22 February 2010. During the hearing of 7 December 2009 Dr. Ümit Sayın had said that he was a "secret witness" by the code name of "Anadolu". Subsequently, his lawyer declined to defend him any further. During the hearing of 2 December 2010 (hearing 165) the defendant Alparslan Arslan, charged for the 2006 Turkish Council of State shooting, demanded to benefit from the law of repentance. Despite repeated demands of the presiding judge he did not reveal any details.

On 9 December 2010 prime defendant, retired General Veli Küçük took the floor to complain that allegedly a diagram existed showing people in the organization above and below him. He claimed that persons such as former Chief of Staff Hüseyin Kıvrıkoğlu, former Prime Minister Tansu Çiller and Mehmet Ağar were among his "superiors". He asked that they be heard as witnesses.

=== Court cases merged with the first indictment ===
The cases merged with the first case against Ergenekon include:

- a case called "Power Union of Patriotic Forces" (tr: Vatansever Kuvvetler Güç Birliği). This trial is related to an operation called "Vortex" conducted on 8 July 2007. There are 14 defendants in this trial. The case was merged with the Ergenekon trial on 28 August 2009.
- the 2006 attack on the Council of State and the bomb attack on the daily Cumhuriyet, This cases (one of them conducted in Ankara) had been merged earlier. Nine defendants are on trial here.
- Molotov cocktail attack on Cumhuriyet in 2008. Here eight defendants, six of them in pre-trial detention are charged.
- a case related to supply arms for the main defendant in the trial on the attack against judges at the Council of State, Alparslan Arslan has two defendants.

In May 2011 a trial of a man accused of plotting to assassinate Greek Patriarch Bartholomew was merged with the first Ergenekon case. The case was taken from Istanbul Heavy Penal Court 9 and will continue at Istanbul Heavy Penal Court 13. The man accused in the assassination plot, Ismet Rençber, is facing a prison sentence of between 7.5 and 15 years on charges of "being a member of armed organization".

As of early 2011 there were 119 defendants overall charged in the first case against Ergenekon.

== The second indictment ==
With the 1,909-page second indictment another 56 defendants were charged at Istanbul Heavy Penal Court 13. The main defendant was General Şener Eruygur. This case was later merged with a case against 52 defendants named in an indictment of 1,454 pages. The main charges include plotting a coup by forming a terrorist organization, plotting to restructure the civil administration and planning to wiretap illegally. The defendants include Ali Balkız, Mehmet Haberal. Tuncay Özkan and journalist Mustafa Balbay. The trial of Yusuf Erikel was merged with this trial on 4 February 2011. There are eight defendants including the lawyer Yusuf Erikel. The indictment has 150 pages

The first hearing was held on 20 July 2009. The court merged the cases of indictments 2 and 3. Of the 52 defendants from indictment 3 37 were in pre-trial detention. In June 2010 defendant retired General Levent Ersöz read out his 350-page testimony via a video conference from the hospital of the medical faculty Cerrahpaşa. He pleaded not guilty.

== The Poyrazköy case ==
Poyrazköy is the name of a village (village Poyraz, tr: Poyrazköy) in Beykoz district, Istanbul Province. It has become the name of one of several trials against alleged members of the clandestine organization Ergenekon, allegedly planning to overthrow the government of the Justice and Development Party. Three court cases (indictments) were merged to form the "Poyrazköy case": a) the planned assassination of admirals, b) the cage action plan and c) the initial Poyrazköy trial. All three cases were initiated after the discovery in Poyrazköy of illegal arms. A coup plan, referred to as the 'cage plan', dated March 2009, was seized by investigators from Ergenekon suspects. The 'cage plan' allegedly aimed at destabilising the country by killing members of non-Muslim minorities.

=== The indictments ===
In January 2010 Istanbul Heavy Penal Court 12 accepted the indictment against 17 people who are accused of storing munitions in Poyrazköy. The indictment consists of 300 pages and 24 additional files. The first hearing was scheduled for 9 April 2010. The defendants were Tayfun Duman, Ergin Geldikaya, Levent Bektaş, Mustafa Turhan Ecevit, Ercan Kireçtepe, Eren Günay, Erme Onat, İbrahim Koray Özyurt, Şafak Yürekli, Muharrem Nuri Alacalı, Levent Görgeç, Mert Yanık, Dora Sungunay, Halil Cura, Sadettin Doğan, Ferudun Arslan and Ali Türkşen. The charges relate to possession of arms without permission, membership in an armed organization and the attempt to overthrow the Grand National Assembly of Turkey.

In February the same court accepted an indictment on allegations that 19 Navy personnel planned to assassinate Navy admirals. The targeted admirals were named as current top Navy commander Admiral Metin Ataç and former top Navy commander Admiral Eşref Uğur Yiğit. The charges include being members of an armed terrorist organization, keeping explosive materials and bullets and illegally recording personal information. The assassination case's first trial was scheduled for 7 May 2010. The 166-page indictment listed as defendants: Faruk Akın, Sinan Efe Noyan, Alperen Erdoğan, Burak Düzalan, Yakut Aksoy, Tarık Ayabakan, Ülkü Öztürk, Ali Seyhur Güçlü, Sezgin Demirel, Fatih Göktaş, Burak Amaç, Burak Özkan, Yiğithan Göksu, Oğuz Dağnık, Koray Kemiksiz, Levent Çakın and Mehmet Orhan Yücel.

The trial of 33 serving and retired Turkish military officers opened on 16 June 2010, with a first hearing at the Istanbul Heavy Penal Court 12. The Armenian newspaper Agos, one of the targets identified in the alleged plan, was accepted as an intervenor. The 65-page indictment presented the imprisoned defendants Ahmet Feyyaz Öğütçü, Kadir Sağdıç and Mehmet Fatih İlgar as prime suspects in direct contact to the armed organization Ergenekon. The other defendants (not on pre-trial detention), Mücahit Erakyol, Deniz Erki, Tanju Veli Aydın, Emre Sezenler, Hüseyin Doğancı, İsmail Bak, Metin Samancı, Levent Gülmen, Aydın Ayhan Saraçoğlu, Bülent Aydın, Bora Coşkun, Süleyman Erharat, Murat Aslan, Emre Tepeli, İbrahim Öztürk, Halil Özsaraç, Gürol Yurdunal, Ümit Özbek, Bülent Karaoğlu, Daylan Muslu, Hüseyin Erol, Mehmet İnce, Alpay Belleyici, İsmail Zühtü Tümer, Levent Olcaner, Özgür Erken, Metin Fidan, Türker Doğanca, Mesut Adanur and Metin Keskin were accused of membership in an armed organization.

The conspiracy plan entitled Operation Cage Action Plan (Turkish: Kafes Operasyonu Eylem Planı) was found on a CD seized in the office of retired Major Levent Bektaş, who was arrested in April 2010. The document was published by Taraf newspaper in May 2010. An English translation of it exists. The plan allegedly calls for political terrorism and assassinations to be enacted against various groups of Eastern Orthodox, Armenians, Kurds, Jews and Alevis. The plan apparently originates from secret societies within the Turkish military.

=== Hearings ===
The European Union declared that it was closely following developments related to the Naval Forces Command plan.

On 9 April 2010 the first trial in the Porazköy case started. The judge at Istanbul Heavy Penal Court 12 rejected applications from defense lawyers that the case be transferred to a military court. The prosecution is seeking life sentences for five defendants, up to 39 years for another, and up to 15 years for the other 11.

In May 2010 the case relating to the arms found in Poyrazköy and the attempted assassination of two admirals were merged. The defendants Ülkü Öztürk, Ali Seyhur Güçlü and Sezgin Demirel were released.

During the first hearing on the so-called "cage action plan" on 15 June 2010 the court rejected the demand to transfer the case to a military court. The case has a total of 33 suspects who are being charged with membership in an armed terrorist organization and could face prison sentences of between 7.5 years and 15 years if found guilty.

In June 2010 the cases dealing with the "Cage" plan and the munitions found in Poyrazköy were merged.

On 5 July 2010 the final three suspects under arrest in connection to the "Kafes" (Cage) Plan were released pending trial.

On 11 April 2011 the 6th hearing was held in the Poyrazköy case that involves 69 defendants, seven of them in pre-trial detention. Defendant Faruk Akın stated that the admirals Metin Ataç and Uğur Yiğit (the potential victims of the planned assassination) had visited him in Hasdal Prison and expressed their sorrow on the case. At the end of the hearing defendant Levent Bektaş was released pending trial.

== Case 4: "Wet signature", Erzincan and the "Action Plan to Fight Reaction" ==
The name "wet signature" (tr: "Islak İmza") is known as indictment seven. Among the seven defendants are Bedrettin Dalan and Major Dursun Çiçek. The indictment has 165 pages. The nine-page document carrying the hand-written signature (wet signature) of Major Dursun Çiçek on each page was found in the office of lawyer Serdar Öztürk. It also is mentioned under the title "plan to intervene in democracy" (tr: Demokrasiye Müdahale Planı) . In a letter to Prime Minister Recep Tayyip Erdoğan lawyer Öztürk alleged that the signatures had been faked by using technical methods.

The trial of people from Erzincan involves 23 defendants including General Saldıray Berk, once commander of the 3rd Army and Erzincan Chief Prosecutor İlhan Cihaner. The indictment consists of 61 pages. The indictment for the Erzincan group was presented to Erzurum Heavy Penal Court 2 on 26 February 2010. Excluding the attachments of 6 pages the 55-page strong indictment presents statements of 12 secret witnesses on 20 pages of it. The defendants allegedly tried to put the "action plan against fundamentalism" (tr: İrtica ile Mücadele Eylem Planı) into effect.

This plan found in an office of a lawyer pretended that reactionary (fundamentalist) groups accused members of the Turkish Armed Forces to belong to Ergenekon and, therefore, had to be presented as criminal elements. The investigations had started after hand grenades and munition had been found close to Erzincan. Afterwards the defendants had tried to "hire" witnesses to testify that the police had placed the arms there. They had tried to find people to place arms in the home of a religious officer and a school of the Gülen movement. Chief prosecutor İlhan Cihaner had threatened to kill the father of the person, if he did not as demanded.

The first hearing at Erzurum Heavy Penal Court 2 was held on 4 May 2010. At the time 10 of the 16 defendants were in pre-trial detention. Since another case against prosecutor Cihaner was pending at the Court of Cassation for misuse of authority the files were sent there to decide which court should hear the case. On 18 May 2010 Penal Chamber 11 at the Court of Cassation heard the case and decided to release all 10 defendants. Since Istanbul Heavy Penal Court 13 also had demanded to take over the case the Assembly of Chamber at the Court of Cassation had to deal with the case. On 24 December 2010, the Assembly decided that the case related to misuse of authority should continue at Penal Chamber 11 at the Court of Cassation, but the Erzincan file should be sent back to the prosecutor in Erzurum, because he had initiated a case against a first-degree prosecutor without permission of the Ministry of Justice.

On 23 and 24 May 2011, Istanbul Heavy Penal Court 13 heard the testimony of a secret witness code-named "Efe" in the trial entitled "Wet Signature". The witness told the judges that high-profile but illegal meetings were held in Erzincan during which members of the military, businessmen and members of political parties discussed ongoing developments in Turkey. "The meetings were chaired by Cihaner. Cihaner gave orders for acts (of violence) that sought to foment chaos in society," the witness claimed. Efe, however, did not specify when the meetings took place. The hearing was adjourned to 26 May 2011.

In August 2011 Istanbul Heavy Penal Court 13 accepted another 92-page indictment against 22 defendants in a case entitled "Internet Memorandum" (tr: "İnternet Andıcı"). The Court issued orders to apprehend 14 defendants including the generals Nusret Taşdeler and Hıfzı Çubuklu and combined the case with the trial on the "action plan for fighting fundamentalism". The first hearing was scheduled for 12 September.

In April 2012 the trial called "Action Plan to Fight Reaction" was merged with the second Ergenekon trial raising the number of defendants to 147, 33 of them in pre-trial detention.

=== The "Internet memorandum" ===
On 22 July 2011 the investigations into the so-called "Internet Memorandum" (tr: "İnternet Andıcı") resulted in an indictment of prosecutor Cihan Kansız that he sent to Istanbul Heavy Penal Court 13. He demanded to combine this case with the "action plan to fight reaction". The 19 defendants include 14 officers on active duty, four retired officers (including former Chief of the General Staff İlker Başbuğ and Commander of the First Army Hasan Iğsız) and a civil servant. They were charged with the attempt to overthrow the government. On 8 August 2011 Istanbul Heavy Penal Court issued arrest warrants against 14 defendants and decided to combine the "Internet Memorandum" case with the "action plan to fight reaction". The first hearing was scheduled for 12 September 2011.

On that day the 32nd hearing was held in the "action plan to fight reaction" case. The number of defendants in the "Internet Memorandum" case had risen to 22. A secret witness with a disguised voice sitting in a separate room was heard. The defence pointed at various discrepancies of the testimony to the initial statements of this witness. The defendant Colonel Ziya İlker Göktaş had appeared in court and was arrested.

== Case 5: ÇEV and ÇYDD ==
The case against board members of the Foundation for Contemporary Education (tr: Çağdaş Eğitim Vakfı, ÇEV) and the Association for the Support of Contemporary Living (tr: Çağdaş Yaşamı Destekleme Derneği ÇYDD) started on 18 March 2011. The 342-page strong indictment lists eight defendants. Among the defendants are the former chair of ÇEV, Gülseven Yaşer and Ayşe Yüksel from the university in Van and chair of the Van Association for Support of Contemporary Life (ÇYDD). According to the indictment the premises of ÇEV und ÇYDD in Istanbul were searched on 13 April 2009. Several people were detained and material (mainly CDs and hard disks) were confiscated. Documents found allegedly prove the intention of the defendants to recruit new member for Ergenekon to oppose fundamentalist students.

Chief defendant Gülseven Yaşer is accused to have forced students to participate in demonstration for Ergenekon and to have threatened to cancel their scholarship. The indictment alleges that 30 students supported by the foundation are members of terrorist organizations. Details on these 30 students can be found on pages 35 to 40 of the indictment. In the Turkish press the full names and the allegation that they set cars on fire can be found in many papers in Turkey. Such an allegation is made for three people. Two of them were charged with "acting in the name of an organization without being a member of it" and only one person was charged as offender and is imprisoned since 2006.

On 17 December 2010 ÇEV released a press statement on these allegations. The new chair of ÇEV, Prof. Dr. Ahmet Altınel stated that since 1994 the foundation had provided scholarships for more than 20,000 students. Istanbul State Security Court 3 had dealt with the allegation that the foundation supported members of illegal organizations. In 2003 the Court had acquitted them and in 2004 the Court of Cassation had confirmed the acquittal. Relating to the accusation in the press that the gendarmerie was in possession of a report on the subject the foundation had opened a case for compensation and on 16 March 2010 Ankara Civil Court of First Instance 17 had ruled in favour of the demand. The gendarmerie had informed the court that no such report (or knowledge) existed.

The fifth hearing at Istanbul Heavy Penal Court 12 was held on 11 April 2012. It turned out that the prosecutor's office had forgotten to send four files of evidence to the court. The defence asked for time to inspect the file and the prosecutor demanded that the case be combined with the Poyrazköy trial. The court decided to merge the cases. With the eight defendants in this cases the number of defendants in the Poyrazköy trial (case 3) has risen to 85 defendants, 11 of them in pre-trial detention. Earlier the Poyrazköy trial had been merged with the cases called "cage action plan", "assassination of admirals" (1 and 2) and the second Poyrazköy case.

== Case 6: Şile ==
At the beginning of March 2011 Istanbul Heavy Penal Court 12 accepted a 34-page indictment of prosecutor Cihan Kansız charging four defendants with membership of Ergenekon. The investigation related to the discovery of arms in August 2010. At places that the defendant Ulaş Özel had named arms such as a Kalashnikov rifle, several hand grenades and two Glock pistols had been found. According to the indictment Ulaş Özel had been a member of TİKKO, the armed wing of the Communist Party of Turkey/Marxist–Leninist. He had become a repentant and become active for JİTEM. The defendants allegedly were in contact to leading members of Ergenekon. The defendant Hüseyin Yanç reportedly was a member of Kongra-Gel, before he joined JİTEM. Defendant Okan İşgör is said to have been active for the radical Islamic organization İBDA-C.

On 20 July 2011 Istanbul Heavy Penal Court 12 held the first hearing in this case. Defendant Ulaş Özel stated that he had been active for the Command of JİTEM in Elazığ region after he became a repentant. For three to four months he had been taken from prison to operations and they had received money for each person they killed. During the operations he had participated in 35 members of TİKKO and 90 members of the PKK had been killed. Following the testimony of Ulaş Özel the court issued arrest warrants for Okan İşgör and repentant PKK militant Hüseyin Yanç. Suspended police officer Yusuf Ethem Akbulut is the only defendant not in pre-trial detention.

Okan İşgör stated that he had stayed in Metris Prison with members of İBDA-C for 18 months before 1999. Intelligence officers had visited him and he had provided a testimony of 400 pages. Repentant PKK member Hüseyin Yanç told the court that he had been visited by generals. One of them, Osman Eker was like a father to him.

== Case 7: OdaTV ==
At the beginning of September 2011 Istanbul Heavy Penal Court 16 accepted the 134-page indictment relating to 14 suspects, 12 of them in pre-trial detention. Most of the defendants are journalists, who were detained in February and March 2011. The charges concentrate on the Internet portal OdaTV, owned by Soner Yalçın. The indictment accuses the defendants to be either founders, leaders, members or supporters of the "armed terror organization Ergenekon", to have incited to hatred and enmity, to have obtained secret documents etc. Ahmet Şık and Nedim Şener, neither of whom worked for odatv, are charged with supporting Ergenekon Şık – because of his unpublished book The Imam's Army, a copy of which was allegedly found on odatv computers. The first hearing was scheduled for 22 November 2011 to be held at Istanbul Heavy Penal Court 16 at the Istanbul Justice Palace.

Digital documents linking to the Ergenekon conspiracy are the basis of the case against Barış Terkoğlu, Ahmet Şık, Nedim Şener and the other detainees in the OdaTV case. Examinations of the documents conducted by computer experts at Boğaziçi University, Yıldız Technical University, Middle East Technical University and the American data processing company DataDevastation have refuted the validity of the documents and concluded that outside sources targeted the journalists' computers. Rare and malicious computer viruses, including Autorun-BJ and Win32:Malware-gen, allowed the placement of the documents to go unnoticed by the defendants. Another judicial report prepared by the governmental agency Tübitak also confirmed the infection by malicious viruses but couldn't neither confirm nor reject any outside intervention. A second report rejected the journalists' claims on the basis that the documents had been created before the computers were infected. Yet another review of the OdaTV evidence by digital forensics company Arsenal Consulting revealed that local attacks, which required physical access, were responsible for delivery of the incriminating documents to Barış Pehlivan's OdaTV computer.

Others charged in the case include Yalçın Küçük and Hanefi Avcı and Muhammet Sait Cakir, Coskun Musluk and Müyesser Ugur. Also Mustafa Balbay and Tuncay Özkan.

== Cases for reporting on Ergenekon ==
There have been a number of trials arising from reporting on Ergenekon, with journalists accused of "violating the confidentiality of the investigation" into Ergenekon, or violating the judicial process of the Ergenekon trials (attempting to influence a trial). The European Commission said in 2010 that the number of cases was "a cause for concern."

Convictions for reporting include Şamil Tayyar, for his book Operasyon Ergenekon (20 months' imprisonment, suspended for five years); and Ahmet Can Karahasanoğlu, editor-in-chief of Vakit, sentenced to 30 months' imprisonment. Acquittals include the news coordinator of the daily Radikal, Ertuğrul Mavioğlu, and journalist Ahmet Şık, for a book entitled Kırk Katır, Kırk Satır.

== Verdicts ==
On 5 August 2013 verdicts were announced. General Veli Küçük, Capt. Muzaffer Tekin and Council of State shooter Alparslan Arslan received consecutive life sentences, while İlker Başbuğ, Tuncay Özkan, Dursun Çiçek, Kemal Kerinçsiz, Doğu Perinçek, Fuat Selvi, Hasan Ataman Yıldırım, Hurşit Tolon, Nusret Taşdeler, Hasan Iğsız and Şener Eruygur were sentenced to aggravated life imprisonment. Many others received lengthy sentences, including Arif Doğan (47 years), Fikret Emek (41 years) and Oktay Yıldırım (33 years). 21 of the 275 defendants were acquitted.

In April 2016, all the verdicts in the case were annulled, pending a re-trial.

== See also ==
- Human rights in Turkey
- Sledgehammer (coup plan)
- Sarıkız, Ayışığı, Yakamoz and Eldiven
