= Sumru Çörtoğlu =

Turkish judge (born 1943)

President of the Council of State
- In office 2 May 2006 – 13 May 2008
- Preceded by: Ender Çetinkaya
- Succeeded by: Mustafa Birden

Member of council
- In office 10 September 1992 – 13 May 2008

Personal details
- Born: May 13, 1943 (age 82) Tokat, Turkey

Sumru Çörtoğlu (born May 13, 1943) is a high-ranked Turkish judge. She served as the Chief Justice of the Turkish Council of State.

On May 3, 2006, Sumru Çörtoğlu, who was the Head of the 4th Department of the Council of State since February 12, 2001, was elected as the new Chief Justice after winning the 68th round of voting. She succeeded Enver Çetinkaya in this post.

She was born in Tokat. She is married and has two children.

== See also ==
- Legal System in the Republic of Turkey

Legal offices
| Preceded by Ender Çetinkaya | President of the Council of State of Turkey; 2006-2008 | Succeeded by Mustafa Birden |
