= Turkish Publishers Association =

The Turkish Publishers Association (Turkish: Türkiye Yayıncılar Birliği, TYB) is the oldest national association for publishers in Turkey. It was founded in 1985, and in 2013 counted around 300 publishing companies and distributors as members. It is a member of the International Publishers Association.

It awards the Freedom of Thought and Expression Prize annually since 1995; recipients include Meltem Arıkan (2004), Perihan Mağden (2008), Sel Publishing House (2009), Nedim Şener (2010), and İsmail Saymaz (2012).
