= Mustafa Birden =

Turkish lawyer

President of the Council of State
- In office 28 May 2008 – 1 June 2011
- Preceded by: Sumru Çörtoğlu
- Succeeded by: Hüseyin Hüsnü Karakullukçu

President of the 2. Council of State
- In office 7 March 2002 – 28 May 2008
- Preceded by: Sabri Coşkun
- Succeeded by: Kamuran Erbuğa

Personal details
- Born: 1 June 1946 (age 79) Kırıkkale, Turkey

Mustafa Birden (born 1 June 1946, Kırıkkale) is a Turkish lawyer who served as the President of the Council of State between 28 May 2008 and 1 June 2011.

== Biography ==
Mustafa Birden, who was the target of the Council of State Attack during the Council of State Second League Presidency which he conducted before this duty, was injured in the attack. Born in Kırıkkale in 1946, Mustafa Birden graduated from Kirikkale High School as a secondary school. He then graduated from Ankara University Faculty of Law Birden, in 1968. He was a Deputy Chief of the State Council in 1971, while serving as Deputy Chief of Staff of the Machinery and Chemical Industries Association. Birden, who presided at the Administrative Courts of Istanbul and Ankara, was elected to the Council of State in 1994. Birden, who served as the Principal Member of the Dispute Court, was elected to the Presidency of the 2nd Council of State in 2002.

In the Vakit Newspaper of the Council of State in Anatolia, he published the pictures of other members, especially Mustafa Birden, by taking the headline "Those members are here". According to the target, after this incident, lawyer Alparslan Arslan attacked the 2nd Council of the State Council on 17 May 2006. Alparslan Arslan, Mustafa Birden'de president of the meeting room before he headed. Mustafa Birden, "Friends, all of you go under the table!" Yell. Then the aggressor fired his gun and the first bullet of Alparslan Arslan, who was attacking, entered under Mustafa Birden's heart. Attacker The first member of the Council of State, Mustafa Yücel Özbilgin, lost his life on duty. The heavily injured State Councilor, Mustafa Birden, was treated and improved. Mustafa Birden was elected President of the Council of State with a vote of 50 votes in the elections held on 28 May 2008 two years after the attack on the Council of State and retired on 1 June 2011.

Legal offices
| Preceded by Sumru Çörtoğlu | President of the Council of State of Turkey; 2008–2011 | Succeeded by Hüseyin Hüsnü Karakullukçu |
