= Yeni Akit =

Turkish daily newspaper

- Type: Daily newspaper
- Founded: 1993–1995 (as Beklenen Vakit); 1995–2001 (as Akit); 2001–2010 (as Anadolu’da Vakit); 2010–present (as Yeni Akit)
- Political alignment: Islamism; Pan-Islamism; Islamic fundamentalism Reactionism; Social conservatism Erdoğanism; Antisemitism; Anti-Zionism; Anti-communism; Anti-feminism; Anti-LGBT rights
- Language: Turkish
- Headquarters: Istanbul, Turkey
- Circulation: 55,681 (May 2018)
- Website: www.yeniakit.com.tr

Yeni Akit (literally "New Agreement") is daily newspaper published in Turkey, known for its Islamic fundamentalism. The newspaper was first published in 1993 under the name Vakit, before finally changing its name to Yeni Akit in 2010. Historically, Yeni Akit is known as a media that has political views that support Islamism and conservative views on various social and political issues in Turkey.

== History ==
The newspaper was founded in 2010 as a successor to Anadolu'da Vakit (2001–2010), but later took on the name Vakit. The original Vakit had been sued for defamation by 312 generals for a 2003 editorial written by columnist Asım Yenihaber which criticized the military. Vakit lost the case, and was ordered to pay 1.8 million Turkish liras in 2010. Columnist Abdurrahman Dilipak had his house forcibly sold in 2009 to pay damages relating to a 2000 article. In 2015, Akit TV, which claims to be the newspaper's broadcasting organ in the television sector, was established.

== Controversies ==
Yeni Akit is an Islamist newspaper in Turkey that has been involved in various controversies, especially regarding its coverage of social and minority issues. The newspaper has a readership that supports Islamic extremism and social conservatism, which is reflected in its coverage of minority communities such as non-Muslim religious groups, Kurds, and the LGBTQ+ community. Some have argued that Yeni Akit often uses harsh language and strong points of view in reporting on these issues, giving rise to the perception that the media is discrediting or even inciting tensions against minorities. Criticism of Yeni Akit has come from human rights groups and international organizations who worry that the rhetoric in its coverage could damage social harmony. However, its supporters see the newspaper as a media outlet that represents conservative religious and moral perspectives in Turkey, and argue that Yeni Akit is simply exercising press freedom to express their views that may not be represented by other mainstream media. With strong views on both sides, the controversy surrounding Yeni Akit reflects Turkey's complex socio-political dynamics, where conservative and secular values often clash in public discourse.

=== Role in Turkish Council of State shooting ===
Vakit had been charged with encouraging the 2006 Turkish Council of State shooting of a judge, which was notionally a protest against a decision blocking the appointment of a teacher wearing a headscarf as principal of a nursery school. Several months earlier, Vakit had produced a front-page headline, ‘Here are those members’, accompanied by the photographs and identities of the chief judge and three members of the 2nd Chamber of the Turkish Council of State responsible for the decision.

=== Hate speech ===
Yeni Akit is a Turkish newspaper that has long been known for its conservative views, particularly regarding religious and cultural values that are considered important to conservative circles in Turkey. As a newspaper with a conservative approach, Yeni Akit often reviews topics such as the role of the family, public morality, and social policies that are in accordance with religious and traditional values. However, in its efforts to uphold these values, some of its coverage can indirectly create negative impressions of minority groups, such as the LGBT community, women fighting for their rights, and minority ethnic groups.

Yeni Akit often displays hate speech towards various groups, such as the Jewish, Armenian, Greek, Yazidi communities, as well as individuals or groups considered to deviate from the Islamist ideology they adhere to, including Gülenists, Alevis, atheists, and also the LGBT community. In addition, this newspaper often engages in hate speech against secularists, freemasons, and various other socio-political currents, such as socialism, communism, pan-Turkism, Kemalism, and groups such as the Grey Wolves and feminists.

=== Antisemitism ===
In May 2014, Yeni Akit sought to blame Jews in the country's recent Soma coal mine disaster that left over 300 dead. The newspaper criticized the mine's owner for having a Jewish son-in-law and "Zionist-dominated media" for distorting the story.

In September 2014, Yeni Akit columnist Faruk Cose called for Turkish Jews to be taxed to pay for reconstructing buildings damaged in Gaza during Israel's Operation Protective Edge.

In July 2014, the newspaper used a picture of Adolf Hitler as the centerpiece for its daily word game, and the phrase "Seni arıyoruz" translating to ''We long for you'' as the answer to the puzzle.

=== Anti-LGBT ===
In January 2012, Yeni Akit was fined by the Turkish High Court of Appeals over comments published in 2008 describing gay people as "perverts."

In the aftermath of the 2016 Orlando nightclub shooting the newspaper published a headline calling the victims "deviants" or "perverted", which in turn was criticized by foreign media outlets.

=== Anti-Atatürk ===
On Atatürk's 75th death anniversary, on Yeni Akit's newspaper had a full page ad, that had the phrase ''Olmasaydı da olurduk'' translating to ''We would still be here if he didn't exist'' referring to Atatürk.

In January 2015, the newspaper posted a photo on their Facebook of Atatürk with a make-up filter and a darped up filter applied to it. Against this members of the MHP (Nationalist Movement Party of Turkey) protested in front of the Yeni Akit Headquarters. It is alleged that Yeni Akit employees fired bullets at the protesters.

=== Censoring of women ===
The newspaper censors images of women in both their print and online edition by blurring all uncovered skin. In some cases, women in the image are completely blurred out.

=== Targeting of journalists ===
In July 2012, over 200 prominent people signed a criminal complaint against Yeni Akit over its attacks on liberal Islamic journalist Ali Bayramoğlu.

In August 2012, the newspaper accused Cengiz Çandar and Hasan Cemal of supporting the PKK.

In December 2012, Yeni Akit published a list of 60 journalists who, it claimed, supported the PKK, and called the journalists "terrorists and criminals".

=== Support of bin Laden ===
Following his death in May 2011, Yeni Akit published a full page condolence in honor of Osama bin Laden.

=== Denial of Sivas massacre ===
Yeni Akit published a front-page story on 23 July 2012 declaring the Sivas massacre a "19 Year Lie", claiming the victims had been killed by gunshots rather than fire on the basis of morgue photos it claimed were previously unpublished. The claims were rapidly disproven, and strongly condemned by many.

=== Conviction of columnist for sexually abusing a minor ===
In September 2009's Bursa 4. Aggravated Felony Court's final hearing found Vakit newspaper columnist 78-year-old Hüseyin Üzmez convicted for sexually abusing a minor and was sentenced to 13 years 1 month 15 days in prison. Against the appeal, Penal Department No. 9 of the Supreme Court held another trial on 14 November 2012 where he was sentenced with the same time in prison. In 2012, Hüseyin Üzmez entered prison again, and in 2014 he was discharged from prison due to health problems and psychological problems. He died 12 days later. The newspaper denied the allegations and insisted this was a conspiracy.

=== Disinformation during Gezi Protests ===
During the Gezi Park protests in Turkey, Yeni Akit published many disinformative articles.

On 5 June Mustafa Durdu, a columnist at the newspaper, claimed that protestors may even have performed group sex inside Dolmabahçe Mosque.

On 13 June, Yeni Akit claimed that prostitution and group sex was common at Gezi park after 2 am. They based this claim on an "anonymous journalist who saw this happening with his own eyes and told it to someone else".

On 15 June, the newspaper accused supermarket chain Migros of delivering free supplies to the protestors at Gezi park. However, goods delivered to the park were bought by protestors through the supermarket's online store.

On 24 August, Yeni Akit claimed that Gezi protestors were preparing for a "big provocation" during the August 30 Victory Day celebrations.

=== Orlando nightclub shooting ===
Following the Orlando nightclub shooting, the newspaper published a headline calling the victims "deviant" or "perverted," which in turn was criticized by foreign media outlets.

=== 2017 Dutch–Turkish diplomatic incident ===
During the 2017 Dutch–Turkish diplomatic incident, Yeni Akit wrote a suggestive article which noted that while there were "400,000 Turks living in the Netherlands," the Royal Netherlands Army "has 48,000 soldiers."

=== Support for Taliban ===
Before the fall of Kabul to the Taliban forces in 2021, a columnist for the newspaper claimed that Afghanistan would "rise from its ashes" with Taliban.

== Columnists ==
- Abdullah Büyük
- Ali İhsan Karahasanoğlu
- Asım Yenihaber
- Hasan Aksay
- Hasan Karakaya
- Kenan Alpay
- Merve Kavakçı
- Şevki Yılmaz
- Yavuz Bahadıroğlu
- Abdullah Şanlıdağ
- Abdullah Yıldız
- Ahmet Gülümseyen
- Ersoy Dede
- Kıvanç Tığlı
- Latif Erdoğan
- Mehmet Ali Tekin
- Mehmet Doğan
- Mehmet Emin Gerger
- Mehmet Koçak
- Mehtap Yılmaz
- Mesut Bıyık
- Muhsin Meriç
- Mustafa Çelik
- Mustafa Özcan
- Nusret Çiçek
- Osman Atalay
- Prof. Dr. Namık Açıkgöz
- Serdar Demirel
- Yaşar Değirmenci
- Yener Dönmez
- Merve Kavakçı
