= İsmail Saymaz =

Turkish journalist (born 1980)

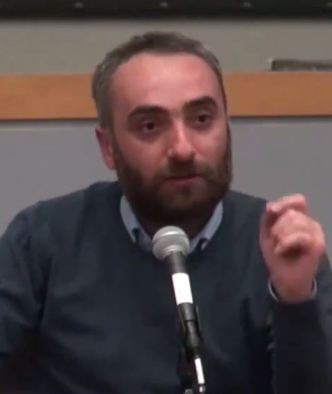
- Born: 11 July 1980 (age 46); Rize, Turkey
- Education: Marmara University
- Occupations: Journalist, writer
- Years active: 2002–present
- Employer(s): Radikal (2002-2016); Hürriyet (?-2020); Sözcü (2020-2021; 2023-present); Halk TV (2021-2023)
- Spouse: Şeyda Sayar Saymaz (m. 2020)
- Children: 1
- Awards: Metin Göktepe Journalism Award; Ayşe Zarakolu Freedom of Thought Prize

İsmail Saymaz (born 11 July 1980, in Rize) is a Turkish investigative journalist and writer for the newspaper Sözcü. He has published articles and books on the Turkish deep state and Ergenekon, including a 2011 book on links between the 2007 Zirve Publishing House massacre and the 2006 killing of Andrea Santoro, and another 2011 book on former police chief Hanefi Avcı. He has won a number of awards for his work.

== Career ==
At the age of 15, Saymaz hosted literature programs on local radios. Later, he participated in discussion programs on local television channels. He first started his journalism career in Rize. He then worked for local newspapers in cities such as İstanbul and Konya. Saymaz began working at Radikal in 2002, working there until its shut down on 25 March 2016.

Saymaz has reported and published books on issues such as human rights violations and freedom. He was prosecuted in nearly twenty cases with a prison sentence of more than a hundred years for various news reports, main one being the Erzincan case. He uncovered the footage of the beating of Ali İsmail Korkmaz, who lost his life during the Gezi Park protests, and shared it with the public. In 2014, he was included in the list of "100 Press Heroes" of the year by Reporters Without Borders. On October 24, 2016, while he was a reporter for Hürriyet newspaper, he conducted an interview with David Keynes, who holds the patent of ByLock, the communication application used by FETÖ/PDY members. After this interview, an investigation was opened against the newspaper and Saymaz was interrogated. In addition, this interview was considered as "evidence" in FETÖ/PDY investigations. Saymaz was awarded by the Turkish Journalists' Association for this interview.

İsmail Saymaz
(@ismailsaymaz)
tweeted:

As of today, I have parted ways with Halk TV. I would like to thank the Halk TV workers and our dear viewers, with whom I have worked shoulder to shoulder for nearly 20 months. Please forgive me if I have wronged you

10 April 2023

On 17 March 2020, Saymaz announced that he quit his job at Hürriyet. On May 1, 2020, he announced that he left Best FM, where he hosted the program Bunu Ben de Söylerim. In May 2020, he joined Halk TV and began appearing on the channel with the program Neyse O. In September 2020, he signed an agreement with Sözcü and started working as a reporter and commentator for the newspaper. In August 2021, he left Sözcü and moved to Halk TV. On April 10, 2023, he left Halk TV and returned to Sözcü.

=== Political views ===
Saymaz's political and social views have changed throughout his career; while his high school years were dominated by mostly nationalist and patriotic ideologies, his views drastically changed during his university life, in which he adopted a leftist mindset in which he criticized Kemalism. While working at Radikal, Saymaz became famous for his Ergenekon news, increasing his fame by the following years, Saymaz came to popularity once again especially during the 15 July process with his criticism of the trials and his leave of his former leftist identity for more republican, Kemalist and anti-immigrant views.

He criticized Turkish immigration measures, stating that the country's borders had turned into a roadblock due to the Syria policy and that some immigrants had become suicide bombers. After accusing his colleagues of being pro-Western and not feeling any sense of belonging to their people, he was accused of being a member of pro-AKP policy think-tank SETA.

Saymaz was taken into custody on 19 March 2025 as part of the investigation into the Gezi Park protests conducted by the Istanbul Chief Public Prosecutor's Office. He was subsequently released under house arrest.

== Personal life ==
Saymaz, whose family is originally from Pazaryolu, Erzurum, was born in Rize on July 11, 1980. He completed his primary and high school education in Rize. His family made a living by farming in İspir in the summer and fishing in Rize in the winter. During his high school years, he adopted an idealist mindset and then became interested in the leftist movement with the books recommended by his literature teacher. He graduated from Marmara University Faculty of Communication.

Saymaz married Şeyda Sayar on 16 August 2020. The couple have one child named Boran.

== Books ==
- Postmodern Cihat ("Postmodern Jihad"), Kalkedon Yayıncılık, 2010.
- Nefret - Malatya: Bir Milli Mutabakat Cinayeti ("Hate - Malatya: A Murder of National Consensus"), Kalkedon Yayıncılık, 2011.
- Hanefi Yoldaş: Gizli Örgüt Nasıl Çökertilir?, Kalkedon Yayıncılık, 2011.
- Oğlumu Öldürdünüz Arz Ederim - 12 Eylül'ün Beş Öyküsü: İnciraltı Katliamı, Cemil Kırbayır, Cengiz Aksakal, Nurettin Yedigöl, Maraş'ta Dört Yürek, Postacı Yayınevi, 2012
- Sıfır Tolerans: Polisin Eline Düşünce, İletişim Yayınları, 2012.
- Sözde Terörist (İletişim Yayınları, 2013)
- Esas Duruşta Cinayet (İletişim Yayınları, 2014)
- Ali İsmail-Emri Kim Verdi? (İletişim Yayınları, 2015)
- Fıtrat - İş Kazası Değil, Cinayet (İletişim Yayınları, 2016)
- Çay Güzeli (İletişim Yayınları, 2017)
- Türkiye'de IŞİD (İletişim Yayınları, 2017) ISBN 978-975-05-2275-8
- Kimsesizler Cumhuriyeti, (İletişim Yayınları, 2018) ISBN 978-975-05-2818-7
- Şehvetiye Tarikatı (İletişim Yayınları, Ağustos 2019) ISBN 978-975-05-2819-4
- Balkon Sefası (İletişim Yayınları, Haziran 2020) ISBN 978-975-05-2910-8
- Tosun Bank (İletişim Yayınları, Kasım 2020) ISBN 978-975-05-3003-6

== Awards ==
- Metin Göktepe Gazetecilik Ödülü (Metin Göktepe Journalism Award) (2010)
- Freedom of Press Award of the Turkish Journalists' Association (2010)
- Ayşe Zarakolu Freedom of Thought Prize (2011)
- Turkish Publishers Association's Freedom of Thought and Expression Prize (2012)
- ÇGD Bursa Branch Honorary Award (2013)
- Halkevleri "Rights of the People" Press Award (2013)
- Chamber of Electrical Engineers “Hasan Balıkçı” Honorary Award (2014)
- Abdi İpekçi Journalism of the Year Award (2014)
- Peoples' Democratic Congress Labor Assembly Award (2015)
- 56. Turkish Journalists' Association Turkey Journalism Achievement Award Political Branch (2015)
- Necip Hablemitoğlu Social Awareness Award (2016)
- Turkish Journalists' Association Award (2017)
