= Necip Hablemitoğlu =

Turkish historian

Dr. Necip Hablemitoğlu
- Born: 28 November 1954; Ankara, Turkey
- Died: 18 December 2002 (aged 48); Ankara, Turkey
- Cause of death: Assassinated
- Resting place: Karşıyaka Cemetery
- Education: Ankara University
- Occupations: Historian, writer
- Years active: 1977–2002
- Spouse: Şengül Hablemitoğlu
- Children: 2

Necip Hablemitoğlu (28 November 1954 – 18 December 2002) was a Turkish historian and intellectual. He was assassinated in front of his home in 2002. The perpetrators of this assassination have still not been found. In Ergenekon trial testimony, however, detained suspects Osman Yıldırım claimed that Osman Gürbüz killed him by the motivation of detained suspects Veli Küçük and Muzaffer Tekin for a false flag operation.

== Background and personal life ==
Hablemitoğlu graduated from the School of Press and Journal at the Faculty of Political Science, Ankara University in 1977. Between 1977 and 1978, he published a monthly journal titled Dilde, Fikirde, İşde Birlik. After serving as press consultant in some organizations, he did his master study and doctoral thesis on the History of Turkish Reforms at Ankara University.

He is survived by his wife Prof. Dr. Şengül Hablemitoglu, and daughters Kanije, and Uyvar, named after the outmost forts of the Ottoman Empire in the west and in the north.

== Career ==
Hablemitoğlu was a lecturer on Atatürk's thoughts at Ankara University.

=== Studies on Crimean Tatars ===
He first introduced himself to the Turkish public with a series of articles titled "Yüzbinlerin Sürgünü" (The Deportation of the Hundreds of Thousands), which was published in the Turkish daily Akşam in the 1970s. These articles were later issued as a book with the same title. Considering the silence of the entire world, including the Turkic world, about the brutal deportation of Crimean Tatars by Soviet Union authorities during World War II, Hablemitoglu's articles written during the sensitive "Cold War" era, were indeed a daring attempt to draw world's attention to this politically "hot" issue. He continued to work on Crimean Tatar and other Turkic issues by publishing the journal Birlik in the early 1970s.

Çarlık Rusyası'nda Türk Kongreleri (1905–1917) [Turkic Congresses in Tsarist Russia (1915–1917)] was another of his scholarly contribution to the history of the Turkic peoples of Russia, a subject he was deeply interested in. With his wife Şengül Hablemitoglu, he co-authored one of the most important books related to Crimean Tatars, Şefika Gaspirali ve Rusya'da Turk Kadin Hareketleri (1893–1920) [Şefika Gaspirali and Turkic Women's Movement in Russia (1893–1920)]. (See: www.iccrimea.org/reports/sefika.html). Dr. Necip Hablemitoglu also wrote numerous articles related to Crimea and Crimean Tatars, mostly published in Crimean Tatar bi-monthly journal Kırım, issued in Ankara, Turkey.

=== Studies on German NGOs in Turkey ===
His book, Alman Vakıfları ve Bergama Dosyası, accused German NGOs operating in Turkey of espionage. The accusations were found wanting in court, as a consequence of which his publisher was fined 50 billion Lira (later reduced to a symbolic 1 billion after the prosecution declared that their grievance was not monetary). The Bergama issue revolved around the gold industry. It is claimed that Turkey imported US$800 million worth of gold from Germany annually, and the discovery of a gold mine in Bergama posed a threat, which had to be stopped. So in order to achieve that, the offices of various German NGOs in Turkey are claimed to have backhandedly financed and organized the anti-goldmine activist movements by local villagers in the area.

=== Gülen movement ===
His book Köstebek or Spy, published posthumously, was an exposé of the Gülen movement. In this book, Hablemitoglu claimed an illegal grouping of Gülen Movement in the Turkish police. In June 1999, he appeared on a TV program talking about the Gülenist organization. In that program, he gave detailed description of the structure and inner workings of Gülen movement and its ties to foreign intelligence services. After that TV program, he received death threats from unknown sources.

== Assassination ==
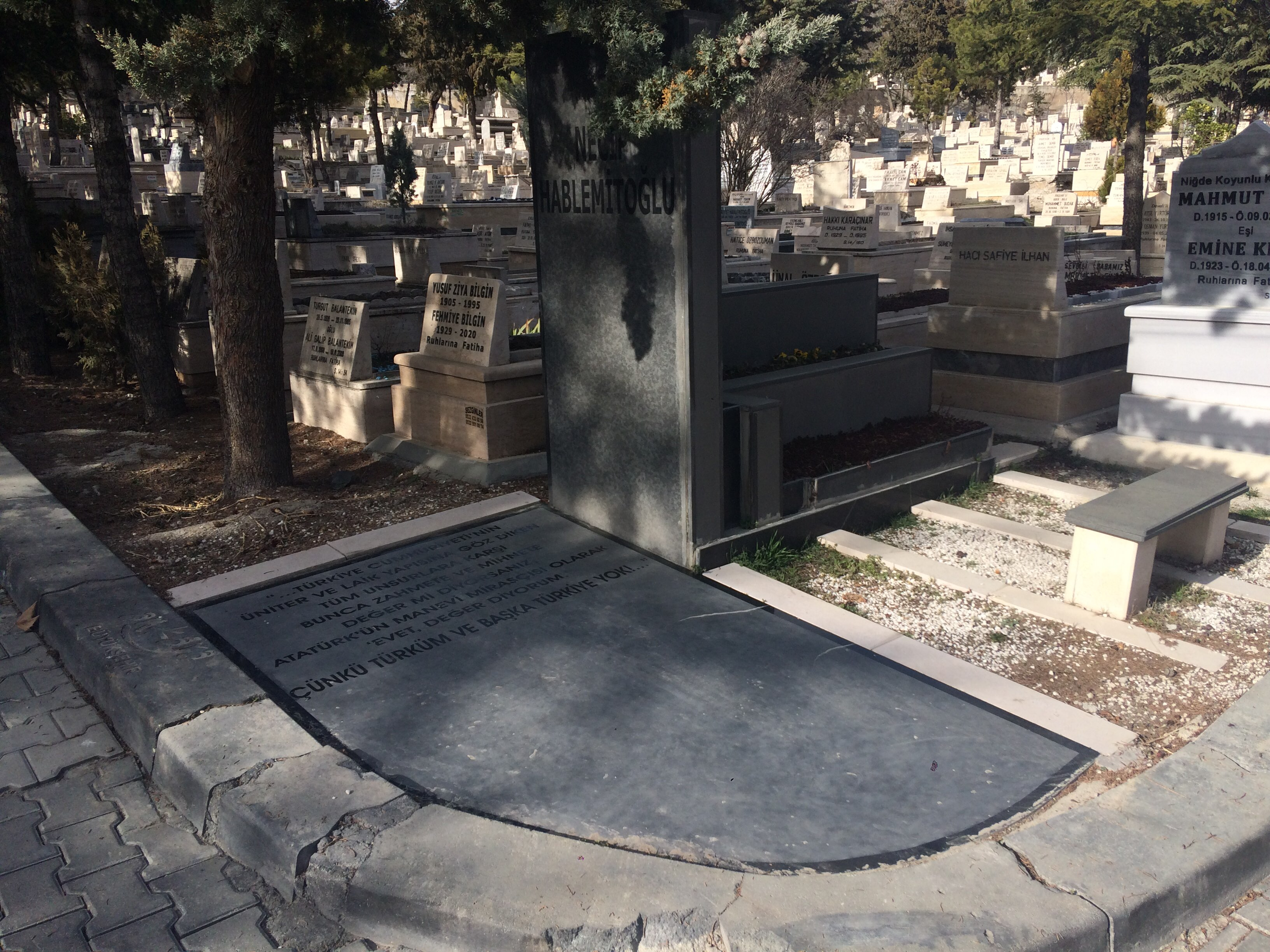
Grave of Necip Hablemitoğlu, Karşıyaka Cemetery.

The murder case is unresolved. According to one hypothesis, he was assassinated in a false flag operation by gendarmerie general Veli Küçük (his trial continues on Ergenekon case) that was pinned on Islamists.

According to another theory, Hablemitoğlu was killed in cooperation with Ergenekon and German NGOs, with the German GSG 9 secret service responsible (the motive relating to the Bergama issue, see "Studies on German NGOs" above). Bedrettin Dalan, a fugitive and first number suspect in Ergenekon Case, allegedly has a fake passport from German Intelligence Agency BND.

Hablemitoğlu was focused on deciphering the Gulen movement in his finals years. In his book titled Köstebek (mole) he wrote that the movement was a terrorist organization that created an alternative organization to the existing government. He was killed 5 days before the book was published. In the last part of the introduction of his book he wrote: "I call on all nationalists to act together against the Fethullahist danger before its too late, I call on you to mold a public opinion for the cleansing of Fethullahist units from the intelligence services..."

Necip Hablemitoğlu was assassinated after the book he wrote about the fifth column activities of Germans in Turkey, and some circles think that the German government may have had a hand behind the assassination.

Hablemitoğlu seems to have known that he was targeted, for his daughters asked him about what to do in the event of an assault.

The last thing he did on the day of his attack was to go grocery shopping. According to security camera records and receipts from the store, he left at 20:05 local time. He was assassinated after returning home a few minutes later.

Hablemitoğlu was buried at Karşıyaka Cemetery in Ankara on 21 December 2002.

== Bibliography ==
- Alman Vakıfları ve Bergama Dosyası (German Trusts and the Bergama Files) (2001).
- Köstebek
- Gaspirali Ismail Bey: Dilde Birlik ve Turkluk Suuru [Gaspirali Ismail Bey: Unity in Language and the Turkish Conscience]. Kırım Vols. 9–10, Nos. 36–40: 17–23, 2002.
- Kırım'da 1917 Ihtilali Donemine Ait Ilk Defa Yayinlanan Siyasal Bir Belge. Kırım Cumhuriyeti'ne Giden Yolda Ilk 'Hitapname': Sosyalizm-Turkculuk [A First-time Published Document on the 1917 Revolutionary Period in Crimea. A first Oratory Related to the Crimean Republic: Socialism and Turkism]. Kırım Vol. 8, No. 30: 3–6, 2000.
- Ilk Defa Yayinlanan Bir Belge. Kırım Tekalif-i Milliyesi: 'Millet Sandigi'na Bir Ruble! [A First- time Published Document. A Crimean National Proposal (Tekalif-i Milliye): 'A Buck (Ruble) for the National Treasury!]. Kırım Vol. 7, No. 28: 3–5, 1999.
- Kırım'da Aclik Yillari (I), 1921–1922 [Famine Years in Crimea (I)]. Kırım Vol.7, No. 26: 12–23, 1999.
- Kırım'da Aclik Yillari (II), 1921–22 [Famine Years in Crimea (II)]. Kırım Vol. 7, No. 27: 3–7, 1999.
- Kırımli Aydinlarin Sorunlari Uzerine Ozelestiri: Kırım'da Aydin Kırımi [A Self – Critique of Issues Related to Crimean Tatar Intellectuals: Liquidation of Intellectuals in Crimea]. Kırım Vol. 6, No. 23: 3–13, 1998.
- Kırım Turk Tarihine Isik Tutacak Onemli Bir Belge: Tatar Partisi Programi [An Important Document that Would Shed Light on Crimean (Tatar) History: Program of the Tatar Party]. Kırım Vol. 5, No. 20: 3–6, 1997.
- Ilk Defa Yayinlanan Belgeler Isiginda: Gaspirali Ismail Bey ve Carlik Rusyasi Hukumetleri [In the Light of a First-time Published Document: Ismail Gaspirali Bey and Tsarist Governments]. Kırım Vol. 5, No. 19: 3–27, 1997.
- Sefika Gaspirali'nin Hatiralarindan: Tercuman'nin Dogus ve Kapanis Evreleri (1883–1918) [From the Memoirs of Sefika Gaspirali: The Eras of Birth and Closure of Tercuman (1883–1918)] Kırım Vol. 5, No. 17: 7–10, 1996.
- Rusya Turkleri'nin Milli Surasi [The National Council of Russian Turks]. Kırım Vol. 4, No. 16: 8–10, 1996.
