= Fikri Karadağ =

Turkish army colonel and statesperson (born 1953)

Fikret Karadağ (born 3 January 1953) is a retired Turkish army colonel who was indicted for treason in the Ergenekon investigation for allegedly heading ultra-nationalist organizations called the Association for the Union of Patriotic Forces (Turkish: Vatansever Kuvvetler Güç Birliği Hareketi), and the Kuvayı Milliye Derneği (National Forces Society).

== Posts ==
Start	Finish	Title	Place
15 June 1998	17 August 2000	Teacher at the Armed Forces Academic Educational Command (Turkish: Silahlı Kuvvetler Akademik Öğretim Elemanı)	Yeni Levent, Istanbul
18 August 2000	14 June 2001	Staff Commander at the 3rd Army Corps Command (Turkish: İstanbul Ayazağa'da 3. Kolordu Komutanlığı Kurmay Başkanlığı	Ayazağa, Istanbul
15 June 2001	9 August 2001	Assistant Commander at the 3rd Army Corps Command and Commander of the Mechanized Infantry Division (Turkish: 3. Kolordu Komutanlığı Yardımcılığı ve Mekanize Piyade Tümeni)	Hasdal, Istanbul
10 August 2001		Administrator at the Armed Forces Academic Educational Command (Turkish: Silahlı Kuvvetler Akademik Öğretim Başkanlığı)	Yeni Levent, Istanbul

== Ergenekon ==
It has been alleged that Karadağ is connected to the assassination of businessman Üzeyir Garih on the basis that the perpetrators knew or were subordinate to Karadağ. Garih was assassinated on 25 August 2001 by Yener Yermez, of the Hasdal barracks' café (Turkish: çay ocağı). Also working in the café was lieutenant Murat Oğuz, who got caught in 2001 for petty fraud with the Ergenekon investigation's key figure, Tuncay Güney. It is alleged that both Oğuz and Yermez were subordinate to Karadağ, in the capacity of Commander of the Mechanized Regiment (Turkish: Mekanize Alay Komutanı).

Ergenekon suspect Oktay Yıldırım (whose grenades in Ümraniye launched the investigation) was also stationed in the Hasdal barracks. Yıldırım was in the 6th Infantry Brigade (Turkish: Hasdal Kışlası 6. Piyade Tugayı) from August 1999 to April 2005.
