= Oktay Yıldırım =

Turkish special forces soldier

Oktay Yıldırım (born 28 September 1971) is a former member of Turkey's Special Warfare Department, and was a defendant in the Ergenekon trials as well as the Turkish Council of State shooting. On 5 August 2013, then aged nearly 42, Yıldırım was sentenced to 33 years and 10 months. Yıldırım was a founder in 2005 of the Kuvayı Milliye Derneği, and was head of its Istanbul branch.

Yıldırım was stationed in the Hasdal barracks; he was in the 6th Infantry Brigade (Turkish: Hasdal Kışlası 6. Piyade Tugayı) from August 1999 to April 2005. He retired in 2005 due to a disability.

== Books ==
- Ergenekon bombalarının sırrı, Istanbul: Kaynak Yayınları, 2010. ISBN 9789753435758
- Savaşmadan Kaybetmek: "Türkiye'nin Silahsız İşgali", Kaynak Yayınları, 2010. ISBN 9789753435901
- Mehmetçik: Tarihsel ve İdeolojik Kökeni, Kaynak Yayınları, 2011. ISBN 978-975-343-606-9

== See also ==
- tr:Osman Yıldırım
