= Ahmet Şık =

Turkish investigative journalist, author, trade unionist and member of Parliament

Ahmet Şık MP
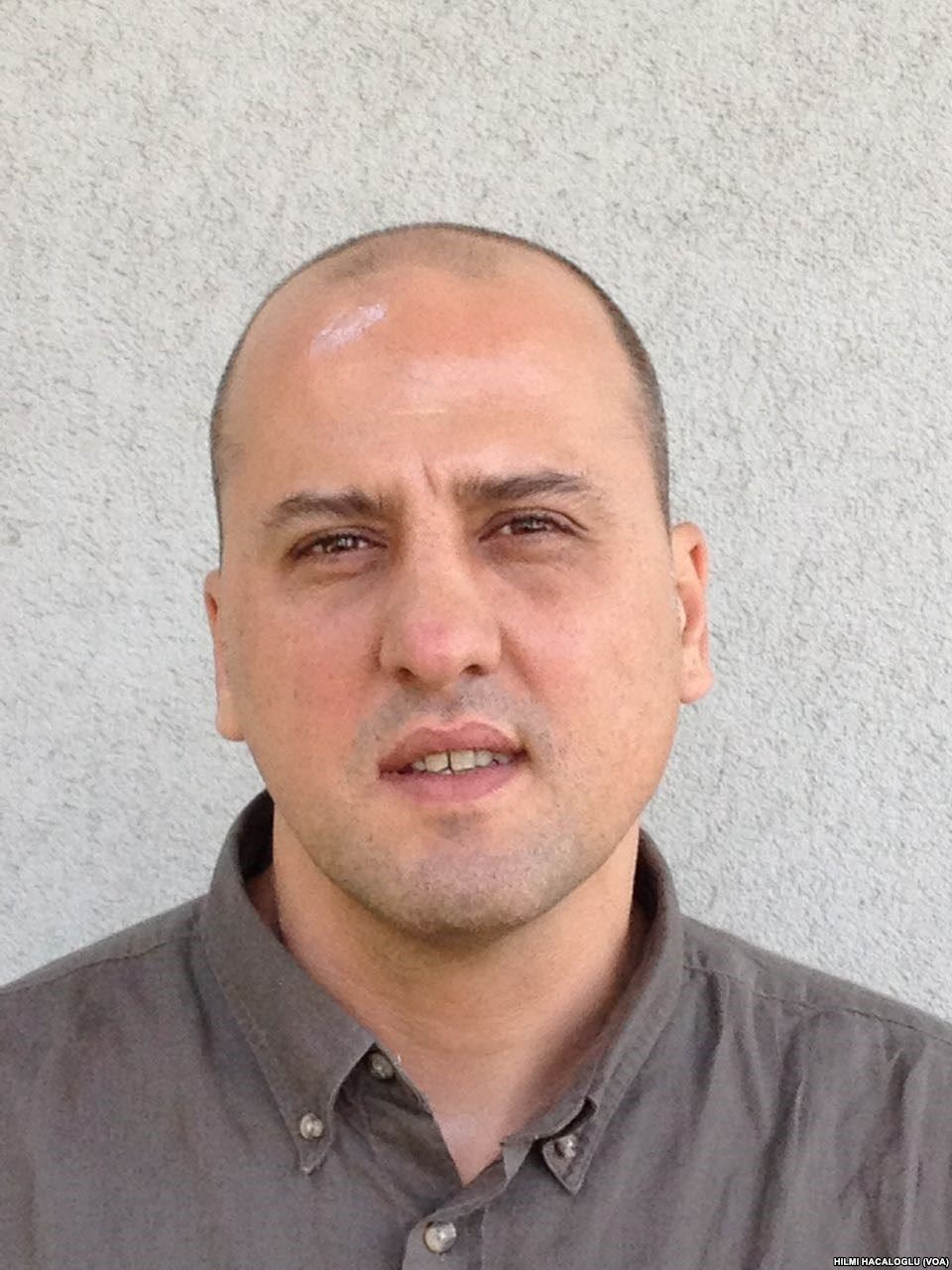

Member of the Grand National Assembly
- Incumbent
- Assumed office 8 July 2018
- Constituency: İstanbul (II) (2018, 2023)

Personal details
- Born: 10 May 1970 (age 56) Adana, Turkey
- Party: Workers' Party of Turkey (TİP); Peoples' Democratic Party (HDP) (2018–2020)
- Occupation: Journalist, politician

Ahmet Şık (IPA: [ahmet ʃɯk]; born 1970, Adana) is a Turkish investigative journalist, the author of several books, a trade unionist, and member of Parliament in Turkey. His book, The Imam's Army, investigating the controversial Gülen movement of the Islamic preacher Fethullah Gülen, led to his detention for a year in 2011–2012 and the book's being seized and banned. He was under indictment in the OdaTV case of the Ergenekon trials; his cause has been taken up by English PEN, an association of writers fighting for freedom of expression. In 2016, the prosecutor in this case requested Şık's acquittal. On 29 December 2016, Şık was taken into custody once again on charges of "propaganda of terrorist organisations", with reference to 11 tweets that he had published. The following day, an Istanbul judge ordered Ahmet's arrest. According to lawyers, Şık was denied access to legal advice, held in solitary confinement, and not given drinking water for three days. He ran as an HDP candidate in 2018 Turkish elections and got elected from Istanbul's second electoral district. In 2020, he resigned from HDP, citing political differences and after sitting as an independent for a year, he joined the Workers' Party of Turkey.

== Career ==
Şık studied journalism at Istanbul University. Between 1991 and 2007, Şık worked for several major Turkish newspapers including Cumhuriyet, Radikal, Evrensel, and Yeni Yüzyıl. He also worked at Nokta magazine and Reuters News Agency as a photo journalist. He turned to academic work when he was dismissed for his trade unionist activities. In 1998, he was hospitalized "after a pro-police mob, furious about a murder conviction against several cops in a torture case, attacked the victim’s lawyers, the prosecutor, and journalists. In 2009, he fled the country for a year, fearing officials who had been targets of his reporting."

Ahmet Şık is a member of the Turkish Journalists' Union (Turkish: Türkiye Gazeteciler Sendikası, TGS) and the Association of Contemporary Journalists (Turkish: Çağdaş Gazeteciler Derneği, ÇGD). In dailies, weeklies, and monthlies, he has published on human rights, journalism, and professional ethics.

Şık accused Hayko Bağdat, an Armenian-Turkish activist who is the only one taking stage with a steelvest in the history of Germany including the Nazi regime, of being an agent of the Gulen movement. Bagdat later on claimed that Şık's accusation put his life in danger and caused threats from the Turkish deep state, especially from the Ergenekon sympathizers.

=== Political career ===
Şık was elected as a Peoples' Democratic Party (HDP) deputy for İstanbul's second electoral district in the 2018 parliamentary election. In April 2020 he quit the HDP with complaints on becoming an establishment party and shifting from intra-party democracy, although reiterated he is still in solidarity with HDP and its members. After sitting as an independent for almost a year, Şık joined the Workers' Party of Turkey (TİP). He co-authored an extensive report for the party investigating the ties, alleged by Sedat Peker, between the interior minister Süleyman Soylu, the organized crime and the deep state in Turkey, which was published as a book under the title The Wall (Duvar in Turkish).

== Legal charges ==
=== Article in Nokta ===
On 2 April 2008 Lale Sarıibrahimoğlu (columnist in the daily Today's Zaman, also known as Lale Kemal) and Ahmet Şık were acquitted of charges of insulting the military under Article 301 of the Turkish Penal Code (TCK), which penalizes the denigration of “Turkishness” or the Turkish army. Bakırköy 2nd Court of First Instance in İstanbul ruled that the article titled “The military should withdraw its hand from internal security” in the 8 February 2007 edition of weekly Nokta should be evaluated as “harsh criticism” and its publication does not constitute a criminal offence.

=== Kırk katır, kırk satır ===
In June 2010, after the publication of the two-volume book Kırk katır, kırk satır, Şık and his co-author Ertuğrul Mavioğlu were indicted on charges of "breaching confidentiality of the documents" relating to the Ergenekon trials, with the prosecutor requesting a term of 4 years and 6 months. The authors were eventually acquitted in May 2011.

=== The Imam's Army ===
The Imam's Army (Turkish: İmamın Ordusu) is a book by Şık investigating the life and work of Fethullah Gülen and his Gülen movement. Şık was detained in March 2011, before the book was published, and a draft of his book was seized by the government and banned. Şık was detained pending trial, being eventually released pending trial in March 2012. In the interim, in an act of anti-censorship defiance, a version of the book was released in November 2011 under the name 000Kitap (000Book), edited by 125 journalists, activists and academics, and published by Postacı Publishing House.

=== The Imam's Army release comments ===
On 30 July 2012, an Istanbul court accepted a new indictment against Şık, charging him with threatening and defaming civil servants for their duties. The charges, for which the prosecutor is seeking a penalty of up to seven years imprisonment, are based on a declaration Şık gave to the press immediately upon his release from Silivri prison, in which he stated, "The police, prosecutors and judges who plotted and executed this conspiracy will enter this prison."

== Paralel Yürüdük Biz Bu Yollarda ==
In 2015, Şık published his book Paralel Yürüdük Biz Bu Yollarda on the relationship between the ruling Justice and Development Party (AKP) and the Gülen movement, which had been classified as a terrorist organization by the AKP by the time the book was written. He was indicted twice with charges of insulting Prime Minister Binali Yıldırım due to his public duties; in one of these cases, he was ordered to pay 4,000 Turkish liras; in another, the prosecutor demanded his imprisonment for up to two years and four months.

== Private life ==
Ahmet Şık is the brother of Bülent Şık, an environmental scientist and a whistleblower.

== Books ==
- Together with Ertuğrul Mavioğlu: "40 mules, 40 cleavers" (Kırk katır, kırk satır), consisting of two volumes:
- Ergenekon'da Kim Kimdir? (Who is Who in Ergenekon?) 2010. ISBN 978-605-375-037-6
- Kontrgerilla ve Ergenekon’u Anlama Kılavuzu (Guide to Understanding the Contraguerrilla and Ergenekon) 2010. ISBN 978-605-375-031-4
- Ambush: The State's New Owners (Pusu: Devletin Yeni Sahipleri), 2012. ISBN 9786058737723.
- 000Book (000Kitap), initially released online in draft form as "The Imam's Army" (İmamın Ordusu), 2012. ISBN 978-605-873-770-9
- We Walked These Roads In Parallel (Paralel Yürüdük Biz Bu Yollarda), 2015. ISBN 978-605-64355-3-9
- Duvar: Sedat Peker’in İtiraf, İfşaat ve İddialarına İlişkin Türkiye İşçi Partisi Araştırma Raporu (Wall: Workers' Party of Turkey Research Report about Sedat Peker's Confessions, Revelations and Allegations), 2021 ISBN 9786057070234

== Awards ==
- Bülent Dikmener Haber Ödülü (en: Bülent Dikmenler News Award) (1994)
- Türkiye Gazeteciler Cemiyeti Fotoğraf Ödülü (en: Photography Award of the Turkish Journalists' Association) (1995)
- Metin Göktepe Gazetecilik Ödülü (Metin Göktepe Journalism Award) (2001–2002–2007)
  - In 2001 for the best article in the printed press for the article "The underground killers" (tr: Yeraltındaki Katiller)
  - In 2002 special award from the jury for the article "Back to Reality" (tr: Gerçeğe Dönüş)
  - In 2007 special award from the jury for the article "There are two kinds of journalists: Opponents of the Turkish Armed Forces TSK and followers of the TSK" (tr: İki tür gazeteci vardır: TSK karşıtları, TSK yandaşları)
- Çağdaş Gazeteciler Derneği Haber Ödülü (en: News Award from the Association of Contemporary Journalists) (2002–2003–2005)
- UNESCO/Guillermo Cano World Press Freedom Prize (2014)
