= Banu Güven =

Turkish journalist

Banu Güven (born 1969) is a Turkish journalist. She worked at NTV for 14 years (1997–2011), presenting programmes such as Gecen Hafta – Bu Hafta and 24 Saat. She has been a foreign correspondent for Milliyet, and writes articles for daily newspaper Radikal. Based in German since 2019, she writes on Turkish issues for WDR and DW. Güven was a member of the jury for the 2012 Metin Göktepe Journalism Awards. In 2017 she was awarded the Nannen Prize for outstanding journalistic achievements.

== Life ==
Banu Güven was born in 1969. She is a Turkish journalist. She worked at NTV for 14 years (1997–2011), presenting programmes such as Gecen Hafta – Bu Hafta and 24 Saat. She has been a foreign correspondent for Milliyet, and writes for Radikal.

In 2011, she resigned after working for NTV for 14 years due to disputes over some of the guests in her TV programme, ‘Banu Guven’le Arti’. One of her guests, novelist Vedat Turkali, speaking about the Kurdish issue in Turkey made some direct reference to imprisoned PKK leader Abdullah Ocalan. Güven was also planning an interview with Kurdish parliamentarian Leyla Zana, which was not allowed to be conducted on NTV.

Güven was a member of the jury for the 2012 Metin Göktepe Journalism Awards. Since 2019. Güven has been based in Germany, due to political problems and restrictions on press freedom in Turkey. She has written on Turkish issues for German public media outlets such as WDR and DW. In 2017 Güven was awarded the Nannen prize for outstanding journalistic achievements, "for her commitment to freedom of the press in Turkey".
