= Bülent Şık =

Turkish food engineer

Bülent Şık is a Turkish food engineer, environmental and human rights activist and a whistleblower. He was convicted after disclosing the results from a government study on environmental pollution and carcinogens.

== Career ==
Şık has worked at Akdeniz University in Antalya, where he was a deputy director of the Food Safety and Agricultural Research Center.

In the early 2010s, Şık worked on a 5-year research project for the Turkey's Ministry of Health investigating a possible relation between the high incidence of cancer in western Turkey (Kocaeli, Tekirdağ, Kırklareli, Edirne and Antalya) and toxicity in local soil, water, and food. Şık found dangerous levels of toxicity in a number of food and water samples, concluding that water in several residential areas is unsafe for drinking. In 2015, he reported his findings to the government. In 2016, he was fired from his university position as assistant professor by a presidential decree-law after signing a petition "calling for peace between Turkish forces and Kurdish militants in southeast Turkey".

In April 2018, as no action was taken on the water pollution for three years, Şık published his findings in the opposition newspaper Cumhuriyet. After the publication, the Turkish government claimed the newspaper publication violated the confidentiality clauses prohibiting to reveal the findings unless approved by the authorities, but it did not deny the accuracy of information. Subsequently the Ministry of Health sued Şık for "revealing confidential information as well as provoking outrage among the public". On 26 September 2019, Şık was sentenced to 15 months in jail for "disclosing information about duty" while he has been acquitted of "providing prohibited information". Amnesty International has criticized the trial, describing Şık as a whistleblower.

In 2025 April, the 13th penal Chamber of the Istanbul regional Court of Appeals acquitted him.

== Private life ==
Bülent Şık is the brother of Ahmet Şık, a journalist and an opposition party member of Parliament.
