= Mustafa Yücel Özbilgin =

- Born: June 20, 1942; Akçaabat, Trabzon
- Died: May 17, 2006 (aged 63); Ankara, Turkey
- Occupation: Judge

Mustafa Yücel Özbilgin (June 20, 1942 – May 17, 2006) was a Turkish supreme court magistrate, who was shot dead in a Turkish Council of State courtroom in Ankara, Turkey on May 17, 2006, by Alparslan Arslan.

== Death ==
The alleged reasoning for the murder of Mustafa Yücel Özbilgin and wounding of four of his fellow judges was that they had previously voted against a Turkish schoolteacher being allowed to wear a traditional Islamic headscarf outside work. One of the judges who was shot, had voted in favour of allowing the teacher to wear a headscarf outside of work, while the other judges who were wounded, voted against.

According to local news reports, the judges were in the midst of a daily meeting in the capital, when the gunman, who was later identified as a lawyer, burst into the room and fired his weapon. Mustafa Yücel Özbilgin suffered a gunshot wound to the head and was pronounced dead later that day in a hospital in Ankara. Police captured the gunman as he tried to escape. According to witnesses, the lawyer shouted, "Allahu Akbar (God is the greatest). His anger will be upon you!"

Özbilgin's death led to demonstrations in Turkey of support for secularism. The President Ahmet Necdet Sezer was applauded as he attended the funeral and warned that "no-one will be able to overthrow the [secular] regime". The Turkish press widely condemned the attacks. Also, the former secularist prime minister Bülent Ecevit attended Özbilgin's funeral in spite of his bad health condition. After the funeral, Ecevit had a cerebral hemorrhage and went into a coma.

The shooting represented a rise in tensions between the fundamentalist secular apparatus of state and supporters of religious rights, as well as Islamic fundamentalism.

== See also ==
- Turkish Council of State shooting
- Ergenekon (organization)
- List of assassinated people from Turkey

== Sources ==
- ANA SAYFA (includes photo)
