= Kaynak Yayınları =

- Company type: Private
- Industry: Media
- Founded: 1982
- Headquarters: Istanbul, Turkey
- Website: www.kaynakyayinlari.com

Kaynak Yayınları (English: Resource Publications) is an independent publishing company based in Istanbul, Turkey.

It was founded in 1982. It has published authors such as Halil Berktay, Doğu Perinçek and Oktay Yıldırım. Another publishing company linked to the Gülen movement, which had the same name, has been banned in various state libraries since coup d'état attempt in Turkey. This led confusion as books of Kaynak Yayınları (one that isn't related to Gülen) was collected out at first as well as the Gülen-related one. After the confusion was realized, the Ministry of National Education sent the logo of Kaynak Yayınları and stopped the collecting of its books.
