= Richard Charkin =

British publishing executive (born 1949)

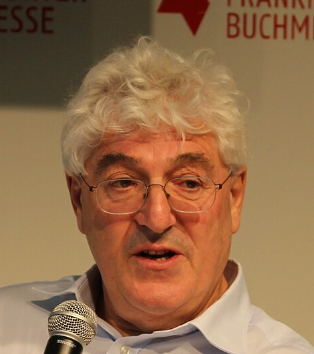
Charkin in 2016.

Richard Denis Paul Charkin OBE (born 17 June 1949) is a British publishing executive. He has held executive positions at Pergamon Press, Oxford University Press, Reed International/Reed Elsevier and Current Science Group, and is the former Chief Executive of Macmillan Publishers Limited and executive director of Verlagsgruppe Georg von Holtzbrinck. In 2015, he became President of the International Publishers Association. He was executive director of Bloomsbury from 2007 to 2018 and is currently President of Bloomsbury China and of John Wisden. He is also a non-executive director of Institute of Physics Publishing, and is Chair of Common Purpose.

He serves on the International Advisory Board of the Frankfurt Book Fair and the editorial board of Logos as well as teaching on the publishing courses at University College London, City University of London, and University of the Arts London.

Charkin is currently visiting professor at the University of the Arts London.

== Early life ==
Richard Charkin was born in North London. He was encouraged by his family to pursue medical school at the Cambridge University Pre-clinical School in 1967. In 1972, Charkin began his first editorial position as Assistant Editor for George G. Harrap & Co, and later participated in publishing courses and book fairs, which introduced him to publishing in genres ranging from trade to academics.

== Career/Education ==
Charkin acquired an MA in Natural Sciences from Trinity College at Cambridge, was a member of the Advanced Management Program at Harvard Business School, and earned the title of Supernumerary Fellow of Green College at Oxford. Charkin has been active in the publishing field since 1972, notable for his 11-year-long run as Bloomsbury Press’ Executive Director as well as his presidency with the IPA and UK PA respectively.

Charkin has had a number of senior executive positions at several publishing companies such as Reed International, Macmillan Publishers, and Oxford University Press. As of late, he resides as Bloomsbury China's president, as well as the non-executive director of Liverpool University Press and the Institute of Physics Publishing. He is also a publishing professor at multiple university locations around London, England and has founded a publishing company of his own, called Mensch Publishing.

== Contribution to the OED ==
Charkin's time as both head of reference and managing director at Oxford University Press was influential to the evolution of the Oxford English Dictionary. Charkin looked to improve both the functional and international purposes of the Press. In 1982, he suggested abandoning manual editing/publication for a more efficient, computerised editing/publishing system. By 1983, Charkin secured a deal with both IBM and ICC to get the necessary equipment and assistance for the computerisation of the Dictionary. By 1984, Oxford University had approved Charkin and co.’s project, which confirmed the digitalization of the OED. Many members of the Press wondered if Charkin's ruminations would lead to the end of the Print, worrying that the introduction of the "New OED" project would exceed the popularity of the original edition. For the next five years, Charkin and co. worked to merge the Supplements with the OED in preparation for the 1989 release of the Second Edition. Charkin and the University Press agreed that, after this Edition, they could begin expanding the distribution of CD-ROMs containing OED text. In 1992, this was made a reality, due to the efforts of Charkin, John Simpson, Ed Weiner, Tim Benbow, Julia Swanell and more. The Internet was still not a public tool at this point, making CD availability necessary for readers and editors. This was achieved through the project team manually inputting the whole text of the OED, a that was made to honour the traditional print-based method.

== Publications ==
- Charkin Blog, The Archive, Macmillan, 2008.
- The Lowdown: top tips for wannabe CEOs (with Richard Pettinger), Creative Content Ltd, 2009
- Publishing Perspectives articles
- My Back Pages: An undeniably personal history of publishing, Marble Hill London, 2023.
- All Rights Reserved: Lessons in Publishing, Marble Hill London, 2026.
