= Sel Yayıncılık =

- Company type: Private
- Industry: Media
- Founded: 1990
- Headquarters: Istanbul, Turkey
- Key people: Irfan Sancı
- Website: www.selyayincilik.com

Sel Yayıncılık (English: Sel Publishing) is an independent publishing company based in Istanbul, Turkey. It was established in 1990, and publishes both original Turkish books and translations of world literature, and both fiction and non-fiction.

Sel and its publisher Irfan Sancı faced obscenity charges in 2011 for publishing William S. Burroughs' The Soft Machine. It had previously faced a number of other obscenity charges, including for publishing Guillaume Apollinaire's Adventures of the Young Don Juan, but been acquitted. This acquittal was overturned by the Court of Cassation in August 2013.

During the 2013 protests in Turkey, Sel helped launched the Gezi Park Library.

== Awards ==
- Freedom of Thought and Speech Prize of the Turkish Publishers Association (2009)
- Publishing House of Year in Memet Fuat Awards (2009)
- Freedom to Publish Special Award by International Publishers Association (2010)
