= Nedim Şener =

Turkish writer and journalist (born 1966)

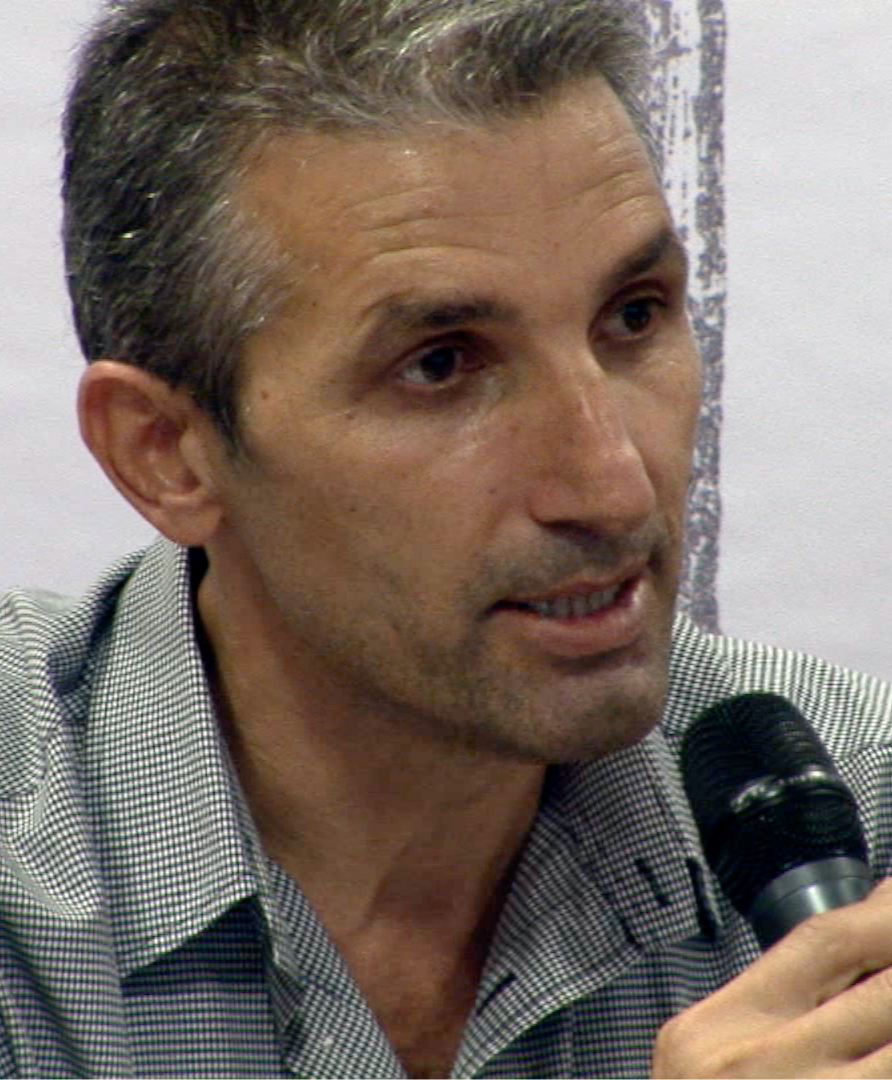
Nedim Şener in 2015

Nedim Şener (IPA: [nedim ʃeneɾ]; born 28 November 1966 in Germany) is a Turkish writer and journalist who has written for the Milliyet (since 1994) and Posta newspapers. He has received a number of journalism awards, including the Turkish Journalists' Association Press Freedom Award, the International Press Institute's World Press Freedom Heroes award, and PEN Freedom of Expression Award. He is particularly known for his 2009 book on the assassination of Hrant Dink, which showed the role of Turkish security. He is under indictment in the Odatv case of the Ergenekon trials because, he believes, his 2009 book alleged that police officers responsible for the Ergenekon investigation were responsible for the Dink murder.

== Career ==
He started working as a journalist at the İlkhaber newspaper. Later, he wrote for the Dünya newspaper. He joined Milliyet in 1994.

The Turkish Journalists' Association (Türkiye Gazeteciler Cemiyeti) has twice named Şener "journalist of the year." In 1999, he was awarded the Metin Göktepe Journalism Award.

Some of his published books are Altın, İstanbul Altın Borsası ve Dünyadaki Örnekleri, Tepeden Tırnağa Yolsuzluk, and Naylon Holding. Other awards he has won include Pen Awards of Netherlands, and Abdi İpekçi Award. In June 2010, Şener was named one of the Vienna-based International Press Institute's World Press Freedom Heroes, along with Lydia Cacho Ribeiro, May Chidiac, Akbar Ganji, Yoani Sánchez, Pap Saine, and Lasantha Wickrematunge.

== The Dink Murder and Intelligence Lies ==
In January 2009 Şener published a book on the 2007 murder of Hrant Dink, The Dink Murder and Intelligence Lies. In it he alleged that police officers responsible for the Ergenekon investigation were responsible for the murder. The officers in question sued Şener soon after; he was later acquitted. In May 2009 an email to police claimed Şener was part of Ergenekon's propaganda network. Şener has said he believes the email was forged by the officers in question, pointing out that although ten names were mentioned, his were the only telephones to be tapped. The taps did not reveal any incriminating evidence.

In February 2011 a raid on the offices of OdaTV produced documents on the basis of which Şener was (along with a dozen others in the Odatv case of the Ergenekon trials) arrested and charged with collaboration with Ergenekon. Odatv staff said the documents were forgeries planted via a trojan horse. Şener was arrested in March 2011 and held in pre-trial detention for over a year. He was released in March 2012 pending trial. The arrest was protested by activists. When the Justice Minister was asked about the arrest, he replied "Whatever I would say would be seen as an intervention in a judicial process."

In 2013, Şener was awarded the International Press Freedom Award of the New York-based Committee to Protect Journalists.

== Awards and honors ==
- 1998, 1999, 2000 The Turkish Journalists' Association Economics Reporter of the Year Award
- 1998 Metin Göktepe Journalism Award
- 2002 Sedat Simavi Journalism Award (for the book Naylon Holding)
- 2007 Contemporary Journalists Association Uğur Mumcu Investigative Journalism Award
- 2009 The Turkish Journalists' Association Press Freedom Award
- 2010 Abdi İpekçi Journalism of the Year Award
- 2010 Kemal Sunal Cultural and Arts Awards Best Writer Award
- 2010 Turkish Publishers Association Freedom of Thought and Expression Prize (for the book The Dink Murder and Intelligence Lies)
- 2010 International Press Institute World Press Freedom Hero
- 2010 PEN Freedom of Expression Award
- 2013 CPJ International Press Freedom Award

== Books ==
- Baba Seni Neden Oraya Koydular? ("Father, Why Have They Put You There?", 2012), Doğan Kitapçılık (The Silivri Penitentiary Process)
- Kırmızı Cuma ("Red Friday", 2011), Doğan Kitapçılık (The Hrant Dink assassination)
- İşte Hayatım, Uğur Dündar ("My Life, Uğur Dündar", 2010), Doğan Kitapçılık (The Biography of Uğur Dündar)
- Dink Cinayeti ve İstihbarat Yalanları ("The Dink Murder and The Lies of the Intelligence", 2009), Destek Yayınları
- Türkiye'de Farklı Olmak ("On Being Different in Turkey", 2009, with Binnaz Toprak, İrfan Bozan and Tan Morgü), Metis Yayınları
- Ergenekon Belgelerinde Fethullah Gülen ve Cemaat ("Fethullah Gülen and His Congregation in Ergenekon Documents", 2009), Destek Yayınları
- Hayırsever Terrorist ("The Charitable Terrorist, 2006), Güncel Yayıncılık (The Sheikh Yasin El Kadı File)
- Fırsatlar Ülkesinde Bir Kemal Abi ("A Kemal Abi in A Land of Opportunities", 2005), Güncel Yayıncılık (The Kemal Unakıtan File),
- Kod Adı: Atilla ("Code name: Atilla", 2004), Güncel Yayıncılık (Susurluk scandal / Alaattin Çakıcı)
- Naylon Holding ("Nylon Holding", 2002), Om Yaynevi (on Orhan Aslıtürk)
- Tepeden Tırnağa Yolsuzluk ("Corruption From Head to Toe", 2001), Metis Yayınları
- Uzanlar Bir Korku İmparatorluğunun Çöküşü ("The Uzans: The Collapse of an Empire of Fear", 2000) (Uzan Group), Güncel Yayıncılık
- Gold: İstanbul’s Gold Exchange and Its Examples in the World (1994)
