= Alparslan Arslan =

Turkish murderer (1977–2023)

Alparslan Arslan (1977 – 17 February 2023) was a Turkish national convicted of murdering Council of State member, Mustafa Yücel Özbilgin, and wounding four others. He also took part in the bombing of the newspaper Cumhuriyet, along with Osman Yıldırım, İsmail Sağır, and Erhan Timuroğlu. All of these events, took place from 10 - 17 May 2006.

== Biography ==
Arslan was born in Kiğı, Bingöl, in 1977. He came from a conservative family. He graduated from Marmara University's law school, in 1998. Later on, he met fellow Ergenekon suspect Sedat Peker, and engaged in financial fraud.

Arslan attended meetings, of the Vatansever Kuvvetler Güç Birliği Hareketi (founded 2005) with Muzaffer Tekin.

== Council of State attack ==
On 17 May 2006, Arslan killed Council of State member Mustafa Yücel Özbilgin. His stated motive was that the council disrespected the devout, citing alleged oppression of women who cover their hair; a wedge issue at the time. Allegations surfaced that this was a false flag attack by neonationalists, and Arslan was recruited for the job.

After the attack, the newspaper and his family reported conflicting information over his motives, with progressives blaming conservatives and vice versa. His father, İdris Arslan, also made inconsistent statements to the press.

Arslan was said to have been incited by retired captain Muzaffer Tekin. When his arrest warrant was issued, Tekin attempted suicide. Also detained was major Zekeriya Öztürk. After recuperating, Tekin admitted knowing Arslan, and together attending a 2004 meeting of the neonationalist Association for the Union of Patriotic Forces (Turkish: Vatansever Kuvvetler Güçbirliği Hareketi). Records indicated that the two had made 27 telephone calls between 2004 and 2006. Tekin said this was related to business they conducted at Doğuş Factoring, which Arslan was the legal counsel to.

It turned out the company's owner, Ayhan Parlak, had written Arslan a check (cheque) for 20,000 Lira before the attack. Parlak was detained for this. Both he and Arslan insisted the check was for legal services rendered. Records showed that Parlak called Tekin 63 times, general Veli Küçük three times, and Arslan 56 times—12 days before the attack.

After Tekin was released for lack of evidence, Arslan renounced his earlier statements that he had acted in a personal capacity, this time blaming his lawyer, Süleyman Esen. Arslan said that Esen and a sheikh they allegedly visited together, Salih Kurter, influenced him. At one point, Arslan stated that his lawyer drugged him and gave him the bombs. Mehmet Taşdelen, the lawyer of another Ergenekon suspect, Emin Gürses, vouched for Esen; his childhood friend. According to Taşdelen, Arslan asked an orphan who washed cars called Osman Boz to stage the attack in return for US$20,000. Boz allegedly reported the proposition but did not appear as a witness because he was intimidated.

At his hearing, Arslan continued to make contradictory statements, and appeared mentally unstable, though he passed a health check.

In the meantime, the Ergenekon investigation began. The Ergenekon indictment alleges that there is a connection between numerous attacks in recent years. Moreover, the attacks are alleged to be planned by a group of neonationalists seeking to further discredit Islamists by staging attacks in their name.

In a petition to the Ankara court handling the case (the 11th High Criminal Court), suspect Osman Yıldırım wrote that the attack was initiated by JİTEM and neonationalists. The court disregarded the petition. Before the trial, he told his lawyer, Mehmet Ener, that Ergenekon made him carry out the attack, and Ener told him to save it for the trial. However, when the trial came, Yıldırım did not speak. Arslan was convicted of murder and four counts of attempted murder. He was sentenced to two consecutive life sentences plus an additional 60 years in prison, all without any possibility of parole.

The Ankara court requested evidence collected by the Ergenekon prosecutors, and they submitted a 550-page file. However, the file did not contain information that would have enabled the judge to establish a connection between the Council of State bombing and the other ones mentioned in the Ergenekon indictment. The court concluded that the attack had indeed been carried out by Islamists, as originally thought. After the verdict was given.

== Ergenekon ==
Arslan was a protected witness in the Ergenekon investigation.

== Verdict ==
On 5 August 2013, Arslan was sentenced to two consecutive life terms plus 60 years in prison without parole as part of the Ergenekon trials.

== Death ==
Arslan was found dead in his detention cell, in Istanbul, on 17 February 2023. According to the Demirören News Agency, he committed suicide, by hanging himself with a garbage bag. His family, on the contrary, claimed that he was murdered. He was buried in Yukarı Baklacı Cemetery in Beykoz, Istanbul.
