= Volodymyr Vakulenko =

Ukrainian writer (1972–2022)

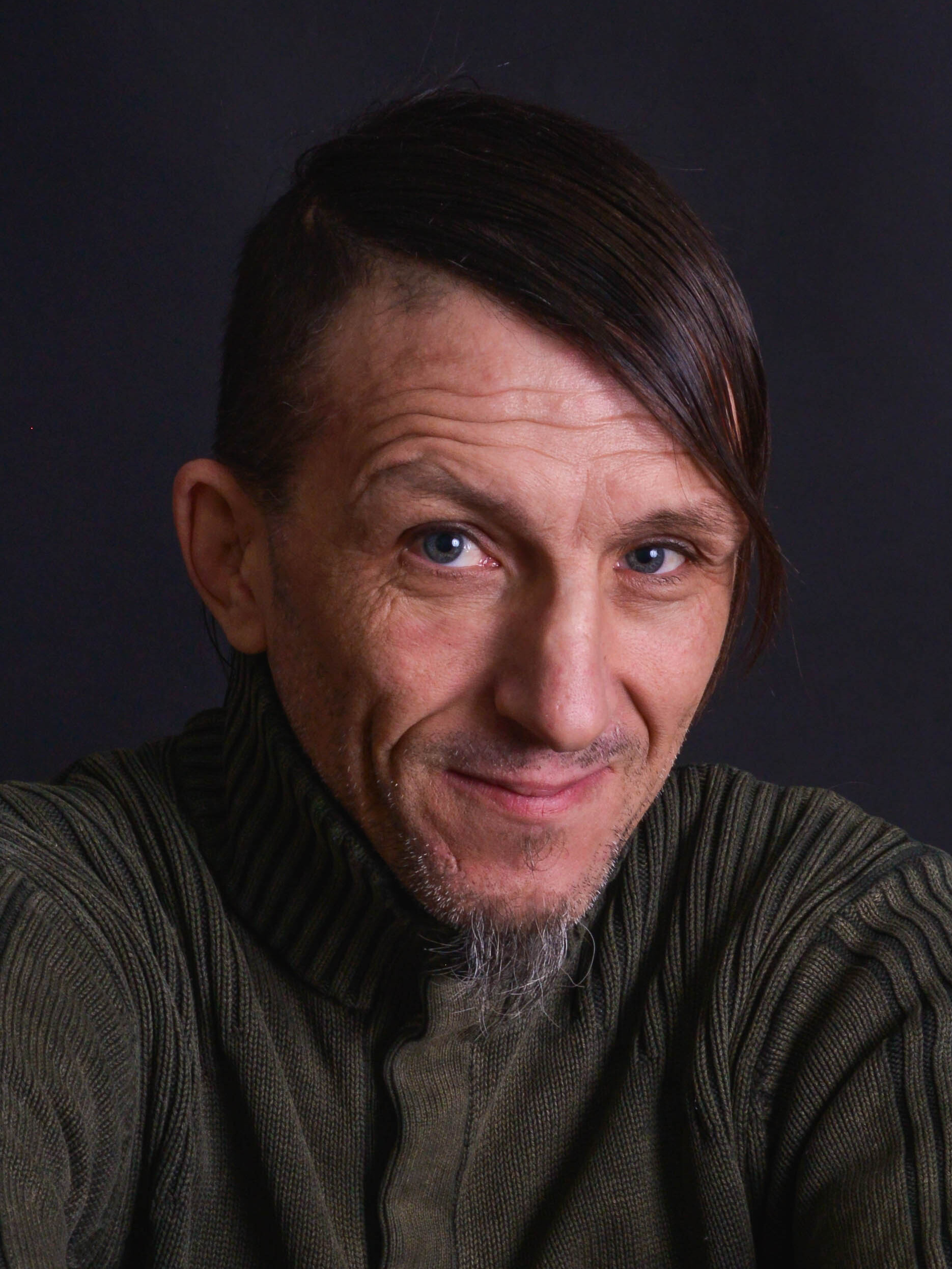
- Vakulenko in January 2020
- Native name: Володимир Володимирович Вакуленко
- Born: Volodymyr Volodymyrovych Vakulenko; 1 July 1972 Kapytolivka, Kharkiv Oblast, Ukrainian SSR, Soviet Union
- Died: Between 24 March and 12 May 2022 (aged 49) Kharkiv Oblast, Ukraine
- Occupation: Writer; poet; activist
- Notable awards: Order of Merit
- Children: 2

Volodymyr Volodymyrovych Vakulenko (Ukrainian: Володимир Володимирович Вакуленко, pronounced [woloˈdɪmɪr woloˈdɪmɪrowɪtʃ wɐˈkulenko]; 1 July 1972 – between 24 March and 12 May 2022) was a Ukrainian poet, children's writer, and Wikipedian, who was also involved in volunteer work and activism. He was murdered during the Russian occupation of the Kharkiv area in Ukraine in 2022. He was a recipient of the Oles Ulianenko International Literary Award and laureate of the Les Martovych Competition.

== Biography ==
Volodymyr Volodymyrovych Vakulenko was born on 1 July 1972 in the village of Kapytolivka, Izium Raion, Kharkiv. From 1979 to 1987, he studied at Kapitolivka Secondary School, and from 1987 to 1989 at Chervonooskilska Secondary School. In 1989–1990, he studied at Izium Vocational School No. 24, majoring to be a pastry chef. He officially started working in 1990, first as a kitchen worker, then acquired various specialties from being a trucker to an apartment repairman (20 years of experience on various bases). From January 1991 to August 1992, he served in the Soviet army, where he received a disability and was discharged shortly before his demobilization. He was divorced and has two sons from his first and second marriages, Vladyslav and Vitalii.

He had started writing in his childhood, and since 2001 has been published in Izium, Kostiantyniv, Donetsk region, Lviv, Kyiv, Zaporizhzhia, Rivne, Ternopil, Vinnytsia, Zakarpattia, Kramatorsk, Donetsk, Luhansk, and Kharkiv press.

From 2003 to 2006, he was a member of the Izium literary association Kremianets, and in 2005 he was a member of the Konstantynivka literary association Prometheus. In 2005-2006, he was the deputy head of the Kremianets literary association in Izium, where he was the editor-in-chief of the Krynytsia children's and teenagers' newspaper. The author appeared online in late 2005.

He prepared for publication and published the almanac "Raisin Mountain" (2007), where his works were also published. Coordinator of the Gothic project and presenter of the presentation of the magazine "Thursday number 30" (theme "Gothic"). January-July 2009 - editor-in-chief of the translation magazine "DzeRkaLo" (published on 2 July).

Correspondent of the magazine "Artistic Facets" (2009).^{[a]} He was a coordinator and compiler of several journals and anthologies. Furthermore, he was a co-organizer of published literary projects. He has been published in anthologies, anthologies, and magazines. His works have been translated into Crimean Tatar, Belarusian, German, English, Esperanto, and Russian.

== Abduction and murder ==
On 22 March 2022, Vakulenko and his autistic 13-year-old son Vitaliy were arrested by Russian troops in Kapytolivka, a Ukrainian village near the town of Izium. By then, Izium and the surrounding villages had been under Russian occupation for several days (Battle of Izium) with Russian soldiers, allegedly, looting private homes and shops, stealing cars and committing war crimes against the civilian population. Vakulenko believed that his pro-Ukrainian views would make him a target of the occupying Russian forces and his house was filled with Ukrainian-language books, including copies of his own, that he figures would be enough to arouse suspicion.

That same day, Vakulenko and his son were returned to the cottage they shared with the author's father. Vakulenko told his parents he had been taken to a "special department" set up in the village, where he had been beaten in the groin. His family worried about his physical condition as he had become very thin over the weeks since the full-scale Russian invasion. There had been little to eat aside from the potatoes from his garden and some canned foods he had bought in Izium before the Russian tanks arrived.

On 24 March 2022, Vakulenko was arrested again by Russian troops. A van painted with the military "Z" symbol pulled up to his house and a Russian soldier carrying a gun hustled Vakulenko into the van. Vakulenko was killed during the subsequent captivity and his corpse was found on 12 May in a mass grave outside Izium. He had been shot and killed by two bullets from a semi-automatic Makarov pistol. When exhumed a week after the liberation, his corpse was initially misidentified despite cemetery documentation that correctly gave his surname but he was later formally identified using a DNA sample. Vakulenko was reburied in December 2022 in Kharkiv.

Following his death and the liberation of Kharkiv, his journal of the war, which he had buried in his backyard, was retrieved by writer Victoria Amelina and published.

Vakulenko is survived by his parents and his sons, Vladyslav and Vitaliy. In 2023, the killers of Vakulenko were allegedly identified as the soldiers Vladyslav Neskorodiev (commander) and S. Udodenko (executor) serving in the armed forces of the Luhansk People's Republic.

== Awards ==
- Hero of Ukraine (1 October 2025, posthumously)
- Order of Merit, 3rd class (22 January 2024, posthumously)

== Tribute ==
On 22 May 2023, the International Publishers Association posthumously awarded Vakulenko with the Prix Voltaire Special Award 2023.

== Notes ==
1. When translated from Ukrainian to English, the magazine can also be translated as "Artistic Edge" or "Artistic Faces" depending on the translation software.

== See also ==
- List of Wikipedia people
