= Metin Göktepe Journalism Awards =

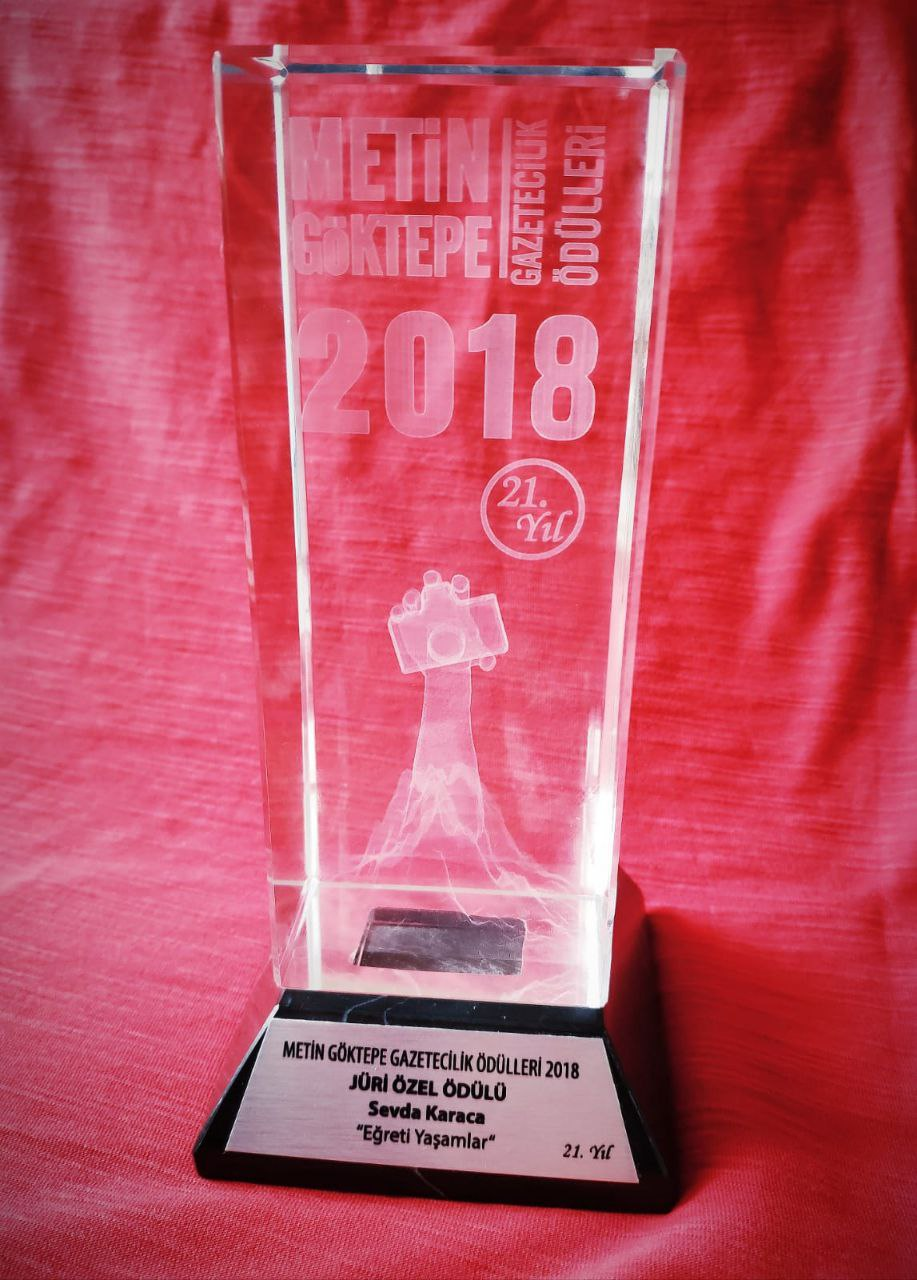
21st Metin Göktepe Journalism Award.

The Metin Göktepe Journalism Awards was established in April, 1998 in honor of daily Evrensel correspondent Metin Göktepe who was brutally killed under police custody. The awards are given to journalists who uphold the integrity of the profession by standing up to pressure and obstacles.

== Awards ==
=== 2012 ===
Jury was composed of Belma Akçura, Nazım Alpman, Celal Başlangıç, Nail Güreli, Banu Güven, Fikret İlkiz, Kamil Tekin Sürek, Ahmet Şık, Nedim Şener, Ece Temelkuran and Ragıp Zarakolu.
After the ceremony, a birthday cake was cut in memory of the 44th anniversary of Metin Göktepe.

Jury Honour Award
Imprisoned Dicle News Agency journalist Zeynep Kuray for her article "Kadınlar Vardır, Hapiste Kadınlar" on sexual abuse in Pozantı Prison on BirGün
Newspaper
Zeynep Kuriş, Dicle News Agency Mersin Correspondent
Television
Ali Burak Ersemiz, Deniz Pirinççiler
Special Jury Award
shared by:
Bilge Eser for her article "Silahı Çevirip Tetiğe Bastı" on the suspicious death of private Sevag Şahin Balıkçı on Sabah
Mesut Hasan Benli for his article "Aklından Bile Geçirme" on Radikal
Elif Görgü for her article "Bir Bardak Su" on Evrensel
Mete Çubukçu for Pasaport: Second Tahrir Uprising on NTV
Photography Award
Selahattin Sönmez for " Sakın Konuşma" on Hürriyet Daily News.
Local Media Award
Nabız Journal (Rize, Turkey)

=== 2015 ===
Written Journalism
Zehra Doğan for her work on a series of articles about Yazidi women escaping from ISIS captivity.
