= International Publishers Association =

Federation of national associations

- Formation: 1896, Paris, France
- Type: International organization
- Purpose: Association of publishers
- Location: 23, avenue de France, 1202 Geneva, Switzerland
- Region served: International
- President: Karine Pansa
- Website: www.internationalpublishers.org
- Formerly called: Congrès international des éditeurs

The International Publishers Association (IPA, originally Congrès international des éditeurs) is an international publishing industry federation of national publisher associations representing book and journal publishing, founded in 1896 in Paris. It is a non-profit and non-governmental organization, to promote and protect publishing and to raise awareness for publishing in the context of economic, cultural and political development.

The IPA's two core pillars are the promotion of copyright and the protection of the freedom to publish. The IPA actively opposes censorship and promotes literacy. Since 2005, the IPA has awarded the Freedom to Publish Prize, renamed the Prix Voltaire in 2016. In 2022, it introduced two additional prizes, a Champion Award and an Innovation Award.

== History ==
The organization was founded in 1896 in Paris, France, as the Congrès international des éditeurs (International Publishers Congress). The IPA was concerned about copyright law.

The organization was active mostly in Europe during its first half century. It provided a platform for national publishers to voice their concerns for future important issues. From its first year, members called to countries to eliminate custom duties to intellectual products, and the tenth Congress in 1933 dealt for the first time with book fairs.

The eleventh meeting of the Congrès international des éditeurs was held in London in 1936. The Congrès International des Editeurs du Film had already formed in 1909 to address concerns about the creation, copyright and distribution of moving pictures. Now Geoffrey Faber, an English publisher, raised concerns about the potential impact of new technologies for sound recording, in his presentation on "Use of the Book on Radio and Voice Machines", warning that "the speed of this change has been increased enormously by the transformations that science brings about in the material conditions of civilised life" and fearing that "the habit of reading may be compromised or displaced to sorne extent by a new custom in direct competition with the old one".

The twelfth meeting was planned for Leipzig and Berlin in 1938. This led to considerable dispute, due to the rise of the Nazi party in Germany. A possible proposal that Switzerland should be the next location, rather than Germany, was withdrawn, possibly as a result of pressure from the German government. Although the conference was eventually held in Germany on 19 June 1938, the United States withdrew in protest.

The Second World War made it impossible to hold the next meeting, planned for Warsaw and Krakow in 1940. During the war, members of the executive committee were able to meet intermittently, and the work of the organization included appeals for the release of members who were prisoners and aid for refugees and their families. The next full meeting of the International Committee occurred in Geneva in 1947. The 13th congress finally occurred in 1954, in Zurich, where the organization met for the first time under the new name of the lnternational Publishers Association. In 1962, the IPA's headquarters moved from Zurich to Geneva.

== Objectives ==
The IPA's two core pillars are the promotion of copyright and the protection of the freedom to publish.

=== Promotion of copyright ===
The IPA describes it as a "fundamental aspect of the human right to freedom of expression". It works on standards, accessibility, collective licensing, piracy, textbook procurement policy, VAT, professional training, literacy, promotion of reading, and book fairs.

=== Freedom to publish ===
One of the IPA's main goals is to protect the right of publishers to produce and distribute the materials they choose to, in other words, to protect their basic human right to freedom of expression. The IPA bases its beliefs on the following human rights standards:

- Article 19 of the Universal Declaration of Human Rights
- Article 19 of the International Covenant on Civil and Political Rights
- Article 10 of the European Convention for the Protection of Human Rights and Fundamental Freedoms

In 2004, the IPA began working with International Freedom of Expression Exchange (IFEX). IFEX was established in 1992 to combat all the offenses that were taking place against freedom of expression. As of 2023 IFEX has over 100 member organizations in 80 countries and monitors and reports violations using an Action Alert Network (AAN). This network allows members throughout the world to campaign against violations using tools such as letter writing campaigns, media coverage, and awareness-raising events. Many of the organizations' actions are focused on freeing imprisoned journalists and keeping journalists around the world safe.

== Activities ==
IPA has official consultative status with United Nations organizations such as the World Intellectual Property Organization (WIPO), the United Nations Educational, Scientific and Cultural Organization (UNESCO) and the Universal Postal Union (UPU), World Trade Organization (WTO), International Telecommunication Union (ITU), Organisation for Economic Co-operation and Development (OECD). IPA has worked with the World Intellectual Property Office (WIPO), UNESCO, and others to collect and analyze international publishing data.

IPA is a founder of the SDG Publishers Compact, formally launched in collaboration with the United Nations in October 2020, to support the achievement of the Sustainable Development Goals in the publishing industry. IPA published a 2020 report of publisher's activities relating to the SDGs, Publishers and the United Nations Sustainable Development Goals, which outlined the ways in which the SDGs are relevant to the publishing industry, with a strong emphasis on ways to take action.

IPA has ongoing connections with industry and regulatory organizations. These include national publisher associations, organizations representing special consumer interests, and reproduction rights organizations which essentially collect license fees for rights holders. In 1980, the International Federation for Reproduction Rights Organizations (IFRRO) developed out of a working group of the Copyright Committee of the IPA and STM, the International Association of Scientific, Technical, and Medical Publishers. IPA is also associated with the International ISBN Agency and the electronic International Standard organization EDItEUR.

=== International standards ===
As an international federation, one of the activities of the IPA is to facilitate the setting of international standards in publishing. The most used international standards include ISBN and ISSN a unique multi-digit identifier for individual books and periodicals, respectively (both print and electronic). IPA is an observer to the International ISBN Agency Board. Other organizations that assist the ISBN Agency include the International Organization for Standardization (ISO), and the International Federation of Library Associations (IFLA).

In 1997, at the Frankfurt Book Fair, the DOI (Digital Object Identifier) was introduced as a joint initiative of the IPA, STM (International Association of Scientific, Technical, and Medical Publishers) and Association of American Publishers.

IPA supports Automated Content Access Protocol (ACAP). IPA is a charter member of EDItEUR, an international organization coordinating standard setting for electronic publications, Through EDItEUR the IPA supports EDItX, ONIX and Thema.

=== Publishers Congress ===
IPA organizes a Publishers Congress every four years, starting from 1896 in Paris, France, where publishers fully and openly discuss relevant, basic, and long-term industry problems and challenges.

In 2008, the 28th IPA Publishers Congress in Seoul, Korea attracted nearly 700 participants from over 45 countries. In its resolution, the Congress expressed the need for reform in the freedom to publish in Burma/Myanmar, China, Iran, and Vietnam, calling for the immediate release of publishers, writers, journalists and bloggers in prison or under house arrest for having exercised their rights to freedom of expression.

=== Copyright symposiums ===
Quadrennially, the IPA hosts a Copyright Symposium. In 2010, Abu Dhabi hosted the 7th Copyright Symposium.

=== Copyright and Google Books Project ===
In 2005 IPA issued a joint statement with PEN USA on the Google Books Project. The statement raised concerns, that Google is disregarding the rights of authors and is infringing copyright law. In the statement, the two organizations assert the rights of an author to determine whether their work will be available in a digital format. The statement raises the concern that once materials are available digitally it is hard to monitor how many copies are produced, which is an infringement of copyright legislation. The IPA and PEN USA call for Google to obtain author permission before making works available in the Google Print Library Project. They also wish for Google to work more closely with authors to make sure that authors’ rights are not violated.

=== Prohibition of religious defamation ===
During the 2000s, a number of initiatives relating to defamation of religion were put forward by the UN Ad Hoc Committee on Complementary Standards on behalf of the Organization of the Islamic Conference (OIC) and others. The IPA joined with other human rights and civil society organizations worldwide, asking that the UN Human Rights Council reject initiatives such as the 2009 resolution for “Combating Defamation of Religions”. Critics of the defamation resolution argued that it failed to distinguish between legitimate criticism of religion and hatred towards believers; that it could be used to discriminate against individuals and suppress legitimate forms of freedom of expression and criticism; and that "international human rights law protects primarily individuals in the exercise of their freedom of religion and not religions per se". In a 2010 Press Release, PEN International and the IPA stated that “Human Rights protect individual human beings, not institutions or religions. Criticism of religions and religious practices must be allowed, in particular when religions are viewed from a political point of view. As organizations representing writers, artists and journalists of all faiths and none, we warn against any regulations prohibiting criticism of any religion or any set of ideas.” Subsequently, emphasis shifted from defamation of religion towards the protection of individuals in exercising their religious rights. In 2011–2013, the General Assembly passed resolutions that affirmed protection from the commission or incitement of "incidents of intolerance, discrimination and violence against persons based on their religion or belief".

=== World Blind Union ===
IPA has been involved in discussions with the World Blind Union (WBU) and other groups addressing accessibility for persons with print disabilities. As of 2008, WBU and other related organizations became involved in the World Intellectual Property Organization (WIPO) Stakeholder Platform, with a stated mission of increasing accessibility. Collaboration in this forum was suspended after disagreements over the negotiation of an international treaty dealing with access to copyright works for people with blindness or visual impairment (PBVIs). Despite considerable consensus that an instrument sensitive to the needs of the PBVI community was needed, the IPA asserted that such a treaty was “impossible”. On February 26, 2011, the WBU withdrew from the WIPO Stakeholders’ Platform and its associated projects, pending an international legal framework to address PBVIs' access to copyrighted works. The World Blind Union and the International Publishers Association substantially differed in their responses to proposals from the 23rd session of the Standing Committee of Copyright and Related Rights.

=== Industry policy: value added tax ===
The IPA advocates for favorable indirect tax systems such as value added tax (VAT) on publications of all formats. IPA considers books should be “zero-rated.” Such policies have been already implemented in countries including the UK, Norway, Korea, Mexico, and Thailand. In its 2010 Global Survey for VAT/GST/Sales tax rates for books and electronic publications, 15 countries have exemptions for all books, 33 have reduced rates for all books, 26 have reduced or exemption for books with limitations, and 13 have no reductions that apply.

=== Educational publishing ===
The IPA created the International Educational Publishers Forum to support the educational publishing industry.

=== Folklore protection ===
Protecting traditional knowledge and expression of folklore may be a concern for publishers who publish fairy tales and traditional stories, school books with reference to local customs or related scientific journal articles. There have been several international efforts for special protection of traditional folklore, notably by WIPO and UNESCO. IPA participates in discussions through WIPO's program for traditional cultural expressions. IPA tries to make sure the rights of freedom of expression and publisher's positive impact relating to such cultural material are not threatened.

=== UNESCO initiatives ===
The IPA maintains working relations with UNESCO and IPA supports the Florence Agreement on the Importation of Educational, Scientific and Cultural Materials (1950) and the Nairobi Protocol (1976). These international treaties allow for the free circulation of educational, scientific, and cultural materials without customs fees. One hundred countries around the world have ratified the Florence Agreement.

The IPA also helped establish UNESCO's World Book and Copyright Day. The purpose of this day is to promote reading, publishing and the protection of intellectual property through copyright.

Beginning in 2001, UNESCO has selected one city a year as a World Book Capital, an initiative in which cities promote and foster books through various events, while conforming to the principles of freedom of expression, freedom to publish and dissemination of information. The title of World Book Capital can be used to promote the winning city and its events and is also a symbolic achievement. Representatives of IPA serve on the UNESCO World Book Capital Advisory Committee. which selects each year's city, along with members from the European and International Booksellers Federation, International Authors Forum, International Federation of Library Associations and UNESCO itself.

World Book Capitals include:

- 2001, Madrid, Spain
- 2002, Alexandria, Egypt
- 2003, New Delhi, India
- 2004, Antwerp, Belgium
- 2005, Montreal, Canada
- 2006, Turin, Italy
- 2007, Bogotá, Colombia
- 2008, Amsterdam, Netherlands
- 2009, Beirut, Lebanon
- 2010, Ljubljana, Slovenia
- 2011, Buenos Aires, Argentina
- 2012, Yerevan, Armenia
- 2013, Bangkok
- 2014, Port Harcourt
- 2015, Incheon
- 2016, Wroclaw
- 2017, Conakry
- 2018, Athens
- 2019, Sharjah
- 2020, Kuala Lumpur
- 2021, Tbilisi
- 2022, Guadalajara
- 2023, Accra
- 2024, Strasbourg

== Organization ==
=== Membership ===
The IPA has 86 global organizational members. It has consultative status as non-governmental organization at the United Nations.

=== Committees ===
- Copyright Committee
- Freedom to Publish Committee
- Literacy & Book Industry Policy Committee
- International Education Publishers Forum

=== Governing bodies ===
The governing body is the General Assembly. The assembly is composed of two representatives of the publishers association from each country; each is allowed a vote in assembly decisions. The assembly meets at least once a year, usually at the Frankfurt Book Fair.

The President is elected by the General Assembly with a term of two years. He or she is the head of the General Assembly and the executive committee. The executive committee formulates plans and policies for the General Assembly to discuss and vote on. The IPA also elects Vice Presidents and regional representatives. A Secretary General is appointed by the executive committee to act as the chief operating officer.

The President as of 2023 is Karine Pansa, who succeeded Bodour Al Qasimi. The Secretary General as of 2015 is José Borghino.

=== List of IPA presidents ===
President biographies from 1896 were assembled at the 125th anniversary, including.

- 1962–1966: Santiago Salvat Espasa
- 1980–1984: Manuel Salvat Dalmau
- 1988–1992: Andrew Neilly
- 1992–1996: Fernando Guedes
- 1996–2000: Alan Gründ
- 2000–2004: Pere Vicens
- 2004–2008: Ana Maria Cabanellas, first female IPA President in 108 year-history
- 2009–2010: Herman P. Spruijt
- 2011–2014: Youngsuk “Y.S.” Chi
- 2015–2017: Richard Charkin
- 2017–2019: Michiel Kolman
- 2019–2021: Hugo Setzer (Manual Moderno, Spain)
- 2021–2023: Bodour Al Qasimi second female IPA President in 129 year-history
- 2023– : Karine Pansa

=== List of secretaries general ===
Secretaries general have included the following:

- 2000–2003: Benoît Müller
- 2003–2015: Jens Bammel
- 2015– : José Borghino.

== Awards given ==
Since 2005, the IPA has awarded the Freedom to Publish Prize, renamed the Prix Voltaire in 2016. In 2022, it introduced two additional prizes, a Champion Award and an Innovation Award.

=== IPA Prix Voltaire ===
Since 2005, the IPA has been awarding the annual IPA Prix Voltaire known until 2016 as the "IPA Freedom to Publish Prize", to honour a person or an organization anywhere in the world that has defended and promoted the freedom publish with courage. It consists of a monetary award and a certificate. The list of past winners is as follows:

- 2025 Nadia Kandrusevich (Belarus) and Dmitri Strotsev (Belarus)
- 2024 Samir Mansour (Palestine)
- 2023 Mazin Lateef Ali (Iraq) & Volodymyr Vakulenko (2023 IPA Prix Voltaire Special Award, posthumously) (Ukraine)
- 2022 Same Sky Books (Thailand)
- 2021 Dar al Jadeed (Lebanon)
- 2020 Liberal Publishing House, Vietnam
- 2019 Khaled Lotfy, Egypt
- 2018 Gui Minhai, Sweden/Hong Kong
- 2017 Turhan Günay and Evrensel, Turkey
- 2016 Raif Badawi, Saudi Arabia
- 2014 Ihar Lohvinau, Belarus
- 2012 Jonathan "Zapiro" Shapiro, South Africa
- 2011 Bui Chat, Giay Vun Publishing, Vietnam He was arrested by Vietnam authorities shortly after his return from Buenos Aires, where he received his prize. Though temporarily released in May, he was subject to further interrogation.
- 2010 Israpil Shovkhalov and Viktor Kogan-Yasny, DOSH Magazine, Chechnya, Russia
- 2010 Freedom to Publish Prize Special Award to Irfan Sanci, Sel Yayıncilik, Turkey
- 2009 Sihem Bensedrine, Neziha Rjiba and Mohamed Talbi, OLPEC, Tunisia
- 2008 Ragıp Zarakolu, Belge, Turkey
- 2007 Trevor Ncube, Zimbabwe
- 2007 Freedom to Publish Prize Special Award to Anna Politkovskaya, Russia and Hrant Dink, Turkey
- 2006 Shalah Lahiji Roshangaran, Iran
