= Agreement on the Importation of Educational, Scientific and Cultural Materials =

1950 UNESCO treaty

The Agreement on the Importation of Educational, Scientific and Cultural Materials (also known as the Florence Agreement) is a 1950 UNESCO treaty whereby states agree to not impose customs duties on certain educational, scientific, and cultural materials that are imported.

== Content ==
The materials covered by the treaty include printed books, newspapers, periodicals, government publications, printed music, works of art, antiques over 100 years old, scientific instruments used in education or research, and educational films. The Agreement does not apply to materials that contain excessive amounts of advertising material.

== Creation and state parties ==
The Agreement was approved by resolution on 17 June 1950, at a UNESCO General Conference in Florence, Italy. It was opened for signature on 22 November 1950 at Lake Success, New York and entered into force on 21 May 1952. As of 2014, it has been signed by 29 states and ratified by 102 states, which includes 101 United Nations member states plus the Holy See. The states that have signed but not ratified the Agreement are Colombia, Dominican Republic, Ecuador, Guinea-Bissau, Honduras, and Peru. There is no time limit on either signing or ratifying the Agreement.

== Protocol ==
On 26 November 1976, the Protocol to the Agreement on the Importation of Educational, Scientific or Cultural Materials was concluded in Nairobi, Kenya. The Protocol, which is also known as the Nairobi Protocol, expands the types of materials covered by the Agreement. The Protocol entered into force on 2 January 1982 and as of 2013 has been signed by 13 states and ratified by 46 states. New Zealand and Oman have signed but not ratified the Protocol.
