= Turkish Council of State shooting =

2006 shooting in Ankara, Turkey

- Location: 39.9053°N 32.7534°E; Council of State, Ankara, Turkey
- Date: 17 May 2006; 10.00am
- Deaths: 1, Mustafa Yücel Özbilgin
- Injuries: 4
- Perpetrators: Alparslan Arslan, Osman Yıldırım and unknown others

The Turkish Council of State shooting occurred on 17 May 2006. Alparslan Arslan entered the building of Council of State, Turkey's highest administrative court, in Ankara and shot five judges, killing judge Mustafa Yücel Özbilgin. Arslan was sentenced to life imprisonment in 2008.

== Incident ==
On 17 May 2006, gunman Alparslan Arslan made his way into the Council of State building in Ankara and subsequently shot five judges. According to the deputy head of the Council of State, Arslan shouted "I am the soldier of God". One of the wounded judges, Mustafa Birden, had been criticized for ruling against teachers wearing Muslim headscarves. Judge Mustafa Yücel Özbilgin was shot in the head and was pronounced dead later that day after six hours of surgery in an Ankara hospital .

Two janitors at the Court later said they had seen Arslan at the Court the day before and considered his behaviour suspicious enough to report it to the police.

The gun was supplied by İbrahim Şahin.

== Aftermath ==
Özbilgin's mass funeral saw protestors calling Prime Minister Recep Tayyip Erdoğan a "murderer" and demanding the government's resignation. Erdoğan's government had criticised the court's rulings on headscarves and other issues. Erdoğan described the funeral as "a move aimed at fanning unrest in the country", while the Chief of the General Staff of the Republic of Turkey, General Hilmi Özkök, said that the protests should "not remain the reaction of just one day, a one-off event. ... It must gain permanence, as something continuous. It must be pursued by everyone." Erdoğan also said that "We should all make efforts to strengthen democracy, secularism ... and the rule of law."

Arslan later apologised to two of the judges he had wounded, saying that one had voted against the headscarf ban while the other had not been involved in the decision.

== Investigation ==
Arslan's father, İdris, made contradictory remarks on the matter. Initially he said his son was not religious and must have been coerced. One month later he defended his son's actions in the name of upholding the nation's values. Ergenekon prosecutors revealed that after the assassination, Arslan's mother and father had received 32,000 euros and $30,000, respectively.

An investigation by the Air Force Office of Special Investigations on stolen weaponry in Iraq revealed that the gun was of the same type used in shooting priest Andrea Santoro (whose attacker had shouted the same words).

In April 2010, TÜBİTAK said it was unable to retrieve security camera footage of the incident, with footage missing from the day of the incident and the day before. The security company is owned by OYAK.

== Trial ==
There were allegations that the attack was orchestrated by retired gendarmerie general Veli Küçük, who was detained in the Ergenekon investigation on conspiracy charges. Osman Yıldırım, one of those eventually convicted for the attack, said the decision to go ahead with the attack had been made at a meeting at an Istanbul apartment at which he and Arslan had met with Küçük. In 2008 the case was consolidated with that of the 2008 bombing of the newspaper Cumhuriyet, also allegedly connected to Ergenekon.

== Verdict ==
On 13 February 2008, Alparslan Arslan and Osman Yıldırım were sentenced to life imprisonment without parole. The detailed ruling by Ankara's 11th High Criminal Court stated that no connection to Ergenekon was found. The conclusion took into consideration a 550-page file submitted by the Istanbul public prosecutor's office.

== See also ==
- Istanbul nightclub shooting
- Terrorism in Turkey
- 2024 Istanbul church shooting
