= Kuvayı Milliye Derneği =

Historical organization during the Turkish War of Independence

The Kuvayı Milliye Derneği (National Forces Society) is a racist ultra-nationalist organization based in Mersin, Turkey. It was founded on 11 November 2005 by retired Turkish army colonel Fikri Karadağ.
