= Council of State (Turkey) =

Highest administrative court in Turkey

Coordinates: 39°55′30″N 32°51′13″E

- Danıştay
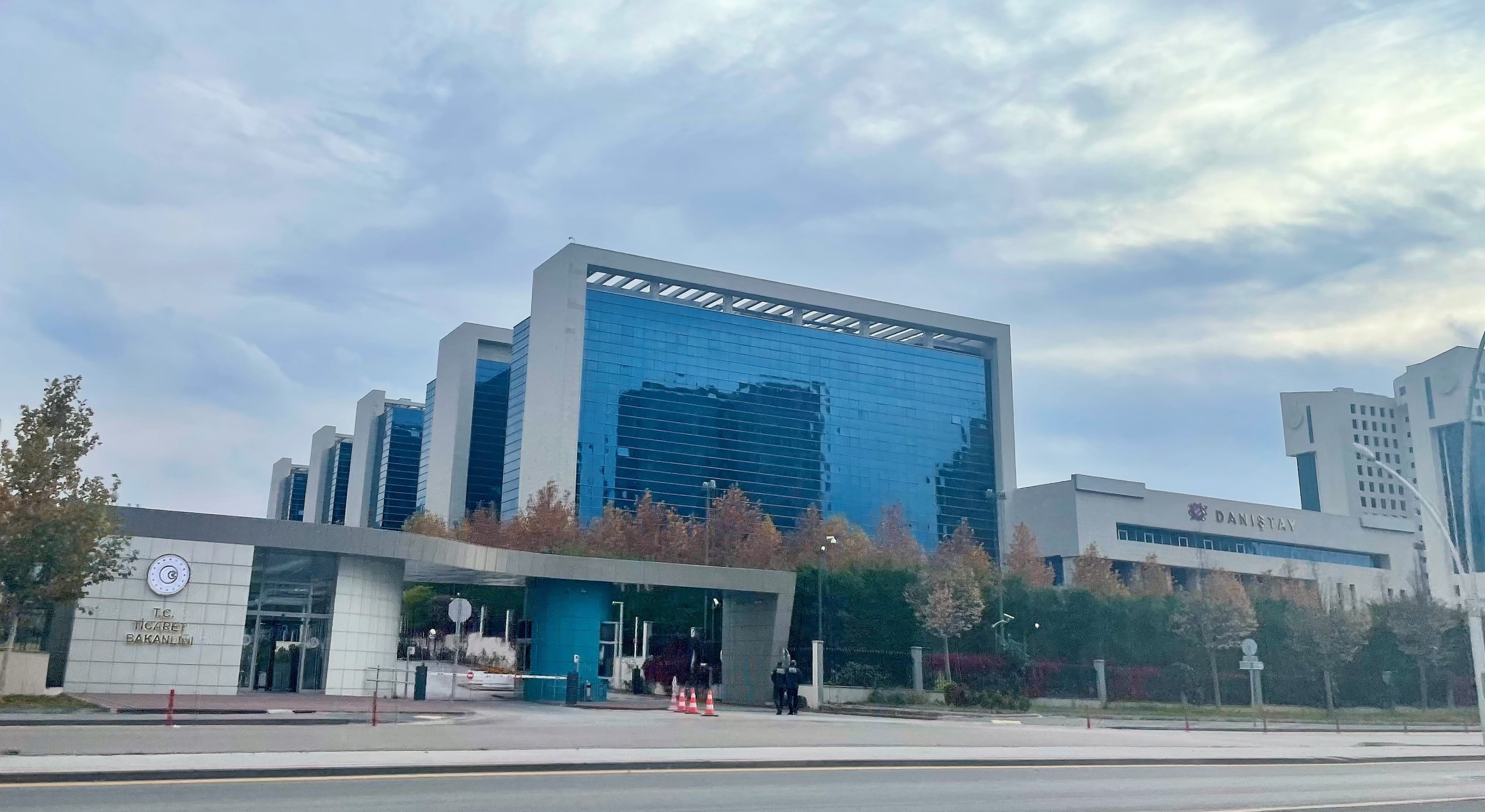
- Established: 1868
- Jurisdiction: Turkey
- Location: Ankara
- Authorised by: Constitution of Turkey
- Website: www.danistay.gov.tr

The Council of State (Turkish: Danıştay) is the highest administrative court in the Republic of Turkey and is located in Ankara. Its role and tasks are prescribed by the Constitution of Turkey within the articles on the supreme courts.

According to Article 155 of the Turkish Constitution (1982),

"The Council of State is the last instance for reviewing decisions and judgments given by administrative courts and not referred by law to other administrative courts. It shall also be the first and last instance for dealing with specific cases prescribed by law.

The Council of State shall try administrative cases, give its opinion within two months on the conditions and the contracts under which concessions are granted concerning public services, settle administrative disputes, and discharge other duties prescribed by law.

Threefourths of the members of the Council of State shall be appointed by the Council of Judges and Prosecutors from among the first category administrative judges and public prosecutors, or those considered to be of this profession; and the remaining quarter by the President of the Republic from among officials meeting the requirements designated by law.

The President, Chief Public Prosecutor, deputy presidents, and heads of departments of the Council of State shall be elected by the General Assembly of the Council of State from among its own members for a term of four years by secret ballot and by an absolute majority of the total number of members. They may be re-elected at the end of their term of office."

Currently within the Turkish Council of State there are 15 divisions; 14 of them are judicial divisions and one of them is consultative division. In each division, there are at least five members, including the head of the division. Judgments are delivered by an absolute majority.

The Plenary Assembly of the Council of State consists of 156 members, including the president, advocate general, vice presidents, head of the divisions and members.

The current president of the council is Zeki Yiğit.

== See also ==
- Turkish Council of State shooting
- Supreme Council of Judicial Ordinances, a predecessor
- Council of State (Ottoman Empire), a predecessor
