= List of prosecuted writers in Turkey =

This article contains a list of writers (fiction writers, journalists, academics, etc.) who have been prosecuted by the Republic of Turkey.

== Grounds for prosecution ==
Many are prosecuted for statements deemed unpatriotic by official institutions, or by Turkish nationalists. Several disputed laws are often used for this, among others Article 301. On the scale of those prosecutions, and especially the abuse of Article 301, Amnesty International stated that: "The frequency with which Article 301 is being used and the arbitrary nature of its application represent a real threat to freedom of speech in Turkey. Individuals are being harassed and threatened with imprisonment simply for speaking or writing about aspects of Turkish history or culture that do not conform to an imposed nationalist ideal."

The scale of these state-sponsored actions against dissenting opinions is also clear from the fact that in one case, in 1996, 184 of Turkey's leading writers, artists and publishers were indicted under the Anti-Terror Law for "advocacy of separatism" in a single trial at Istanbul State Security Court. The trial was halted in October 1997 by force of a new law passed by the Turkish parliament.

== List of writers ==
The following is an incomplete list of these prosecuted Turkish writers (and other persons), excluding cases listed at Article 301:

- Ömer Asan, charged in 2002 with allegations of the breach of Article 8 of the Anti-Terror Law by "propagandating separatism" for his book Pontos Kültürü. In 2003 Article 8 was abolished, and he was acquitted as a result.
- İsmail Beşikçi, scholar sentenced several times to imprisonment on propaganda charges for his writings on Turkish Kurds. Until the 2000s 36 of his 42 books were banned.
- İpek Çalışlar, charged in August 2006 for insulting Atatürk. In December 2006 she was acquitted.
- Gökhan Gençay, writing for the BirGün newspaper, prosecuted for his reporting on conscientious objectors.
- Erol Önderoğlu, journalist and representative of Reporters Without Borders. Arrested in 2016 for supporting Ozgur Gundem, a Kurdish newspaper, and accused of supporting terrorists.
- Baskin Oran, former member of the Human Rights Advisory Board (HRAB) for the Turkish Prime Minister's office, charged in May 2006 with "public humiliation of the courts authority" and "dangerous incitement of public hatred and enmity". Oran stated: "My freedom of expression is being ambushed for strategic reasons." In November 2006 he was acquitted.
- Pınar Selek, convicted to life imprisonment in January 2013 in connection to a 1998 explosion that occurred at the Spice Bazaar, Istanbul, the 15-year-long 'judicial harassment' against Selek is widely considered to have been motivated by her contact with Kurdish separatists as part of her sociological research.
- Öget Öktem Tanör, Turkish neuropsychologist, charged with "terrorism propaganda" by the government of Recep Tayyip Erdogan, as a result of signing a petition asking the government to cease military operations in the Kurdish part of Turkey.
- Sehmus Ülek, vice-president of the human rights organization Mazlum-Der.
- Atilla Yayla, a political theorist, was convicted in January 2008 and sentenced to a suspended 15-month jail sentence for insulting Atatürk by claiming in a 2006 speech that the early Turkish Republic was not entirely democratic and that the cult of personality surrounding him was illogical. He is now living in self-imposed exile in England.
- Murat Yetkin, writer for the Radikal newspaper, charged in June 2006 with attempting to influence a fair trial for having criticised the prosecution of Orhan Pamuk. In November 2006 the charges were dropped.
- Ragip Zarakolu, a Turkish human rights activist and publisher who has long faced legal harassment for publishing books on controversial subjects in Turkey, especially on minority and human rights in Turkey.

== See also ==
- Article 301 (Turkish penal code)
- Censorship in Turkey
- Human rights in Turkey
- Human rights in Europe
- International Freedom of Expression Exchange
- List of arrested journalists in Turkey
- List of arrested mayors in Turkey
