= Zarakolu =

Zarakolu is a Turkish surname. Notable people with the surname include:

- Ayşe Nur Zarakolu (1946–2002), Turkish author, publisher, and human rights activist
- Deniz Zarakolu, Turkish activist
- Ragıp Zarakolu (born 1948), Turkish human rights activist
