= Ayşe Nur Zarakolu =

Author, publisher, human rights activist (1946–2002)

- Born: 9 May 1946; Antakya, Turkey
- Died: 28 January 2002 (aged 55); Istanbul, Turkey
- Occupation: Publisher
- Known for: Publishing, human rights advocacy
- Spouse: Ragıp Zarakolu
- Children: 2

Ayşe Nur Zarakolu (née Sarısözen; 9 May 1946 – 28 January 2002) was a Turkish author, publisher and human rights advocate. She was co-founder, with her husband Ragıp Zarakolu, of notable Turkish publishing house Belge and, in the 1980s, became the director of book-distribution company Cemmay, the first woman in the nation to hold such a position. Zarakolu's publications brought her into frequent conflict with Turkish press laws; in 1997, The New York Times identified Zarakolu as "one of the most relentless challengers to Turkey's press laws". Issues Zarakolu helped publicize in Turkey include the Armenian genocide and human rights of Kurdish people in Turkey. Imprisoned multiple times for her publications, she was designated a prisoner of conscience by Amnesty International and her legacy continued to face legal challenge in Turkey after her death. She has received multiple awards and honors for her work and the Human Rights Association of Turkey (Turkish: İnsan Hakları Derneği) bestows the Ayşe Zarakolu Freedom of Thought prize in her honor.

== Biography ==
She was born Ayşe Nur Sarısözen on 9 May 1946 in Antakya. A sociologist by education, she entered publishing in 1968 before moving to Istanbul University in 1970 as head librarian at the Institute of Financial Studies. Zarakolu wed Ragıp Zarakolu and mothered two children. Before her death of cancer in Istanbul on 28 January 2002, Zarakolu became a notable author, publisher, and human rights advocate. In 1976 or 1977, Zarakolu and her husband launched a publishing house, Belge (translated "The Document"), which published books on history and politics, as well as poetry, and in the 1980s, she also became the director of book-distribution company Cemmay; according to The Independent, she was "the first woman in Turkey" to hold such a position. In 1998, she helped found the İHD.

== Legal battles ==
Zarakolu focused attention to the situations and histories of Kurds in Turkey, Armenians in Turkey and Greeks in Turkey. Some specific publications by Belge in Turkey that were subjects of controversy include the poems of Mehdi Zana, Les Arméniens: histoire d'un génocide (The Armenians: history of a genocide) by Yves Ternon, The Forty Days of Musa Dagh by Franz Werfel, several books by İsmail Beşikçi, and the essays of Lissy Schmidt, a German journalist who had died while covering conditions in Iraqi Kurdistan.

While The Independent suggested that the books published by Belge "in any other country would hardly be controversial", Zarakolu was subject to prosecution in Turkey for her publications, including lengthy imprisonments and fines, and Belge was fire-bombed in 1995. According to The New York Times, which in 1997 identified Zarakolu as "one of the most relentless challengers to Turkey's press laws", books she published "denounce[d] the Government's war against Kurdish guerrillas, accuse[d] the security forces of involvement with death squads and document[ed] mass killings of Armenians in the early years of the century." İHD characterized Zarakolu in 2006 as "one of the vanguards of the fight for the freedom of thought and expression." In press release, the organization noted that not only had she been willing to publish İsmail Beşikçi's Kurdistan, an Inter-States Colony in defiance of a ban on the word "Kurd", but that she had "started debate on the question of "Armenian Genocide" which still remains as a taboo in Turkey."

The Armenian Reporter indicated in 2005 that the number of times Zarakolu was arrested was "more than 30." Imprisoned for her publications four times, Zarakolu was named a prisoner of conscience by Amnesty International. In a 2008 interview, her husband indicated that, during her imprisonment, Zarakolu had been tortured. In a letter dated 2001, Zarakolu expressed her belief that "The way to prevent yet more genocides, yet more tragedies from happening is through the communal experience of expressing heartfelt repentance for the shame of what has gone before", also indicating that "As far as I am concerned, I have done my duty. I have done something that everyone should do.... And I shall continue to do so, right through to that supreme moment."

After her death in 2002, Zarakolu faced additional charges for publishing the books Pontos Kültürü by Ömer Asan and The Song of Liberty by Hüseyin Turhallı, but charges were eventually dropped. Her son, Deniz Zarakolu, was charged for "inciting revenge or hatred, which could cause people to become dangerous for each other" as a result of the speech he made at her funeral, but he was later acquitted.

== Honors ==
Zarakolu received multiple recognitions from the Turkish Publishers' Association, Human Rights Watch and International PEN. In 1998, she was honored by the International Publishers Association with an inaugural International Freedom to Publish Award at the Frankfurt Book Fair; however, Zarakolu's passport had been confiscated by Turkish officials years before and she was not permitted to attend. Received the 1997 PEN/Barbara Goldsmith Freedom to Write Award.

== Legacy ==
The İHD bestows in her memory the "Ayşe Zarakolu Freedom of Thought" prize. In 2004, the European Court of Human Rights condemned Turkey for its conviction of Zarakolu in connection to her publication of a book detailing the story of Ferhat Tepe, a murdered journalist.

In 2007, the metropolitan municipality of Diyarbakır in southeastern Turkey named the "Ayşenur Zarakolu Free Women's Park Forest" on Dicle Kent Boulevard in her honor. However, they were required to rename the park when the province governor's office objected to the name. The matter was brought before the Regional Administrative Court, which forbid the naming on the grounds that Zarakolu "supported separatist ideas and spread terrorist propaganda both in her own books and in the books she published", though her husband later noted that both the article under which she was convicted and the court that convicted her have been abolished.
