= Results breakdown of the 2011 Turkish general election =

This is the results breakdown of the 2011 Turkish general election.

== Largest party by province ==
The following table is a complete list of provinces changing hands as a result of the election based on the notional results of the 2002 and 2007 elections, notwithstanding the results of 2003 by-election in Siirt.

Province	2002 election		2007 election		2011 election	
Adana	d	Justice and Development Party	d	Justice and Development Party	d	Justice and Development Party
Adıyaman		Justice and Development Party		Justice and Development Party		Justice and Development Party
Afyonkarahisar		Justice and Development Party		Justice and Development Party		Justice and Development Party
Ağrı		Democratic People's Party		Justice and Development Party		Justice and Development Party
Aksaray		Justice and Development Party		Justice and Development Party		Justice and Development Party
Amasya		Justice and Development Party		Justice and Development Party		Justice and Development Party
Ankara		Justice and Development Party		Justice and Development Party		Justice and Development Party
Antalya		Republican People's Party		Justice and Development Party		Justice and Development Party
Ardahan		Republican People's Party		Justice and Development Party		Justice and Development Party
Artvin		Republican People's Party		Justice and Development Party		Justice and Development Party
Aydın		Republican People's Party		Justice and Development Party		Republican People's Party
Bartın		Justice and Development Party		Justice and Development Party		Justice and Development Party
Batman		Democratic People's Party		Justice and Development Party		Independent
Balıkesir		Justice and Development Party		Justice and Development Party		Justice and Development Party
Bayburt		Independent		Justice and Development Party		Justice and Development Party
Bilecik		Justice and Development Party		Justice and Development Party		Justice and Development Party
Bingöl		Justice and Development Party		Justice and Development Party		Justice and Development Party
Bitlis		Democratic People's Party		Justice and Development Party		Justice and Development Party
Bolu		Justice and Development Party		Justice and Development Party		Justice and Development Party
Burdur		Justice and Development Party		Justice and Development Party		Justice and Development Party
Bursa		Justice and Development Party		Justice and Development Party		Justice and Development Party
Çanakkale		Justice and Development Party		Justice and Development Party		Justice and Development Party
Çankırı		Justice and Development Party		Justice and Development Party		Justice and Development Party
Çorum		Justice and Development Party		Justice and Development Party		Justice and Development Party
Denizli		Justice and Development Party		Justice and Development Party		Justice and Development Party
Diyarbakır		Democratic People's Party		Independent		Independent
Düzce		Justice and Development Party		Justice and Development Party		Justice and Development Party
Edirne		Republican People's Party		Republican People's Party		Republican People's Party
Elazığ		Justice and Development Party		Justice and Development Party		Justice and Development Party
Erzincan		Justice and Development Party		Justice and Development Party		Justice and Development Party
Erzurum		Justice and Development Party		Justice and Development Party		Justice and Development Party
Eskişehir		Justice and Development Party		Justice and Development Party		Justice and Development Party
Gaziantep		Justice and Development Party		Justice and Development Party		Justice and Development Party
Giresun		Justice and Development Party		Justice and Development Party		Justice and Development Party
Gümüşhane		Justice and Development Party		Justice and Development Party		Justice and Development Party
Hakkari		Democratic People's Party		Independent		Independent
Hatay		Justice and Development Party		Justice and Development Party		Justice and Development Party
Iğdır		Democratic People's Party		Independent		Nationalist Movement Party
Isparta		Justice and Development Party		Justice and Development Party		Justice and Development Party
Istanbul		Justice and Development Party		Justice and Development Party		Justice and Development Party
İzmir		Republican People's Party		Republican People's Party		Republican People's Party
Kahramanmaraş		Justice and Development Party		Justice and Development Party		Justice and Development Party
Karabük		Justice and Development Party		Justice and Development Party		Justice and Development Party
Karaman		Justice and Development Party		Justice and Development Party		Justice and Development Party
Kars		Democratic People's Party		Justice and Development Party		Justice and Development Party
Kastamonu		Justice and Development Party		Justice and Development Party		Justice and Development Party
Kayseri		Justice and Development Party		Justice and Development Party		Justice and Development Party
Kilis		Justice and Development Party		Justice and Development Party		Justice and Development Party
Kırıkkale		Justice and Development Party		Justice and Development Party		Justice and Development Party
Kırklareli		Republican People's Party		Republican People's Party		Republican People's Party
Kırşehir		Justice and Development Party		Justice and Development Party		Justice and Development Party
Kocaeli		Justice and Development Party		Justice and Development Party		Justice and Development Party
Konya		Justice and Development Party		Justice and Development Party		Justice and Development Party
Kütahya		Justice and Development Party		Justice and Development Party		Justice and Development Party
Malatya		Justice and Development Party		Justice and Development Party		Justice and Development Party
Manisa		Justice and Development Party		Justice and Development Party		Justice and Development Party
Mardin		Democratic People's Party		Justice and Development Party		Independent
Mersin		Republican People's Party		Nationalist Movement Party		Justice and Development Party
Muğla		Republican People's Party		Republican People's Party		Republican People's Party
Muş		Democratic People's Party		Independent		Independent
Nevşehir		Justice and Development Party		Justice and Development Party		Justice and Development Party
Niğde		Justice and Development Party		Justice and Development Party		Justice and Development Party
Ordu		Justice and Development Party		Justice and Development Party		Justice and Development Party
Osmaniye		Justice and Development Party		Nationalist Movement Party		Justice and Development Party
Rize		Justice and Development Party		Justice and Development Party		Justice and Development Party
Sakarya		Justice and Development Party		Justice and Development Party		Justice and Development Party
Samsun		Justice and Development Party		Justice and Development Party		Justice and Development Party
Siirt		Democratic People's Party		Justice and Development Party		Justice and Development Party
Sinop		Justice and Development Party		Justice and Development Party		Justice and Development Party
Sivas		Justice and Development Party		Justice and Development Party		Justice and Development Party
Şanlıurfa		Justice and Development Party		Justice and Development Party		Justice and Development Party
Şırnak		Democratic People's Party		Independent		Independent
Tekirdağ		Republican People's Party		Republican People's Party		Republican People's Party
Tokat		Justice and Development Party		Justice and Development Party		Justice and Development Party
Trabzon		Justice and Development Party		Justice and Development Party		Justice and Development Party
Tunceli		Democratic People's Party		Independent		Republican People's Party
Uşak		Republican People's Party		Justice and Development Party		Justice and Development Party
Van		Democratic People's Party		Justice and Development Party		Independent
Yalova		Justice and Development Party		Justice and Development Party		Justice and Development Party
Yozgat		Justice and Development Party		Justice and Development Party		Justice and Development Party
Zonguldak		Justice and Development Party		Justice and Development Party		Justice and Development Party

Abb.	Party	2002 election	2007 election	2011 election
AKP	Justice and Development Party	56 provinces	68 provinces	66 provinces
DEHAP	Democratic People's Party / Independents	13 provinces	6 provinces	7 provinces
CHP	Republican People's Party	11 provinces	5 provinces	7 provinces
MHP	Nationalist Movement Party	0 provinces	2 provinces	1 provinces

== Results by provinces ==
=== Adana ===
Popular vote received by the Justice and Development Party (AKP)

Popular vote received by the Republican People's Party (CHP)

Party	Vicinity vote	Customs vote	Total vote
Justice and Development Party	436,705	1,616	438,321
Democratic Party	6,420	16	6,436
Republican People's Party	360,460	1,087	361,547
Labour Party	0	0	0
Nation Party	2,176	2	2,178
Liberal Democratic Party	331	1	332
Felicity Party	11,038	40	11,078
Rights and Equality Party	2,177	6	2,183
People's Voice Party	5,259	6	5,265
Nationalist Movement Party	237,692	448	238,140
True Path Party	2,050	5	2,055
Communist Party of Turkey	1,317	5	1,322
Nationalist and Conservative Party	854	2	856
Great Union Party	6,876	9	6,885
Democratic Left Party	2,140	4	2,144

=== Adıyaman ===
Party	Vicinity vote	Customs vote	Total vote
Justice and Development Party	205,209	759	205,968
Democratic Party	911	2	913
Republican People's Party	50,615	153	50,768
Labour Party	0	0	0
Nation Party	324	0	324
Liberal Democratic Party	87	0	87
Felicity Party	2,102	8	2,110
Rights and Equality Party	0	0	0
People's Voice Party	7,556	8	7,564
Nationalist Movement Party	14,075	27	14,102
True Path Party	233	1	234
Communist Party of Turkey	368	1	369
Nationalist and Conservative Party	253	1	254
Great Union Party	2,839	4	2,843
Democratic Left Party	462	1	463

=== Afyonkarahisar ===
Party	Vicinity vote	Customs vote	Total vote
Justice and Development Party	256,514	949	257,463
Democratic Party	3,096	8	3,104
Republican People's Party	69,992	211	70,203
Labour Party	709	8	717
Nation Party	635	1	636
Liberal Democratic Party	0	0	0
Felicity Party	4,807	18	4,825
Rights and Equality Party	801	2	803
People's Voice Party	2,749	3	2,752
Nationalist Movement Party	79,276	149	79,425
True Path Party	1,296	3	1,299
Communist Party of Turkey	355	1	356
Nationalist and Conservative Party	558	1	559
Great Union Party	2,923	4	2,927
Democratic Left Party	821	2	823

=== Ağrı ===
Party	Vicinity vote	Customs vote	Total vote
Justice and Development Party	96,260	356	96,616
Democratic Party	889	2	891
Republican People's Party	4,489	14	4,503
Labour Party	0	0	0
Nation Party	245	0	245
Liberal Democratic Party	0	0	0
Felicity Party	1,049	4	1,053
Rights and Equality Party	0	0	0
People's Voice Party	1,140	1	1,141
Nationalist Movement Party	4,497	8	4,505
True Path Party	272	1	273
Communist Party of Turkey	687	2	689
Nationalist and Conservative Party	282	1	283
Great Union Party	3,531	5	3,536
Democratic Left Party	1,060	2	1,062

=== Aksaray ===
Party	Vicinity vote	Customs vote	Total vote
Justice and Development Party	131,967	488	132,455
Democratic Party	1,069	3	1,072
Republican People's Party	23,423	71	23,494
Labour Party	258	3	261
Nation Party	202	0	202
Liberal Democratic Party	60	0	60
Felicity Party	1,816	7	1,823
Rights and Equality Party	233	1	234
People's Voice Party	1,536	2	1,538
Nationalist Movement Party	35,962	68	36,030
True Path Party	390	1	391
Communist Party of Turkey	138	0	138
Nationalist and Conservative Party	220	1	221
Great Union Party	2,082	3	2,085
Democratic Left Party	302	1	303

=== Amasya ===
Party	Vicinity vote	Customs vote	Total vote
Justice and Development Party	110,052	407	110,459
Democratic Party	1,418	4	1,422
Republican People's Party	58,888	178	59,066
Labour Party	428	5	433
Nation Party	116	0	116
Liberal Democratic Party	62	0	62
Felicity Party	2,922	11	2,933
Rights and Equality Party	220	1	221
People's Voice Party	1,738	2	1,740
Nationalist Movement Party	31,741	60	31,801
True Path Party	398	1	399
Communist Party of Turkey	136	0	136
Nationalist and Conservative Party	244	1	245
Great Union Party	2,327	3	2,330
Democratic Left Party	271	1	272

=== Ankara ===
==== Region 1 ====
Party	Vicinity vote	Customs vote	Total vote
Justice and Development Party	690,857	2,556	693,413
Democratic Party	6,157	16	6,173
Republican People's Party	549,054	1,656	550,710
Labour Party	0	0	0
Nation Party	2,198	2	2,200
Liberal Democratic Party	579	2	581
Felicity Party	9,388	34	9,422
Rights and Equality Party	3,578	10	3,588
People's Voice Party	11,027	12	11,039
Nationalist Movement Party	228,395	430	228,825
True Path Party	1,581	4	1,585
Communist Party of Turkey	2,441	8	2,449
Nationalist and Conservative Party	819	2	821
Great Union Party	15,568	21	15,589
Democratic Left Party	2,688	5	2,693

==== Region 2 ====
Party	Vicinity vote	Customs vote	Total vote
Justice and Development Party	775,589	2,869	778,458
Democratic Party	6,833	17	6,850
Republican People's Party	383,820	1,158	384,978
Labour Party	0	0	0
Nation Party	2,051	2	2,053
Liberal Democratic Party	338	1	339
Felicity Party	10,813	40	10,853
Rights and Equality Party	3,114	8	3,122
People's Voice Party	11,259	12	11,271
Nationalist Movement Party	207,667	391	208,058
True Path Party	1,538	4	1,542
Communist Party of Turkey	1,834	6	1,840
Nationalist and Conservative Party	949	2	951
Great Union Party	17,550	23	17,573
Democratic Left Party	2,214	4	2,218

=== Antalya ===
Party	Vicinity vote	Customs vote	Total vote
Justice and Development Party	461,257	1,706	462,963
Democratic Party	9,752	25	9,777
Republican People's Party	390,223	1,177	391,400
Labour Party	0	0	0
Nation Party	2,635	2	2,637
Liberal Democratic Party	545	2	547
Felicity Party	9,498	35	9,533
Rights and Equality Party	4,280	11	4,291
People's Voice Party	7,073	8	7,081
Nationalist Movement Party	245,439	462	245,901
True Path Party	3,386	8	3,394
Communist Party of Turkey	1,678	6	1,684
Nationalist and Conservative Party	1,506	4	1,510
Great Union Party	6,227	8	6,235
Democratic Left Party	2,944	5	2,949

=== Ardahan ===
Party	Vicinity vote	Customs vote	Total vote
Justice and Development Party	22,747	84	22,831
Democratic Party	438	1	439
Republican People's Party	17,423	53	17,476
Labour Party	0	0	0
Nation Party	186	0	186
Liberal Democratic Party	45	0	45
Felicity Party	258	1	259
Rights and Equality Party	0	0	0
People's Voice Party	309	0	309
Nationalist Movement Party	5,640	11	5,651
True Path Party	128	0	128
Communist Party of Turkey	196	1	197
Nationalist and Conservative Party	101	0	101
Great Union Party	1,664	2	1,666
Democratic Left Party	394	1	395

=== Artvin ===
Party	Vicinity vote	Customs vote	Total vote
Justice and Development Party	48,589	180	48,769
Democratic Party	1,604	4	1,608
Republican People's Party	37,068	112	37,180
Labour Party	323	4	327
Nation Party	108	0	108
Liberal Democratic Party	88	0	88
Felicity Party	1,233	5	1,238
Rights and Equality Party	0	0	0
People's Voice Party	495	1	496
Nationalist Movement Party	13,944	26	13,970
True Path Party	385	1	386
Communist Party of Turkey	172	1	173
Nationalist and Conservative Party	118	0	118
Great Union Party	251	0	251
Democratic Left Party	232	0	232

=== Aydın ===
Party	Vicinity vote	Customs vote	Total vote
Justice and Development Party	223,503	827	224,330
Democratic Party	7,114	18	7,132
Republican People's Party	240,337	725	241,062
Labour Party	0	0	0
Nation Party	1,794	1	1,795
Liberal Democratic Party	344	1	345
Felicity Party	3,118	11	3,129
Rights and Equality Party	2,759	7	2,766
People's Voice Party	2,849	3	2,852
Nationalist Movement Party	114,871	216	115,087
True Path Party	2,043	5	2,048
Communist Party of Turkey	849	3	852
Nationalist and Conservative Party	1,090	3	1,093
Great Union Party	3,611	5	3,616
Democratic Left Party	2,181	4	2,185

=== Balıkesir ===
Party	Vicinity vote	Customs vote	Total vote
Justice and Development Party	355,334	1,315	356,649
Democratic Party	9,122	23	9,145
Republican People's Party	258,325	779	259,104
Labour Party	2,089	24	2,113
Nation Party	678	1	679
Liberal Democratic Party	439	2	441
Felicity Party	8,692	32	8,724
Rights and Equality Party	2,497	7	2,504
People's Voice Party	4,578	5	4,583
Nationalist Movement Party	106,462	201	106,663
True Path Party	2,459	6	2,465
Communist Party of Turkey	918	3	921
Nationalist and Conservative Party	825	2	827
Great Union Party	2,883	4	2,887
Democratic Left Party	2,443	5	2,448

=== Bartın ===
Party	Vicinity vote	Customs vote	Total vote
Justice and Development Party	57,570	213	57,783
Democratic Party	1,155	3	1,158
Republican People's Party	34,395	104	34,499
Labour Party	412	5	417
Nation Party	251	0	251
Liberal Democratic Party	194	1	195
Felicity Party	2,940	11	2,951
Rights and Equality Party	383	1	384
People's Voice Party	1,200	1	1,201
Nationalist Movement Party	19,153	36	19,189
True Path Party	422	1	423
Communist Party of Turkey	205	1	206
Nationalist and Conservative Party	211	1	212
Great Union Party	392	1	393
Democratic Left Party	700	1	701

=== Batman ===
Party	Vicinity vote	Customs vote	Total vote
Justice and Development Party	81,477	301	81,778
Democratic Party	928	2	930
Republican People's Party	14,710	44	14,754
Labour Party	0	0	0
Nation Party	155	0	155
Liberal Democratic Party	166	1	167
Felicity Party	2,148	8	2,156
Rights and Equality Party	0	0	0
People's Voice Party	872	1	873
Nationalist Movement Party	1,279	2	1,281
True Path Party	188	0	188
Communist Party of Turkey	458	2	460
Nationalist and Conservative Party	112	0	112
Great Union Party	3,278	4	3,282
Democratic Left Party	719	1	720

=== Bayburt ===
Party	Vicinity vote	Customs vote	Total vote
Justice and Development Party	27,217	101	27,318
Democratic Party	560	1	561
Republican People's Party	1,671	5	1,676
Labour Party	29	0	29
Nation Party	14	0	14
Liberal Democratic Party	15	0	15
Felicity Party	2,026	7	2,033
Rights and Equality Party	0	0	0
People's Voice Party	596	1	597
Nationalist Movement Party	10,414	20	10,434
True Path Party	100	0	100
Communist Party of Turkey	27	0	27
Nationalist and Conservative Party	67	0	67
Great Union Party	201	0	201
Democratic Left Party	26	0	26

=== Bilecik ===
Party	Vicinity vote	Customs vote	Total vote
Justice and Development Party	54,734	202	54,936
Democratic Party	964	2	966
Republican People's Party	32,643	98	32,741
Labour Party	299	3	302
Nation Party	127	0	127
Liberal Democratic Party	63	0	63
Felicity Party	1,767	6	1,773
Rights and Equality Party	338	1	339
People's Voice Party	1,347	1	1,348
Nationalist Movement Party	35,051	66	35,117
True Path Party	361	1	362
Communist Party of Turkey	127	0	127
Nationalist and Conservative Party	146	0	146
Great Union Party	386	1	387
Democratic Left Party	251	0	251

=== Bingöl ===
Party	Vicinity vote	Customs vote	Total vote
Justice and Development Party	84,575	313	84,888
Democratic Party	479	1	480
Republican People's Party	3,878	12	3,890
Labour Party	0	0	0
Nation Party	52	0	52
Liberal Democratic Party	0	0	0
Felicity Party	985	4	989
Rights and Equality Party	0	0	0
People's Voice Party	1,601	2	1,603
Nationalist Movement Party	1,674	3	1,677
True Path Party	87	0	87
Communist Party of Turkey	299	1	300
Nationalist and Conservative Party	62	0	62
Great Union Party	1,463	2	1,465
Democratic Left Party	820	2	822

=== Bitlis ===
Party	Vicinity vote	Customs vote	Total vote
Justice and Development Party	73,785	273	74,058
Democratic Party	582	1	583
Republican People's Party	2,503	8	2,511
Labour Party	0	0	0
Nation Party	72	0	72
Liberal Democratic Party	0	0	0
Felicity Party	793	3	796
Rights and Equality Party	0	0	0
People's Voice Party	1,107	1	1,108
Nationalist Movement Party	4,632	9	4,641
True Path Party	124	0	124
Communist Party of Turkey	415	1	416
Nationalist and Conservative Party	106	0	106
Great Union Party	1,983	3	1,986
Democratic Left Party	927	2	929

=== Bolu ===
Party	Vicinity vote	Customs vote	Total vote
Justice and Development Party	103,525	383	103,908
Democratic Party	1,843	5	1,848
Republican People's Party	35,504	107	35,611
Labour Party	397	5	402
Nation Party	171	0	171
Liberal Democratic Party	131	1	132
Felicity Party	2,694	10	2,704
Rights and Equality Party	724	2	726
People's Voice Party	1,322	1	1,323
Nationalist Movement Party	28,537	54	28,591
True Path Party	496	1	497
Communist Party of Turkey	166	1	167
Nationalist and Conservative Party	200	1	201
Great Union Party	928	1	929
Democratic Left Party	402	1	403

=== Burdur ===
Party	Vicinity vote	Customs vote	Total vote
Justice and Development Party	81,281	301	81,582
Democratic Party	1,482	4	1,486
Republican People's Party	42,187	127	42,314
Labour Party	422	5	427
Nation Party	280	0	280
Liberal Democratic Party	143	1	144
Felicity Party	2,906	11	2,917
Rights and Equality Party	1,045	3	1,048
People's Voice Party	2,016	2	2,018
Nationalist Movement Party	30,975	58	31,033
True Path Party	602	1	603
Communist Party of Turkey	188	1	189
Nationalist and Conservative Party	286	1	287
Great Union Party	1,383	2	1,385
Democratic Left Party	710	1	711

=== Bursa ===
Party	Vicinity vote	Customs vote	Total vote
Justice and Development Party	872,153	3,227	875,380
Democratic Party	14,508	37	14,545
Republican People's Party	411,645	1,242	412,887
Labour Party	0	0	0
Nation Party	3,269	2	3,271
Liberal Democratic Party	778	3	781
Felicity Party	32,500	119	32,619
Rights and Equality Party	10,838	29	10,867
People's Voice Party	15,128	17	15,145
Nationalist Movement Party	237,689	448	238,137
True Path Party	3,683	9	3,692
Communist Party of Turkey	1,855	6	1,861
Nationalist and Conservative Party	1,670	4	1,674
Great Union Party	9,584	13	9,597
Democratic Left Party	4,879	9	4,888

=== Çanakkale ===
Party	Vicinity vote	Customs vote	Total vote
Justice and Development Party	135,864	503	136,367
Democratic Party	3,926	10	3,936
Republican People's Party	129,056	389	129,445
Labour Party	1,692	19	1,711
Nation Party	323	0	323
Liberal Democratic Party	191	1	192
Felicity Party	1,580	6	1,586
Rights and Equality Party	1,258	3	1,261
People's Voice Party	1,525	2	1,527
Nationalist Movement Party	47,807	90	47,897
True Path Party	1,076	3	1,079
Communist Party of Turkey	437	2	439
Nationalist and Conservative Party	330	1	331
Great Union Party	739	1	740
Democratic Left Party	1,013	2	1,015

=== Çankırı ===
Party	Vicinity vote	Customs vote	Total vote
Justice and Development Party	72,481	268	72,749
Democratic Party	968	2	970
Republican People's Party	6,718	20	6,738
Labour Party	116	1	117
Nation Party	58	0	58
Liberal Democratic Party	40	0	40
Felicity Party	1,577	6	1,583
Rights and Equality Party	197	0	197
People's Voice Party	959	1	960
Nationalist Movement Party	25,559	48	25,607
True Path Party	362	1	363
Communist Party of Turkey	93	0	93
Nationalist and Conservative Party	189	1	190
Great Union Party	1,119	1	1,120
Democratic Left Party	125	0	125

=== Çorum ===
Party	Vicinity vote	Customs vote	Total vote
Justice and Development Party	208,991	773	209,764
Democratic Party	1,875	5	1,880
Republican People's Party	82,017	247	82,264
Labour Party	717	8	725
Nation Party	239	0	239
Liberal Democratic Party	0	0	0
Felicity Party	3,506	13	3,519
Rights and Equality Party	0	0	0
People's Voice Party	2,417	3	2,420
Nationalist Movement Party	37,050	70	37,120
True Path Party	529	1	530
Communist Party of Turkey	318	1	319
Nationalist and Conservative Party	270	1	271
Great Union Party	2,874	4	2,878
Democratic Left Party	437	1	438

=== Denizli ===
Party	Vicinity vote	Customs vote	Total vote
Justice and Development Party	278,062	1,029	279,091
Democratic Party	5,862	15	5,877
Republican People's Party	186,455	562	187,017
Labour Party	1,639	19	1,658
Nation Party	691	1	692
Liberal Democratic Party	380	1	381
Felicity Party	2,858	10	2,868
Rights and Equality Party	2,554	7	2,561
People's Voice Party	3,159	3	3,162
Nationalist Movement Party	101,217	191	101,408
True Path Party	1,769	4	1,773
Communist Party of Turkey	705	2	707
Nationalist and Conservative Party	0	0	0
Great Union Party	3,816	5	3,821
Democratic Left Party	1,750	3	1,753

=== Diyarbakır ===
Party	Vicinity vote	Customs vote	Total vote
Justice and Development Party	217,746	806	218,552
Democratic Party	1,980	5	1,985
Republican People's Party	15,834	48	15,882
Labour Party	0	0	0
Nation Party	740	1	741
Liberal Democratic Party	0	0	0
Felicity Party	2,930	11	2,941
Rights and Equality Party	0	0	0
People's Voice Party	3,450	4	3,454
Nationalist Movement Party	5,722	11	5,733
True Path Party	703	2	705
Communist Party of Turkey	1,430	5	1,435
Nationalist and Conservative Party	570	1	571
Great Union Party	6,990	9	6,999
Democratic Left Party	1,269	2	1,271

=== Düzce ===
Party	Vicinity vote	Customs vote	Total vote
Justice and Development Party	140,661	520	141,181
Democratic Party	1,341	3	1,344
Republican People's Party	26,498	80	26,578
Labour Party	349	4	353
Nation Party	141	0	141
Liberal Democratic Party	112	0	112
Felicity Party	3,818	14	3,832
Rights and Equality Party	290	1	291
People's Voice Party	3,003	3	3,006
Nationalist Movement Party	34,711	65	34,776
True Path Party	428	1	429
Communist Party of Turkey	207	1	208
Nationalist and Conservative Party	173	0	173
Great Union Party	1,172	2	1,174
Democratic Left Party	478	1	479

=== Edirne ===
Party	Vicinity vote	Customs vote	Total vote
Justice and Development Party	79,955	296	80,251
Democratic Party	2,480	6	2,486
Republican People's Party	136,121	411	136,532
Labour Party	1,038	12	1,050
Nation Party	351	0	351
Liberal Democratic Party	143	1	144
Felicity Party	2,408	9	2,417
Rights and Equality Party	1,377	4	1,381
People's Voice Party	1,083	1	1,084
Nationalist Movement Party	35,086	66	35,152
True Path Party	678	2	680
Communist Party of Turkey	429	1	430
Nationalist and Conservative Party	266	1	267
Great Union Party	406	1	407
Democratic Left Party	1,186	2	1,188

=== Elazığ ===
Party	Vicinity vote	Customs vote	Total vote
Justice and Development Party	212,719	787	213,506
Democratic Party	1,159	3	1,162
Republican People's Party	41,616	126	41,742
Labour Party	0	0	0
Nation Party	301	0	301
Liberal Democratic Party	0	0	0
Felicity Party	7,143	26	7,169
Rights and Equality Party	414	1	415
People's Voice Party	3,468	4	3,472
Nationalist Movement Party	45,703	86	45,789
True Path Party	375	1	376
Communist Party of Turkey	223	1	224
Nationalist and Conservative Party	219	1	220
Great Union Party	2,114	3	2,117
Democratic Left Party	240	0	240

=== Erzincan ===
Party	Vicinity vote	Customs vote	Total vote
Justice and Development Party	72,957	270	73,227
Democratic Party	575	1	576
Republican People's Party	38,804	117	38,921
Labour Party	308	4	312
Nation Party	28	0	28
Liberal Democratic Party	22	0	22
Felicity Party	1,140	4	1,144
Rights and Equality Party	0	0	0
People's Voice Party	747	1	748
Nationalist Movement Party	11,916	22	11,938
True Path Party	138	0	138
Communist Party of Turkey	105	0	105
Nationalist and Conservative Party	101	0	101
Great Union Party	901	1	902
Democratic Left Party	101	0	101

=== Erzurum ===
Party	Vicinity vote	Customs vote	Total vote
Justice and Development Party	282,593	1,045	283,638
Democratic Party	1,735	4	1,739
Republican People's Party	19,787	60	19,847
Labour Party	0	0	0
Nation Party	251	0	251
Liberal Democratic Party	0	0	0
Felicity Party	6,552	24	6,576
Rights and Equality Party	488	1	489
People's Voice Party	3,064	3	3,067
Nationalist Movement Party	54,419	103	54,522
True Path Party	602	1	603
Communist Party of Turkey	429	1	430
Nationalist and Conservative Party	287	1	288
Great Union Party	3,607	5	3,612
Democratic Left Party	1,308	2	1,310

=== Eskişehir ===
Party	Vicinity vote	Customs vote	Total vote
Justice and Development Party	221,435	819	222,254
Democratic Party	5,386	14	5,400
Republican People's Party	178,533	539	179,072
Labour Party	1,251	14	1,265
Nation Party	551	1	552
Liberal Democratic Party	216	1	217
Felicity Party	4,536	17	4,553
Rights and Equality Party	2,594	7	2,601
People's Voice Party	4,197	5	4,202
Nationalist Movement Party	73,471	138	73,609
True Path Party	0	0	0
Communist Party of Turkey	794	3	797
Nationalist and Conservative Party	518	1	519
Great Union Party	3,617	5	3,622
Democratic Left Party	2,532	5	2,537

=== Gaziantep ===
Party	Vicinity vote	Customs vote	Total vote
Justice and Development Party	509,040	1,883	510,923
Democratic Party	5,328	13	5,341
Republican People's Party	159,480	481	159,961
Labour Party	0	0	0
Nation Party	1,187	1	1,188
Liberal Democratic Party	0	0	0
Felicity Party	8,240	30	8,270
Rights and Equality Party	1,552	4	1,556
People's Voice Party	6,772	7	6,779
Nationalist Movement Party	77,690	146	77,836
True Path Party	0	0	0
Communist Party of Turkey	1,331	5	1,336
Nationalist and Conservative Party	527	1	528
Great Union Party	7,818	10	7,828
Democratic Left Party	2,081	4	2,085

=== Giresun ===
Party	Vicinity vote	Customs vote	Total vote
Justice and Development Party	153,816	569	154,385
Democratic Party	1,948	5	1,953
Republican People's Party	61,394	185	61,579
Labour Party	519	6	525
Nation Party	194	0	194
Liberal Democratic Party	143	1	144
Felicity Party	4,313	16	4,329
Rights and Equality Party	594	2	596
People's Voice Party	2,573	3	2,576
Nationalist Movement Party	30,908	58	30,966
True Path Party	517	1	518
Communist Party of Turkey	254	1	255
Nationalist and Conservative Party	284	1	285
Great Union Party	1,125	2	1,127
Democratic Left Party	558	1	559

=== Gümüşhane ===
Party	Vicinity vote	Customs vote	Total vote
Justice and Development Party	45,036	167	45,203
Democratic Party	443	1	444
Republican People's Party	5,385	16	5,401
Labour Party	85	1	86
Nation Party	51	0	51
Liberal Democratic Party	24	0	24
Felicity Party	1,697	6	1,703
Rights and Equality Party	0	0	0
People's Voice Party	646	1	647
Nationalist Movement Party	14,976	28	15,004
True Path Party	189	0	189
Communist Party of Turkey	81	0	81
Nationalist and Conservative Party	99	0	99
Great Union Party	506	1	507
Democratic Left Party	55	0	55

=== Hakkari ===
Party	Vicinity vote	Customs vote	Total vote
Justice and Development Party	19,465	72	19,537
Democratic Party	227	1	228
Republican People's Party	1,065	3	1,068
Labour Party	0	0	0
Nation Party	41	0	41
Liberal Democratic Party	18	0	18
Felicity Party	168	1	169
Rights and Equality Party	0	0	0
People's Voice Party	242	0	242
Nationalist Movement Party	1,224	2	1,226
True Path Party	54	0	54
Communist Party of Turkey	176	1	177
Nationalist and Conservative Party	77	0	77
Great Union Party	853	1	854
Democratic Left Party	242	0	242

=== Hatay ===
Party	Vicinity vote	Customs vote	Total vote
Justice and Development Party	352,313	1,303	353,616
Democratic Party	4,330	11	4,341
Republican People's Party	305,576	922	306,498
Labour Party	1,413	16	1,429
Nation Party	365	0	365
Liberal Democratic Party	0	0	0
Felicity Party	5,919	22	5,941
Rights and Equality Party	1,719	5	1,724
People's Voice Party	2,957	3	2,960
Nationalist Movement Party	100,310	189	100,499
True Path Party	1,082	3	1,085
Communist Party of Turkey	688	2	690
Nationalist and Conservative Party	570	1	571
Great Union Party	3,226	4	3,230
Democratic Left Party	873	2	875

=== Iğdır ===
Party	Vicinity vote	Customs vote	Total vote
Justice and Development Party	22,776	84	22,860
Democratic Party	252	1	253
Republican People's Party	1,370	4	1,374
Labour Party	0	0	0
Nation Party	53	0	53
Liberal Democratic Party	24	0	24
Felicity Party	172	1	173
Rights and Equality Party	78	0	78
People's Voice Party	290	0	290
Nationalist Movement Party	27,502	52	27,554
True Path Party	226	0	226
Communist Party of Turkey	253	1	254
Nationalist and Conservative Party	104	0	104
Great Union Party	1,220	2	1,222
Democratic Left Party	912	2	914

=== Isparta ===
Party	Vicinity vote	Customs vote	Total vote
Justice and Development Party	134,936	499	135,435
Democratic Party	3,736	9	3,745
Republican People's Party	55,427	167	55,594
Labour Party	524	6	530
Nation Party	263	0	263
Liberal Democratic Party	118	1	119
Felicity Party	3,260	12	3,272
Rights and Equality Party	732	2	734
People's Voice Party	2,617	3	2,620
Nationalist Movement Party	48,321	91	48,412
True Path Party	1,244	3	1,247
Communist Party of Turkey	245	1	246
Nationalist and Conservative Party	255	1	256
Great Union Party	2,112	3	2,115
Democratic Left Party	452	1	453

=== İstanbul ===
==== Region 1 ====
Party	Vicinity vote	Customs vote	Total vote
Justice and Development Party	1,386,429	5,129	1,391,558
Democratic Party	10,729	27	10,756
Republican People's Party	966,124	2,914	969,038
Labour Party	0	0	0
Nation Party	4,807	4	4,811
Liberal Democratic Party	1,066	4	1,070
Felicity Party	44,228	162	44,390
Rights and Equality Party	11,063	30	11,093
People's Voice Party	21,317	24	21,341
Nationalist Movement Party	260,335	490	260,825
True Path Party	2,752	7	2,759
Communist Party of Turkey	5,709	20	5,729
Nationalist and Conservative Party	1,294	3	1,297
Great Union Party	18,409	25	18,434
Democratic Left Party	5,921	11	5,932

==== Region 2 ====
Party	Vicinity vote	Customs vote	Total vote
Justice and Development Party	1,269,131	4,695	1,273,826
Democratic Party	10,646	27	10,673
Republican People's Party	731,182	2,206	733,388
Labour Party	0	0	0
Nation Party	4,187	3	4,190
Liberal Democratic Party	1,144	4	1,148
Felicity Party	49,158	180	49,338
Rights and Equality Party	10,555	28	10,583
People's Voice Party	18,111	20	18,131
Nationalist Movement Party	228,954	431	229,385
True Path Party	0	0	0
Communist Party of Turkey	4,693	16	4,709
Nationalist and Conservative Party	1,230	3	1,233
Great Union Party	16,072	22	16,094
Democratic Left Party	7,547	14	7,561

==== Region 3 ====
Party	Vicinity vote	Customs vote	Total vote
Justice and Development Party	1,261,160	4,666	1,265,826
Democratic Party	11,663	30	11,693
Republican People's Party	788,107	2,377	790,484
Labour Party	0	0	0
Nation Party	5,826	4	5,830
Liberal Democratic Party	1,142	4	1,146
Felicity Party	35,173	129	35,302
Rights and Equality Party	11,034	30	11,064
People's Voice Party	17,907	20	17,927
Nationalist Movement Party	256,972	484	257,456
True Path Party	0	0	0
Communist Party of Turkey	6,167	21	6,188
Nationalist and Conservative Party	1,787	4	1,791
Great Union Party	15,474	21	15,495
Democratic Left Party	5,985	11	5,996

=== İzmir ===
==== Region 1 ====
Party	Vicinity vote	Customs vote	Total vote
Justice and Development Party	452,715	1,675	454,390
Democratic Party	7,432	19	7,451
Republican People's Party	526,413	1,588	528,001
Labour Party	0	0	0
Nation Party	2,321	2	2,323
Liberal Democratic Party	414	2	416
Felicity Party	5,588	21	5,609
Rights and Equality Party	8,926	24	8,950
People's Voice Party	3,438	4	3,442
Nationalist Movement Party	134,220	253	134,473
True Path Party	1,512	4	1,516
Communist Party of Turkey	2,184	8	2,192
Nationalist and Conservative Party	978	2	980
Great Union Party	4,356	6	4,362
Democratic Left Party	3,199	6	3,205

==== Region 2 ====
Party	Vicinity vote	Customs vote	Total vote
Justice and Development Party	468,159	1,732	469,891
Democratic Party	11,025	28	11,053
Republican People's Party	568,171	1,714	569,885
Labour Party	0	0	0
Nation Party	3,132	2	3,134
Liberal Democratic Party	657	2	659
Felicity Party	5,756	21	5,777
Rights and Equality Party	8,074	22	8,096
People's Voice Party	4,142	5	4,147
Nationalist Movement Party	148,837	280	149,117
True Path Party	2,641	6	2,647
Communist Party of Turkey	2,003	7	2,010
Nationalist and Conservative Party	847	2	849
Great Union Party	3,995	5	4,000
Democratic Left Party	3,742	7	3,749

=== Kahramanmaraş ===
Party	Vicinity vote	Customs vote	Total vote
Justice and Development Party	390,541	1,445	391,986
Democratic Party	2,934	7	2,941
Republican People's Party	64,390	194	64,584
Labour Party	571	7	578
Nation Party	261	0	261
Liberal Democratic Party	0	0	0
Felicity Party	7,347	27	7,374
Rights and Equality Party	767	2	769
People's Voice Party	5,233	6	5,239
Nationalist Movement Party	73,013	138	73,151
True Path Party	848	2	850
Communist Party of Turkey	413	1	414
Nationalist and Conservative Party	523	1	524
Great Union Party	11,088	15	11,103
Democratic Left Party	628	1	629

=== Karabük ===
Party	Vicinity vote	Customs vote	Total vote
Justice and Development Party	81,838	303	82,141
Democratic Party	1,810	5	1,815
Republican People's Party	26,900	81	26,981
Labour Party	301	3	304
Nation Party	139	0	139
Liberal Democratic Party	135	1	136
Felicity Party	3,369	12	3,381
Rights and Equality Party	341	1	342
People's Voice Party	2,405	3	2,408
Nationalist Movement Party	22,032	42	22,074
True Path Party	427	1	428
Communist Party of Turkey	193	1	194
Nationalist and Conservative Party	149	0	149
Great Union Party	832	1	833
Democratic Left Party	456	1	457

=== Karaman ===
Party	Vicinity vote	Customs vote	Total vote
Justice and Development Party	80,158	297	80,455
Democratic Party	833	2	835
Republican People's Party	26,431	80	26,511
Labour Party	289	3	292
Nation Party	138	0	138
Liberal Democratic Party	107	0	107
Felicity Party	2,697	10	2,707
Rights and Equality Party	350	1	351
People's Voice Party	1,453	2	1,455
Nationalist Movement Party	25,594	48	25,642
True Path Party	311	1	312
Communist Party of Turkey	164	1	165
Nationalist and Conservative Party	169	0	169
Great Union Party	993	1	994
Democratic Left Party	308	1	309

=== Kars ===
Party	Vicinity vote	Customs vote	Total vote
Justice and Development Party	60,970	226	61,196
Democratic Party	681	2	683
Republican People's Party	23,937	72	24,009
Labour Party	0	0	0
Nation Party	205	0	205
Liberal Democratic Party	65	0	65
Felicity Party	628	2	630
Rights and Equality Party	178	0	178
People's Voice Party	934	1	935
Nationalist Movement Party	24,697	47	24,744
True Path Party	278	1	279
Communist Party of Turkey	398	1	399
Nationalist and Conservative Party	165	0	165
Great Union Party	1,645	2	1,647
Democratic Left Party	1,025	2	1,027

=== Kastamonu ===
Party	Vicinity vote	Customs vote	Total vote
Justice and Development Party	129,656	480	130,136
Democratic Party	3,102	8	3,110
Republican People's Party	34,065	103	34,168
Labour Party	535	6	541
Nation Party	395	0	395
Liberal Democratic Party	280	1	281
Felicity Party	1,911	7	1,918
Rights and Equality Party	918	2	920
People's Voice Party	4,010	4	4,014
Nationalist Movement Party	53,646	101	53,747
True Path Party	994	2	996
Communist Party of Turkey	292	1	293
Nationalist and Conservative Party	384	1	385
Great Union Party	1,181	2	1,183
Democratic Left Party	1,015	2	1,017

=== Kayseri ===
Party	Vicinity vote	Customs vote	Total vote
Justice and Development Party	476,594	1,763	478,357
Democratic Party	3,894	10	3,904
Republican People's Party	89,224	269	89,493
Labour Party	1,096	12	1,108
Nation Party	476	0	476
Liberal Democratic Party	0	0	0
Felicity Party	9,878	36	9,914
Rights and Equality Party	1,309	3	1,312
People's Voice Party	5,660	6	5,666
Nationalist Movement Party	132,738	250	132,988
True Path Party	1,203	3	1,206
Communist Party of Turkey	550	2	552
Nationalist and Conservative Party	523	1	524
Great Union Party	10,013	13	10,026
Democratic Left Party	1,263	2	1,265

=== Kırıkkale ===
Party	Vicinity vote	Customs vote	Total vote
Justice and Development Party	104,649	387	105,036
Democratic Party	679	2	681
Republican People's Party	25,543	77	25,620
Labour Party	183	2	185
Nation Party	96	0	96
Liberal Democratic Party	49	0	49
Felicity Party	1,669	6	1,675
Rights and Equality Party	216	1	217
People's Voice Party	1,604	2	1,606
Nationalist Movement Party	31,742	60	31,802
True Path Party	245	1	246
Communist Party of Turkey	103	0	103
Nationalist and Conservative Party	125	0	125
Great Union Party	1,434	2	1,436
Democratic Left Party	230	0	230

=== Kırklareli ===
Party	Vicinity vote	Customs vote	Total vote
Justice and Development Party	62,215	230	62,445
Democratic Party	1,704	4	1,708
Republican People's Party	119,238	360	119,598
Labour Party	844	10	854
Nation Party	202	0	202
Liberal Democratic Party	106	0	106
Felicity Party	877	3	880
Rights and Equality Party	837	2	839
People's Voice Party	834	1	835
Nationalist Movement Party	37,567	71	37,638
True Path Party	510	1	511
Communist Party of Turkey	262	1	263
Nationalist and Conservative Party	204	1	205
Great Union Party	293	0	293
Democratic Left Party	926	2	928

=== Kırşehir ===
Party	Vicinity vote	Customs vote	Total vote
Justice and Development Party	65,438	242	65,680
Democratic Party	713	2	715
Republican People's Party	29,445	89	29,534
Labour Party	273	3	276
Nation Party	161	0	161
Liberal Democratic Party	63	0	63
Felicity Party	1,123	4	1,127
Rights and Equality Party	0	0	0
People's Voice Party	721	1	722
Nationalist Movement Party	28,675	54	28,729
True Path Party	298	1	299
Communist Party of Turkey	136	0	136
Nationalist and Conservative Party	168	0	168
Great Union Party	1,050	1	1,051
Democratic Left Party	270	1	271

=== Kilis ===
Party	Vicinity vote	Customs vote	Total vote
Justice and Development Party	38,823	144	38,967
Democratic Party	828	2	830
Republican People's Party	9,918	30	9,948
Labour Party	82	1	83
Nation Party	43	0	43
Liberal Democratic Party	12	0	12
Felicity Party	621	2	623
Rights and Equality Party	0	0	0
People's Voice Party	583	1	584
Nationalist Movement Party	13,682	26	13,708
True Path Party	180	0	180
Communist Party of Turkey	39	0	39
Nationalist and Conservative Party	50	0	50
Great Union Party	227	0	227
Democratic Left Party	75	0	75

=== Kocaeli ===
Party	Vicinity vote	Customs vote	Total vote
Justice and Development Party	502,675	1,860	504,535
Democratic Party	5,980	15	5,995
Republican People's Party	235,061	709	235,770
Labour Party	0	0	0
Nation Party	1,715	1	1,716
Liberal Democratic Party	0	0	0
Felicity Party	41,717	153	41,870
Rights and Equality Party	3,786	10	3,796
People's Voice Party	14,922	17	14,939
Nationalist Movement Party	114,089	215	114,304
True Path Party	1,855	4	1,859
Communist Party of Turkey	1,447	5	1,452
Nationalist and Conservative Party	757	2	759
Great Union Party	5,607	8	5,615
Democratic Left Party	2,410	4	2,414

=== Konya ===
Party	Vicinity vote	Customs vote	Total vote
Justice and Development Party	807,409	2,987	810,396
Democratic Party	6,717	17	6,734
Republican People's Party	118,577	358	118,935
Labour Party	0	0	0
Nation Party	1,491	1	1,492
Liberal Democratic Party	0	0	0
Felicity Party	25,236	92	25,328
Rights and Equality Party	0	0	0
People's Voice Party	13,216	15	13,231
Nationalist Movement Party	152,346	287	152,633
True Path Party	0	0	0
Communist Party of Turkey	1,499	5	1,504
Nationalist and Conservative Party	1,152	3	1,155
Great Union Party	14,727	20	14,747
Democratic Left Party	1,966	4	1,970

=== Kütahya ===
Party	Vicinity vote	Customs vote	Total vote
Justice and Development Party	241,233	892	242,125
Democratic Party	6,513	16	6,529
Republican People's Party	46,505	140	46,645
Labour Party	480	5	485
Nation Party	555	1	556
Liberal Democratic Party	0	0	0
Felicity Party	9,258	34	9,292
Rights and Equality Party	893	2	895
People's Voice Party	4,042	4	4,046
Nationalist Movement Party	59,222	112	59,334
True Path Party	0	0	0
Communist Party of Turkey	432	2	434
Nationalist and Conservative Party	409	1	410
Great Union Party	3,260	4	3,264
Democratic Left Party	868	2	870

=== Malatya ===
Party	Vicinity vote	Customs vote	Total vote
Justice and Development Party	293,559	1,086	294,645
Democratic Party	1,374	4	1,378
Republican People's Party	85,388	258	85,646
Labour Party	0	0	0
Nation Party	415	0	415
Liberal Democratic Party	0	0	0
Felicity Party	3,289	12	3,301
Rights and Equality Party	0	0	0
People's Voice Party	4,115	5	4,120
Nationalist Movement Party	35,227	66	35,293
True Path Party	290	1	291
Communist Party of Turkey	303	1	304
Nationalist and Conservative Party	182	0	182
Great Union Party	1,977	3	1,980
Democratic Left Party	347	1	348

=== Manisa ===
Party	Vicinity vote	Customs vote	Total vote
Justice and Development Party	405,733	1,501	407,234
Democratic Party	10,082	26	10,108
Republican People's Party	248,732	750	249,482
Labour Party	0	0	0
Nation Party	1,965	2	1,967
Liberal Democratic Party	534	2	536
Felicity Party	5,872	22	5,894
Rights and Equality Party	2,512	7	2,519
People's Voice Party	5,165	6	5,171
Nationalist Movement Party	146,357	276	146,633
True Path Party	2,891	7	2,898
Communist Party of Turkey	1,191	4	1,195
Nationalist and Conservative Party	946	2	948
Great Union Party	5,461	7	5,468
Democratic Left Party	2,928	5	2,933

=== Mardin ===
Party	Vicinity vote	Customs vote	Total vote
Justice and Development Party	103,021	381	103,402
Democratic Party	843	2	845
Republican People's Party	11,917	36	11,953
Labour Party	0	0	0
Nation Party	234	0	234
Liberal Democratic Party	128	1	129
Felicity Party	892	3	895
Rights and Equality Party	0	0	0
People's Voice Party	2,095	2	2,097
Nationalist Movement Party	2,037	4	2,041
True Path Party	0	0	0
Communist Party of Turkey	472	2	474
Nationalist and Conservative Party	239	1	240
Great Union Party	2,838	4	2,842
Democratic Left Party	657	1	658

=== Mersin ===
Party	Vicinity vote	Customs vote	Total vote
Justice and Development Party	309,903	1,147	311,050
Democratic Party	6,376	16	6,392
Republican People's Party	309,780	934	310,714
Labour Party	0	0	0
Nation Party	2,120	2	2,122
Liberal Democratic Party	0	0	0
Felicity Party	4,845	18	4,863
Rights and Equality Party	1,483	4	1,487
People's Voice Party	3,628	4	3,632
Nationalist Movement Party	224,055	422	224,477
True Path Party	2,211	5	2,216
Communist Party of Turkey	1,515	5	1,520
Nationalist and Conservative Party	889	2	891
Great Union Party	6,945	9	6,954
Democratic Left Party	1,849	3	1,852

=== Muğla ===
Party	Vicinity vote	Customs vote	Total vote
Justice and Development Party	169,596	627	170,223
Democratic Party	8,726	22	8,748
Republican People's Party	236,774	714	237,488
Labour Party	1,624	18	1,642
Nation Party	527	1	528
Liberal Democratic Party	292	1	293
Felicity Party	1,764	6	1,770
Rights and Equality Party	1,871	5	1,876
People's Voice Party	1,743	2	1,745
Nationalist Movement Party	84,303	159	84,462
True Path Party	2,010	5	2,015
Communist Party of Turkey	727	3	730
Nationalist and Conservative Party	609	1	610
Great Union Party	1,480	2	1,482
Democratic Left Party	1,633	3	1,636

=== Muş ===
Party	Vicinity vote	Customs vote	Total vote
Justice and Development Party	73,160	271	73,431
Democratic Party	709	2	711
Republican People's Party	7,094	21	7,115
Labour Party	0	0	0
Nation Party	108	0	108
Liberal Democratic Party	0	0	0
Felicity Party	2,031	7	2,038
Rights and Equality Party	0	0	0
People's Voice Party	1,143	1	1,144
Nationalist Movement Party	7,503	14	7,517
True Path Party	257	1	258
Communist Party of Turkey	404	1	405
Nationalist and Conservative Party	111	0	111
Great Union Party	2,116	3	2,119
Democratic Left Party	603	1	604

=== Nevşehir ===
Party	Vicinity vote	Customs vote	Total vote
Justice and Development Party	102,007	377	102,384
Democratic Party	1,195	3	1,198
Republican People's Party	27,699	84	27,783
Labour Party	285	3	288
Nation Party	90	0	90
Liberal Democratic Party	45	0	45
Felicity Party	2,847	10	2,857
Rights and Equality Party	269	1	270
People's Voice Party	1,593	2	1,595
Nationalist Movement Party	30,973	58	31,031
True Path Party	346	1	347
Communist Party of Turkey	136	0	136
Nationalist and Conservative Party	180	0	180
Great Union Party	1,569	2	1,571
Democratic Left Party	252	0	252

=== Niğde ===
Party	Vicinity vote	Customs vote	Total vote
Justice and Development Party	100,010	370	100,380
Democratic Party	1,199	3	1,202
Republican People's Party	39,654	120	39,774
Labour Party	363	4	367
Nation Party	137	0	137
Liberal Democratic Party	90	0	90
Felicity Party	2,737	10	2,747
Rights and Equality Party	0	0	0
People's Voice Party	1,646	2	1,648
Nationalist Movement Party	35,302	67	35,369
True Path Party	443	1	444
Communist Party of Turkey	163	1	164
Nationalist and Conservative Party	139	0	139
Great Union Party	2,142	3	2,145
Democratic Left Party	254	1	255

=== Ordu ===
Party	Vicinity vote	Customs vote	Total vote
Justice and Development Party	250,393	926	251,319
Democratic Party	2,537	6	2,543
Republican People's Party	94,069	284	94,353
Labour Party	1,036	12	1,048
Nation Party	410	0	410
Liberal Democratic Party	282	1	283
Felicity Party	3,684	14	3,698
Rights and Equality Party	792	2	794
People's Voice Party	6,201	7	6,208
Nationalist Movement Party	48,556	91	48,647
True Path Party	700	2	702
Communist Party of Turkey	465	2	467
Nationalist and Conservative Party	466	1	467
Great Union Party	1,758	2	1,760
Democratic Left Party	1,399	3	1,402

=== Osmaniye ===
Party	Vicinity vote	Customs vote	Total vote
Justice and Development Party	115,358	427	115,785
Democratic Party	1,080	3	1,083
Republican People's Party	30,784	93	30,877
Labour Party	0	0	0
Nation Party	275	0	275
Liberal Democratic Party	0	0	0
Felicity Party	2,014	7	2,021
Rights and Equality Party	316	1	317
People's Voice Party	1,869	2	1,871
Nationalist Movement Party	110,500	208	110,708
True Path Party	788	2	790
Communist Party of Turkey	268	1	269
Nationalist and Conservative Party	474	1	475
Great Union Party	1,713	2	1,715
Democratic Left Party	379	1	380

=== Rize ===
Party	Vicinity vote	Customs vote	Total vote
Justice and Development Party	134,053	496	134,549
Democratic Party	1,139	3	1,142
Republican People's Party	33,308	100	33,408
Labour Party	236	3	239
Nation Party	66	0	66
Liberal Democratic Party	79	0	79
Felicity Party	6,218	23	6,241
Rights and Equality Party	480	1	481
People's Voice Party	1,741	2	1,743
Nationalist Movement Party	14,901	28	14,929
True Path Party	206	0	206
Communist Party of Turkey	156	1	157
Nationalist and Conservative Party	184	0	184
Great Union Party	805	1	806
Democratic Left Party	347	1	348

=== Sakarya ===
Party	Vicinity vote	Customs vote	Total vote
Justice and Development Party	333,589	1,234	334,823
Democratic Party	3,229	8	3,237
Republican People's Party	87,778	265	88,043
Labour Party	826	9	835
Nation Party	375	0	375
Liberal Democratic Party	230	1	231
Felicity Party	14,566	53	14,619
Rights and Equality Party	1,543	4	1,547
People's Voice Party	9,196	10	9,206
Nationalist Movement Party	81,362	153	81,515
True Path Party	1,149	3	1,152
Communist Party of Turkey	512	2	514
Nationalist and Conservative Party	509	1	510
Great Union Party	2,141	3	2,144
Democratic Left Party	1,125	2	1,127

=== Samsun ===
Party	Vicinity vote	Customs vote	Total vote
Justice and Development Party	460,364	1,703	462,067
Democratic Party	7,600	19	7,619
Republican People's Party	162,229	489	162,718
Labour Party	1,509	17	1,526
Nation Party	612	1	613
Liberal Democratic Party	440	2	442
Felicity Party	11,924	44	11,968
Rights and Equality Party	1,697	5	1,702
People's Voice Party	7,186	8	7,194
Nationalist Movement Party	84,361	159	84,520
True Path Party	1,928	5	1,933
Communist Party of Turkey	860	3	863
Nationalist and Conservative Party	709	2	711
Great Union Party	4,995	7	5,002
Democratic Left Party	1,856	3	1,859

=== Siirt ===
Party	Vicinity vote	Customs vote	Total vote
Justice and Development Party	58,407	216	58,623
Democratic Party	502	1	503
Republican People's Party	3,509	11	3,520
Labour Party	0	0	0
Nation Party	85	0	85
Liberal Democratic Party	73	0	73
Felicity Party	908	3	911
Rights and Equality Party	0	0	0
People's Voice Party	1,441	2	1,443
Nationalist Movement Party	1,430	3	1,433
True Path Party	0	0	0
Communist Party of Turkey	343	1	344
Nationalist and Conservative Party	86	0	86
Great Union Party	1,949	3	1,952
Democratic Left Party	1,261	2	1,263

=== Sinop ===
Party	Vicinity vote	Customs vote	Total vote
Justice and Development Party	69,331	256	69,587
Democratic Party	997	3	1,000
Republican People's Party	39,146	118	39,264
Labour Party	490	6	496
Nation Party	267	0	267
Liberal Democratic Party	181	1	182
Felicity Party	1,440	5	1,445
Rights and Equality Party	968	3	971
People's Voice Party	1,335	1	1,336
Nationalist Movement Party	10,466	20	10,486
True Path Party	325	1	326
Communist Party of Turkey	244	1	245
Nationalist and Conservative Party	155	0	155
Great Union Party	401	1	402
Democratic Left Party	537	1	538

=== Sivas ===
Party	Vicinity vote	Customs vote	Total vote
Justice and Development Party	233,641	864	234,505
Democratic Party	1,045	3	1,048
Republican People's Party	56,364	170	56,534
Labour Party	519	6	525
Nation Party	127	0	127
Liberal Democratic Party	73	0	73
Felicity Party	6,449	24	6,473
Rights and Equality Party	424	1	425
People's Voice Party	2,176	2	2,178
Nationalist Movement Party	36,767	69	36,836
True Path Party	362	1	363
Communist Party of Turkey	298	1	299
Nationalist and Conservative Party	376	1	377
Great Union Party	12,852	17	12,869
Democratic Left Party	526	1	527

=== Şırnak ===
Party	Vicinity vote	Customs vote	Total vote
Justice and Development Party	428,866	1,587	430,453
Democratic Party	1,739	4	1,743
Republican People's Party	21,712	65	21,777
Labour Party	0	0	0
Nation Party	426	0	426
Liberal Democratic Party	0	0	0
Felicity Party	3,370	12	3,382
Rights and Equality Party	0	0	0
People's Voice Party	5,918	7	5,925
Nationalist Movement Party	22,315	42	22,357
True Path Party	597	1	598
Communist Party of Turkey	1,231	4	1,235
Nationalist and Conservative Party	554	1	555
Great Union Party	6,212	8	6,220
Democratic Left Party	699	1	700

=== Tekirdağ ===
Party	Vicinity vote	Customs vote	Total vote
Justice and Development Party	35,582	132	35,714
Democratic Party	490	1	491
Republican People's Party	5,139	16	5,155
Labour Party	0	0	0
Nation Party	69	0	69
Liberal Democratic Party	0	0	0
Felicity Party	255	1	256
Rights and Equality Party	0	0	0
People's Voice Party	1,008	1	1,009
Nationalist Movement Party	2,029	4	2,033
True Path Party	120	0	120
Communist Party of Turkey	342	1	343
Nationalist and Conservative Party	116	0	116
Great Union Party	1,815	2	1,817
Democratic Left Party	850	2	852

=== Tokat ===
Party	Vicinity vote	Customs vote	Total vote
Justice and Development Party	182,871	677	183,548
Democratic Party	3,755	10	3,765
Republican People's Party	226,142	682	226,824
Labour Party	1,606	18	1,624
Nation Party	479	1	480
Liberal Democratic Party	230	1	231
Felicity Party	3,361	12	3,373
Rights and Equality Party	3,682	10	3,692
People's Voice Party	3,931	4	3,935
Nationalist Movement Party	68,354	129	68,483
True Path Party	0	0	0
Communist Party of Turkey	964	3	967
Nationalist and Conservative Party	477	1	478
Great Union Party	2,330	3	2,333
Democratic Left Party	2,992	6	2,998

=== Trabzon ===
Party	Vicinity vote	Customs vote	Total vote
Justice and Development Party	201,735	746	202,481
Democratic Party	2,102	5	2,107
Republican People's Party	84,893	256	85,149
Labour Party	558	6	564
Nation Party	366	0	366
Liberal Democratic Party	0	0	0
Felicity Party	6,244	23	6,267
Rights and Equality Party	0	0	0
People's Voice Party	2,640	3	2,643
Nationalist Movement Party	57,149	108	57,257
True Path Party	717	2	719
Communist Party of Turkey	280	1	281
Nationalist and Conservative Party	263	1	264
Great Union Party	3,586	5	3,591
Democratic Left Party	357	1	358

=== Tunceli ===
Party	Vicinity vote	Customs vote	Total vote
Justice and Development Party	265,622	983	266,605
Democratic Party	4,747	12	4,759
Republican People's Party	82,948	250	83,198
Labour Party	680	8	688
Nation Party	350	0	350
Liberal Democratic Party	212	1	213
Felicity Party	15,783	58	15,841
Rights and Equality Party	1,010	3	1,013
People's Voice Party	7,496	8	7,504
Nationalist Movement Party	69,369	131	69,500
True Path Party	921	2	923
Communist Party of Turkey	430	2	432
Nationalist and Conservative Party	453	1	454
Great Union Party	1,931	3	1,934
Democratic Left Party	719	1	720

=== Şanlıurfa ===
Party	Vicinity vote	Customs vote	Total vote
Justice and Development Party	7,312	27	7,339
Democratic Party	211	1	212
Republican People's Party	26,723	81	26,804
Labour Party	0	0	0
Nation Party	111	0	111
Liberal Democratic Party	13	0	13
Felicity Party	71	0	71
Rights and Equality Party	0	0	0
People's Voice Party	65	0	65
Nationalist Movement Party	990	2	992
True Path Party	29	0	29
Communist Party of Turkey	119	0	119
Nationalist and Conservative Party	15	0	15
Great Union Party	322	0	322
Democratic Left Party	142	0	142

=== Uşak ===
Party	Vicinity vote	Customs vote	Total vote
Justice and Development Party	110,522	409	110,931
Democratic Party	1,608	4	1,612
Republican People's Party	66,187	200	66,387
Labour Party	603	7	610
Nation Party	220	0	220
Liberal Democratic Party	116	1	117
Felicity Party	2,672	10	2,682
Rights and Equality Party	502	1	503
People's Voice Party	1,125	1	1,126
Nationalist Movement Party	36,326	68	36,394
True Path Party	459	1	460
Communist Party of Turkey	197	1	198
Nationalist and Conservative Party	191	1	192
Great Union Party	880	1	881
Democratic Left Party	663	1	664

=== Van ===
Party	Vicinity vote	Customs vote	Total vote
Justice and Development Party	171,120	633	171,753
Democratic Party	1,847	5	1,852
Republican People's Party	15,996	48	16,044
Labour Party	0	0	0
Nation Party	362	0	362
Liberal Democratic Party	498	2	500
Felicity Party	1,974	7	1,981
Rights and Equality Party	0	0	0
People's Voice Party	1,762	2	1,764
Nationalist Movement Party	12,713	24	12,737
True Path Party	0	0	0
Communist Party of Turkey	1,535	5	1,540
Nationalist and Conservative Party	450	1	451
Great Union Party	5,376	7	5,383
Democratic Left Party	1,267	2	1,269

=== Yalova ===
Party	Vicinity vote	Customs vote	Total vote
Justice and Development Party	58,957	218	59,175
Democratic Party	880	2	882
Republican People's Party	40,852	123	40,975
Labour Party	230	3	233
Nation Party	50	0	50
Liberal Democratic Party	71	0	71
Felicity Party	1,935	7	1,942
Rights and Equality Party	452	1	453
People's Voice Party	811	1	812
Nationalist Movement Party	13,087	25	13,112
True Path Party	194	0	194
Communist Party of Turkey	176	1	177
Nationalist and Conservative Party	98	0	98
Great Union Party	937	1	938
Democratic Left Party	349	1	350

=== Yozgat ===
Party	Vicinity vote	Customs vote	Total vote
Justice and Development Party	170,289	630	170,919
Democratic Party	1,088	3	1,091
Republican People's Party	28,081	85	28,166
Labour Party	250	3	253
Nation Party	130	0	130
Liberal Democratic Party	84	0	84
Felicity Party	2,796	10	2,806
Rights and Equality Party	0	0	0
People's Voice Party	2,517	3	2,520
Nationalist Movement Party	46,973	89	47,062
True Path Party	404	1	405
Communist Party of Turkey	158	1	159
Nationalist and Conservative Party	259	1	260
Great Union Party	3,201	4	3,205
Democratic Left Party	253	0	253

=== Zonguldak ===
Party	Vicinity vote	Customs vote	Total vote
Justice and Development Party	183,667	679	184,346
Democratic Party	2,917	7	2,924
Republican People's Party	145,902	440	146,342
Labour Party	1,280	15	1,295
Nation Party	580	1	581
Liberal Democratic Party	416	2	418
Felicity Party	7,985	29	8,014
Rights and Equality Party	0	0	0
People's Voice Party	3,354	4	3,358
Nationalist Movement Party	24,587	46	24,633
True Path Party	858	2	860
Communist Party of Turkey	586	2	588
Nationalist and Conservative Party	543	1	544
Great Union Party	2,286	3	2,289
Democratic Left Party	2,613	5	2,618
