= Lissy Schmidt =

German journalist

- Born: ca. 1959
- Died: 3 April 1994 (Age 35); Sulaymaniyah, Iraq
- Other names: Milena Ergen & Petra Sert
- Occupation: Journalist
- Years active: since the 1980s
- Employer(s): Agence France Presse, Frankfurter Rundschau, and Der Tagesspiegel
- Known for: her reports on Kurds in Turkey and Iraq
- Notable work: Tatort Kurdistan, Wie Teuer Ist Die Freiheit

Lissy Schmidt (ca. 1959 – 3 April 1994), also known by her pseudonyms Milena Ergen and Petra Sert, was a German journalist who worked for the Agence France Presse, Frankfurter Rundschau (Frankfurt), and Der Tagesspiegel (Berlin). She and her driver were both killed in an ambush outside of Sulaymaniyah, Iraq, while she was reporting about the Iraqi Kurds. The publication of one of her books in Turkish led to its ban in Turkey and provoked a freedom of expression case in Europe.

== Personal ==
Lissy Schmidt was from Wiesbaden, Germany. She was a member of Pax Christi in Limburg and founded chapters in Wiesbaden and Idstein. Schmidt knew two Kurdish-language dialects, Sorani and Kirmanji, and according to Die Zeit newspaper, she was well known among Kurds. She was murdered when she was 35 years old. A monument in her memory was constructed in Sulaymaniyah, Iraq.

== Career ==
Lissy Schmidt worked for Agence France Presse, Frankfurter Rundschau, and Der Tagesspiegel. Before reporting from Iraq, she had reported on Kurdish issues in Turkey for Frankfurter Rundschau. She had been assigned by the AFP to work in Kurdish Iraq on Kurdish issues and had been based there since 1991. Under her pseudonym Milena Ergen, Schmidt published two books on Kurdistan, Tatort Kurdistan (Translated: "Crime Scene Kurdistan") in 1989 and Wie Teuer Ist Die Freiheit? (Translated: How Expensive is Freedom), which was published after her death in 1994. Her latter work was also published posthumously by Turkish publisher Ayşe Nur Zarakolu in Turkish in 1997. The Turkish government banned Schmidt's book and pressed charges against Zarakolu, although Zarakolu died while the case was in progress before the European Commission of Human Rights.

== Death ==
Lissy Schmidt was killed along with Aziz Kadir Farag, her driver and bodyguard, on 3 April 1994 when a car with a driver and an armed attacker passed their vehicle and the perpetrator shot into their car.

The Independent (UK) reported that two Iraqi men later confessed to their Iraqi Kurdish interrogators that they killed Lissy Schmidt and her driver because their family members were held captive and the Iraqi government ordered them to kill the foreigners to ensure the protection of their loved ones. Two men were later hanged for her murder.

== Context ==
The United States accused the Iraqi government of putting prices on the killing of foreigners in the Kurdish region of northern Iraq. The month before Schmidt's murder, two Swedish reporters were injured after a bomb exploded in their empty car and two Czechs and two Austrians were injured by other attacks. Two other UN guards were injured two days after Schmidt's murder.

== Impact ==
The murder of German journalists does not occur frequently but Schmidt is part of a growing number to have been killed in conflicts abroad.

== Reactions ==
German politician Angelika Beer wore ribbons in her hair of the Kurdish national colors in honor of her friend Lissy Schmidt and for this was criticized by the Turkish government while on an official visit.

== See also ==
- Ayşe Nur Zarakolu
- Ragip Zarakolu
