= Dora Sakayan =

Armenian academic and educator

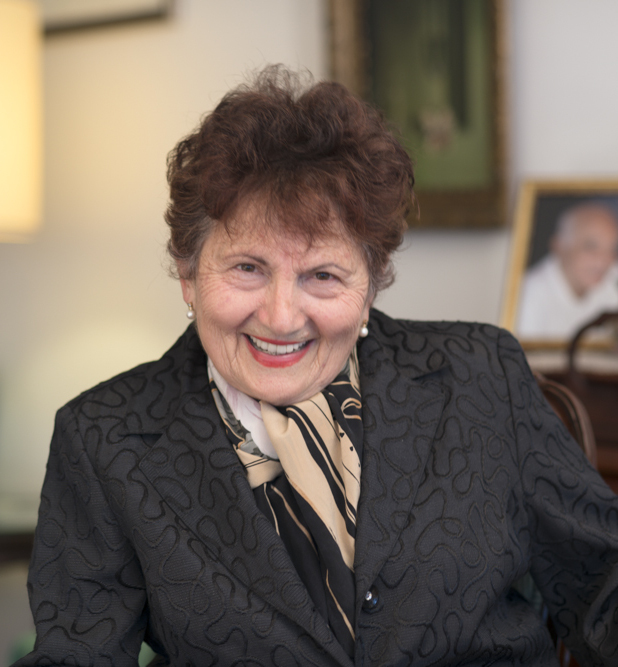
- Dora Sakayan, photograph by Marine Anakhatounian

Dora Sakayan (classical Armenian orthography: Դորա Սաքայեան Dora Sak'ayean; reformed: Դորա Սաքայան Dora Sak'ayan; born January 24, 1931), Professor of German Studies (retired), McGill University. Specializing initially as a Germanist, today she is also known for her work in various areas of Applied Linguistics and Armenology. Sakayan is noted for pioneering Armenology in Canada and for her books and articles published in her series "Armenian Studies for the English-speaking World."

== Life, education and career ==
Sakayan was born in 1931 in Salonica, Greece, to Armenian parents who had escaped the Armenian genocide. She grew up in a multilingual environment, with her first languages being Western Armenian and Modern Greek, and received early exposure to German, French and Turkish. After immigrating to Soviet Armenia, she received her education in Eastern Armenian and Russian. Later on, she mastered English and learned other languages.

Sakayan received her elementary education at the Armenian Gulabi Gulbenkian School in Salonica. She then attended the local German high school Deutsche Schule Saloniki. She was 11 years old when her family moved to Vienna, Austria, where she pursued her high school education at the Gymnasium for girls in the 7th District of Vienna "Oberschule für Mädchen, Wien VII."

In 1946, Sakayan's family repatriated to Soviet Armenia where she completed her secondary education. In 1948, she was admitted to the Yerevan State Pedagogical Institute of Foreign Languages (YSPL) where she graduated with a diploma in Germanic linguistics and in Pedagogy in 1952. She was then appointed as an instructor of German at YSPL, where she taught from 1952 to 1956. In 1957, she was invited to teach in the Department of Romance and Germanic Philology at Yerevan State University (YSU, 1956–1958).

Sakayan began her graduate studies in Germanic philology in 1958 at the Lomonosov Moscow State University (LMSU) and graduated in 1961. Over the following four years, she shared her time between Moscow and Yerevan to pursue her teaching duties in Germanic Philology at YSU and complete her PhD thesis while raising her two young children. She obtained her PhD in Germanic Philology from Moscow Lomonosov University in 1965.

In 1965, Sakayan became Head of the Department of Foreign languages of YSU, a position she held for ten years. At the same time, she lectured in the Department of Romance-Germanic Philology of YSU.

Sakayan immigrated to Canada in January 1975 and began to teach German at two universities: McGill University, (Department of German Studies) and the Université de Montréal (Department of Études des langues anciennes et modernes). In 1977, she was offered a full-time position at McGill and left Université de Montréal. Due to her high ratings as an instructor of German at McGill, in 1978 she was offered a joint appointment with the Department of Russian and Slavic Studies where she taught for ten years. Over the years, Sakayan rose to the rank of Full Professor at McGill University.

In 1981, Sakayan began her groundbreaking work in Armenian Studies at McGill. At the Centre of Continuing Education, she founded and supervised a program of credited Armenian courses anchored in the Department of Russian and Slavic Studies. She edited and prepared for publication a number of Armenological manuscripts of linguistic, literary and historic interest, translated several books and articles from Armenian into other languages and vice versa, and made book tours. She became a regular participant at international Armenological conferences and congresses, and she also organized Armenological conferences in Canada and Armenia. Seeing her mission in presenting Armenian language and culture to non-Armenians, she founded the series "Armenian Studies for the English Speaking World" and published a number of scholarly books and articles under this heading. To promote the publication of her Armenological books, in 1997 she founded a small press under the name AROD Books in Montreal.

After 25 years of service at McGill University, Sakayan retired from the Department of German Studies in 2000 and dedicated herself fully to Armenian Studies. She renewed her ties with Yerevan State University, where she regularly spends a few months every year, participating in scholarly projects, organizing international linguistic conferences, publishing her books with YSU Press and organizing book launches at YSU and elsewhere in Armenia. Among many activities in her homeland, one is especially noteworthy: for more than 15 years, and in collaboration with her former student, Evelina Makaryan, who has recently retired, Sakayan has translated several books related to the Armenian genocide from German into Armenian.

At the same time, Sakayan continues the promotion of Armenian Studies in Canada. In 2005, she founded an Armenian language program at the Diocese of the Armenian Apostolic Church in Montreal, carrying on a tradition that she established more than three decades ago (in 1981) at the Centre of Continuing Education at McGill University.

== Works ==
=== Contrastive grammar ===
As a Germanist and educator in the East European tradition, Sakayan has received training in Germanic linguistics and language pedagogy. This background has led her to applied linguistics, and from the great variety of its interdisciplinary branches Sakayan has concentrated on the following areas: a) contrastive linguistics, b) foreign language acquisition, c) translation studies.

Sakayan includes into the contrastive discussion, besides German, other Indo-European languages: Russian, English, French, and Modern Greek. As an innovation, she also includes Armenian, a non-European language whose agglutinative properties set it apart from other languages in the Indo-European family. In fact, in Sakayan's work, contrastive analysis is predominantly based on Armenian, and other languages are viewed through the prism of this language. The objectives of such an endeavor are to establish language typologies and to identify areas of difficulty in foreign language acquisition. Her work also incorporates the findings of Armenian and Russian data — not always accessible to Western linguists.

Sakayan introduces to the Western reader the idiosyncrasies of Eastern Armenian morphology and syntax, with a special focus on the verb system and its rich paradigm of non-finite verb forms, called derbays (դերբայ = participle). Over the years, she has dealt extensively with East Armenian deverbal nominalizations, deriving from certain derbays: the Armenian infinitive and three participles: the present, past and the future participle. Within the framework of "Nominalizations of various degrees" Sakayan discusses the regular relative clause (RC), the ‘relative participles’ (RP based on the present, past and the future participle), as well and other phenomena of relativization in Eastern Armenian.

Sakayan contrasts Armenian clausal nominalizations with their semantic counterparts in a selective number of European languages. A noteworthy monograph in this respect is Formen der Textkohärenz: Nominalisierung als sententiale Anapher im Ostarmenischen. This book explores East Armenian clausal nominalizations that are based on the Armenian infinitive. Sakayan describes the transformation process of finite clauses into economical nominal phrases, gives the morphosyntactic characteristics of these nominalizations, identifies the functions of the agglutinative segments in a synthetic nominalized infinitive (SNI).

=== Contrastive phraseology ===
Sakayan has also taken a keen interest in contrastive phraseology in the general sense of the term. Recognizing the importance of ready-made expressions in human communication, she has based her research on self-collected linguistic corpora of phraseological units, such as proverbs and sayings, idiomatic expressions, and routine formulae (gambits).

Sakayan has explored the reproduction of routine formulae (gambits) and their role for turn-taking in conversation and for organizing discourse She has created thematically and pragmatically grouped bilingual concordances of routine formulae (gambits) for language learning. See the use of such concordances in Sakayan's textbooks.

Sakayan's interest in proverbs resulted in a major paremiological study accompanied by a bilingual (Armenian-English), thematically arranged anthology of 2,500 proverbs. An extensive introduction addresses the language and structure, as well as the origin of Armenian proverbs (international, borrowed and specifically Armenian proverbs).

Contrastive paremiology being an ongoing project, Sakayan's next volume became a language-pair-oriented paremiological study with special focus on German-Armenian connections and discussions on cross-cultural translatability. In 2001, the German counterpart of this paremiological study appeared with a new introduction that provides an in-depth analysis of the structure and language of Armenian proverbs. Along with the extreme conciseness of the Armenian proverbs, Sakayan points to their capacity to function in various sizes and shapes, from extremely short and compact units to more elaborate and wordy structures (e.g. dialogues). Some of them encapsulate people's everyday talk, citations of reported or direct speech. Since dialogue proverbs or dramatized proverbs are not a universal genre and can be found only in a few languages, Sakayan explores them extensively.

=== Foreign language acquisition ===
Sakayan's scholarly interest in foreign language acquisition is apparent not only in the titles of her published articles, but also in the list of authored and co-authored textbooks, instructional manuals and methodological guides, for the instruction of both German and Armenian as foreign languages Some of these projects demonstrate the benefits of applying the latest trends in linguistics to instructional development. In the 1960s and 1970s, while chairing the Department of Foreign Languages at Yerevan State University (YSU) in Soviet Armenia, Sakayan authored and co-authored several textbooks, manuals and methodological guides for the instruction of German in Armenian high schools and universities. However, in accordance with Soviet censorship rules that deprived expatriate authors of authorship, the production of all books carrying her name had to be discontinued after Sakayan's departure to Canada in 1975.

After resettling in Canada, Sakayan continued her research in Foreign Language Methodology. In close collaboration with Professor Christine Tessier of Université Laval in Quebec City, Canada, Sakayan conducted the research project dedicated to German Stereotyped Speech Forms in Mini-Dialogues. Sakayan and Tessier laid the groundwork for a new method of communicative exercises that has received widespread recognition in the area of DaF (Deutsch als Fremdsprache, or German as a Foreign Language). The project resulted in a book called Rede und Antwort, widely used as a supplement to other DaF textbooks at universities; in 1991 it was declared in the AOL-Reference Manual as "a hit textbook for DaF."

The innovative method is based on the introduction of German Stereotyped Speech Forms, or gambits, known for their important role in languages while turn-taking in interaction. Gambits used at the beginning of an utterance are seen as cues that signal not only the illocutionary feature of an utterance, but also its syntactic-semantic unfolding. The method broadly applies speech act theory and text linguistics, as well as some insights of "grammar of expectancy," to the teaching of DaF. The Rede und Antwort exercises have proven to be an effective means for promoting oral skills in the classroom, which are readily applicable in real life-settings.

Inspired by the success of the Rede und Antwort, in the 1990s Sakayan launched and carried out a completely new project: an introductory university textbook for Western Armenian (Western Armenian for the English-speaking World: A Contrastive Approach). The textbook, which first appeared in 2000, draws on more recent achievements of linguistics in the instruction of Western Armenian. It demonstrates the great potential that contrastive linguistics has for the advancement of foreign language teaching by outlining Armenian-English contrasts throughout the course. It also applies the insights of text linguistics and grammar of expectancy by enhancing the production of correct grammatical forms anticipated by the reproduction of certain ready-made routine formulae. The textbook is conceptualized pragmatically, enabling students to carry out speech acts fundamental for communication. Although grammar receives proper attention, other linguistic aspects such as word formation, semantic vocabulary groups, pronunciation, orthography, etc. are also treated on a regular basis. The textbook was received positively and was adopted by Armenian Studies Programs at universities and schools worldwide.

In 2007, Sakayan published a new Armenian textbook, this time on Eastern Armenian, also accompanied by a CD-Rom featuring Eastern Armenian native speakers. To bring the level of the existing Western Armenian textbook to that of its Eastern Armenian counterpart, in 2012 Sakayan published a second and revised edition (with CD-Rom).

Both titles are now published by YSU Press. They are consistent in methodology and structure, with a vast amount of linguistic material proportionally distributed among 12 Units, which each consist of 12 sections. These twin Armenian textbooks are considered to be the highlight of Sakayan's career, reflecting a lifetime of pedagogical and scholarly experience in foreign language teaching and research in applied linguistics.

=== Armenian genocide ===
Sakayan is also a major contributor to the study of the Armenian genocide. In 1993, she came across the journal of her maternal grandfather, Dr. Garabed Hatcherian, and has since dedicated herself to its publication and dissemination. The journal is a chronicle of the Smyrna catastrophe of 1922, which describes how the ancient port city in Asia Minor was destroyed by a massive fire, whereby the entire Christian population was either massacred or forced to flee. The journal is also a detailed account of the hardship Dr. Hatcherian and his family of eight endured in September 1922. Dr. Hatcherian's diary is considered to be the most widely translated book about the Armenian genocide. So far, the journal has appeared in nine languages, three of which were translated by Sakayan, who is also the general editor of all editions. All volumes include a detailed biography of the author, a literary analysis of the journal in an expanded introduction, 52 annotations of an historical and cultural nature, an afterword, and a bibliography. The meticulous editorial work has made An Armenian Doctor in Turkey a book that has received a highly favorable international reception. Sakayan is also the editor-in-chief of an important book documenting the Armenian genocide: the newest edition of Theodik's (Theodoros Lapchindjian) book Memorial to April 11 (Armenian: Յուշարձան ապրիլ 11-ի- Hushartsan Abril 11-i), which was created with the assistance of renowned journalist and human-rights activist and publisher Ragip Zarakolu (Istanbul: Belge Publishers) and appeared in 2010. This book was first compiled and published in Turkish by Theodik in 1919 in Istanbul to pay tribute to the murdered intellectuals and community leaders of 1915—writers, journalists, editors, clergymen, academics, teachers, and jurists.

This latest edition of Theodik's “Hushartsan” (Memorial), published in commemoration of the 95th Anniversary of the Armenian genocide, is a bilingual production (Armenian and Turkish) with a trilingual introductory section (Armenian, Turkish, and English) dedicated to the memory of Hrant Dink, the Armenian journalist who was murdered in Istanbul in 2007. Also included in this volume is an Armenian and Turkish index of the names of the 761 Armenian martyrs of April 11 (April 24 according to the Gregorian calendar).

Over the last two decades, Sakayan has been working on a translation project with one of her former students, Evelina Makaryan, a researcher at the Institute for Armenian Studies at YSU. This project has yielded six books that Sakayan and Makaryan translated from German into Armenian and published with YSU Press. The translations are predominantly eyewitness testimonies of the Armenian genocide that Sakayan has collected from libraries in German-speaking countries.

Sakayan's latest (and most important) work is a book entitled «Man treibt sie in die Wüste»; Clara und Fritz Sigrist-Hilty als Augenzeugen des Völkermordes an den Armeniern 1915–1918 ["They drive them into the desert": Clara and Fritz Sigrist-Hilty as eyewitnesses of the Armenian Genocide 1915-1918] on the writings of Clara Sigrist-Hilty (1884–1988). One day after their church wedding in April 1915, the civil engineer Fritz Sigrist and the nurse Clara Hilty take the train from Werdenberg (Switzerland) and travel through the war zone to South-Eastern Turkey, where Fritz has been working at the construction of the Baghdad railway since 1910. They settle in Keller (today's Fevzipaşa), a little town on the flank of the Amanus mountains. Shortly after their arrival, the Armenian deportations start and thousands of Armenians walk past their window. For three years the couple has to witness «the lapsing of human lights down there in the steep gorge» while they live their everyday life in their little house on the remote hillside. A visit to Aleppo makes them realize that what they were seeing in Keller on a daily basis was nothing but premeditated death marches. Things deteriorate when the skilled Armenian workers at the Baghdad railway construction site must also join those death marches. Clara feels obliged to record the atrocities, first in her journal, and later in a special eyewitness account. Fritz in his turn writes some important essays on the subject.

Sakayan has deciphered and transcribed the documents written in Gothic handwriting; she has meticulously processed the data and embedded them in the historic events of the time. Moreover, based on a memoir by Haig Aramian, Sakayan recounts the adventurous story of how in June 1916 the couple Sigrist-Hilty helped their Armenian storehouse manager Aramian to escape certain death. The structure of the book presented itself from the available archival materials. The book consists of three parts, each centered around one main character: Clara and Fritz Sigrist-Hilty, and Haig Aramian. Through a thoughtful interplay of primary and secondary texts, Sakayan tells a coherent story of endless human suffering, but also of Christian compassion and selflessness.

=== Translations ===
At an early stage of her career, Sakayan's knowledge of languages directed her towards translation and interpretation, and some of her translations were published early on. Sakayan has translated texts of various length and genres, from books to mini-texts, from poems to novels, and from gambits to proverbs. This furthered her interest in the theoretical aspects of translation. During the Summer semesters between 1981 and 1986, her contact and collaboration with the Translation Department of Saarbrücken University in Germany (Chairman: Dr. Wolfram Wilss) intensified her involvement and productivity in that field and resulted in several articles published in scholarly journals and books, as well as in several papers presented at international conferences.

== List of works ==
=== Selected books ===
- (2024) Sakayan, Dora. 2500 Armenische Sprichwörter in deutscher Übersetzung [2500 Armenian Proverbs in German Translation]. Yerevan State University Press (in German). ISBN 978-5-8084-2662-7
- (2023) Sakayan, Dora. Death Marches Past the Front Door. Clara and Fritz Sigrist-Hilty: Swiss Eyewitnesses to the Armenian Dante-Inferno in Turkey (1915–1918). California State University Press, Fresno. ISBN 978-0-912201-83-2
- (2019) Sakayan, Dora. 2500 Proverbes arméniens traduits en français [2500 Armenian Proverbs in French Translation]. Montréal: Arod Books (in French). ISBN 978-0-9699879-9-4
- (2017) Սաքայան, Դորա. «Նրանց քշում են անապատները...» Կլարա և Ֆրից Զիգրիստ-Հիլթիները Հայոց ցեղասպանության ականատեսներ (1915–1918) [They Drive Them into the Desert. Clara and Fritz Sigrist-Hilty as Eyewitnesses to the Armenian Genocide]. Yerevan State University Press (in Armenian). ISBN 978-5-8084-2210-0
- (2016) Sakayan, Dora. «Man treibt sie in die Wüste»: Clara und Fritz Sigrist-Hilty als Augenzeugen des Völkermordes an den Armeniern 1915–1918 [They Drive Them into the Desert: Clara and Fritz Sigrist-Hilty as Eyewitnesses of the Armenian Genocide 1915–1918]. Zürich: Limmat-Verlag (in German). ISBN 978-3-85791-815-5
- (2012) Sakayan, Dora. Western Armenian for the English-speaking World. A Contrastive Approach (with CD-ROM). Yerevan State University Press. ISBN 978-5-8084-0890-6
- (2009) Sakayan, Dora. Armenian Proverbs in English Translation. Montreal: Arod Books. ISBN 978-0-9699879-6-3
- (2008) Sakayan, Dora. Eastern Armenian for the English-speaking World. A Contrastive Approach (with CD-ROM). Revised Edition. Yerevan State University Press. ISBN 978-5-8084-0-8
- (2003) Jahukian, Gevork and Sakayan, Dora. A Universal Theory of Language. Prolegomena to Substantional Linguistics. Ann Arbor: Caravan Books (in English). ISBN 0-88206-105-4
- (2001) Sakayan, Dora. Armenische Sprichwörter. Wiesbaden: Otto Harrassowitz Verlag (in German). ISBN 3-447-04379-2
- (2000) Sakayan, Dora. Modern Western Armenian for the English-speaking World. A Contrastive Approach. Montreal: Arod Books. ISBN 0-9699879-2-7
- (1997) Sakayan, Dora. An Armenian Doctor in Turkey: Garabed Hatcherian, My Smyrna Ordeal of 1922. Montreal: Arod Books. ISBN 978-0-9699879-1-8
- (1994/1995) Sakayan, Dora. Armenian Proverbs. A Paremiological Study with an Anthology of 2,500 Armenian Folk Sayings Selected and Translated into English. Delmar & New York: Caravan Books, First edition: 1994, 477 pp., Second and revised edition: 1995. ISBN 0-88206-084-8
- (1986) Sakayan, Dora. Formen der Textkohärenz: Nominalisierung als sententiale Anapher im Ostarmenischen. In: Tübinger Beiträge zur Linguistik, Nr. 299 [Forms of Textual Coherence: Nominalization as Sentential Anaphor in East Armenian]. Tübingen: Gunter Narr (in German). ISBN 3-87808-299-1

=== Selected articles ===
- (2018) Սաքայան, Դորա. «Հանրալեզվաբանական մոտեցում առածների թարգմանության մեջ», in: Ժամանակակից լեզվաբանությունը միջգիտակարգայնության լույսի ներքո. Միջազգային գիտաժողովի նյութեր, ԵՊՀ-ի հրատարակչություն, էջ 7-30. [The sociolinguistic aspect of translating proverbs, in: Contemporary Linguistics in the Light of Interdisciplinarity, International Conference Proceedings, May 17–18, 2016], YSU Press, 2018, p. 7-30.
- (2016) Սաքայան, Դորա. «Կլարա Զիգրիստ-Հիլթիի օրագրությունները Հայոց ցեղասպանության մասին», in: Հայոց ցեղասպանության 100 տարի. Ճանաչումից հատուցում։ Հայոց ցեղասպանության հարյուրամյակին նվիրված գիտաժողովի հոդվածների ժողովածու, ՀՀ ԳԱԱ-ի «Գիտություն» հրատարակչություն, էջ 361–370. [The diary of Clara Sigrist-Hilty on the Armenian Genocide, in: From Recognition to Restitution. Proceedings of the Conference dedicated to the 100th Anniversary of the Armenian Genocide, «Science» Press of the NAS RA, pp. 361–370]:
- (2015) Սաքայան, Դորա. «Լեզվի տնտեսական սկզբունքը հայերենի դերբայական հարացույցում. Տիպաբանական քննություն» in: Արդի բանասիրության խնդիրները. Միջազգային գիտաժողովի նյութերի ժողովածու նվիրված Մանուկ Աբեղյանի ծննդյան 150-ամյակին, Վանաձորի Հովհաննես Թումանյանի անվան պետական համալսարան, հոկտեմբեր 3-6, 2015 [Language economy in the Armenian participial paradigm: A typological examination, in: Issues of Modern Philology: Proceedings of the International Conference, Dedicated to the 150th Anniversary of Manouk Abeghyan, Vanadzor State University, October 3–6, 2015]. pp. 233–242.
- (2014) Սաքայան, Դորա. «Խնդրառության մի քանի հարցեր» in: Ջահուկյանական ընթերցումներ, Երևան 2014, հունիսի 11-12, ՀՀ ԳԱԱ Հ. Աճառյանի անվան ինստիտուտ [On some problems of governing, in: Djahukian Readings: International Symposium Reports, Yerevan, June 11–12, 2014. Institute of Linguistics, National Academy of Sciences, Armenia]. pp. 179–186.
- (2011) Սաքայան, Դորա. «Հայերենի բնօրինակ հասկացությունների ընկալման և այլ լեզուների թարգմանելու հնարավորությունների մասին» [On understanding and translating "genuine" Armenian words], in: D. Sakayan et al. Sign, System, Communications. Selected Papers dedicated to the Memory of Edward Atayan. [Նշան, համակարգ, Հաղորդակցում. Հոդվածների ժողովածու` նվիրված Էդվարդ Աթայանին]. Yerevan State University Press. pp. 334–347.
- (2011) Սաքայան, Դորա. «Հայերենի անորոշ դերբայը նոր լույսի տակ» [The Armenian infinitive revisited]. In: D. Sakayan et al. (eds,) Sign, System, Communications. Selected Papers dedicated to the Memory of Edward Atayan. [Նշան, համակարգ, Հաղորդակցում. Հոդվածների ժողովածու` նվիրված Էդվարդ Աթայանին]. Yerevan State University Press. pp. 207–216.
- (2001) "On newer trends in Foreign language teaching. Expectancy Grammar." In: Semiotics and Language Teaching. Theoretical Principles and Practical Applications. Ann Arbor: Caravan Books, 2001, pp. 9–14.
- (1999) Sakayan, Dora. "On Reported and Direct Speech in Proverbs. Dialogue Proverbs in Armenian." In: Proverbium: Yearbook of International Proverb Scholarship, Vol. 16, 1999, pp. 303–324.
- (1998) Sakayan, Dora. "Ein Freund kann dir das Gesicht weiß oder schwarz machen: Zum Problem der Übersetzbarkeit von Sprichwörtern" [Problems of proverb translatability]. In: Ferdinand van Ingen and Christian Juranek (eds.). Ars et Amicitia, Festschrift für Martin Bircher zum 60. Geburtstag am 3. Juni 1998. Chloe. Beihefte zum Daphnis. Bd. 28. Amsterdam and Atlanta, Rodopi, 1998, pp. 57–73.
- (1998) Sakayan, Dora (1998). "On Cross-Cultural Understanding of Language-Specific Notions and Concepts in Folklore." In: Alice Sarkösi (ed.), Festschrift for Edmond Schütz, Budapest: Academy of Sciences Press, 1998, pp. 130–145.
- (1997) Sakayan, Dora. "Folk Beliefs in Armenian Proverbs." In: N. Awde (ed.), Armenian Perspectives. 10th Anniversary Conference of the Association Internationale des Études Arméniennes. School of Oriental and African Studies, London: Caucasus World/Curzon Press, 1997, pp. 157–182 and 393–394.
- (1993) Sakayan, Dora. "On Armenian Relative Participles and their Access to the AH (Accessibility Hierarchy)." In: Proceedings of the XVth International Congress of Linguists, Université Laval, 1992, Quebec: Université Laval Press, 1993, vol. 2, pp. 361–364.
- (1992) Sakayan, Dora. "On the Grammar of Armenian Proverbs." In: John A. C. Greppin (ed.), Proceedings. Fourth International Conference on Armenian Linguistics. Cleveland State University, Cleveland, September 14–19, 1991, Delmar & New York: Caravan Books, 1992, pp. 171–201.
- (1990) Sakayan, Dora. "Übersetzung im Dienste der Sprachbeschreibung. Zur Zusammenführung von Relativkonstruktionen" [Translation serving linguistic description. How to unify relative constructions]. In: R. Arntz/G. Thome (eds.), Übersetzungswissenschaft. Ergebnisse und Perspektiven. Festschrift für W. Wilss zum 65. Geburstag, Tübingen: Gunter Narr, 1990, pp. 453–465.
- (1990) Sakayan, Dora. "Translation as a Means of Defining Grammatical Structures," Meta 35/No 1, 1990, pp. 80–88.
- (1989) Sakayan, Dora. On Factive/Non-Factive Connectors in Natural Languages" [On factive and non-factive connectors in natural languages]. In: W. Bahner et al. (eds.), Fourteenth International Congress of Linguists, Berlin/GDR, August 10–15, 1987, Berlin: Akademie-Verlag, 1989, pp. 1056–101059.
- (1984) Sakayan, Dora. "Transposition...or Literary Translation?" Meta, Vol. 31, No 4, 1986: pp. 377–386.
- (1984) Sakayan, Dora. "Zur didaktischen Behandlung der Rekurrenz in mehrsprachigen Texten" [On the didactic treatment of recurrence in multilingual texts]. In: W. Wilss/ G. Thome (eds.), Translation Theory and its Implementation in the Teaching of Translating and Interpreting, Tübingen: Narr, pp. 165–175.
- (1983) Sakayan, Dora; Tessier, Christine (1983). "Acquiring Oral Skills through Stereotype Speech Forms." Co-Author: Chr. Tessier, Unterrichtspraxis 1983/3, pp. 91–98.
- (1983) Sakayan, Dora; Tessier, Christine (1983). "Deutsche Gesprächsformeln in Mikrodialogen" [German Speech Formulae in Mini-Dialogues]. Zielsprache Deutsch 1983/3: pp. 9–14.
- (1963) "Сложные прилагательные, обозначающие цвет в современном немецком языке." [Compound Adjectives of Color in German], UZEU, 1963, pp. 120–136.
- (1963) "Структурноьсемантические особенности сложных прилагательных типа rotgelb" [Structural and Semantic Features of Compound Adjectives in German], NTEGU, 1963, pp. 177–195.

=== Textbooks ===
- (2007) Sakayan, Dora. Eastern Armenian for the English-speaking World.. A Contrastive Approach (with CD-ROM). Yerevan State University Press. ISBN 978-978-58084-0-7
- (1989) Sakayan, Dora and Christine Tessier. Rede und Antwort. Übungen zum dialogischen Ausdruck. (with cassette) Coauthor: Chr. Tessier. Ismaning: Hueber Verlag. ISBN 3-19-001482-5
- (1970) Sakayan, Dora and Zaruhi Svazlian. Մեթոդական ուղեցույց գերմաներենի 5րդ դասարանի դասագրքի համար (A Methodological Guide for the use of the German textbook for the 5th grade). Yerevan: Louys Press.
- (1970) Sakayan, Dora and Zaruhi Svazlian. Deutsch für die 6. Klasse. (German for the 6th grade of Armenian secondary schools). Coauthor: Z. Svazlian. Yerevan: Louys Press, 1970 (1st ed.), 1972 (2nd ed.), 1973 (3rd ed.).
- (1969) Sakayan, Dora and Zaruhi Svazlian. Deutsch für die 5. Klasse (German for the 5th grade of Armenian secondary schools). Yerevan: Louys Press, 1969 (1st ed.), 1971 (2nd ed.), 1973 (3rd ed).
- (1968) Sakayan, Dora. Deutsches Lesebuch. [An anthology of German literary]. Yerevan State University Press, 1968 (1st ed.), 1972 (2nd ed.).
- (1968) Sakayan, Dora. Lies Deutsch, Erzähl Deutsch! (A reader for Armenian secondary schools with German-Armenian commentary and glossary.) Yerevan: Louys Press.
- (1967) Sakayan, Dora. Deutsches Lesebuch. [An anthology of literary texts for graduate students in philology, with German-Armenian commentary and glossary]. Yerevan: University Press, 1967 (1st ed.), 1972 (2nd ed.).

=== Translations ===
- (2017) Sakayan, Dora. «Man treibt sie in die Wüste»: Clara und Fritz Sigrist-Hilty als Augenzeugen des Völkermordes an den Armeniern 1915–1918 Translated from German into Eastern Armenian by Dora Sakayan, Yerevan State University Press.
- (2016) Avetik Isahakian, Lilith. Bilingual and illustrated edition, translation from Eastern Armenian to English by Dora Sakayan. Montreal, Arod Books.
- (2011) Jakob Künzler, Im Lande des Blutes und der Tränen. Zürich: Chronos 1999/2004. [English Edition: In the Land of Blood and Tears, Massachusetts 2007]. Translated from German into East Armenian by Dora Sakayan and Evelina Makarian Յակոբ Քյունցլեր, Արյան և արցունքի երկրում, Yerevan State University Press. ISBN 978-5-8084-1518-8
- (2010) Wilhelm Baum, Die Türkei und ihre christlichen Minderheiten, Klagenfurt-Wien: Kitab 2005 [English edition: The Christian Minorities in Turkey, Klagenfurt: Kitab 2006]. Transla¬ted from German into Eastern Armenian by Dora Sakayan and Evelina Makarian (Վիլհելմ Բաում, Թուրքիան և նրա քրիստոնյա փոքրամասնությունները), Yerevan State University Press. ISBN 978-5-8084-1277-4
- (2008) Jakob Künzler, Dreissig Jahre Dienst am Orient [Thirty Years of Service in the Orient] Basel 1933, Translated from German into East Armenian by Dora Sakayan and Evelina Makarian (Յակոբ Քյունցլեր, Երեսուն տարի ծառայություն Արևելքում), Yerevan State University Press. ISBN 978-5-8084-1026-8
- (2008) Günther Fuchs/Hans-Ulrich Lüdemann, Mördermord [The Murder of a Murderer], Rostock 2002. Translated into East Armenian by Dora Sakayan and Evelina Makarian (Գյունթեր Ֆուքս/Հանս Ուլրիխ Լյուդեման, Մարդասպանի սպանությունը), Yerevan State University Press. ISBN 978-5-8084-1004-6
- (2006) Dora Sakayan. An Armenian Doctor in Turkey. Montreal: Arod Books, 1997. Translated from English into German by Sakayan. Published in Dora Sakayan (Hg.), Smyrna 1922. Das Tagebuch des Garabed Hatscherian [Smyrna 1922. Garabed Hatcherian's Journal], Klagenfurt: Kitab-Verlag. ISBN 3-902005-87-4
- (1997) Կարապետ Խաչերեան. Զմիւռնիական արկածներս1922-ին [Garabed Hatcherian's journal My Smyrna Ordeal of 1922] Montreal: Arod Books 1997. Translated from Western Armenian into English by Dora Sakayan. Published in Dora Sakayan, An Armenian Doctor in Turkey. Montreal: Arod Books. ISBN 0-9699879-0-0
- (1982) Universal Declaration of Human Rights. Translated into Eastern Armenian by Dora Sakayan, München: Verlag für armenische Fragen. OCLC 909990853
- (1975) Manouk Abeghian (1865–1944) Der armenische Volksglaube [Armenian Folk Beliefs]. Translated from German into East Armenian by Dora Sakayan. In: Collected Works of Manouk Abeghian, Vol. 7. Yerevan: Academy Press.
- (1969) Ruzan Nanumian, «Stepanos Nazarian: Letters», Yerevan: Academy Press 1969. (The Deciphering of Stepanos Nazarian's (1812–1879) German letters from the Gothic handwriting and the preparation of the German texts for publication, as well as the revising of the Armenian translations in R. Nanumian's «Stepanos Nazarian: Letters» by Dora Sakayan).

=== Editions ===
- (2011): (Ed. Sakayan et al.) Sign, System, Communications. Selected Papers dedicated to the Memory of Edward Atayan. (Նշան, համակարգ, հաղորդակցում. Հոդվածների ժողովածու` նվիրված Էդվարդ Աթայանին), Yerevan State University Press.
- (2010): (Ed. Sakayan) ՅՈՒՇԱՐՁԱՆ Ապրիլ 11-ի – MEMORIAL to April 11. Istanbul: Belge International Publishing.
- (2006/2013): (Ed. Sakayan) Smyrna 1922: Das Tagebuch des Garabed Hatscherian. [Smyrna 1922. The diary of Garabed Hatcherian]. Introduction by Tessa Hofmann. Klagenfurt: Kitab-Verlag, 2006. Translated into German by Dora Sakayan. ISBN 978-3-902005-87-8
- (2005): (Ed. Sakayan) Смирна 1922. Дневник Карапета Хачеряна Ереван, ААН, 2005. [Smyrna 1922. The diary of Garabed Hatcherian. Yerevan, Academy Press, 2005] Introduction by Tessa Hofmann. Translated into Russian from the English edition by Lusine Engibarian-Hammel. ISBN 99941-39-40-1
- (2005): (Ed. Sakayan) Զմյուռնիա 1922. Բժիշկ Կարապետ Խաչերյանի օրագիրը: [Smyrna 1922. The diary of the physician Garabed Hatcherian], Yerevan, Academy Press, 2005. Introduction by Tessa Hofmann. Transferred into East Armenian by Larissa Gevorkyan. ISBN 99941-39-39-8
- (2005): (Ed. Sakayan) Bir Ermeni Doktorun Yaşadıkları. Garabet Haçeryan’ın Ízmir Güncesi. [An Armenian physician's ordeal. The chronicle of Garabet Hatcherian]. Istanbul: Belge, 2005. Translated from the English edition into Turkish by Atilla Tuygan.
- (2001): (Ed. Sakayan) Μεταξύ πυρός, ξύφους και θαλάσσης. Στην Σμύρνη το 1922 [Between the fire, sword and sea. In Smyrna in 1922]. Montréal: Arod, 2001. Translated from the English edition into Greek by Nakos Protopapas. ISBN 0-9699879-4-3
- (2001): (Ed. Sakayan) Esmirna 1922: Entre el fuego, el sable y el agua. El diario del Dr. Hatcherian 1922 [Between the fire, sword and sea. The Diary of Dr. Hatcherian in 1922]. Montréal: Arod, 2001. Translated from the English edition into Spanish by Juan R. S. Yelanguezian. ISBN 0-9699879-3-5
- (2001): (Ed. Sakayan) Semiotics and Language Teaching. Theoretical Principles and Practical Applications. Selected Papers Presented at the II Conference on Semiotics and Language Teaching Held at Yerevan State University 20–22 May 1996. Ann Arbor: Caravan Books. ISBN 0-88206-103-8
- (2000): (Ed. Sakayan) Smyrne 1922: Entre le feu, le glaive et l’eau. Les épreuves d’un médecin arménien [Between the fire, sword and sea. An Armenian physician's ordeal]. Paris: L’Harmattan, 2000. Translated from English edition into French by Ethel Groffier. ISBN 2-7475-0046-2
- (1997): (Ed. Sakayan) An Armenian Doctor in Turkey: Garabed Hatcherian, My Smyrna Ordeal of 1922. Dr. G. Hatcherian's journal is translated from the original into English by Dora Sakayan. This volume contains an introduction, 62 annotations, an afterword, photos, a bibliography. Montreal: Arod Books. ISBN 978-0-9699879-1-8
- (1995/1997): (Ed. Sakayan) Տօքթ. Կարապետ Խաչերեանի օրագիրը. Զմիւռնիական արկածներս 1922-ին [The Diary of Dr. Garabed Hatcherian. My Smyrna Ordeal of 1922]. Editor: Dora Sakayan. Montreal: Arod Books. ISBN 978-0-9699879-0-1
- (1996): (Ed. Sakayan) Proceedings of the Fifth International Conference on Armenian Linguistics, May 1–5, 1995, Montreal, Quebec, Canada. Delmar & New York: Caravan Books. ISBN 0-88206-085-6

== Awards and distinctions ==
- October 23, 2019: The “Aurora Mardiganian” commemorative medal for significant contributions to the awareness and recognition of the Armenian Genocide, The Armenian Genocide Museum-Institute, Yerevan, Armenia.
- May 17–18, 2016: “Contemporary Linguistics in the Light of Interdisciplinarity”, An International Conference, dedicated to Dora Sakayan on her 85th Birthday Anniversary, Yerevan State University, Armenia.
- September 27, 2012: Degree of Honorary Doctor of Yerevan State University “For her public and patriotic activities and outstanding achievements in Armenian Studies."
- November 6, 2011: Gold Medal of Armenia's Science and Education Ministry "For outstanding contributions to science and education."
- October 26, 2011: Certificate of Distinction by the Ministry of Diaspora of Armenia.
- June 2, 2008: Certificate of Recognition for the book Eastern Armenian for the English-speaking World, “...a valuable contribution to the study of Armenia and its culture.” The Certificate of Recognition was issued by the California State Assembly, forty-third District.
- October 9, 2005: Saint Sahak - Saint Mesrop Medal of Honor of the Mother See of Holy Etchmiadzin, Armenia, for decades of scholarly and pedagogical services in Armenia and Canada.
- October 20, 2002: Outstanding Citizenship Award by the Montreal Citizenship Council.
- June 28, 2001: Bundesverdienstkreuz, Federal Republic of Germany (the Cross of the Order of Merit) for 50 years of contributions to the German language and culture.
- May 20–22, 1996: “Semiotics and Language Teaching. Theoretical Principles and Practical Applications,” An International Conference dedicated to Dora Sakayan on her 65th Birthday Anniversary as a special tribute to her contributions to the field of Linguistics and Armenology), Yerevan State University, Armenia.
- October 1967: Certificate of Distinction awarded by the Supreme Soviet of the Armenian SSR for Excellence in Scholarship and Education: «Հայկական Հանրապետության Գերագույն Սովետի Պատվոգիր».
