= Öget Öktem Tanör =

Turkish neuropsychologist (born 1935

- Born: May 31, 1935 (age 91); Turkey
- Occupation: Neuropsychologist
- Partner: Bülent Tanör
- Parent: İbrahim Öktem

Öget Öktem Tanör (born May 31, 1935) is the first neuropsychologist from Turkey. In 2017, she was charged with "terrorism propaganda" by the Turkish government for signing a petition calling on the government to halt its military operations in the Kurdish-populated areas of the country.

== Career ==
In a 2016 interview, Tanör stated that she had been interested in psychology and neurology since she was 15 years old. She said that she faced opposition from her family when she expressed a desire to study medicine; they put pressure on her to study law instead. According to her, experiences at Columbia Law School and Geneva University helped her turn to psychology. She completed her PhD in 1981, and began working in Ankara in 1983.

Considered "Turkey's first neuropsychologist," Tanör founded Turkey's first neuropsychology clinic. Currently an emeritus professor at Istanbul University, Tanör has also been a guest lecturer at many other institutions. She has been described as one of Turkey's most respected scholars, while her students have referred to her as "a hard-working, colourful character [who] is tireless when it comes to teaching and sharing her knowledge and experiences."

== Terrorism charges ==
Tanör fled the country with her husband Bülent Tanör, a professor of law, during the military coup of 1971, but returned to the country to teach. She has been charged with "terrorism propaganda" by the government of Recep Tayyip Erdoğan, as a result of signing a petition asking the government to halt its military operations in the Kurdish part of Turkey. She was also threatened with the loss of her pension. She is not permitted to travel abroad, and no longer has the rights she once did as a civil servant. Tanör was one of hundreds of academics, and of nearly 100,000 civil servants, who were purged following the 2016 Turkish coup d'état attempt. She has stated that her restrictions were part of a government effort to silence opposition, and has expressed disappointment at being unable to teach.

== See also ==
- Article 301 (Turkish Penal Code)
- Human rights in Turkey
