= Deniz Zarakolu =

Son of Ayşe Nur Zarakolu and Ragıp Zarakolu

Deniz Zarakolu is the son of Turkish publishers and human-rights advocates Ayşe Nur Zarakolu and Ragıp Zarakolu. Shortly after his mother's funeral in 2002, Zarakolu was arrested for a speech he gave at the funeral under the country's strict anti-terror law (TMY). The charge, "inciting revenge or hatred, which could cause people to become dangerous for each other" was later dropped. In October 2011, Karakolu was arrested while a PhD student at Bilgi University in Istanbul. The official charge was "leadership of an armed organisation" and was in conjunction with a series of arrests of pro-Kurdistan intellectuals in Istanbul.
