= Law on crimes committed against Atatürk =

Turkish law

Law No. 5816
- Long title: Law on Crimes Committed Against Atatürk
- Territorial extent: Turkey
- Passed: July 25, 1951
- Effective: July 31, 1951
- Status: In force

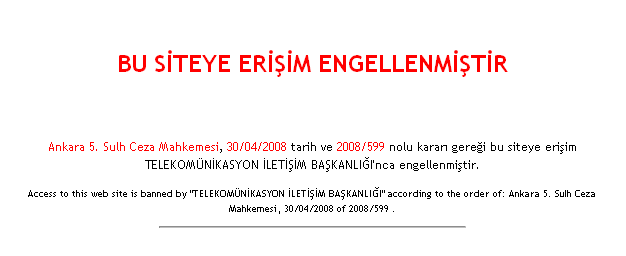
Access to YouTube was blocked from 2007 to 2010 under the Law No. 5816

The Law on Crimes Committed Against Atatürk, or the Law No. 5816, also colloquially known as the law on the protection of Atatürk, is a lèse-majesté law of the Republic of Turkey adopted on July 25, 1951. Its subject is the crimes to be committed, or have been committed, against the founder and first President of the country, Mustafa Kemal Atatürk.

It was proposed (and passed) by the ruling Democrat Party due to the increase in attacks on Atatürk's statues and busts.

Within the framework of this law, access to YouTube, GeoCities, and many blog sites from Turkey was blocked in 2007. In November 2010, Google removed videos from YouTube after a German company claimed that some of its copyrights were violated in the videos in question on YouTube (which also contained insults against Atatürk). Thereupon, the relevant Turkish court lifted the access barrier that was imposed on YouTube. However, after a short time, the company's claims were unfounded, and the videos in question were republished on the site; however, Turkish courts did not take a decision to block access again.

In 2010, Reporters Without Borders argued that Law No. 5816 violated freedom of expression, one of the basic tenets of the European Union, and that it contravened international laws on human rights.

== Sections ==
1. Anyone who publicly insults or swears at the memory of Atatürk is punished with imprisonment from one year to three years.
  Anyone who destroys, breaks, spoils or pollutes statues, busts and monuments representing Atatürk or Atatürk's tomb is sentenced to a heavy prison sentence from one year to five years.
  Anyone who encourages others to commit the crimes written in the paragraphs above is to be punished as the main perpetrator.
2. If the crimes listed in the first article are committed by two or more persons collectively in public or public places or by means of the press, the penalty to be imposed is increased by half. If the crimes listed in the second paragraph of the first article are committed by force or an attempt is made to be committed in this way, the penalty to be imposed is doubled.
3. Prosecution is made ex officio by the Public Prosecutor's Office for the crimes written in this Law.
4. This Law enters into force on the date of its publication.
5. The Minister of Justice enforces this Law.

== See also ==
- Lèse-majesté
- Article 299 (Turkish Penal Code)
- Article 301 (Turkish Penal Code)
