= Kemal Kerinçsiz =

Turkish lawyer (born 1960)

Kemal Kerinçsiz (born 20 February 1960, in Edirne, Turkey) is a Turkish nationalist lawyer, famous for filing complaints against more than 40 Turkish journalists and authors (including Orhan Pamuk, Elif Şafak, and the late Hrant Dink) for "insulting Turkishness". He heads the Büyük Hukukçular Birliği ("Great Union of Jurists"), which is responsible for most Article 301 trials.

He was detained while preparing the defense of retired captain Muzaffer Tekin, who was also detained in the same investigation during the Ergenekon case operation on January 22, 2008. He was arrested 6 days after his detention. On 5 August 2013, Kerinçsiz was sentenced to aggravated life imprisonment as part of the Ergenekon trials. He was released together with several other suspects in March 2014.
