= Mehmet Abbasoğlu =

Kurdish politician in Turkey

- Born: Mehmet Tongac; 1955; Büyükkadikoy, Diyarbakır, Turkey
- Died: June 5, 2015 (aged 59); Diyarbakır Memorial Hospital, Diyarbakır, Turkey
- Occupation: Politician
- Office: Leader of DEHAP
- Political party: Democratic People's Party (DEHAP)
- Spouse: Feride Abbasoglu (m. 1976)

Mehmet Abbasoğlu (born Mehmet Tongac 10 June 1955 – 5 June 2015) was a Kurdish politician and former leader of Democratic People's Party (DEHAP).

== Biography ==
Abbasoğlu was born in Büyükkadikoy in Diyarbakır as the last of 5 children of Abas and Hani Tongac who were originally from Dersim. His father died when he was 6.

He attended the military school when he was 14 and started duty as a sergeant. He married Feride Abbasoglu in 1976. After retiring from army service in 1995 Abbasoğlu became an active member of the People's Democracy Party (HADEP). He founded the Democratic People's Party (DEHAP) in 1997 for the case that the Turkish authorities would ban the HADEP. In the parliamentary election of November 2002 his party won 6.2 of the popular vote. But because of the 10 percent electoral threshold the party could not send representatives to Turkish parliament. After the Constitutional Court banned HADEP in 2003, the DEHAP became the continuation party.

Mehmet Abbasoğlu was sentenced to 1 year 11 Months in prison in 2003 by Turkish courts for an alleged false documentation of DEHAP to the High Electoral Committee. He was imprisoned between October 2003 and August 2004.

After released from prison in 2005 Abbasoğlu returned to politics and served in the Municipality Committee of the Peace and Democracy Party (BDP). On 14 April 2009 he was arrested along with several other politicians by the Turkish authorities and prosecuted for his involvement in the Kurdistan Communities Union (KCK). He was released pending trial in 2014 after 5 years.

He returned to his job in Municipality Committee and continued to work until he was diagnosed with lung cancer in April 2015. After his cancer diagnosis, despite efforts, he died in Diyarbakir Memorial Hospital on 5 June 2015. After his remains was brought from Diyarbakır to Tunceli (also known as Dersim), an Alevi ceremony was held before he was buried in the Asri Cemetery.
