= Ferdinand van Ingen =

Dutch scholar of Germanistics (1933–2021)

Ferdinand Jacobus van Ingen (8 December 1933 – 27 February 2021) was a Dutch scholar of Germanistics and a professor of German literature at the Vrije Universiteit Amsterdam from 1972 to 1998.

== Life ==
Van Ingen was born on 8 December 1933 in Maartensdijk. He studied German studies, literary science, art history and musicology at Utrecht University, the Free University of Berlin and LMU Munich. He obtained his PhD from Utrecht University in 1962.

From 1957 to 1962, he was a scientific assistant at the Institute for German Language and Literature in Utrecht. In 1964, Van Ingen became a lecturer at the Vrije Universiteit Amsterdam. In 1970, he became an associate professor and a full professor for new German literature in 1973. He retired in 1998.

Van Ingen published on German and Dutch literature of the 17th century. He was known for his work on the Baroque time and contributed to expanding the Herzog August Library in Wolfenbüttel. Van Ingen was elected a member of the Royal Netherlands Academy of Arts and Sciences in 1978.

He died in Zeist on 27 February 2021.
