= Article 301 of the Turkish Penal Code =

Law penalizing insults to Turkey

Article 301 is a lèse-majesté law of the Turkish Penal Code making it illegal to insult Turkey, the Turkish nation, the Turkish government institutions, or Turkish national heroes such as Mustafa Kemal Atatürk. It took effect on June 1, 2005, and was introduced as part of a package of penal law reform in the process preceding the opening of negotiations for Turkish membership of the European Union (EU). The original version of the article made it a crime to "insult Turkishness"; on April 30, 2008, the article was amended to change "Turkishness" into "the Turkish nation". Since this article became law, charges have been brought in more than 60 cases, some of which are high-profile.

On April 30, 2008 a series of changes were made to Article 301, including a new amendment which makes it obligatory to receive the approval of the Minister of Justice to file a case. This change was made to prevent the possible misuse of the article, especially against high-profile cases, addressing legal holes in the previous version.

The Great Jurists Union (Turkish: Büyük Hukukçular Birliği) headed by Kemal Kerinçsiz, a Turkish lawyer, is "behind nearly all of Article 301 trials." Kerinçsiz himself is responsible for forty of the trials, including the high-profile ones.

== Text ==
The article currently reads as follows:

1. A person who publicly denigrates the Turkish Nation, the State of the Turkish Republic or the Grand National Assembly of Turkey and the judicial institutions of the State shall be punishable by imprisonment from 6 months to 2 years.
2. A person who publicly denigrates the military and police organizations of the State will too receive the same punishment.
3. Expressions of thought intended to criticize shall not constitute a crime.
4. The prosecution under this article will require the approval of the Minister of Justice.

Before amendments were made to Article 301 on April 30, 2008, the article stated the following:

1. A person who publicly denigrates Turkishness, the Republic or the Grand National Assembly of Turkey, shall be punishable by imprisonment of between six months and three years.
2. A person who publicly denigrates the Government of the Republic of Turkey, the judicial institutions of the State, the military or security organizations shall be punishable by imprisonment of between six months and two years.
3. In cases where denigration of Turkishness is committed by a Turkish citizen in another country the punishment shall be increased by one third.
4. Expressions of thought intended to criticize shall not constitute a crime.

=== Precursor ===
Before the current Turkish Penal Code took effect, article 159 of the Turkish Penal Code dated 1926 covered the same offense. Among the earliest uses of article 159 was in 1928, when a number of Jews were convicted of "denigrating Turkishness" in the Elza Niego affair.

Article 159 was amended a few times, including in 1961 and 2003, before finally being replaced by the current article 301 in 2005.

== High-profile cases ==
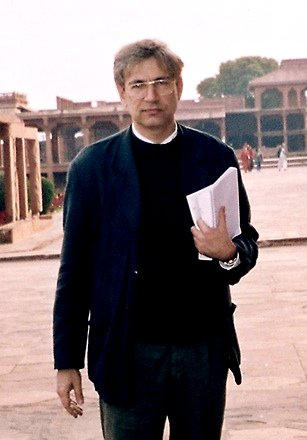
Turkish writer Orhan Pamuk was brought to trial regarding statements about the Armenian genocide.

Article 301 has been used to bring charges against writer Orhan Pamuk for stating, in an interview with Swiss magazine Das Magazin, a weekly supplement to a number of Swiss daily newspapers, including the Tages-Anzeiger, that "Thirty thousand Kurds have been killed here, and a million Armenians. And almost nobody dares to mention that. So I do." The charges, which were brought against Pamuk upon a complaint filed by Kemal Kerinçsiz, were later dropped after the Justice Ministry refused to issue a ruling as to whether the charges should stand.

In February 2006 the trial opened against five journalists charged with insulting the judicial institutions of the State under Article 301, and also of aiming to prejudice a court case under Article 288 of the Turkish Penal Code. Each of the five had criticized a court order to shut down a conference in Istanbul about the Ottoman Armenian casualties in the Ottoman Empire during the First World War. (The conference was nevertheless eventually held after having been transferred from a state university to a private university.) The charges carried a potential penalty of a prison term of up to 10 years. The court dropped the charges against four of them on April 11, 2006 when it was determined that the time allowed by the statute of limitation had been exceeded, while Murat Belge, the fifth, was acquitted on June 8, 2006.

Another high-profile case to result from this legislation involved the writer and journalist Perihan Mağden, who was prosecuted for penning an article originally published in the December 26, 2005 issue of Yeni Aktuel, titled "Conscientious Objection is a Human Right". The Turkish military filed a complaint against her in response. In the trial, which took place on July 27, 2006, she was acquitted when the court ruled that her opinions were covered by the freedom of expression and were not a crime under the Turkish Penal Code. If convicted she could have faced three years' imprisonment.

In July 2006 the Istanbul public prosecutor's office prepared an indictment alleging that the statements in the book Manufacturing Consent by Noam Chomsky and Edward S. Herman constituted a breach of the article. The publisher and editors of the Turkish translation, as well as the translator, were brought to trial accordingly, but acquitted in December 2006.

In 2006 Elif Şafak also faced charges of "insulting Turkishness" in her novel, The Bastard of Istanbul. The case was thrown out by the judge after a demand by the prosecutor for the case to be dropped.

In 2006, Armenian-Turkish journalist Hrant Dink was prosecuted under the Article 301 for insulting Turkishness, and received a six-month suspended sentence. On 19 January 2007, he was assassinated by Ogün Samast. Orhan Pamuk declared, "In a sense, we are all responsible for his death. However, at the very forefront of this responsibility are those who still defend article 301 of the Turkish Penal Code. Those who campaigned against him, those who portrayed this sibling of ours as an enemy of Turkey, those who painted him as a target, they are the most responsible in this." Hrant Dink was posthumously acquitted of the charges on June 14, 2007, in a retrial ordered by the Court of Appeals. In Dink v. Turkey, the European Court of Human Rights ruled that Dink's freedom of speech, among other things, had been violated by the Turkish government.

Publisher Ragıp Zarakolu was on trial under Article 301 as well as for "insulting the legacy of Atatürk" under Law 5816 from 2006 till 2008. In June 2008, Zarakolu was found guilty of "insulting the institutions of the Turkish Republic" under Article 301 for translating and publishing a book about the Armenian genocide. The judge sentenced him to five months in prison or paying a fine.

In 2007, Arat Dink (Hrant Dink's son) and Serkis Seropyan were convicted to one-year suspended sentences under Article 301 for printing Dink's words that the killings of Armenians in 1915 was a genocide.

Finding a violation of freedom of expression (Article 10 of ECHR) in the investigation against Altuğ Taner Akçam, a historian writing about the Armenian genocide. Concerning the 2008 amendments, ECHR noted that "despite the replacement of the term "Turkishness" by "the Turkish Nation", there seems to be no change or major difference in the interpretation of these concepts because they have been understood in the same manner by the Court of Cassation".

== Other high-profile incidents ==
In December 2005 Joost Lagendijk, a member of the Dutch GreenLeft party and the European Parliament's Committee on Foreign Affairs, chairman of the EU-Turkey Joint Parliamentary Committee, and a staunch supporter of Turkish EU membership, visited Turkey to attend the trial against Orhan Pamuk. In his speech he commented on the Şemdinli incident and criticized the Turkish military for seeking to maintain its political influence through the continuous guerrilla war with the PKK. The Great Jurists Union (Turkish: Büyük Hukukçular Birliği), the same group that filed a complaint against Orhan Pamuk, filed charges against Joost Lagendijk for violating Article 301 by insulting the Turkish army. The prosecutor, however, declined to prosecute, referring to the Turkish constitution and the European Convention on Human Rights, as well as a judgement by the European Court of Human Rights concerning the interpretation of that Convention.

In 2007, Members of the Strong Turkey Party organized a campaign of civil disobedience against the law, which they named Judge me too 301 (Turkish: Beni de yargıla 301). 301 members of the party knowingly violated the article 301 and filed complaints against themselves. The prosecutor refused to file charges.

== Criticism and impact of the article ==
The article has been heavily criticized, both in Turkey and outside. A criticism heard in Turkey, and also voiced by some outside, is that it has turned into a tool of the nationalist "old guard", who, so is claimed, use it to press charges against people of international renown, not to stifle dissenting opinions but with the aim of thwarting the admission process to the EU. Novelist Elif Şafak claims the Article has a chilling effect on free expression, notwithstanding its fourth clause.

Amnesty International states that "Article 301 poses a direct threat to freedom of expression, as enshrined in Article 19 of the International Covenant on Civil and Political Rights (ICCPR) and in Article 10 of the European Convention for the Protection of Human Rights and Fundamental Freedoms (ECHR)."

Prosecutions under the article have raised issues with the accession of Turkey to the European Union, because it limits freedom of speech.

== Current status ==
Following the murder of Hrant Dink, Turkish deputy prime minister and foreign minister Abdullah Gül declared, "With its current state, there are certain problems with article 301. We see now that there are changes which must be made to this law."

On April 30, 2008, article 301 was amended by the Parliament of Turkey, with the following changes:

- replacement of the word "Turkishness" with the phrase "the Turkish Nation" (so "denigration of Turkishness" became "denigration of the Turkish Nation");
- reduction of the maximum penalty from three years to two;
- removal of the special provision aggravating the punishment for denigration when committed by a Turkish citizen in another country;
- requiring permission of the justice ministry to file a case. The permission procedure of Article 301 will be carried out by the Directorate General of the Criminal Affairs of the Ministry of Justice where competent judges are seconded to the Ministry. Even if a criminal investigation is launched upon the permission of the Minister of Justice, the prosecutor still has discretionary power to decide not to prosecute.

Permission was refused by the justice ministry in the July 2008 case against İbrahim Tığ, the editor of the daily Bölge Haber. The governor of Zonguldak filed a complaint citing "open denigration of the government" ("T.C. Hükümetini Alenen Aşağılamak") after Tığ wrote a column accusing the ruling Justice and Development Party of selling the country's assets through privatization. As of July 2008, six of the seven article 301 cases that have been considered by the ministry were rejected for prosecution.

According to the Turkish legal system, international conventions on human rights automatically become part of the national legal order without additional transposition once they are ratified by the Parliament. International human rights instruments to which Turkey is party have to be taken into consideration by judges and prosecutors.

In 2011, the European Court of Human Rights decided that "the scope of the terms under Article 301 of the Criminal Code, as interpreted by the judiciary, is too wide and vague and thus the provision constitutes a continuing threat to the exercise of the right to freedom of expression" and "that Article 301 of the Criminal Code does not meet the "quality of law" required by the Court’s settled case-law, since its unacceptably broad terms result in a lack of foreseeability as to its effects".

== See also ==
- Censorship in Turkey
- Enemy of the people
- Enemy of the state
- Freedom of religion in Turkey
- Human rights in Turkey
- Insult of officials and the state
- International Freedom of Expression Exchange
- List of prosecuted Turkish writers
- Lèse-majesté
- "I Apologize" campaign
