= Pontos Kültürü =

1996 book by Ömer Asan

- Author: Ömer Asan
- Publication date: 1996

Pontos Kültürü or Pontos Culture is a 1996 book by Turkish author Ömer Asan about the pontic Greek Muslims of Trabzon Province.

Pontos Kültürü documents Asan's ethnographic fieldwork in his native village Çoruk (Τσορούκ, official name "Erenköy") in Of district. It contains a rich collection of oral traditions, local legends (such as Ancomah), and documentation of elements of material culture in Çoruk and its vicinity. The book is also a study of Pontic in its Of dialect. As the author asserts in its foreword, "the book does not reach the Pontos Culture but approaches it." In its entirety, the book is also a polemical text against the mainstream nationalist currents of folklore and historiography that are dominant in Turkey.

In January 2002, following a programme televised on the Turkish TV ATV, the book became the centre of controversy. Asan, accused of treason by nationalistic circles, was threatened by supporters of MHP. The book was banned the same month due to a verdict by the State Security Court in Istanbul. Asan was charged with violating the Anti-Terrorism Law by "propagandating separatism". The author, the book, and the publisher were eventually acquitted in 2003.

== Bibliography ==
- Ömer Asan, Pontos Kültürü 'Pontos Culture', Belge Yayınları of Ragip Zarakolu, 1996. Second edition, 2000 (ISBN 975-344-220-3).
- --, Ο Πολιτισμóς του Πóντου, Kyriakidis Publishers, Thessaloniki, 1997. (translation of the above)
