= Democratic People's Party (Turkey) =

Democratic People's Party Kurdish: Partiya Gel a Demokratîk Turkish: Demokratik Halk Partisi
- Chairperson: Veysi Aydin (1998); Mehmet Abbasoğlu (1998–2003); Tuncer Bakırhan (2003–2005)
- Founded: 24 October 1997
- Dissolved: 17 August 2005
- Preceded by: People's Democracy Party
- Merged into: Democratic Society Party
- Succeeded by: Participatory Democracy Party; Rights and Freedoms Party
- Ideology: Kurdish nationalism Democratic socialism Left-wing nationalism
- Political position: Left-wing
- Colors: Red, Orange or Yellow

The Democratic People's Party (Turkish: Demokratik Halk Partisi, DEHAP) was a pro-Kurdish political party in Turkey.

== Founding and political context ==
DEHAP was founded 24 October 1997.

It was the continuation of the People's Democracy Party (HADEP), which was banned in March 2003 by the Constitutional Court on the grounds that it supported the Kurdistan Workers Party (PKK). On the 26th of March, 2003, 35 Mayors who were part of the HADEP joined the DEHAP. The party had three chairmen. The party was at first presided by Veysi Aydin, who was elected on the parties first ordinary congress in January 1998. After his membership was revoked by the Turkish Supreme Court, he was replaced by Mehmet Abbasoğlu at the first extraordinary congress of the party in May 1998. In the second extraordinary party congress in June 2003, Tuncer Bakırhan was elected its president.

== Electoral results ==
At its last legislative elections in November 2002, the party won 6.2% of the popular vote, thus not reaching the 10% threshold for gaining representation in the Grand National Assembly of Turkey. For the local elections in March 2004, the DEHAP, together with the Labour Party (EMEP), the Freedom and Solidarity Party (ÖDP), and the Socialist Democracy Party (SDP), entered an electoral alliance under the name of the Social Democrat People's Party (SHP) Following the elections, 56 elected mayors returned to the DEHAP. It signed a declaration which demanded the PKK to lay down its arms together with 150 Turkish intellectuals.

== Merger and dissolution ==
On the 17th of August, 2005, DEHAP announced its merger with the Democratic Society Movement (DTH) founded by Leyla Zana to form the Democratic Society Party (DTP). In November 2005, it announced that it has dissolved itself.
