= Ömer Asan =

Turkish folklorist, photographer and writer (born 1961)

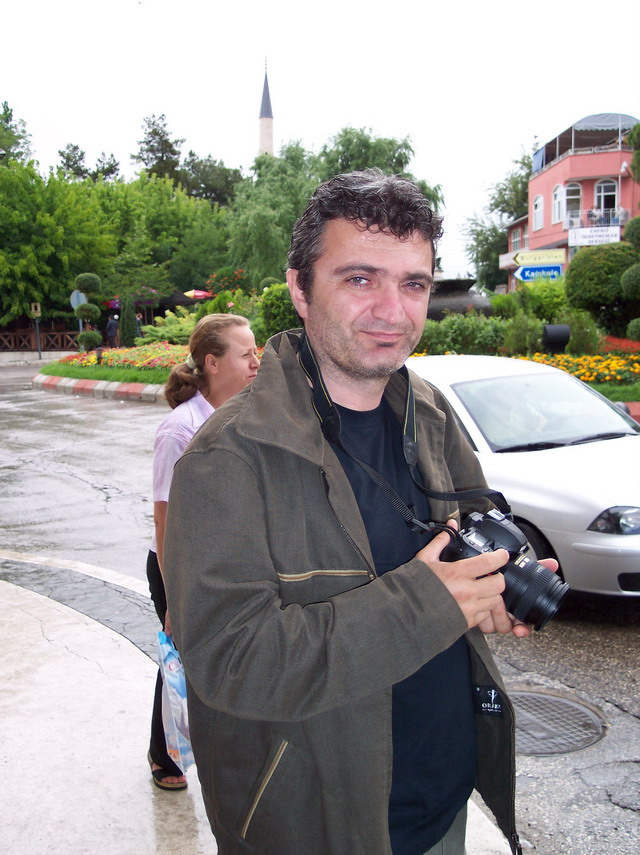
Ömer Asan, 2005, in Edirne

Ömer Asan (born May 28, 1961) is a Turkish folklorist, photographer and writer.

In 2002, he was charged with allegations that he violated Article 8 of Turkey's Anti-Terror Law by "propagandating separatism" for his book Pontos Kültürü. In 2003, Article 8 was abolished, and Asan was acquitted as a result.

His articles, stories and research studies have been published in Radikal, Sabah and Milliyet newspapers, Gezi, Yaşasın Edebiyat, Adam Öykü and Kafkasya Yazıları, Sky Life.

Asan was born in Trabzon, Turkey.

== Publications ==
- Pontos Kültürü (1996), in Turkish, ISBN 975-344-220-3
- Hasan İzzettin Dinamo (2000), biography
- Niko'nun kemençesi (2005), short stories

== Awards ==
- Abdi İpekçi, Peace and Friendship Award presented by Turkish-Greek Friendship Association for his article published in Milliyet newspaper.

== See also ==
- Pontic language
- Trabzon
- Pontian Greeks
- Greek Muslims
