= Ragıp Zarakolu =

Turkish human rights activist

- Born: 1948 (age 77–78); Büyükada, Turkey Swedish
- Occupation: Human rights activist
- Spouses: Ayşe Nur Zarakolu (m. 1970; died 2002) Katherine Holle (m. 2004)

Ragıp Zarakolu (born 1948) is a Turkish human rights activist and publisher who has long faced legal harassment for publishing books on controversial subjects in Turkey, especially on minority and human rights in Turkey.

== Biography ==
Ragıp Zarakolu was born in 1948 on Büyükada close to Istanbul. At that time his father, Remzi Zarakolu, was the district governor on that island. Ragıp Zarakolu grew up with members of the Greek and Armenian minority in Turkey. In 1968 he began writing for Ant and Yeni Ufuklar magazines.

In 1971 a military junta assumed power in Turkey. Ragıp Zarakolu was tried on charges of secret relations to Amnesty International. He spent five months in prison, before the charges were dropped. In 1972 Ragıp Zarakolu was sentenced to 2 years' imprisonment for his article in the journal Ant (Pledge) on Ho Chi Minh and the Vietnam War. He stayed in Selimiye Prison (Istanbul) and was released in 1974 following a general amnesty. On his release Zarakolu refused to abandon his campaign for freedom of thought, striving for an "attitude of respect for different thoughts and cultures to become widespread in Turkey".

The Belge Publishing House, established in Istanbul in 1977 by Zarakolu and his wife Ayşenur, has been a focus for Turkish censorship laws ever since. Charges brought against the couple resulted in imprisonment for both Ayşenur and Ragıp Zarakolu, the wholesale confiscation and destruction of books and the imposition of heavy fines.

In 1979 Ragıp Zarakolu was one of the founders of the daily newspaper Demokrat and took responsibility for the news desk on foreign affairs. The paper was banned with the military coup of 12 September 1980 and Ragıp Zarakolu was shortly imprisoned in 1982 in connection with this position in Demokrat. He was banned from leaving the country between 1971 and 1991. In 1986 he became one of 98 founders of the Human Rights Association of Turkey (HRA or in Turkish IHD). For some time Ragıp Zarakolu chaired the Writers in Prison Committee of International PEN in Turkey. Currently (beginning of 2007) he chairs the Committee for Freedom of Publication in the Union of Publishers.

Until the military coup of 12 September 1980 Belge Publishing House mostly published academic and theoretical books. Afterwards Belge started to publish a series of books written by political prisoners. The series of 35 books consisted of poems, shorts stories, novels. The list of publications (see a list of selected publications below) include more than 10 books (translations) of Greek literature, 10 books on the Armenian Question and five books related to the Jews in Turkey. There are also a number of books dealing with the Kurds in Turkey.

He also has published several books on the Armenian genocide, such as George Jerjian's The Truth Will Set Us Free: Armenians and Turks Reconciled and Professor Dora Sakayan's An Armenian Doctor in Turkey: Garabed Hatcherian: My Smyrna Ordeal of 1922 — which brought new criminal charges in 2005. In November 2007 Zarakolu published David Gaunt's book Massacres, resistance, protectors about the Assyrian genocide in Turkish (Katliamlar, Direniş, Koruyucular).

In 1995 the Belge Publishing House offices were firebombed by a far right group, forcing it to be housed in a cellar. Since his wife's death in 2002, Zarakolu continued to face further prosecutions.

In May 2017 the Belge Publishing House was raided by police who said they had orders to seize all copies of the book Stateless Kurds and Decisions Tougher than Death. Police also seized hundreds of books published in the 1980s and 1990s, despite having no orders to do so.

Ragıp Zarakolu is also related to University of Cambridge Professor Ayşe Zarakol.

== Trials ==
Recent court cases against Ragıp Zarakolu and Belge Publishing House (until her death Ayşenur Zarakolu stood trial instead of him) include:

=== 2002 ===
On 21 March Istanbul State Security Court (SSC) No. 1 heard the case of Ayşenur Zarakolu on charges of having disseminated separatist propaganda by publishing a book by Hüseyin Turhallı, former chairman of the Democracy Party (DEP) for Diyarbakır province, entitled Songs of Freedom. During the hearing her husband Ragıp Zarakolu stated that this would have been the 34th court case against his wife, if she had been alive. On 4 June Istanbul SSC dropped the charges against her after establishing that Hüseyin Turhallı was living in France and Ayşenur Zarakolu had died in January.

=== 2003 ===
On 3 December Istanbul SSC acquitted Ragıp Zarakolu from charges under Article 312 TPC. The trial had been opened for his translation of the book The Regime of 12 September on Trial, written by Dr. Gazi Çağlar from Hannover University.

=== 2004 ===
On 10 September, Istanbul Heavy Penal Court No. 14 (former Istanbul SSC No. 4) concluded the case launched against publisher Ragıp Zarakolu, owner of the newspaper Ülkede Özgür Gündem (Free Agenda in the Country), Ali Çelik Kasimogullari and editor-in-chief of the newspaper Mehmet Çolak in connection with an article titled Sana Ne (What’s that to you) that was published on 8 March 2003. The court sentenced Kasimogullari to a fine of TL 3.3 billion and Mehmet Çolak to 6 months’ imprisonment and a fine of TL 1.65 billion under Article 7/2 of the LFT (making propaganda for an illegal organization). Çolak’s sentence was commuted to a total fine of TL 3.73 billion. Zarakolu’s file was separated due to legal change made regarding Article 312 TPC. He was to be tried at a Penal Court.

Beyoglu Penal Court No. 2 heard the case on 2 March 2005 and adjourned the hearing to 12 May. Further hearings were held on 21 September and 11 October 2005. Result unknown.

=== Article 301 ===
Ragıp Zarakolu was indicted for the Turkish translation of Professor Dora Sakayan's book entitled An Armenian Doctor in Turkey. G. Hatcherian: My Smyrna Ordeal of 1922. According to the indictment, Zarakolu was to be sentenced following Article 301 new TPC (Article 159 of the former TPC). The first hearing was set for 21 September at Istanbul Penal Court No 2.

On 20 September Istanbul Penal Court No 2 continued to hear the case against Ragıp Zarakolu, owner of Belge Publishing House, in connection with the book about the Armenian genocide entitled The Truth Will Set Us Free written by the British writer George Jerjian. The hearing was adjourned to 22 November for investigation of the expert report. The charges related to Article 301 new TPC (of June 2005). The latest two cases were combined and further hearings were held on 21 November and 15 February, 19 April, 21 June and 14 December 2006. The next hearing was scheduled for 15 March 2007.

In June 2008, Zarakolu was found guilty of "insulting the institutions of the Turkish Republic" under Article 301 of the Turkish penal code for translating and publishing Jerjian's book. The judge sentenced him to five months in prison. However, the judge, citing Zarakolu's "good behavior", stated that the author may avoid imprisonment by paying a fine.

=== KCK case ===
He was taken into custody on October 28, 2011 within the framework of the KCK (Kurdistan Communities Union) operation. In February 2012 Zarakolu was nominated for the Nobel Peace Prize by members of the Swedish Parliament. He was released on April 10, 2012. In 2013, Zarakolu moved to Sweden. In 2020, the European Court of Human Rights ruled that his imprisonment violated his right to liberty and freedom of expression, ordering Turkey to pay him EUR6,500 in non-pecuniary damages.

== Awards for Ragıp and Ayşenur Zarakolu ==
Ragıp Zarakolu was given the NOVIB/PEN Free Expression Award in 2003.

In October 1998 Ayşenur Zarakolu was honoured by the International Publishers Association with the International Freedom to Publish Award. She could not attend the ceremony at Frankfurt Book Fair since her passport had been confiscated.

In September 2008, the same organization awarded Ragıp Zarakolu the 2008 IPA Freedom to Publish Prize (now known as the IPA Prix Voltaire) to "[send] a message to the Turkish authorities that domestic legislation must be further amended to meet international freedom of expression standards".

In March 2012 the Assyrian Culture Centre in Stockholm, Sweden, granted the Assyrian Cultural Award to Ragıp Zarakolu, then in prison, for being an advocate for human and minority rights in Turkey and Europe.
