= World Book Capital =

UNESCO award for cities promoting books

- UNESCO Programme
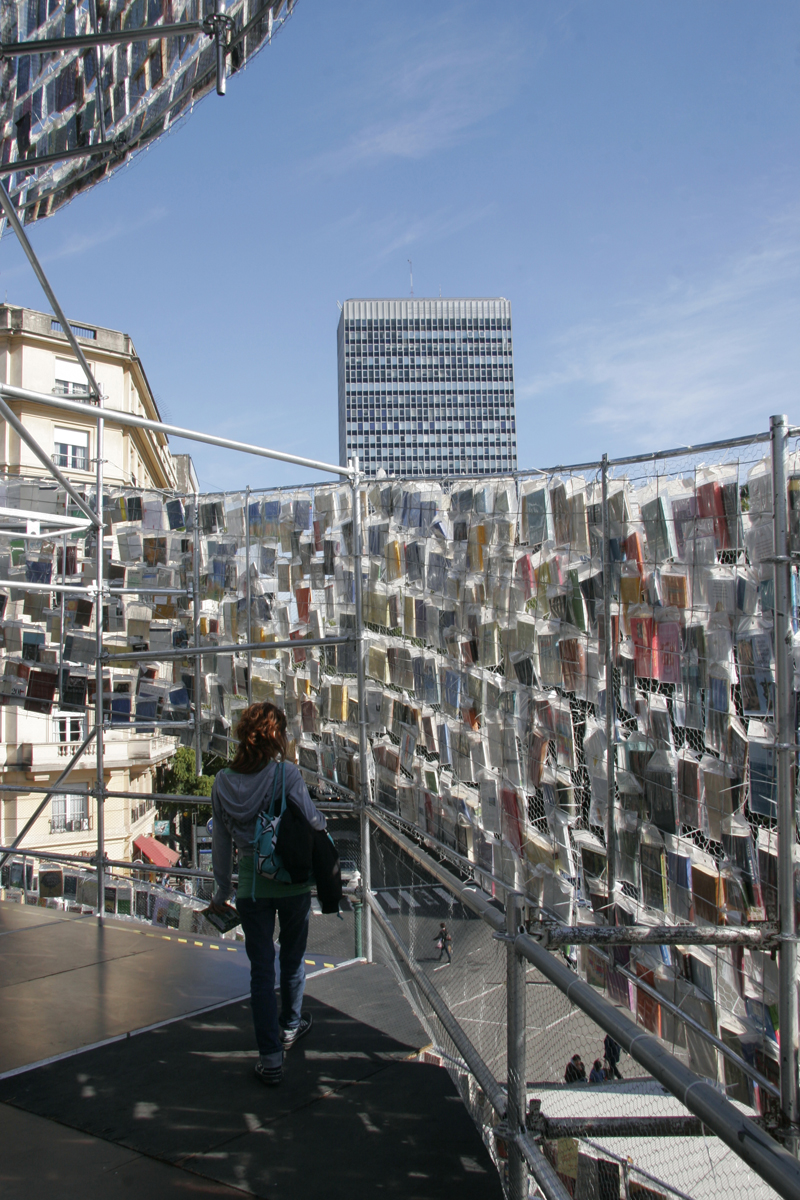
- The Book Tower of Babel during the Buenos Aires 2012 World Book Capital celebration
- Awarded for: Recognition for promoting books and fostering reading
- First award: 2001
- Currently held by: Rabat, Morocco (2026)
- Website: UNESCO World Book Capital

The World Book Capital (WBC) is an initiative of UNESCO which recognises cities for promoting books and fostering reading for a year starting on April 23, World Book and Copyright Day. Cities designated as UNESCO World Book Capital carry out activities with the aim of encouraging a culture of reading in all ages and sharing UNESCO's values. The nomination does not provide a financial prize.

UNESCO adopted the 31c/Resolution 29, in 2001, establishing the World Book Capital programme and naming Madrid as the first WBC city in 2001. The advisory committee is composed of UNESCO, the International Publishers Association, the International Federation of Library Associations and Institutions, the International Authors Forum and the International Booksellers Federation.

== History ==
Six years after the launching of the World Book and Copyright Day (23 April), and following the initiative in Madrid in 2001 to create year-round celebrations around the event, the World Book Capital programme was created. UNESCO invited the professional organisations of the book chain: the International Publishers Association, the International Federation of Library Associations and Institutions and the International Booksellers Federation to create a programme aimed at promoting books during the period between World Book and Copyright Days.

Following a proposal of Spain, supported by many other countries, the UNESCO General Conference decided, on 2 November 2001, that the Organization would grant its moral and intellectual support to the conception and implementation of this initiative, by inviting the international professional organisations of the book chain to work together.

The first UNESCO World Book Capital designated prior to the adoption of 31 C/Resolution 29 was Madrid (Spain) in 2001. An agreement was concluded among the partners that, after Madrid, the subsequent capitals would be Alexandria in 2002 and New Delhi in 2003.

== Activities ==
Cities designated as UNESCO World Book Capital carry out activities with the aim of encouraging a culture of reading and sharing UNESCO's values in all ages and population groups. Through the World Book Capital programme, UNESCO acknowledges the cities commitment for promoting books and fostering reading during a 12 months period. The programme aims to raise awareness for literacy and reading issues, through its numerous activities. World Book Capital brings together the local and national book industries and creates various initiatives with organisations and other stakeholders. The title is also used to draw national and international attention to the literary heritage of a city and nation.

== Nomination ==
=== Nomination process ===
Every year, there is an Open Call for Applications published on the official website of UNESCO. The Open Call for Applications for 2024 was published in February 2022. The nomination does not include any financial prize; it acknowledges the best programmes dedicated to books and reading.

The Director-General of UNESCO is responsible for the designation of the cities following both internal and external consultations with the other members of the Advisory Committee.

The Advisory Committee is made up of one representative of the International Authors Forum (IAF), the International Federation of Library Associations and Institutions (IFLA), the International Publishers Association (IPA) and one UNESCO representative. The committee meets once a year.

To ensure a balanced representation of all regions of the world, the Advisory Committee does not consider consecutive nominations of cities from the same region. Also, the Advisory Committee will only consider an application for a city in a country where another city has been a UNESCO World Book Capital if a period of 10 years or more has elapsed since the previous host city nomination.

=== Nomination criteria ===
The nominating committee accepts programmes presented by or endorsed by the mayor of the city making the application that promote and foster reading. The programmes run from one World Book and Copyright Day and the next. Applicants' programme proposals will be evaluated using six criteria:

1. The submission of an activity programme specifically conceived for the World Book Capital and implemented during the city's term as Capital with long-term benefits for partners and society at large;
2. A general outline of expenses foreseen and fund-raising strategies;
3. The degree of municipal, regional, national and international involvement, including professional and non-governmental organizations, and the foreseeable impact of the programmes;
4. The quantity and quality of one-time or ongoing activities organized by the applicant city in collaboration with national, regional and international professional organizations representing writers, publishers, booksellers and librarians respecting the various players in the book supply chain and in the scientific and literary community;
5. The quantity and quality of any other noteworthy projects promoting and fostering books and reading;
6. Conformity with the principles of freedom of expression, freedom to publish and to distribute information, as stated in the UNESCO Constitution as well as Articles 19 and 27 of the Universal Declaration of Human Rights and by the Agreement on the Importation of Educational, Scientific and Cultural Materials (Florence Agreement), as well as conformity with the UN Charter and relevant UN resolutions.

=== World Book Capital Cities commitment ===
By presenting its application each candidate city commits to:

- Associate UNESCO and the professional organizations represented in the Advisory Committee, in its communication and information campaign by displaying their respective logos, on all publications and on the website dedicated to the UNESCO World Book Capital;
- Provide UNESCO, which will share it with all members of the Advisory Committee, with:
1. An interim report on the activities implemented during the first part of nomination year (23 April – 23 October);
2. A final report on the activities implemented during the entire nomination year (23 April- 22 April of the following year);
- Systematically invite UNESCO and the professional organizations represented in the Advisory Committee to all main events relating to the World Book Capital;
- Produce and circulate information and communication tools on the activity programme to the Advisory Committee members.

UNESCO and the Advisory Committee assist the chosen capital in the planning and implementation of its activity programme during the two years prior to its mandate as World Book Capital. The city is required to facilitate possible evaluation audits implemented on UNESCO's request. If the work doesn't meet the panel's expectations, the Advisory Committee may withdraw the title from the city at any time during the monitoring phase, with one month's notice.

The city authorities also agree to support the administrative work of the World Book Capital Secretariat by gathering financial contributions from potential donors or participating in the development of fundraising strategies.

== Cities designated World Book Capitals ==
The following cities have been designated as World Book Capitals:

Location of the World Book Capitals outside Europe
Location of the World Book Capitals in Europe

Year	City	Country
2001	Madrid	Spain
2002	Alexandria	Egypt
2003	New Delhi	India
2004	Antwerp	Belgium
2005	Montreal	Canada
2006	Turin	Italy
2007	Bogotá	Colombia
2008	Amsterdam	Netherlands
2009	Beirut	Lebanon
2010	Ljubljana	Slovenia
2011	Buenos Aires	Argentina
2012	Yerevan	Armenia
2013	Bangkok	Thailand
2014	Port Harcourt	Nigeria
2015	Incheon	South Korea
2016	Wrocław	Poland
2017	Conakry	Republic of Guinea
2018	Athens	Greece
2019	Sharjah	United Arab Emirates
2020	Kuala Lumpur	Malaysia
2021	Tbilisi	Georgia
2022	Guadalajara	Mexico
2023	Accra	Ghana
2024	Strasbourg	France
2025	Rio de Janeiro	Brazil
2026	Rabat	Morocco
2027	Medellín	Colombia

=== Madrid 2001 ===
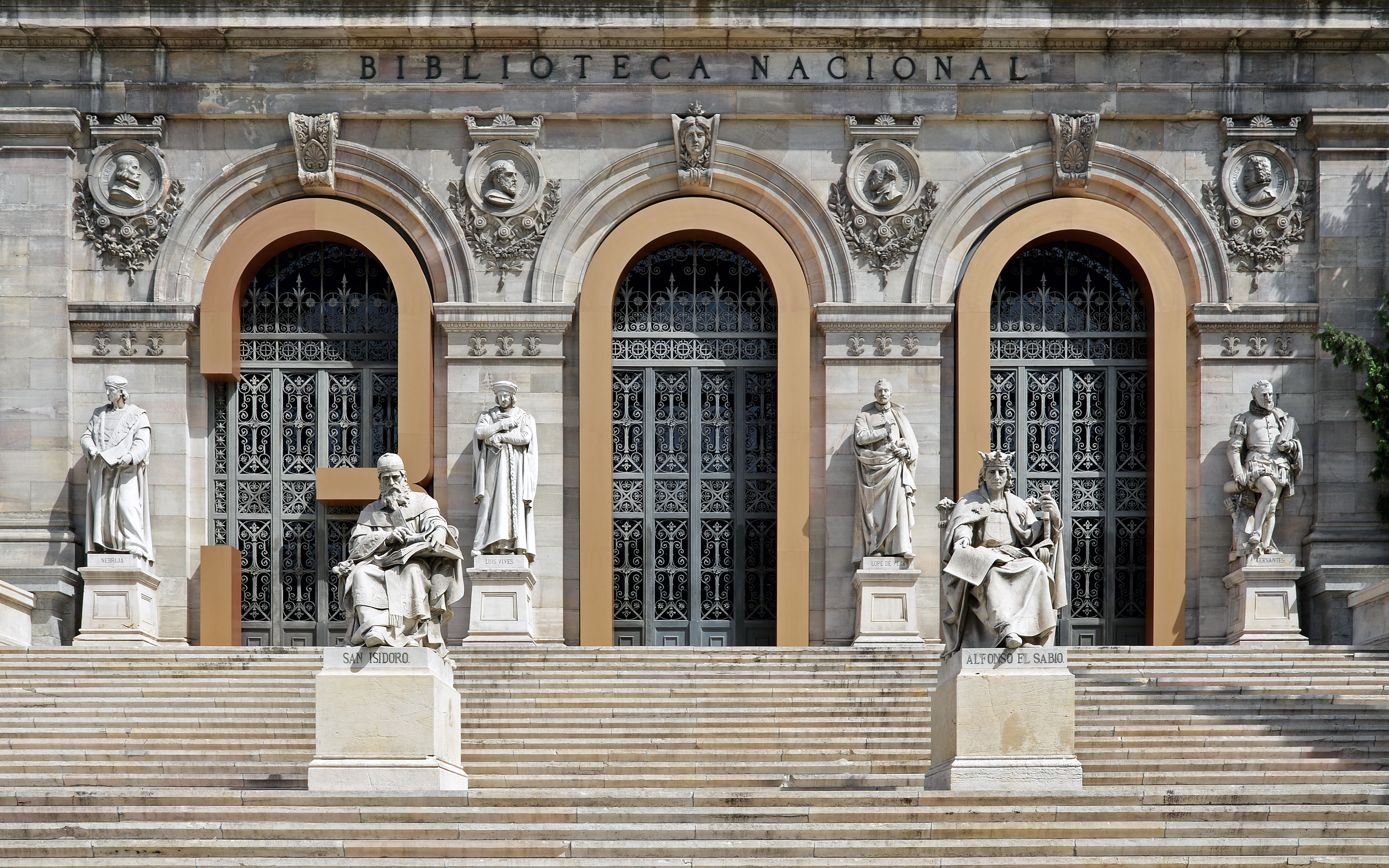
The National Library of Spain.

Madrid was the first city to be awarded the title of the "World Book Capital". The designation aims to promote reading and bring the public closer to the realities of the book industry. The Spanish capital took the initiative of creating this title and its first events.

Numerous activities, around the theme of the popularisation of books and reading, were organised by different companies and organisations that collaborated to support the event:

- The celebration of World Book Day at the Círculo de Bellas Artes
- June Book Fair at the El Retiro Park
- The publication of a guide map of literary Madrid
- Public school reading competition
- The issuance of a commemorative stamp

The existing Spanish book exhibition LIBER used Madrid's World Book Capital status as its theme for the year. During the year, the mountain "La Puerta de Alcalà" was covered with books.

=== Alexandria 2002 ===
Library of Alexandria.

The Great Library of Alexandria in Alexandria, Egypt, was one of the largest and most significant libraries of the ancient world. The library, first constructed in the 3rd Century BC, is a resource of knowledge and the first world centre of arts and sciences. It was the first library to invent a bibliographic system. Although it was destroyed several times, the government of Egypt was determined to revive the library, an idea that dates back to 1974.

As part of the World Book Capital celebration, the Egyptian city reopened its library and presented the new library, the Bibliotheca Alexandrina on 16 October 2002. This US$220 million project took 7 years to be completed, was cited as the mark of "a significant modern endeavor," and was one of the main reasons Alexandria was selected as WBC, as it encouraged people to have an interest in reading.

Prior to the inauguration, the library coordinated with Alex Workshop Beautification Center, the Goethe Institute, and the French Cultural Center to organise the International Contemporary Art Encounter: Imaging the Book which took place from 19 to 22 September 2002.

=== New Delhi 2003 ===
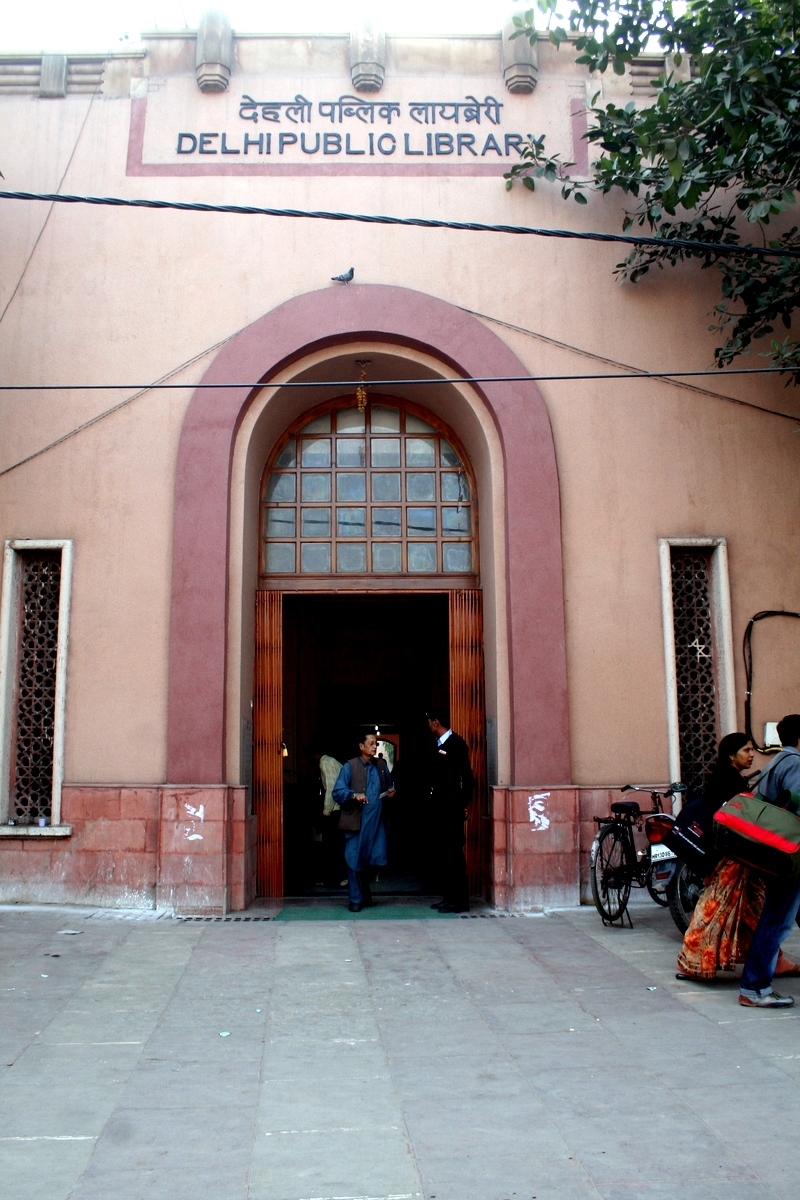
Delhi Public Library.

New Delhi, the capital of India, is home to the largest number of publishers in the country. Its selection made it the first city in the Asia-Pacific region to become a World Book Capital. It launched a programme to promote publishing in collaboration with all professional associations and political and social actors concerned with books, including government services.

Various activities were organised throughout the year, including the establishment of book kiosks, libraries, and a permanent book pavilion at Pragati Maidan. An emphasis was given to promoting literary habits among children. As part of the World Book Capital celebration, several initiatives were planned, with the National Book Trust (NBT) as the nodal agency:

- Opening book kiosks around the country
- Setting up a National Book Museum showcasing rare manuscripts/books on all branches of knowledge that serves as a reference library
- Publishing of rare manuscripts and awards to publishers and authors in different languages

Other events were the Delhi Book Fair in August 2003, the two-day National Convention on "Making India a Book Reading Society," and the Children's Book Exhibition at various prominent schools in New Delhi. The World Book Fair in February 2004 was specially focused on India’s contribution to the rich heritage of humankind in parallel with the theme "India’s Contribution to World Civilisation in the Field of Science and Technology."

=== Antwerp 2004 ===
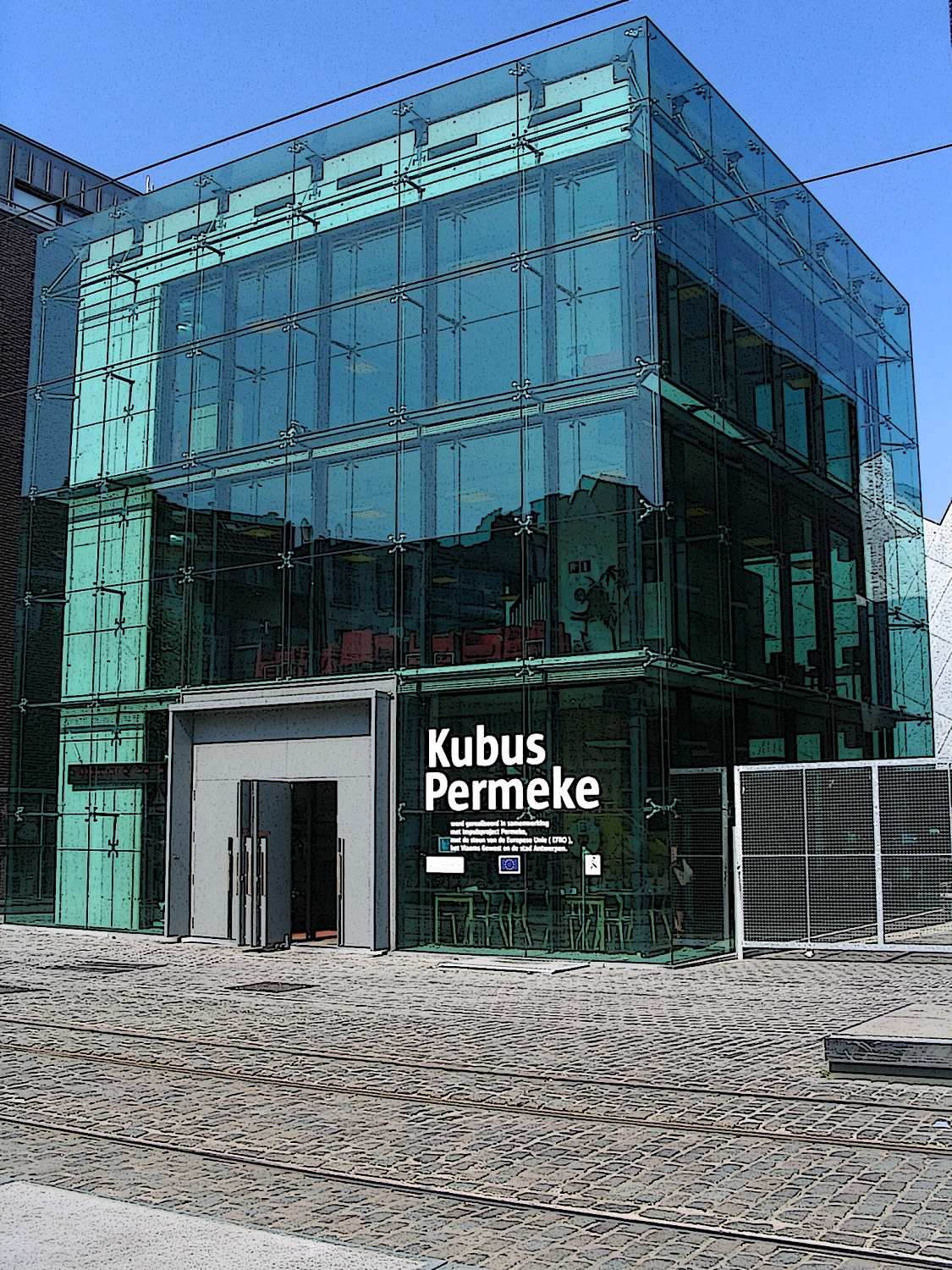
Permeke Library in Antwerp.

Theme: ABC 2004

The city of Antwerp in Belgium was selected as World Book Capital for 2004 for its broad-ranging program that covers promotion, sales, services, youth, book professions, cultural diversity, and urban cultural minorities. Antwerp has historically been a centre for free trade in books throughout Europe, and this may have been part of its appeal. The chosen theme "ABC 2004" evolved to "XYZ 2005" in the second part of its programme, where four exhibitions were devoted to the written heritage of the city.

With a budget of 1.7 million euros, several literary projects took place throughout the year, including word festivals, theatre street performances, public readings, celebrations of authors, letter-writing contests by mobile phone, publishing of books in collaboration with artists, exhibitions, as well as free distribution of blank notebooks to encourage writing. Poems were printed on the wrappers of bread and were made available to the public. In the main hall of DeSingel, Antwerp's international art and cultural centre, a metal cube was installed which housed a library.

Other activities include a sister project conducted by Studio for Co-operation under the City Poems initiative entitled STADSchromosomen (City Chromosomes). The project saw Antwerp getting paired with the city of Leeds where people from one city were able to read poems from the other city on a subject and vice versa.

=== Montreal 2005 ===
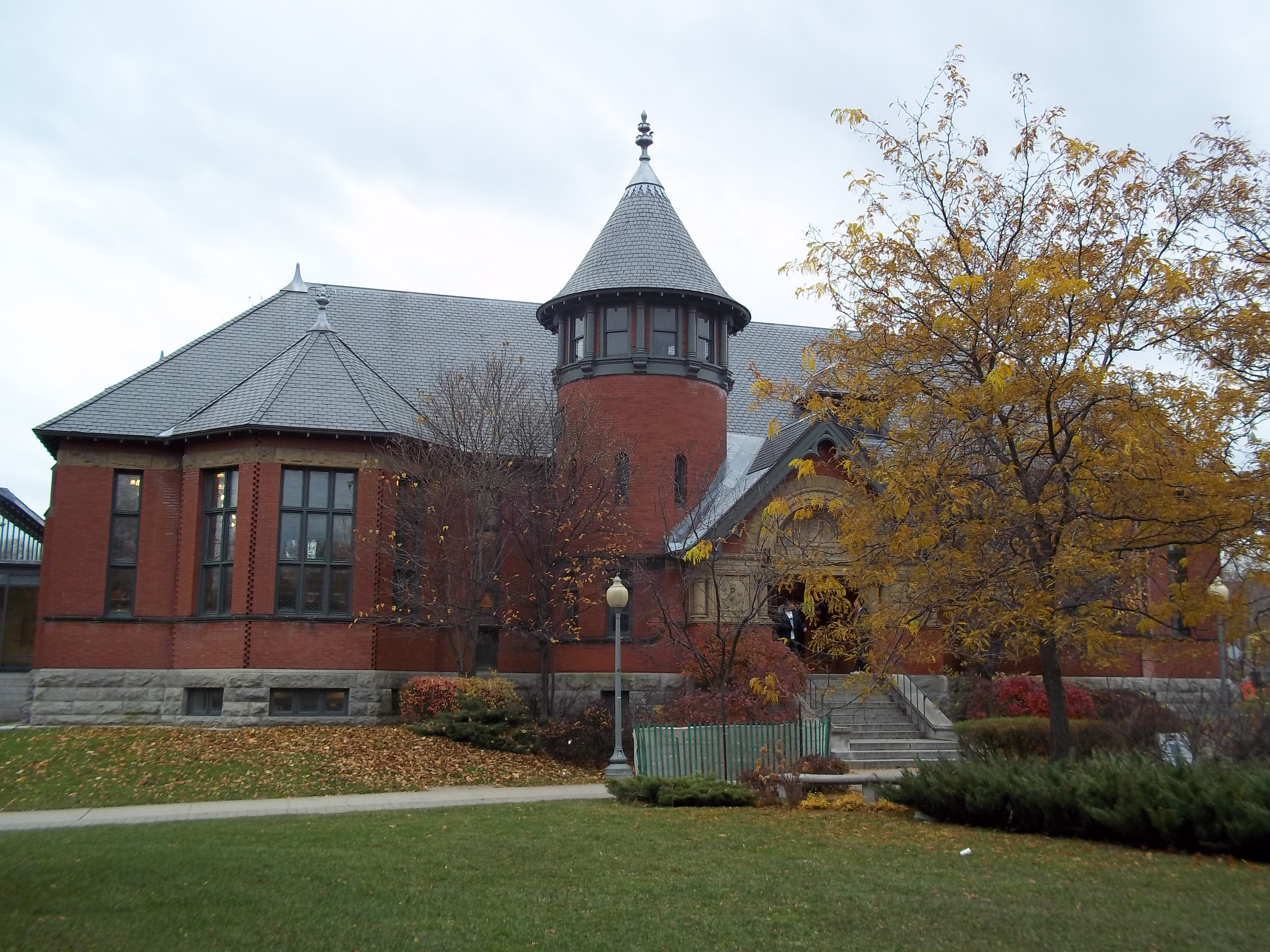
Westmount Public Library near Montreal.

Theme: The Gathering Power of Books

As the World Book Capital for 2005, the city of Montreal in Canada aimed to "underline the gathering power of books". The city was chosen for its internationally inclusive program that comprised a whole series of subject areas, with the cooperation and commitment of all the actors in the city's book chain. The main objectives of Montreal World Book Capital (MWBC) 2005 were to increase reading habits, especially among young people, encourage creative writing, stimulate the book industry, and strengthen its position as an international cultural city.

On 23 April 2005, the Canada Council for the Arts announced its plan to contribute $100,000 to help support activities organized for the event’s celebrations, which were developed under the themes of books and reading, creativity, education and learning, remembrance and heritage, culture, celebration, and festivals.

The main highlight was the inauguration of the Grande Bibliothèque on 30 April 2005. Authors including Marie Laberge, Réjean Ducharme, Yann Martel, Mordecai Richler, Michel Tremblay had their books highlighted during the year.

=== Turin 2006 ===
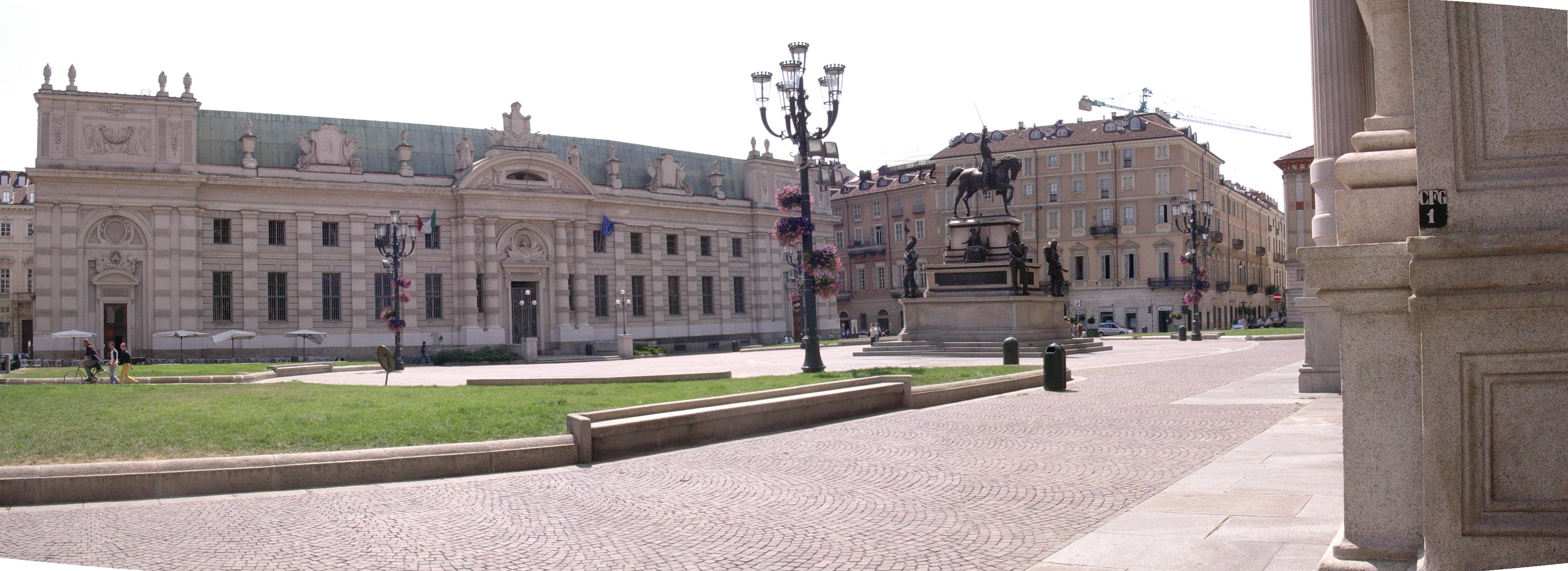
The National University Library in Turin.

Theme: Il Linguaggio dei Segni (The Language of Signs)

The city of Turin in Italy was designated World Book Capital, in collaboration with Rome, from 22 April 2006 to 22 April 2007. The municipality of Rome contributed to the programme all year long. The additional WBC theme was: Turin, World Book Capital with Rome: cities to leaf through. The city focused its programme on the meaning of the different punctuation signs and was run by Fondazione per il libro, la musica e la cultura of Turin.

Activities began in April 2006 with a poetic, literary, and musical evening, the "Bookstock". Throughout that day, various personalities and artists, including writers, poets, musicians, and people from the film industry, performed in the city centre with approximately 4,000 spectators attending the event. Many events occurred during the year and the majority of them were under TWBC 2006's theme, the language of signs, which include:

- "Il Punto Interrogativo" (The Question Mark)
- "La Virgola" (The Comma)
- "I Due Punti" (The Two Points)
- "Il Punto exclamativo" (The Exclamation Mark)
- "I Pontini de Sospensione" (The Suspension Points)
- "Il Parentesi" (The Brackets)
- "Il Punto" (The final Point)
- "Le Virgolette" (The Quotation Marks)
- "ll Punto e Virgola" (The semicolon)
- "Il @" (The @)

The programme was made up of more than 800 network projects, organised not only in Turin but throughout the region of Piedmont as well. Among these events were book readings, literary festivals and awards, school writing sessions, theatres, opera, etc.

Rome implemented cultural exchanges in the libraries of Baghdad, Buenos Aires, Bogotá, Guatemala, and Rwanda. The "Casa delle Letterature" (House of Literature), in collaboration with the Italian publisher "Gorée di Siena", has promoted the translation of a book produced by the children of Koh Phi Phi in Thailand, struck by a tsunami. This book was distributed throughout Italy for the reconstruction of the destroyed school.

=== Bogotá 2007 ===
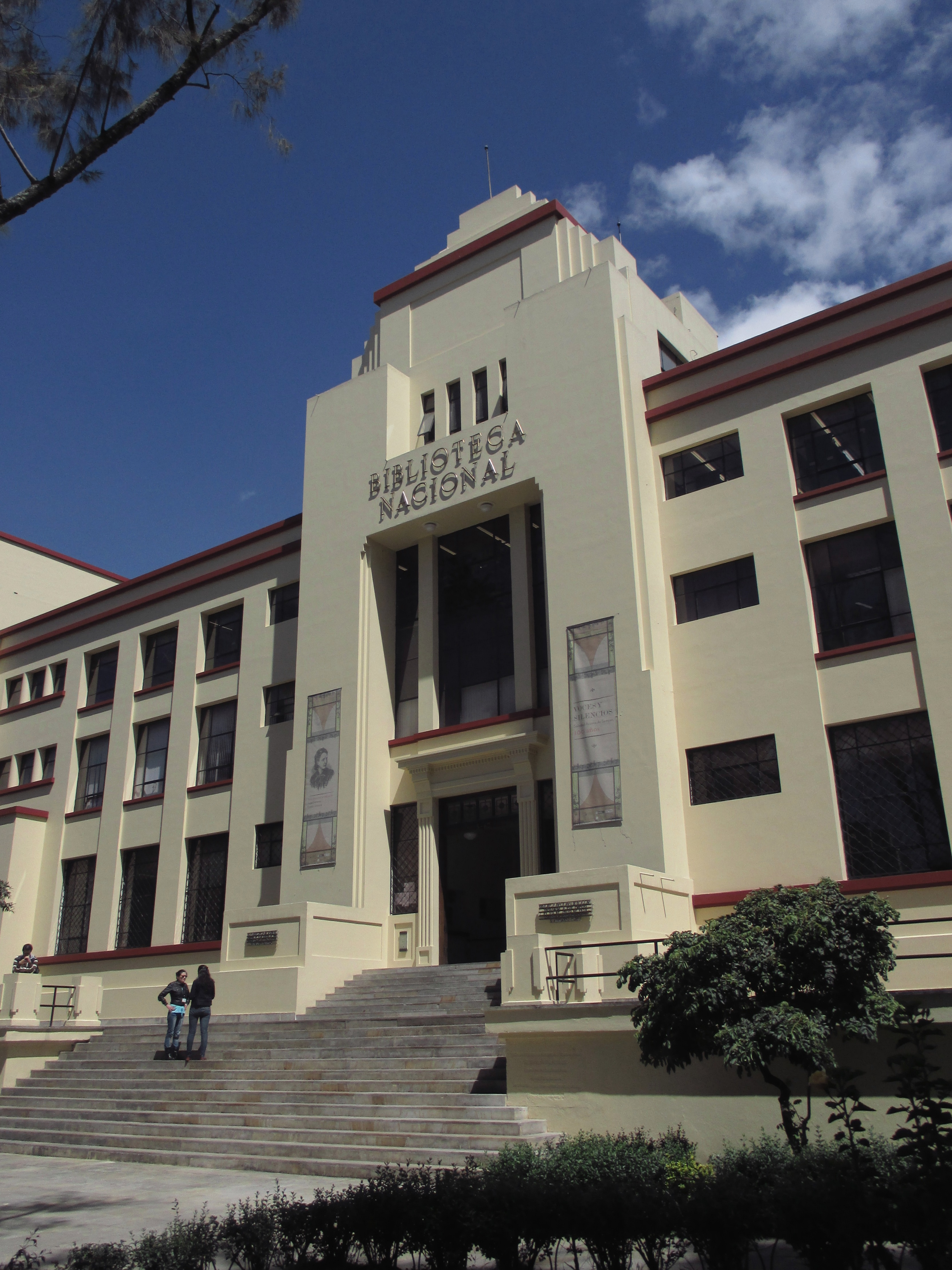
The National Library of Colombia in Bogotá.

Theme: We'll Get Bogota Reading

Bogotá, the capital of Colombia, was the first city in Latin America to win the title. The top priorities were the development of a culture of reading for social inclusion, promoting reading among children, young people, and adults of the city, especially among those who had limited access. The chosen slogan was: "We'll Get Bogota Reading."

During the World Book Capital celebration, the city hosts an International Book Fair, held in April every year since 1988. The fair is considered to be the largest in the reading culture and publishing industry in Latin America. Various other initiatives were implemented on several fronts:

- The creation of the Consejo Distrital de Fomento de la Lectura (District Council for the Promotion of Reading), responsible for setting reading and writing policies in the city
- The improvement of education with the development of a modern public library system
- The cooperation with a variety of organisations in the public and private sectors
- The launching of programmes to popularise literature, such as Libro al Viento ("Book in thé Wind")

=== Amsterdam 2008 ===
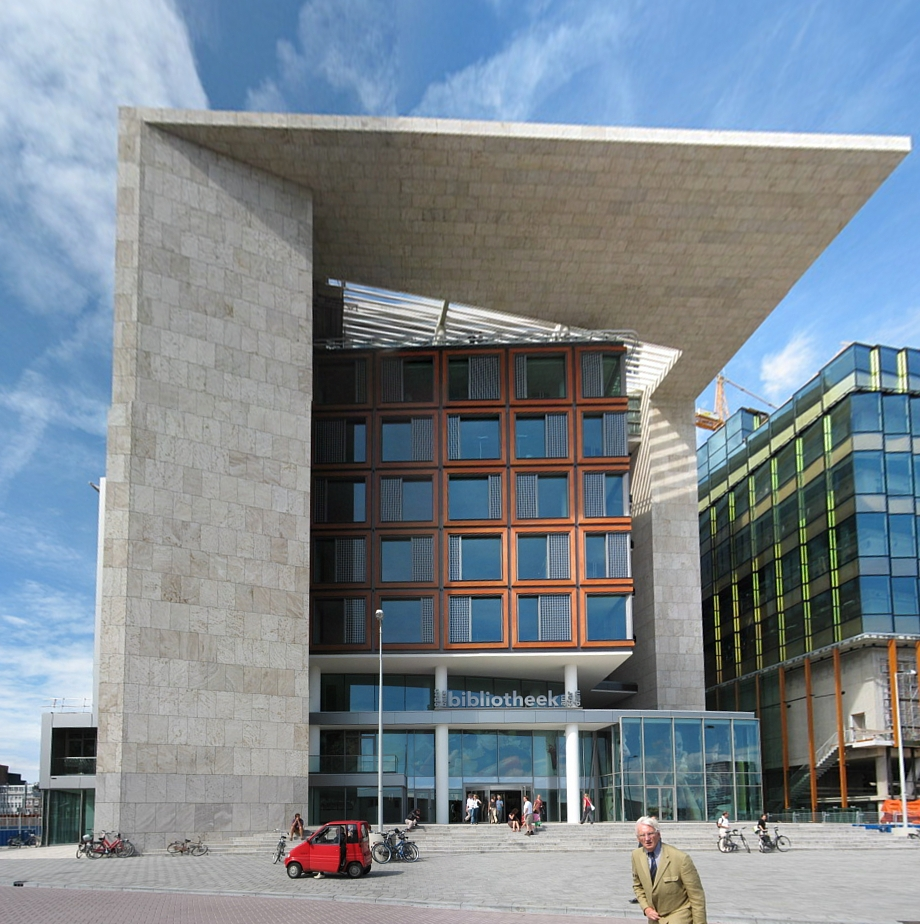
Amsterdam Public Library.

Theme: Open Book, Open Mind

Amsterdam, the capital of the Netherlands, was selected because of the quality and diversity of its book promotion programme, international character, and the involvement of local, national, and international participants, both public and private, in the book sector. The programme of Amsterdam World Book Capital, named 'Open Book, Open Mind', was centred around these three people: Spinoza, Anne Frank, and Annie M. G. Schmidt. In addition to the central theme, the programme carried out events towards the Municipal Council's three objectives:

1. Children First
2. We are all Amsterdam
3. Top City

The first Amsterdam "Book of the Night" was created on March 20. Libraries, bookshops, the weekly book fair, and hotel/catering venues around the Spui were filled with literary performances. Multiple authors and poets recited parts of their work for the people in the public square. Many events were targeted at the younger population and especially children. From October 2008 to April 2009, citizens were encouraged to engage their children in the Children's Book Capital programme.

Poetry also held a significant part in the programme. During the "Poetry in the Park" project, ten city districts hosted poetry activities open to all district residents. An interactive exposition of "poetry poles" was held in the Vondelpark. Also, the National Declamation Competition launched on National Poetry Day, the 29th of January, the final round of which was carried out as part of the AWBC closing week.

A total of 298 activities were realised during this period with the aid of public networks and other institutions, with 490,000 people taking part. The budget was estimated to reach above €2.7 million, with 60% from government organisations and 40% from funds, sponsors, and admission revenues.

=== Beirut 2009 ===
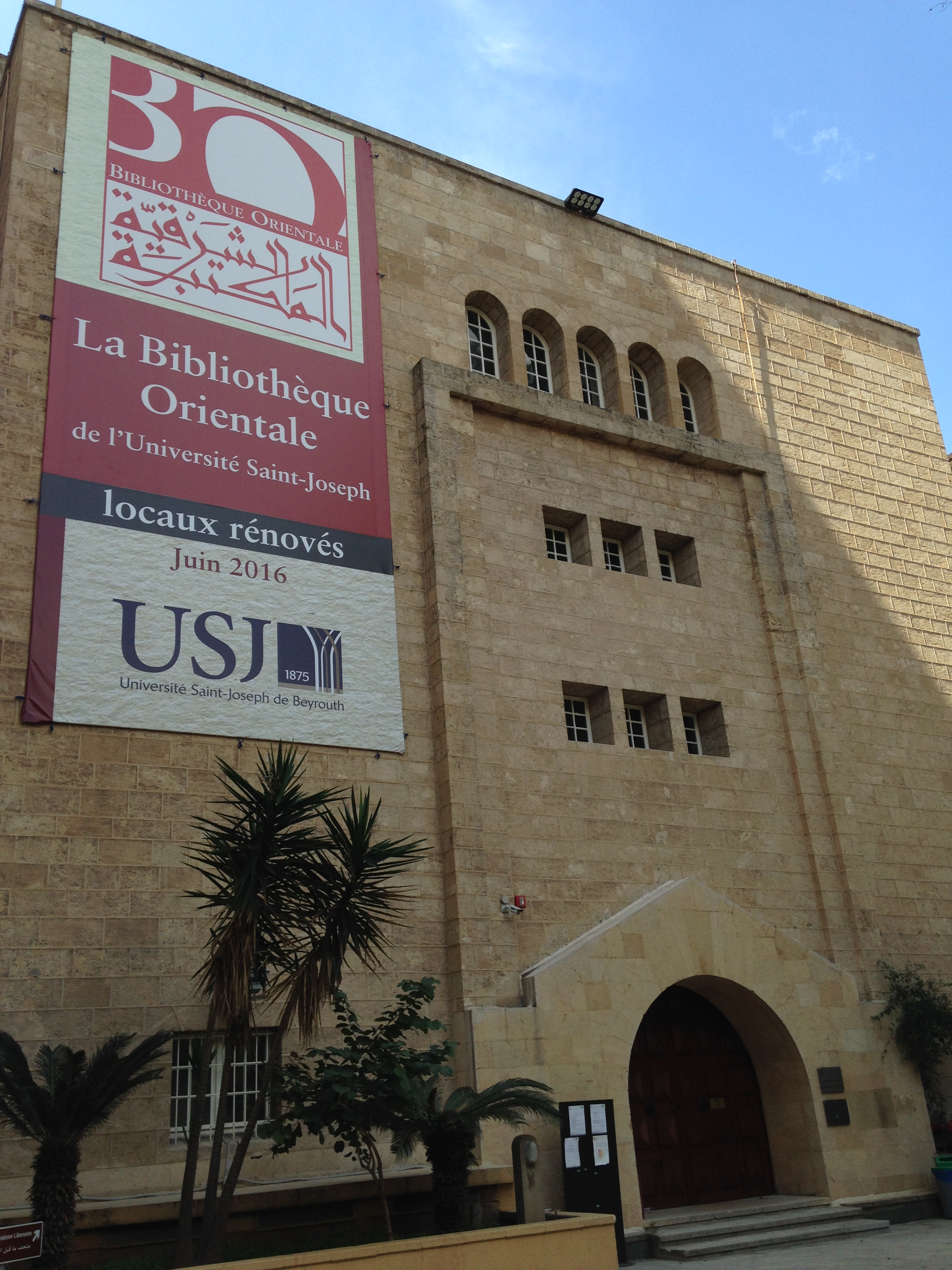
The Oriental Library founded by the Jesuits of the Saint Joseph University in Beirut.

Themes: "Books are our best friends. This year, Beirut is their capital." "Beirut reads. Beirut writes. Beirut publishes. The triple identity of Beirut."

The World Book Capital in 2009 was Beirut, the capital of Lebanon. The city was selected for its commitment to dialogue, which is necessary more than ever in the Middle East, despite facing great challenges in terms of peace and peaceful coexistence. A series of activities were planned, from literary cafés to specialised fairs, international symposiums and conferences, writing workshops, to all kinds of forums with a focus on Lebanese writers. The activities revolved around four themes:

1. Books, vectors of culture
2. Book trades
3. Promotion of reading and writing
4. Encourage youth to read

Exhibitions honouring the great Lebanese and Arab writers also took place during this period. Other events included thematics such as Lebanon and the Alphabet, festivals of poetry, comics, storytelling, a professional book fair, conferences dealing with copyright, the future of books, translation, meetings with Mediterranean booksellers, competitions, and prizes.

=== Ljubljana 2010 ===
The panoramic view of the National and University Library of Slovenia from Ljubljana Castle.

Theme: In The Realm of the Book

Ljubljana, the capital of Slovenia, was selected for the quality of its application, as well as for its diverse and complete programme, widely and enthusiastically supported by all players in the book industry including publishers, bookstores and libraries. The programme incorporated objectives related to the promotion of reading books, the increase in the accessibility of books to the entire population, the spread of the culture of reading, and the introduction of different literary genres to the public.

More than 300 activities were organised during the Ljubljana World Book Capital 2010, including:

- Ljubljana Reads: Growing up with Books was a project intended for three-year-olds, first-formers, and Slovenian secondary school students, who each received at the end a small gift in the form of a picture book or a Slovenian fiction book.
- Books and Creativity in Culture: events organised and held by museums, galleries, theatres, musicians, and other artists.
- Books and the City: literary events, traditionally held in Slovenia. Ljubljana installed new reading nooks in public spaces, intended for all the people of the city. A park maze was created where people got to read quietly, and book reading was facilitated in hospitals, in old people's homes, and in asylum detention centres.
- World Book Summit 2011 – Books as Promoters of Human Development: From 31 March to 1 April 2010, Ljubljana hosted this international summit. The main issues discussed were the challenges of digitization for the publishing industry, the aspects of translation from the world's minor to major languages, and international bestsellers. During the World Book Summit, the Ljubljana Resolution on Books was adopted. The resolution outlined the directions in which public administration could move to improve its support of books and reading.
- Pogledi: The bi-weekly newspaper, launched by Ljubljana's newspaper and publishing house Delo. Pogledi incorporated content in areas of culture, media, and intellectual life. It also constituted a platform for critical reflection on culture and society.
- Books for Everyone project: approximately 8,000 copies of 21 books were printed and were available for purchase at the symbolic price of €3.00 per copy.

=== Buenos Aires 2011 ===
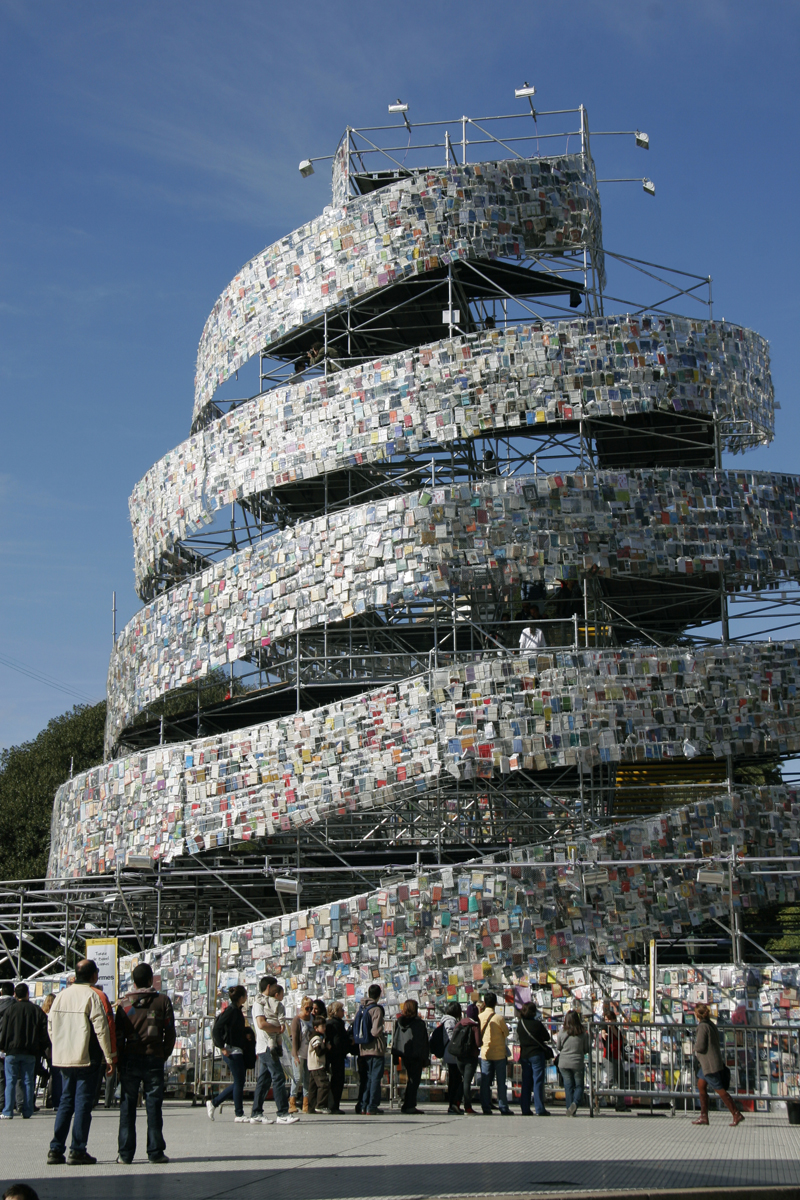
The Tower of Babel of Books, a work by Marta Minujín.

Theme: A City Open to the World of Books

The World Book Capital programme during the year 2011 was held in Buenos Aires, the capital of Argentina. The city was chosen for the quality and variety of its proposed programme as well as for the consolidated strategy on which it is based. The project unit "Unidad de Proyectos Buenos Aires Capital Mundial de Libro" was created especially for the occasion and was run by Luciana Blasco.

The three pillars of the Buenos Aires 2011 World Book Capital were:

1. The promotion of books
2. The promotion of reading
3. The promotion of literary heritage.

Traditional yearly events such as the Night of the Bookstores, International Poetry Festival, and Night of the Museums were enhanced for the occasion of World Book Capital. During that period, 85 events were organised, 80% of which were free of charge. In addition, the suburbs of Buenos Aires organised community libraries and book events for local people.

Historical authors, like Borges, Lorca, Sabato, were celebrated. New event entries were added to the International Bookfair and Filba, a Buenos Aires literature festival. Also, international books were showcased, with the main presence of French and Quebecois literature.

Unconventional spaces were utilised to attract new audiences. The Tower of Babel, designed by artist Marta Minujin, was a 25-metre tower made of 30,000 books in languages from all over the world. Approximately 115,000 books were distributed by buses as well as in subways, trams, and theatres. In addition, the tour of the city by bike included themes around poetry and reading Shakespeare. A website was also developed as a dissemination tool and served as a literary events diary for the year. The electronic newsletter managed to attract 20,000 subscribers.

The programme was funded by different streams: the Ministry of Culture, civil society, or private organisations, as well as the Metropolitan Fund for the Arts and the Patronage system.

=== Yerevan 2012 ===
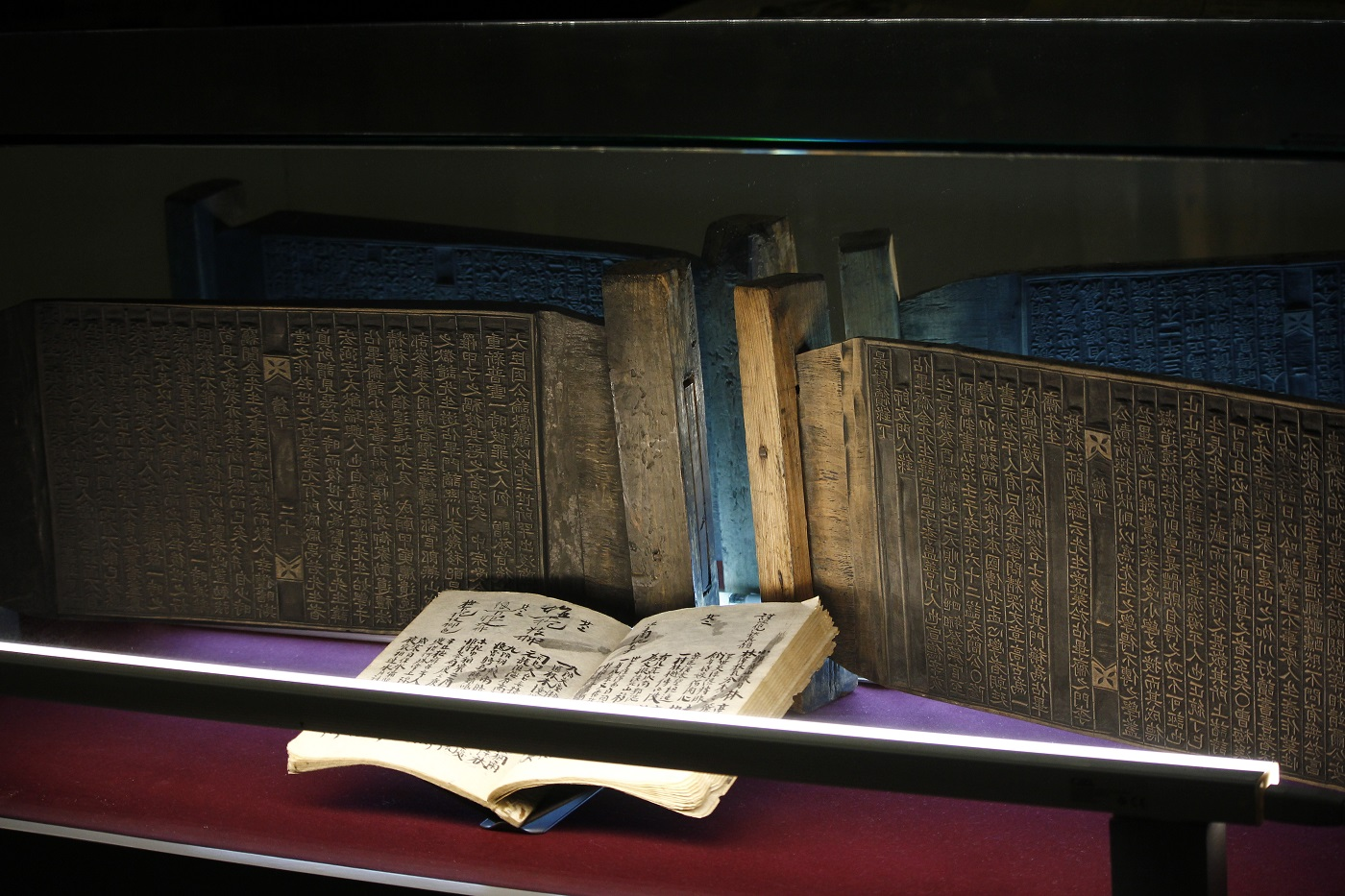
The Museum of Printing, Yerevan.

Theme: Eternity of the Word

The World Book Capital celebration in Yerevan, the capital of Armenia, concurred with the country's 500th anniversary of "Armenian printing" which was also celebrated in 2012.

The schedule of the Yerevan World Book Capital 2012 programme emphasised "the role of children and young adults in building knowledgeable societies". Some of the events aimed at this objective were:

- "Give us Books, Wings to Fly"
- "I Am Creating a Book"
- "Returning Books Back to Children"
- "Colorful Books"

Another priority of the Yerevan World Book Capital was to explore new technologies, ideas, and innovations.

Conferences, symposiums, and exhibitions were organised to discuss issues related to copyright, translation, freedom of speech, humanitarian and societal issues, genocide and internationally distinguished works of literature. Books about cinema, art, music and other art forms were also presented during exhibitions, seminars, and film premieres.

=== Bangkok 2013 ===
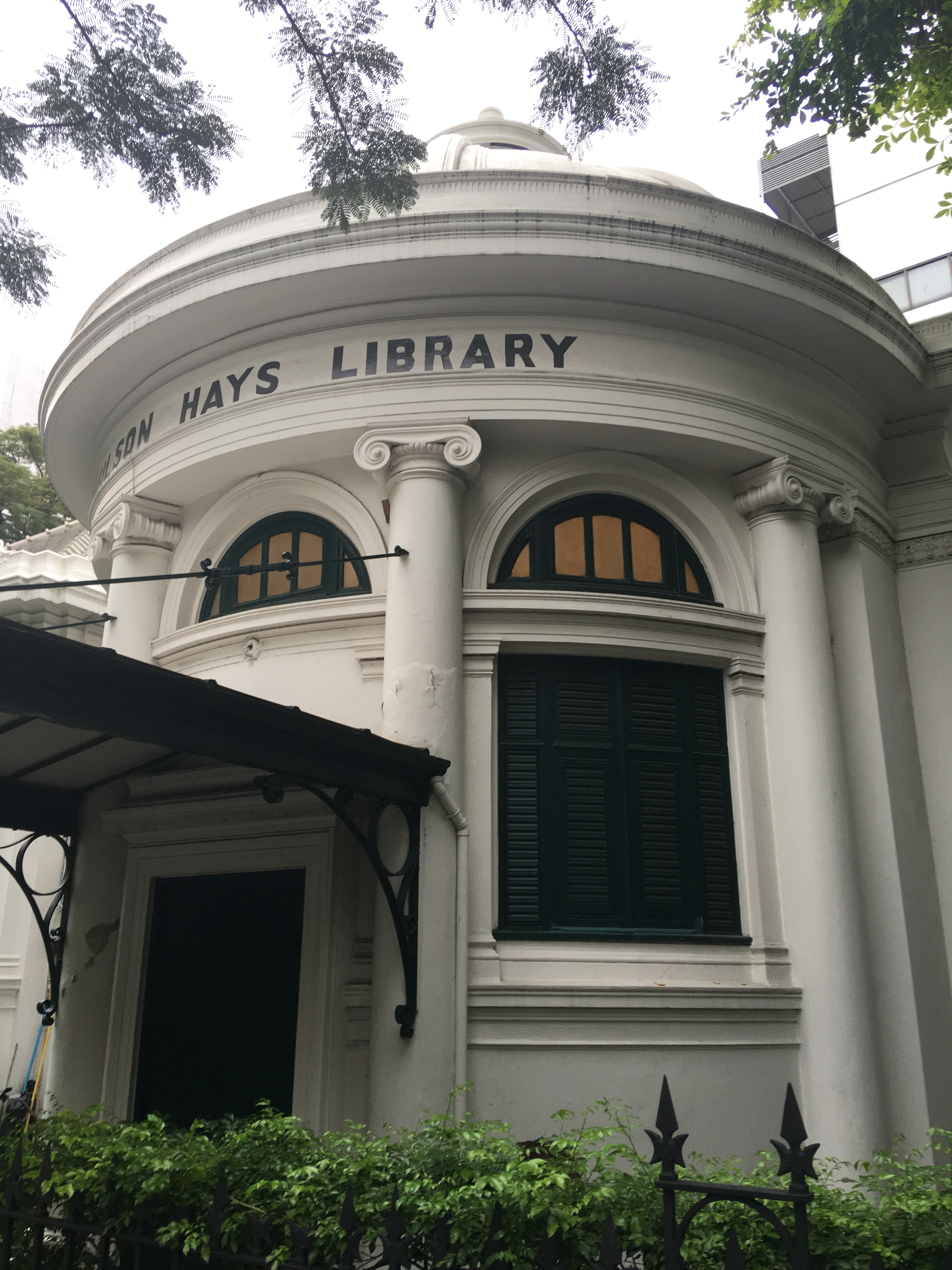
The Neilson Hays Library in Si Phraya District, Bangkok.

Theme: Read for Life

Bangkok, the capital of Thailand, was chosen for its willingness to bring together all the various stakeholders in the book supply chain and beyond, actors involved in the publication chain for a range of projects proposed, for its community-focused approach, and the high level of its commitment through the proposed activities. As the first city in Southeast Asia to win the title, the Bangkok World Book Capital 2013 programme focused on nine objectives:

1. Transform the old building of the Bangkok City Hall into a city library
2. Establish a Thai Cartoon Museum to inspire people to think outside the box
3. Cultivate a reading culture
4. Promote reading among children and youth
5. Encourage locals to research literature and broaden their minds
6. Promote learning and the usage of scientific books to encourage scientific thinking
7. Promote reading for instilling morality and good judgement, aiming towards a peaceful society
8. Work with the Bangkok Reading Group to create campaigns
9. The International Publishers Association (IPA) Congress, hosted by Bangkok in 2014 under the theme "Books Raise Morality, Enhance Creativity".

Numerous activities were organised all year long to reach these objectives. Bangkok collaborated with numerous organisations from the public and private sectors. Activities were run with departments in Bangkok, including those of education, healthcare, environment, social development, traffic control and 50 others.

All sectors were also tied together under another theme, "Thinking, Doing, Learning, Fixing, and Taking Responsibility Together." This encouraged collaboration from multiple stakeholders and associate networks, including TK Park, The Publishers and Booksellers Association of Thailand, SCG, The Mirror Foundation, Chula Book Center, Thai Health Promotion Foundation, and more.

=== Port Harcourt 2014 ===
Theme: Books: Windows to Our World of Possibilities

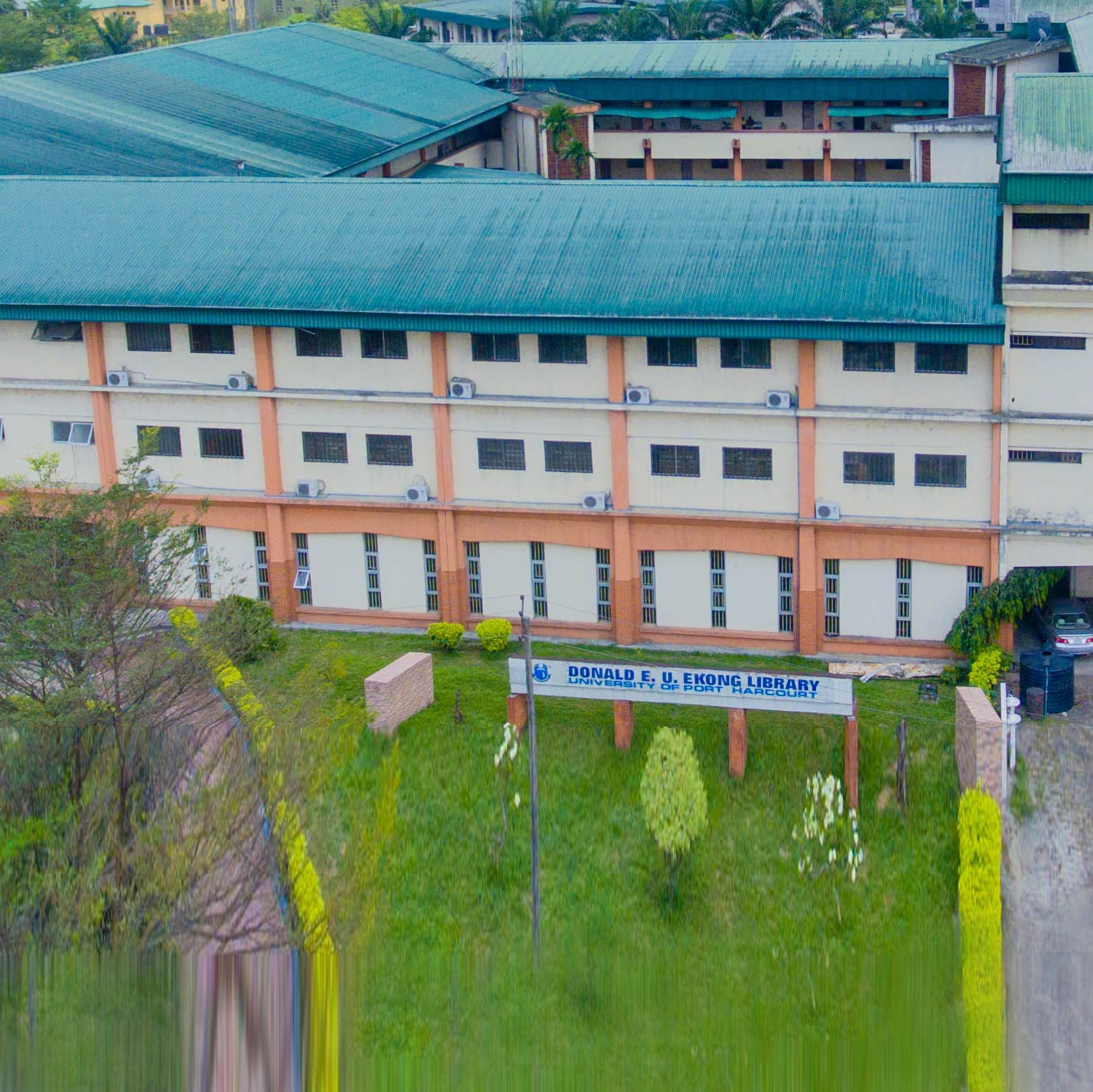
The Donald E. U. Ekong Library, the academic and research hub of the University of Port Harcourt.

Port Harcourt in Nigeria is the first city in Sub-Saharan Africa to win the title. The Rainbow Club organisation, a non-governmental organisation applied and won the bid on behalf of the Nigerian Government.

The theme of this year "Books: Windows to Our World of Possibilities", communicates the concept that reading books provides knowledge and exposure to new mentalities and ideas, as well as that it transports the reader to new worlds. Educating and cultivating citizens aimed at empowering them to protect democracy, promote social justice, and contribute to the development of their communities.

Besides the main theme, other main objectives of the Port Harcourt World Book Capital 2014, were promoting Nigerian and African literature, fostering a reading culture among children and youth, and improving literacy rates. Book fairs and reading events took place throughout the year.

The World Book Capital programme 2014 granted people access to more libraries and more literary activities in the city. The programme encouraged young people to use facts from their lives to tell their own stories, through the usage of technology and social media. This was achieved in several events: The Book Clubs, Reading Tree, Book-of-the-Month, exhibitions, amongst others. Other activities were: "Library Support Programme", a voluntary training by other adults and donations to modern school libraries which were recently created, "Books on the Radio", "Television Show: Game Show-" Know your World", " Monthly Drama performances", "The walking Book", "Ken Saro-Wiwa ‘Writer-Martyr Memorial Square’", "Introduction of a writers’ residency program", "Possibilities for Nigeria-Essay Contest as Nigeria turns 100", "Integration into existing state events", etc.

=== Incheon 2015 ===
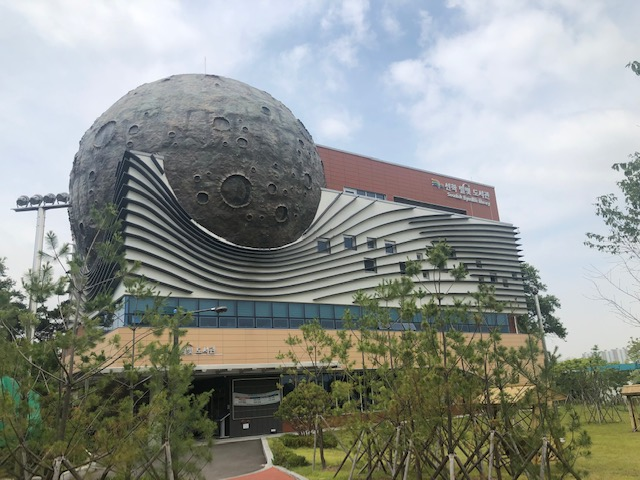
Panoramic view of Seonhak Byeolbit Library, Incheon.

Themes: "Books for All" "Read and Discover Yourself"

The city of Incheon in South Korea was selected on account of the quality of its programme and the impact it will have on improving good integration of all stakeholders in the promotion of books and reading, access to books and writing in all formats for its citizens and the people of the Korean Peninsula. During the designated year, the public and private sectors in the city organised projects under the slogans "Books for All" and "Read and Discover Yourself".

A total of 45 projects were organised in 6 different domains:

1. Reading Culture in Daily Life
2. Invigorating the Publishing Industry
3. Renaissance of Humanities in Incheon
4. A City that Communicates Through Books
5. Commemorative Projects
6. Special Events

Large-scale events, such as the Korea Reading Festival and the Korean Library Association's General Conference, were organised and met with extensive participation.

The Incheon EduContent Fair introduced a place where education met with digital technology. It constituted a platform for global information sharing on the latest trends in related industries. This fair also presented the future of education with state-of-the-art technologies such as Smart Class and Hologram Class. Local libraries provided reading resources for different social groups, age groups, the less privileged. Events were held aimed to reignite interest in the humanities. People and companies supported the local libraries through book donations and voluntary work.

According to the National Survey of Reading Habits, conducted by the Ministry of Culture, Sports and Tourism the number of books read by Incheon citizens in 2015 increased by around 47%.

=== Wrocław 2016 ===
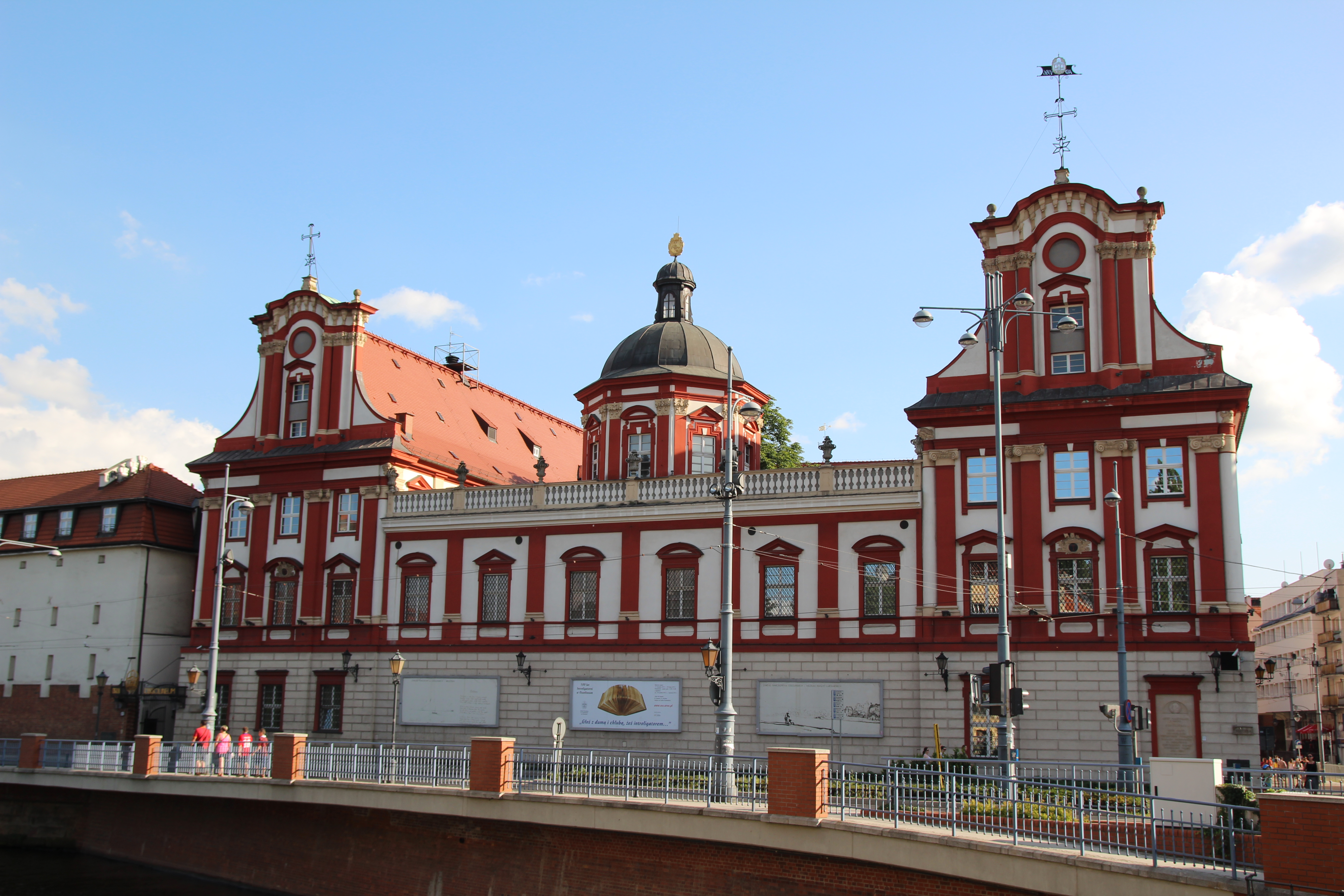
Ossoliński National Institute in Wrocław.

Theme: Read to Me, Wrocław

The Polish city of Wrocław is the first city to be awarded both the World Book Capital and European Capital of Culture titles in the same year. With the slogan "Read to Me, Wrocław", Wrocław planned various cultural activities for participants of all ages.

During the World Book and Copyright Day, on April 23, the event "European Literature Night" took place, which launched a special edition due to World Book Capital celebrations with a focus on William Shakespeare. Excerpts from his works were read and interpreted in places all around the city by renown Polish actors, like: Ewa Skibińska, Magdalena Cielecka, Jan Nowicki, Arkadiusz Jakubik and Bartosz Porczyk.

The Polish city of Wrocław also launched a composition competition in order to create a "world book anthem". This book hymn featured the words from the work of Tadeusz Rozewicz, the "Petit cheveu du poète". Tadeusz Rozewicz, the polish poet and playwright, died in Wrocław in 2014. His work was translated into hundreds of languages.

=== Conakry 2017 ===
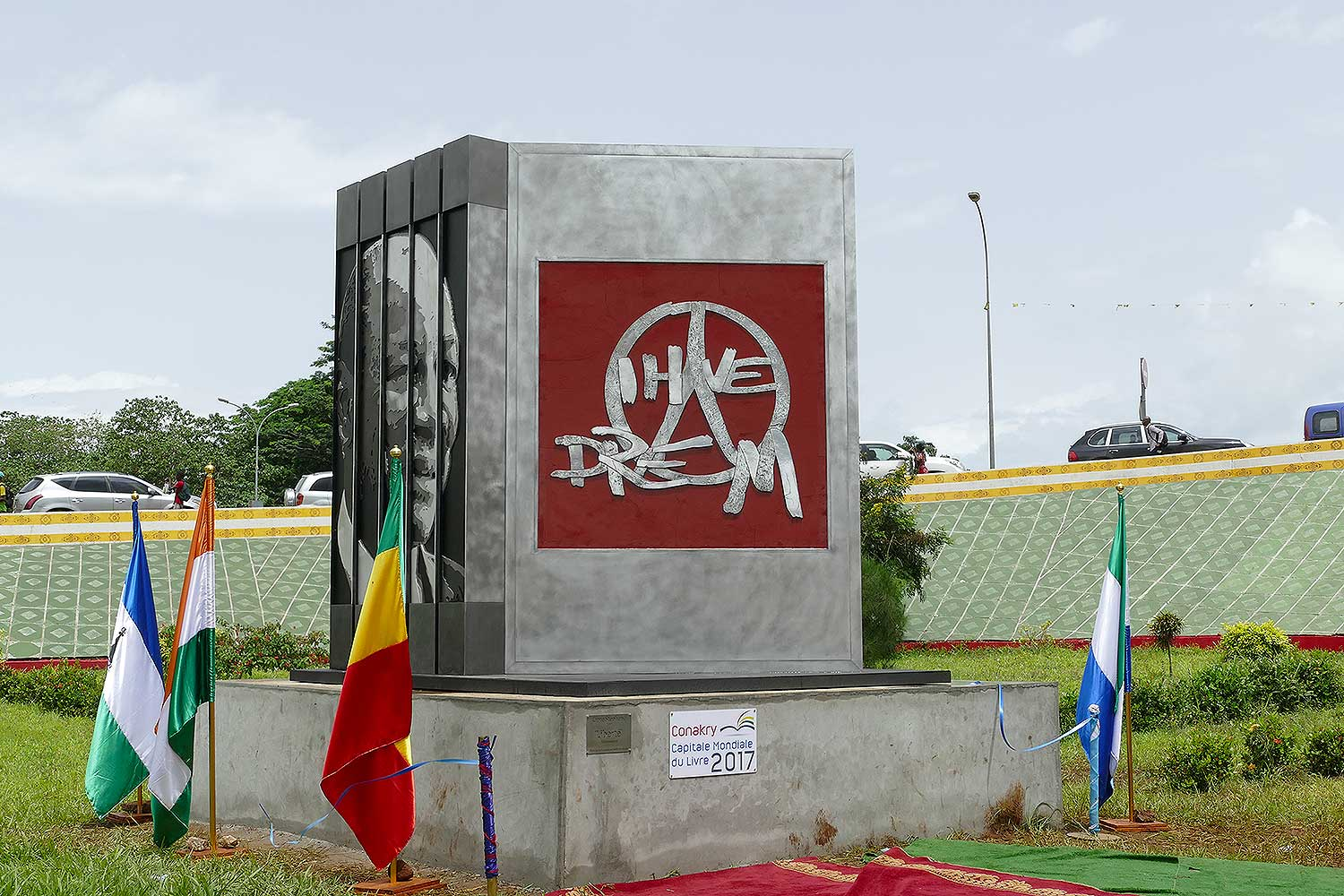
Sculpture for the Conakry World Book Capital.

Theme: Make Dreams Come True

Conakry, the capital of Guinea, is the first city in francophone Africa to be nominated for the World Book Capital title. Until 2017, only three African cities were appointed with the title: Alexandria in 2002, Port Harcourt in 2014 and Conakry in 2017.

At the time of Conakry's nomination, 60% of the Guinean population could not read. The project intended to fight illiteracy in Guinea by helping young people and people from rural areas get access to books.

Higher literacy and stronger reading culture in schools, libraries, institutions, and among the general public were all primary priorities of the programme. Monthly cultural events focused on the country's authors and culture. In addition, a media library was built in each commune of Conakry, and reading areas were established in every neighbourhood. Guinea's book industry benefited from the improved infrastructure and access to books, thanks to the new constructions for the World Book Capital programme.

=== Athens 2018 ===
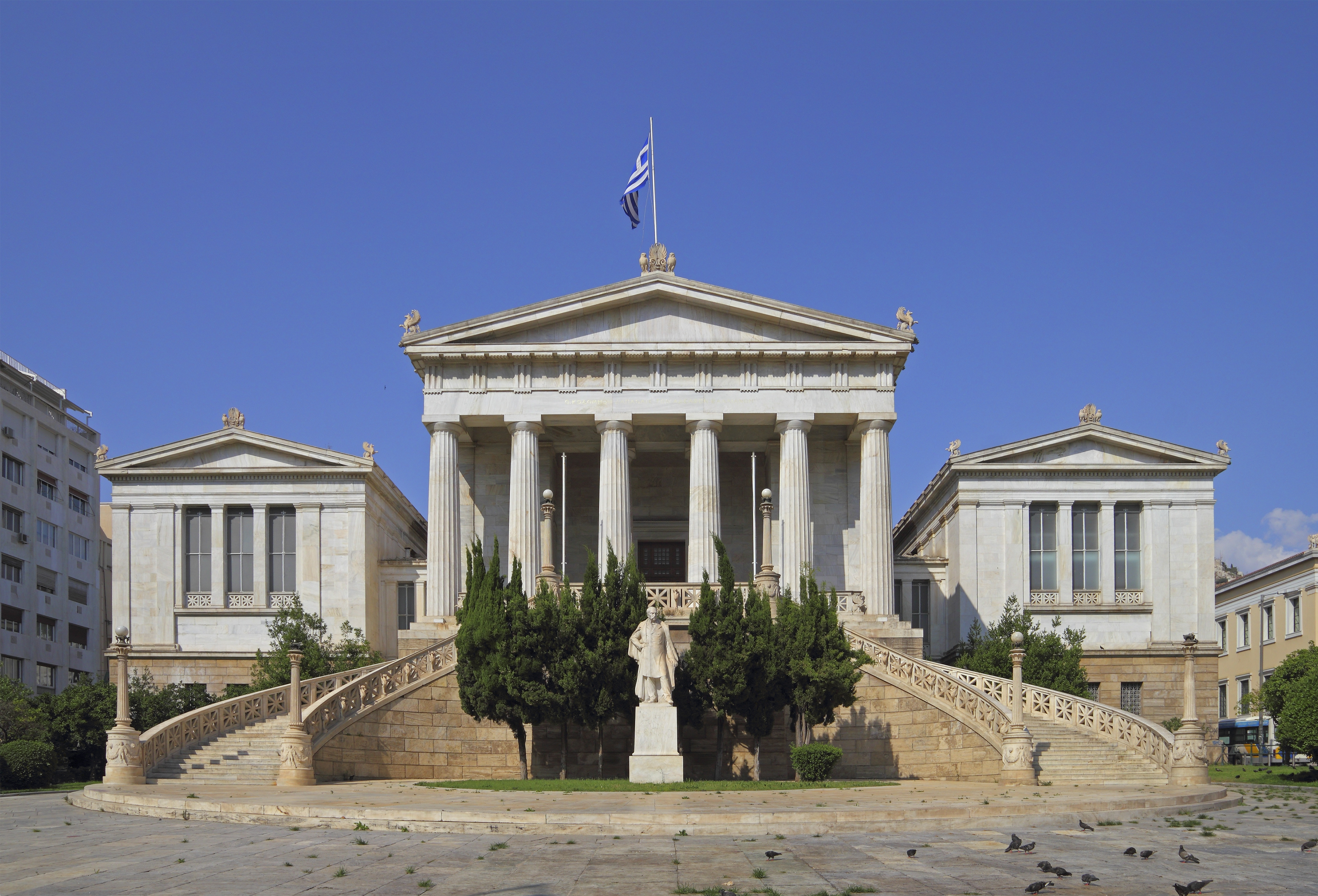
The Vallianeion Megaron building, which housed the National Library of Greece prior to 2017.

Theme: Books Everywhere

The World Book Capital in 2018 was Athens, the capital of Greece. The city was chosen based on the "outstanding quality" of its programme of activities for the book trade in the country. This year's slogan was "Books Everywhere".

The programme was based on 8 thematic areas:

1. Celebrating Reading - Discovering Reading Treasures
2. A World of Writers
3. Greek Writers
4. Athenian Book Itineraries
5. Open Collections and Archives
6. Educational Activities
7. Book and the Arts
8. Contemporary Narratives

Each of these eight objectives was aligned with the main goal of the project to make books and culture accessible to everyone, residents or visitors, across all neighbourhoods of Athens. A total of 615 events and activities were realised during the designated year under the themes of; Celebrating Reading (234 events), A world of writers (international writers) (41 events), Greek writers (19 events), Athenian Book Itineraries (48 events), Open Collections and archives (43 events), Educational Activities (81 events), The Book and the Arts (114 events), and Contemporary Narratives (35 events). The programme cooperated with 212 cultural institutions, such as museums, embassies, foreign institutes, international organisations and non-governmental organisations.

Inclusive and free of admission events were organised in public and private spaces across the seven municipal districts. Some of the programme initiatives were: moving and pop-up libraries, Bibliobuses- books on wheels, cultural performances and talks by esteemed authors from around the world, poetry readings, installations, festivals, exhibitions and many more. The programme reached about 450.000 residents and visitors of all backgrounds.

=== Sharjah 2019 ===
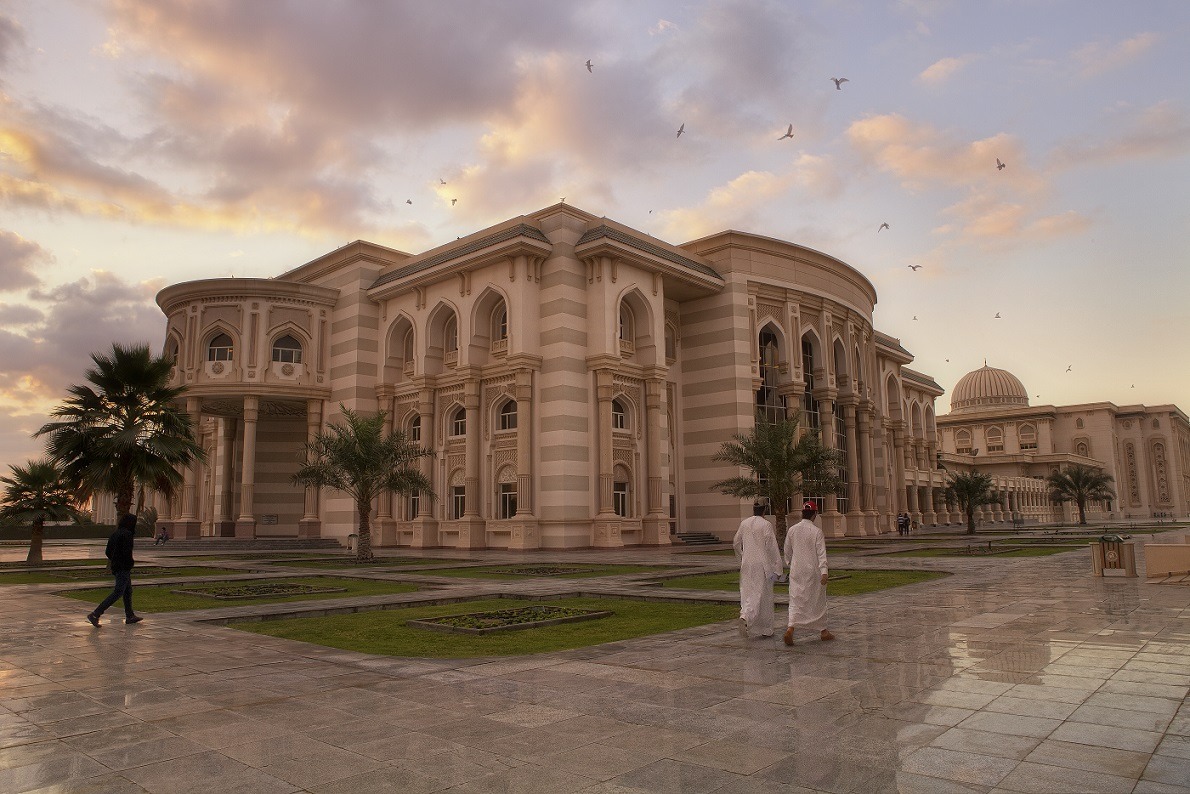
The main library inside the American University of Sharjah campus.

Theme: Open Books, Open Minds

The World Book Capital programme in 2019 was held in Sharjah, the third-most populous city in the United Arab Emirates.

The activities were developed under six pillars:

1. Raise more awareness about books and reading
2. Foster an environment of knowledge
3. Unify communities
4. Honouring heritage
5. Empower children and youth
6. Develop publishing industries

The government, along with non-government entities, formed multiple activities such as poetry readings, singing, and storytelling events in industrial workers' accommodations. More than fifty libraries with books in Urdu, English, and Tagalog were gifted to industrial workers.

Book Fairs and campaigns were also part of the programme. The International Book Fair is an 11-day event held annually in Sharjah. During the fair "Give Your Book a New Life", more than ten thousand books were available at symbolic prices to make reading affordable to people from every socioeconomic background. Also, a Book Donation Campaign was carried out, the "Kan Ya Ma Kan", which translates to Once Upon Time.

Another popular campaign that combined reading and outdoor activities was the Sharjah Beach Library campaign. Beach libraries were installed in Sharjah, filled with books for all ages, in various languages.

During the year, many public offerings were commissioned, such as the House of Wisdom. This new library and cultural centre combined traditional and digital resources of knowledge, information, interactive learning, and contemporary pedagogy. The House of Wisdom provides free and open access to people of all ages and nationalities. It spans more than 12,000 square metres and includes two floors of libraries with more than 105,000 books, discussion halls, indoor and outdoor reading areas, and an educational space for children.

The Sharjah World Book Capital contributed to initiatives and conversations at international book fairs in London, Turin, Moscow, and at the LIBER International Book Fair in Madrid in 2019.

=== Kuala Lumpur 2020 ===
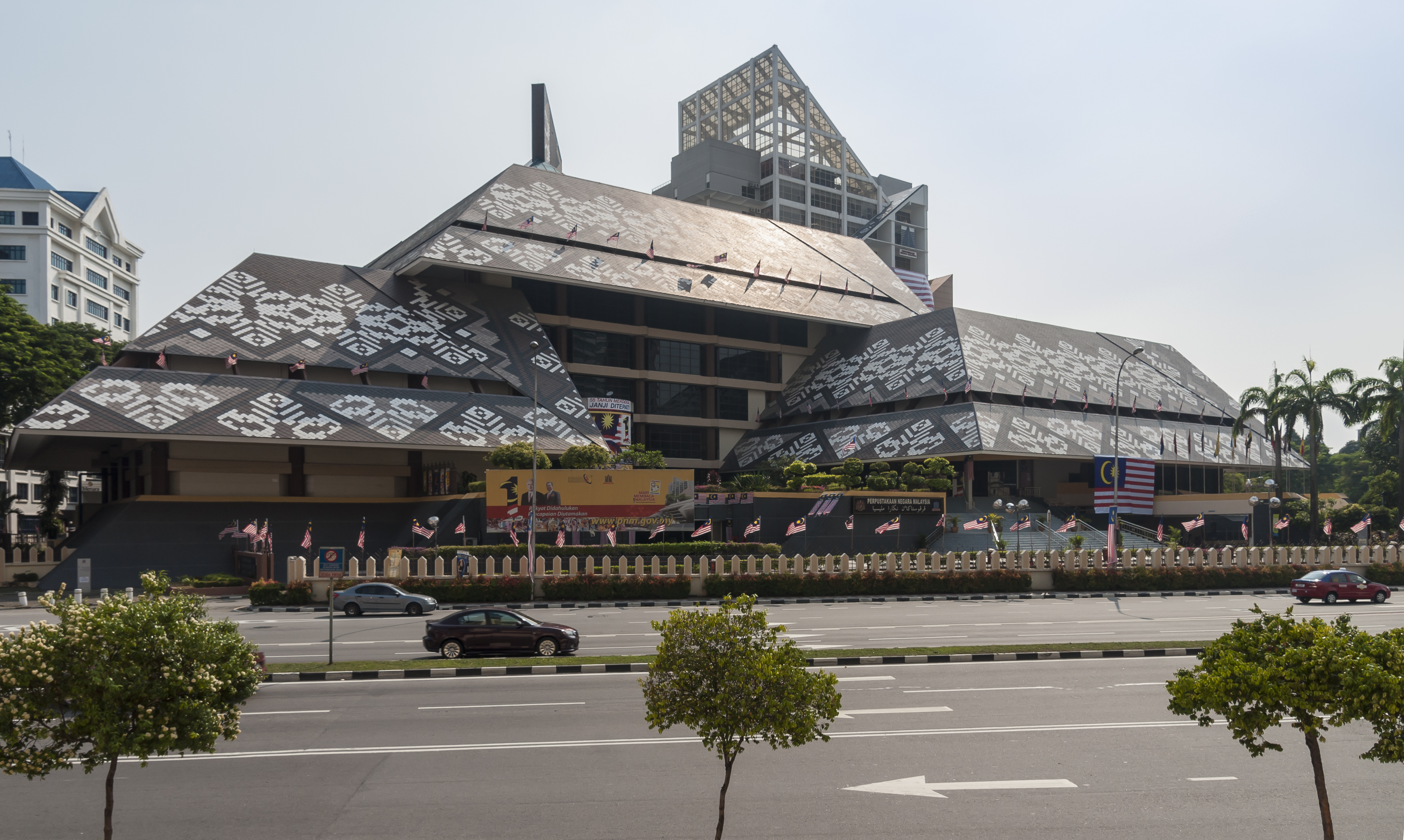
The National Library of Malaysia in Kuala Lumpur.

Theme: KL BACA: Caring Through Reading

The designation of the World Book Capital for 2020 was given to Kuala Lumpur, the capital of Malaysia. The city was chosen for its strong focus on inclusive education, the development of a knowledge-based society, and accessible reading for all parts of its population. Under the theme "KL BACA (Malay pronunciation: [bɑːtʃɑ]): Caring Through Reading," the organising committee stated that "a city that reads is a city that cares". The program focused on four subthemes:

1. Reading in all its forms
2. Development of the book industry infrastructure
3. Inclusiveness and digital accessibility
4. Empowerment of children through reading

The activities were organised around five streams:

1. The multiplicity of reading, literature, and cultural activities
2. Development of book infrastructure and supporting activities
3. Enhancement of Kuala Lumpur International Book Fair
4. Empowerment of children's reading culture and literature
5. Accessibility of e-books and digital reading

The Kuala Lumpur World Book Capital 2020 initiatives, in addition to the main theme, focused on Diversity and Environmental Rejuvenation. These two pillars were considered essential to developing a sustainability strategy.

More than 50 on-site events were scheduled to take place throughout the city. However, most of them had to be cancelled or carried out virtually due to the COVID-19 pandemic. The official handover ceremony was conducted via video presentation on 23 April 2020.

=== Tbilisi 2021 ===
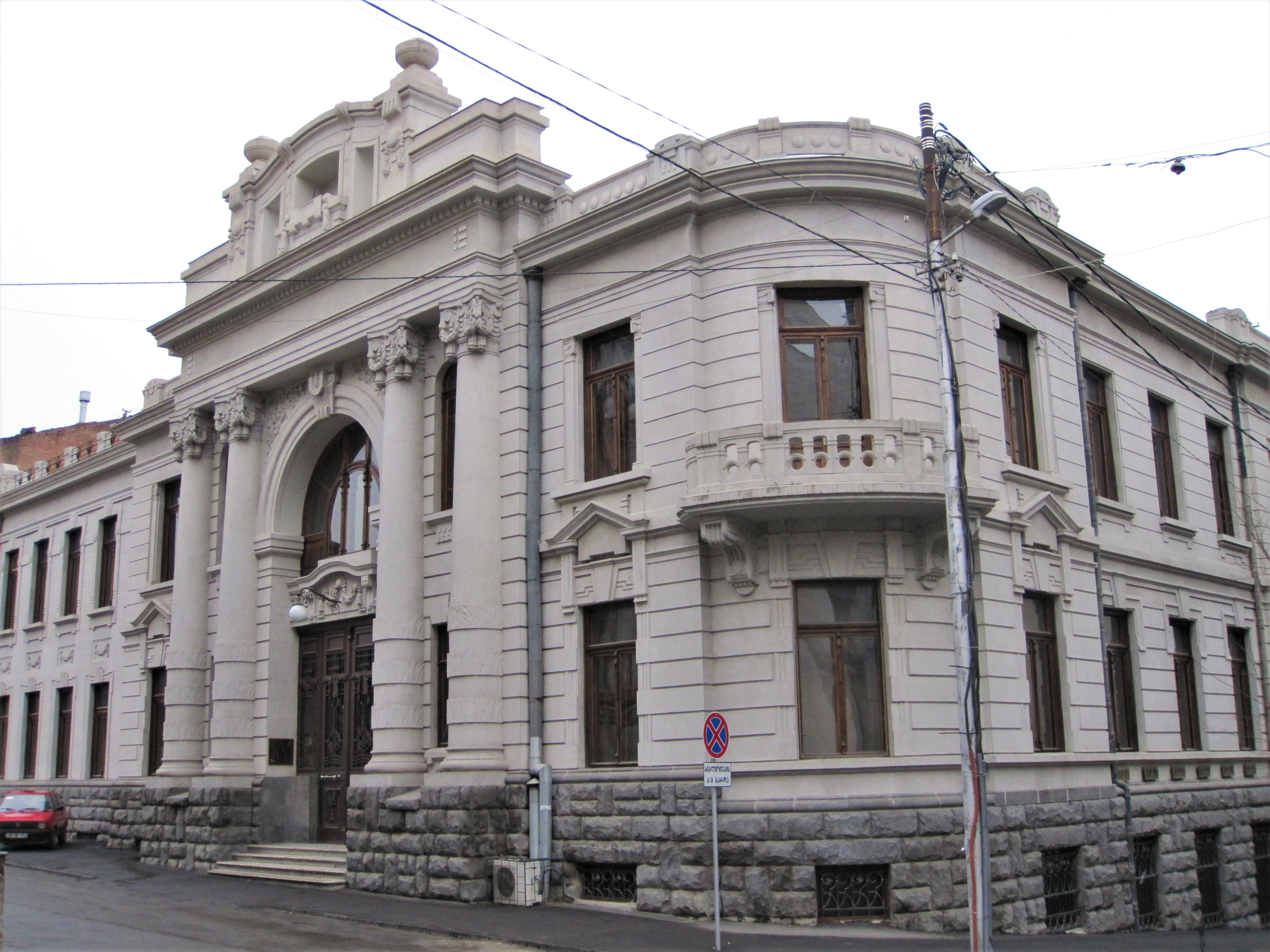
The National Library of Georgia in Tbilisi.

Theme: OK. So your next book is…?

The World Book Capital programme in Tbilisi, the capital of Georgia, primarily focused on new media and technologies as tools to facilitate reading and promote books to young people. The main goal was to make reading more popular and accessible across all neighbourhoods and age groups.

Up to 100 events and projects were scheduled, including book festivals and digital and sustainable book-related activities. Some of the main highlights included the Children’s Book Fair and the establishment of the Children’s Literary Award “Nakaduli” which was named after one of the first Georgian children's magazines.

=== Guadalajara 2022 ===
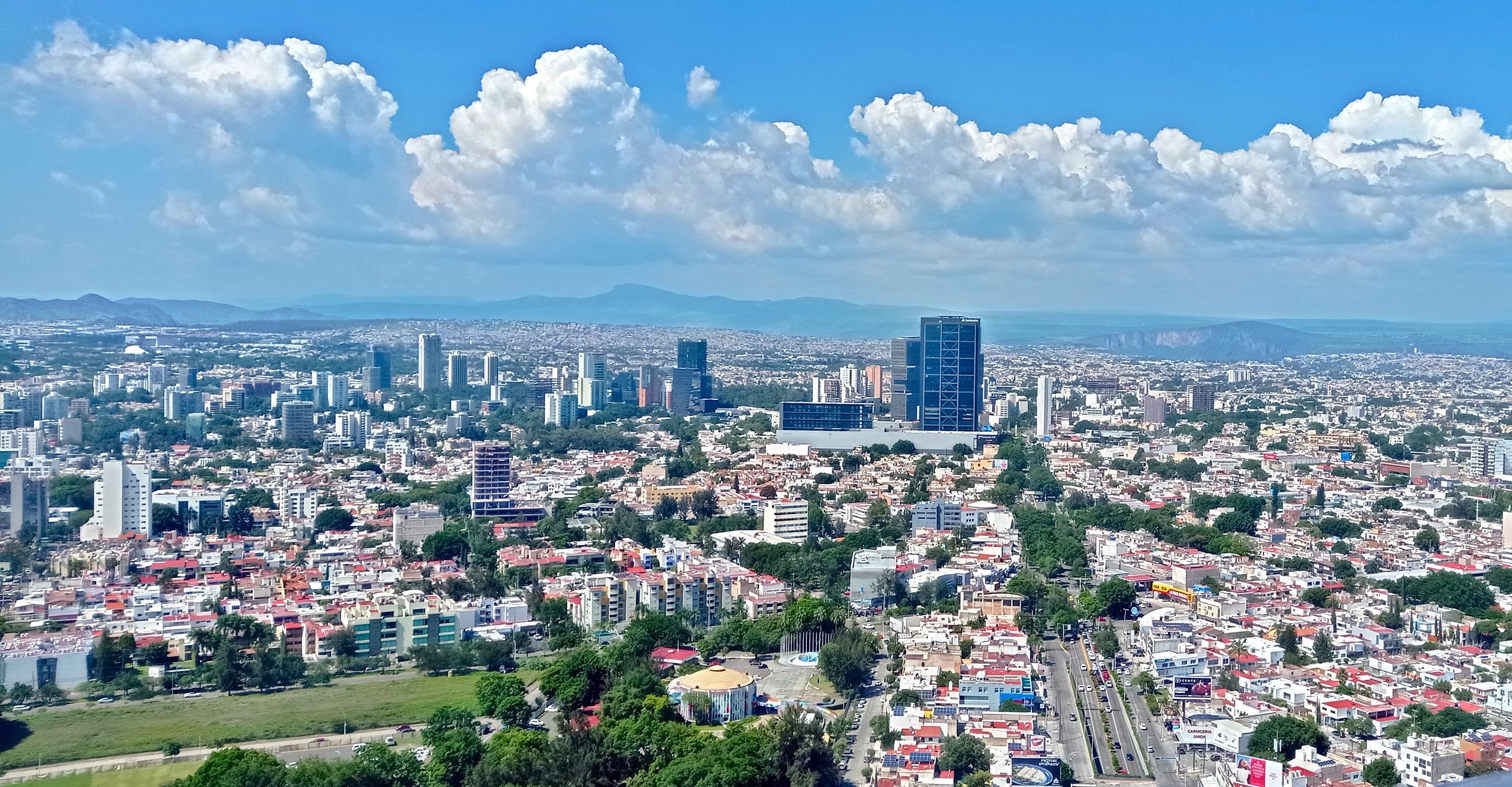
Panoramic view of Guadalajara in Mexico.

Theme: How Books Contribute to Peace

The city of Guadalajara in Mexico was chosen for its comprehensive plan for policies around the book to trigger social change, combat violence, and build a culture of peace. The World Book Capital programme in the city primarily focused on three strategic axes:

1. Regaining public spaces through reading activities in parks and other accessible places
2. Social bonding and cohesion, especially through reading and writing workshops for children
3. Strengthening of neighbourhood identity using intergenerational connections, storytelling, and street poetry

The main highlight included Guadalajara International Book Fair, considered by many as the most prominent cultural annual event of its kind in the Spanish-speaking world.

=== Accra 2023 ===
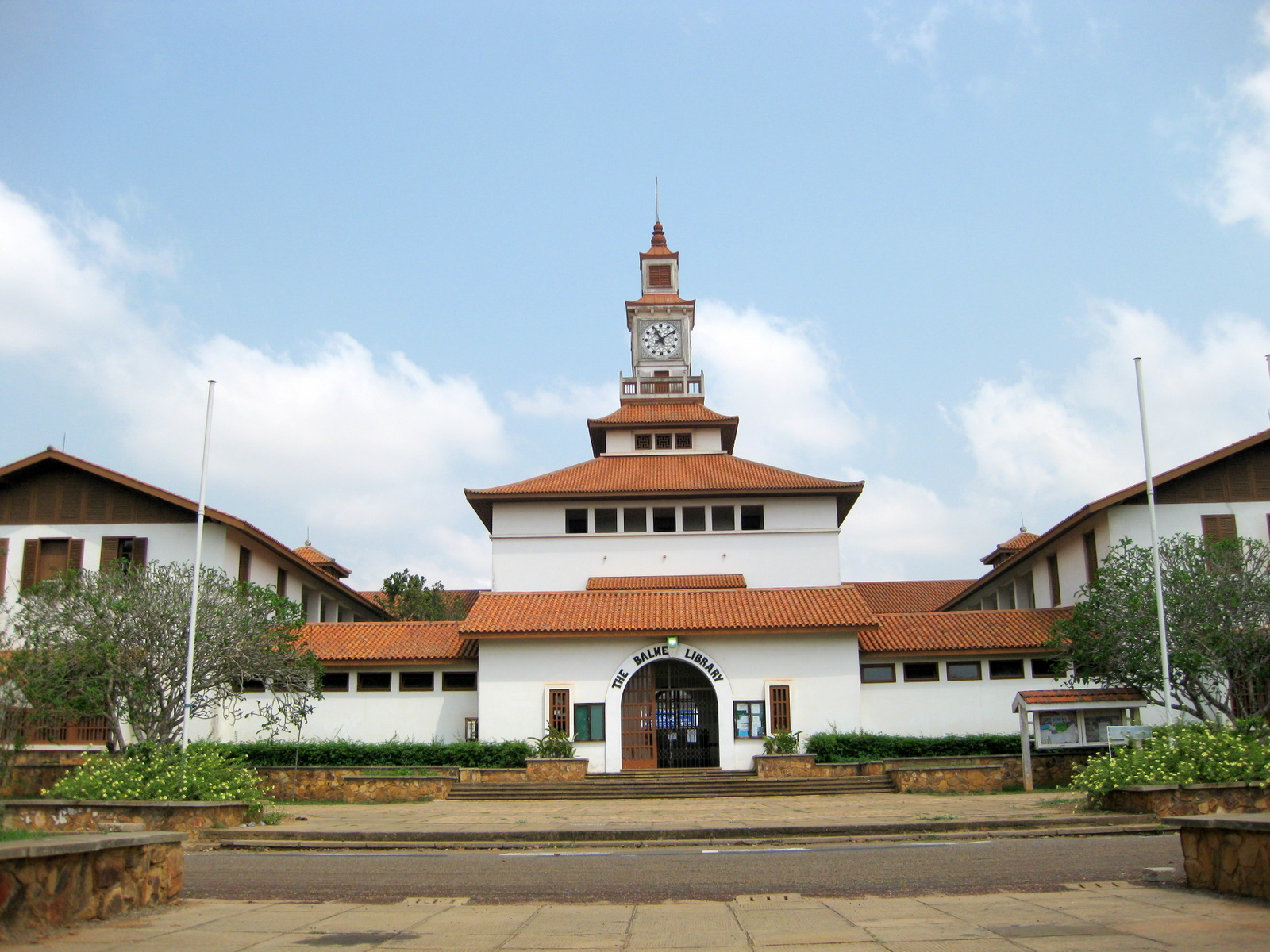
The Balme Library inside the main campus of the University of Ghana.

Theme: Reading to Connect Minds for Social Transformation

Accra, the capital of Ghana, was selected for its strong focus on young people and their potential to contribute to the culture and wealth of the country. For the World Book Capital celebration in the city, six major projects were planned in collaboration with Accra Metropolitan Assembly alongside public and private stakeholders:

1. A series of reading promotion activities in Accra and Ghana to transform minds and promote life-long learning through books
2. The provision of assorted reading books and infrastructure to promote reading, including a reading and writing village in Accra
3. Implementation of policies to advance the Florence Agreement and promote the publication and use of books in Ghanaian languages, as part of developing the book industry
4. Promoting creative skills to address unemployment, substance abuse, truancy, and teenage pregnancy among the youth by equipping the target groups with creative and employable skills for socio-economic transformation
5. Promoting fundamental human rights, and access to information and books to advance the rights and access to information, and encourage publishing for social transformation
6. Showcasing and preserving Ghanaian arts and culture, and promoting inclusivity

Aside from the main theme, the slogan presented by Accra is ‘akwaaba, book a book’, which is meant to welcome the rest of Ghana and the world to the city, and to join its people in reading.

=== Strasbourg 2024 ===
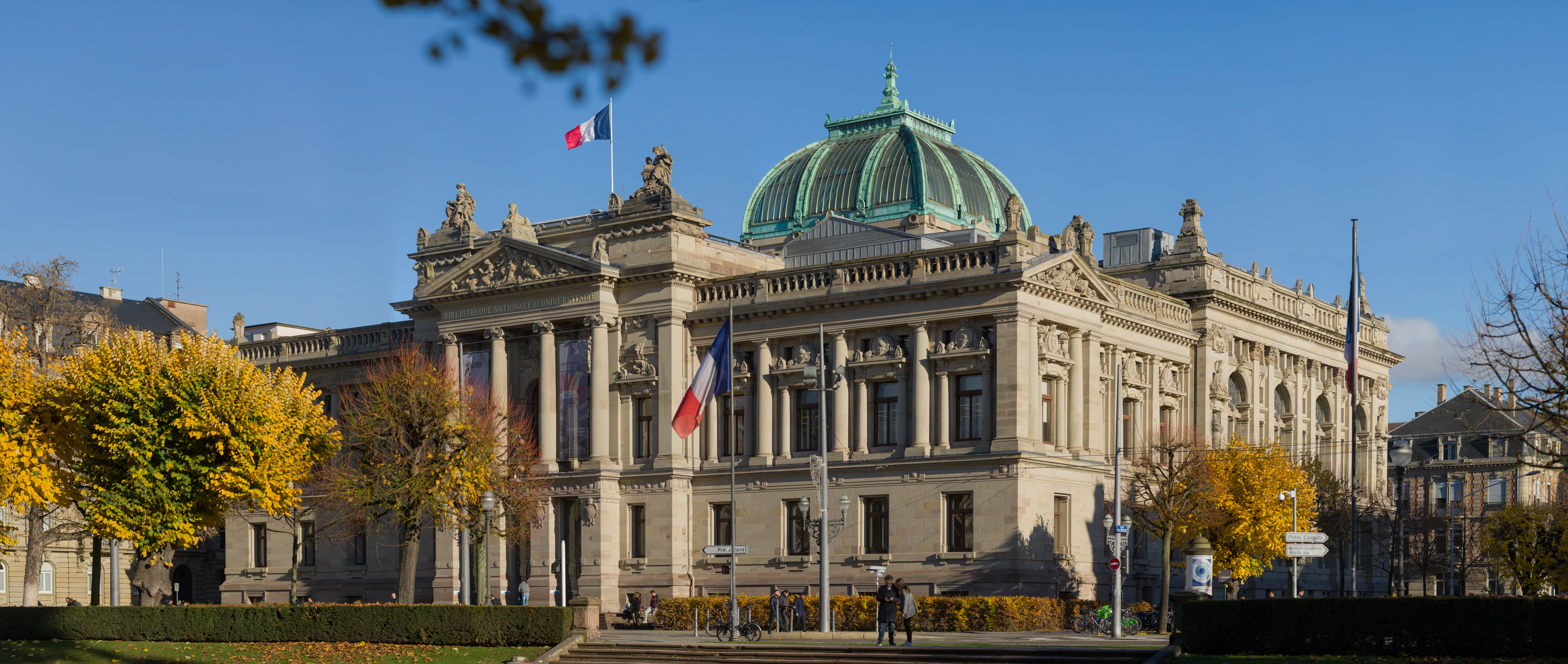
The National Academic Library in Strasbourg.

Theme: Read Our World

Located in the eastern part of France, the city of Strasbourg was chosen because of its strong focus on books to meet the challenges of social tensions and climate change, its literary heritage, the activities it organized that highlight many artistic disciplines, and its significant experience in organizing large-scale outward-looking events. The World Book Capital programme for 2024 in the city comprised 25 programmes and nearly 200 initiatives. They were structured around 5 cross-cutting areas of focus that represent the ideals of the city:

1. A city at the crossroads of ideas and debates
2. A creative and poetic city
3. A city of empowerment and ecology
4. A city of refuge
5. A child-friendly city

=== Rio de Janeiro 2025 ===
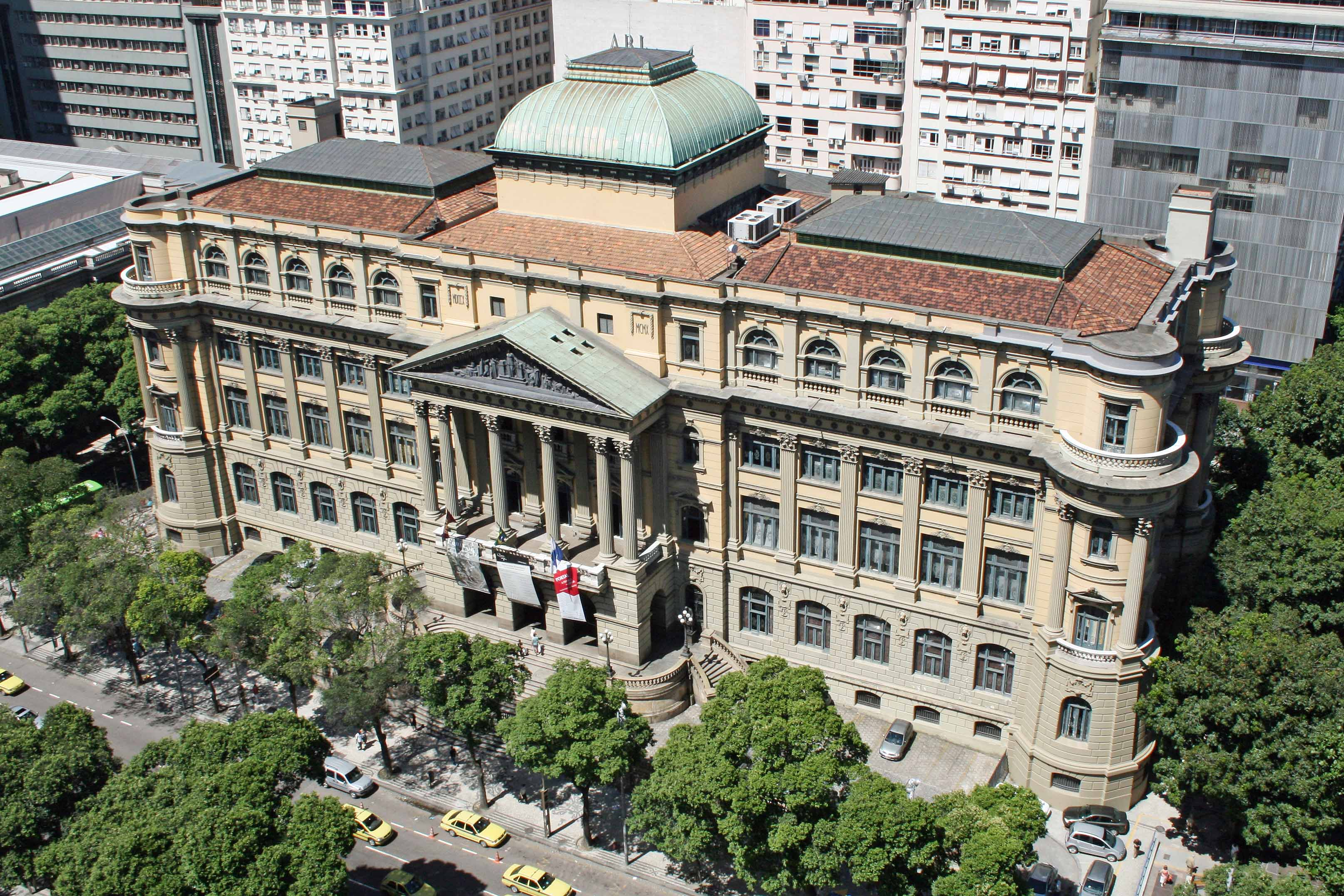
The National Library of Brazil in Rio de Janeiro, considered by UNESCO as the largest library in Latin America.

Theme: Rio de Janeiro Continues to Read

This marked the first time a Portuguese-speaking city received the World Book Capital designation. Rio de Janeiro in Brazil was chosen for its rich literary heritage, its cultural diversity, and its ongoing commitment to promoting reading and books in different areas of the city.

The celebration planned by the organising committee aimed at demonstrating the importance of Brazil's literary heritage alongside a clearly defined vision and action plan to promote literature, sustainable publishing, and reading among young people, tapping into digital technologies. Five anchor events were identified as part of the programme:

1. Rio Book Biennial
2. Night of the Books
3. Book on Rails
4. Book Parade Rio
5. Junior Editorial Academy

=== Rabat 2026 ===
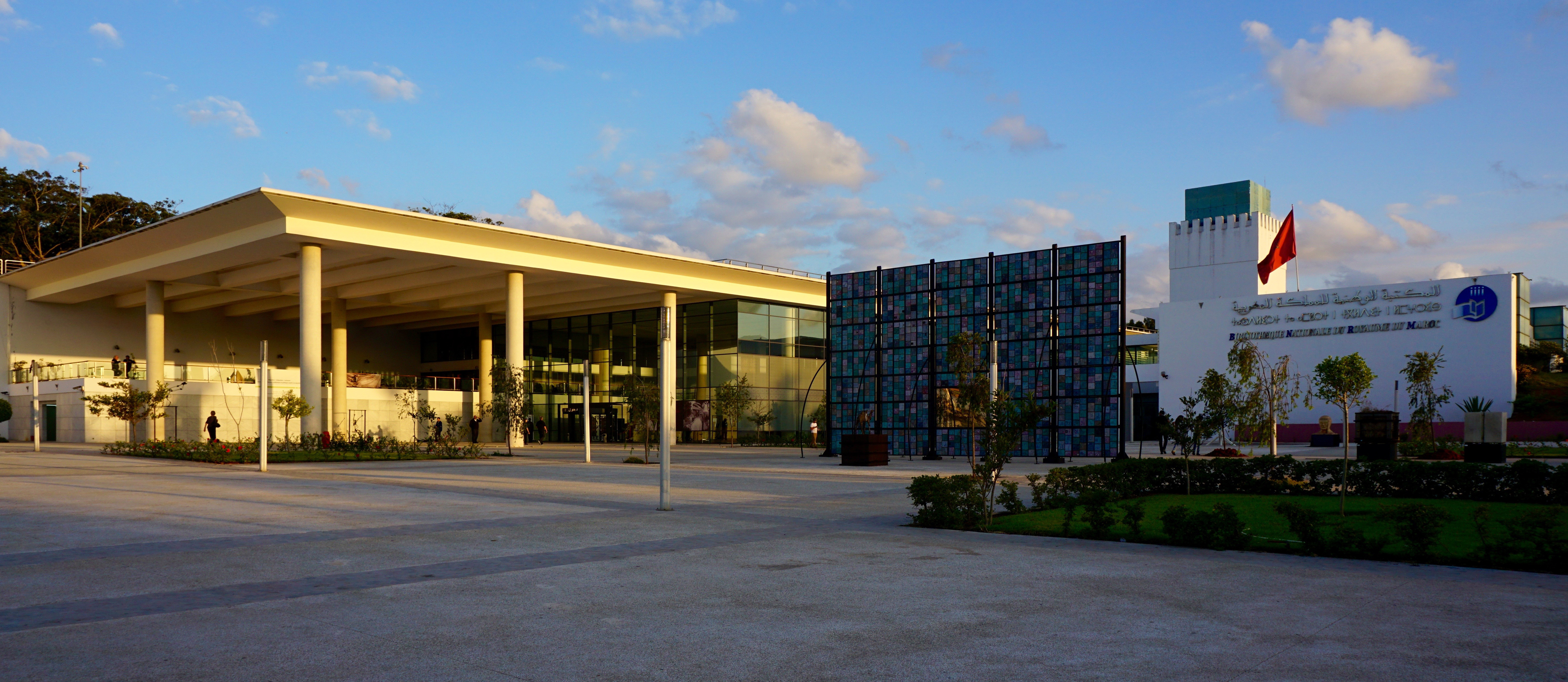
The National Library of Morocco in Rabat.

Theme: Rabat se Livre (Rabat Reveals Itself)

Rabat, the capital of Morocco, was selected for its clear commitment to literary development, the empowerment of women and youth through reading, and the fight against illiteracy, especially among underserved communities.

Some of the main highlights include Rabat International Book Fair, the third-largest in Africa, as well as literary tours, workshops, and cultural activities celebrating Rabat’s literary heritage and its contributions to global literary culture.

=== Medellín 2027 ===
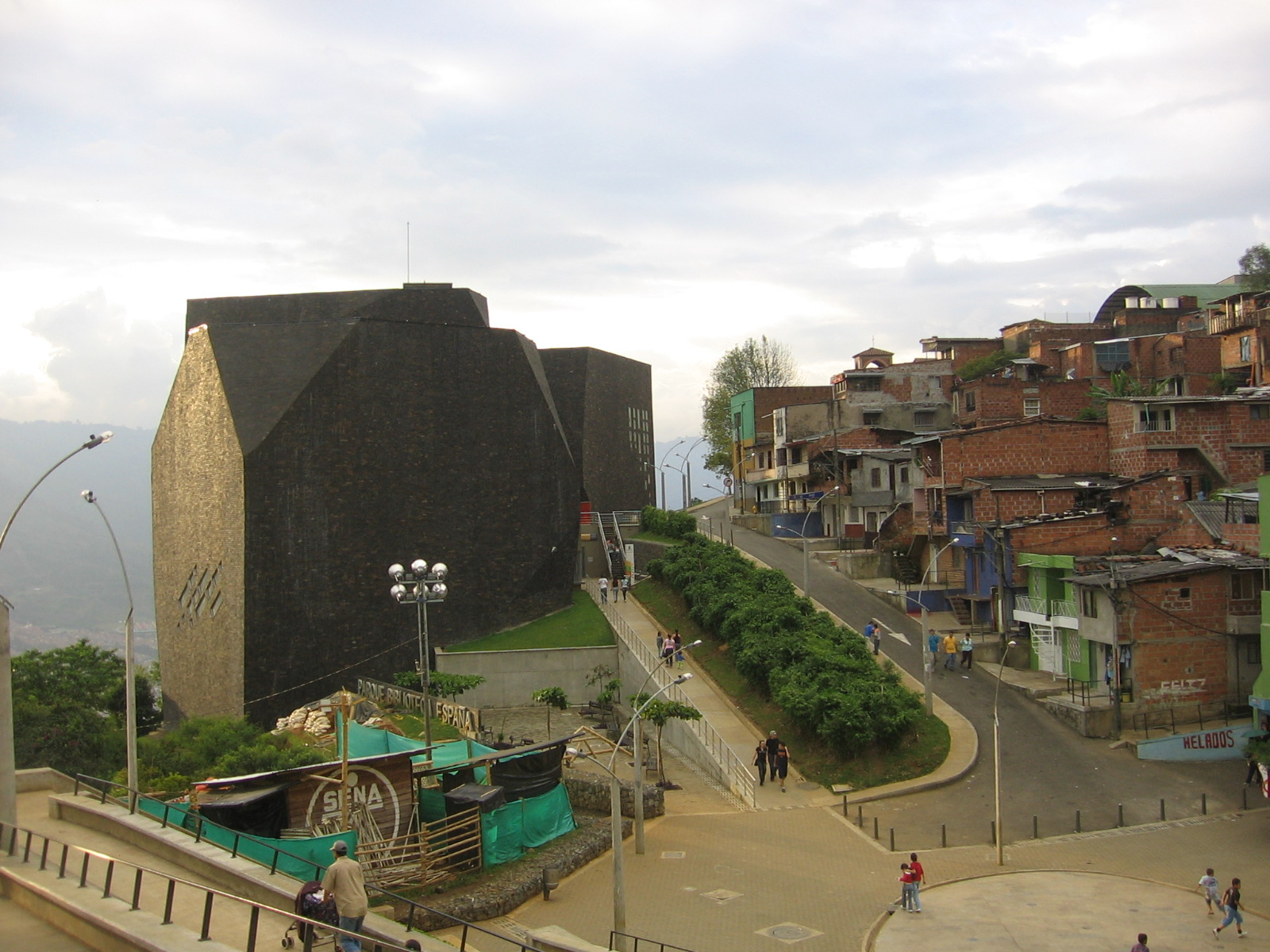
The Spain Library Park building in the Santo Domingo Savio neighborhood of Medellín.

Theme: TBD

The designation of Medellín 20 years after Bogotá (in 2007) makes Colombia the first country to host two World Book Capitals. The city was selected for its strong commitment to cultural mobilization and demonstrated capacity to host major cultural initiatives.

Other than leading the country's national reading index, it has made significant progress in strengthening the reading culture among its population, with the number of bookstores rising by about 540% over the past 70 years.

== Sources ==
This article incorporates text from a free content work. Licensed under CC BY-SA 3.0 IGO (license statement/permission). Text taken from UNESCO World Book Capital, UNESCO.

This article incorporates text from a free content work. Licensed under CC BY-SA 3.0 IGO (license statement/permission). Text taken from UNESCO World Book Capital, Call for Applications 2024, UNESCO.
