= Timeless Stories of El Salvador =

Series of fairytales and legends by Salvadoran author Federico Navarrete

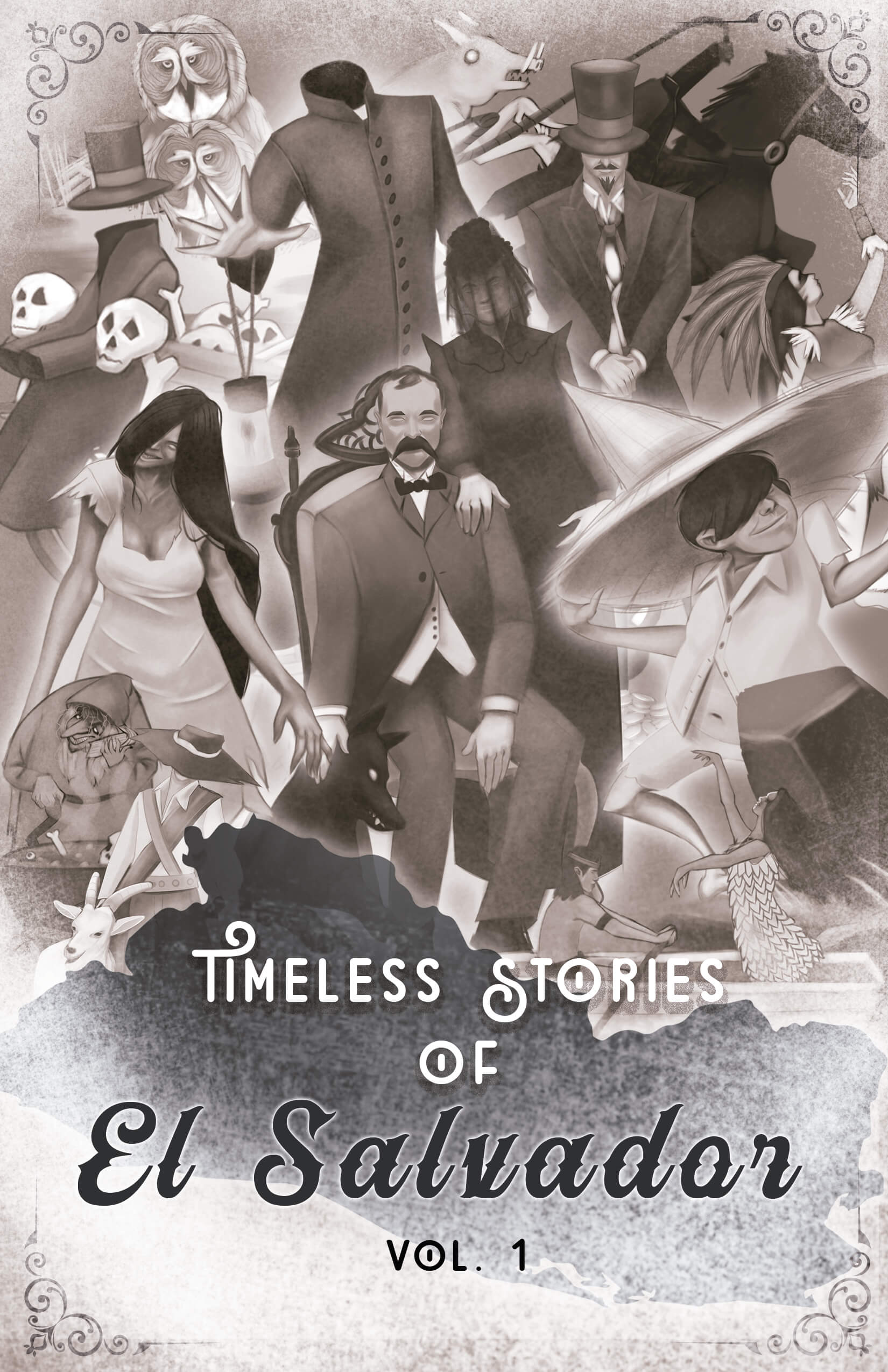
- Editor: Elizabeth Toole
- Author: Federico Navarrete
- Illustrator: Marcos Soriano
- Cover artist: Marcos Soriano
- Language: English
- Series: Timeless Stories of El Salvador
- Genres: Myth, Legends, Fairytales, Fantasy, and Horror
- Publisher: Independent
- Publication date: November 26, 2020
- Publication place: Poland
- Pages: 173
- ISBN: 979-8558368871

Timeless Stories of El Salvador is a series of fairytales and legends by Salvadoran author Federico Navarrete. The first volume was published in 2020 in Łódź, Poland, and the second was published in 2022 in Madrid, Spain. Both were published independently in collaboration with the Embassy of El Salvador in Germany.

The collection has since expanded to include comparative cultural works such as Spanish Mirrors (2026), which was presented at the Rabat International Book Fair (SIEL) in Morocco. The event took place during Rabat's year as the UNESCO World Book Capital for 2026.

Each volume contains thirty-one fairy tales and legends from across El Salvador. The vast majority were written and interpreted informally on a blog during the writer's stay in Poland. The stories are based on his experiences in El Salvador and books, newspapers, encyclopedias, and blogs he read over the years. This series of books is the first collection of Salvadoran folklore in English.

Spanish Mirrors introduces a comparative approach through ten thematic sections ("mirrors") and twenty stories that compare Salvadoran and Spanish legends. It is the first title in the series to be published in French, in addition to Spanish and English.

The stories that make up Timeless Stories of El Salvador, the first series of books by Federico Navarrete, focus on urban, colonial, indigenous legends (from mainly Pipil, Maya, and Lenca origins) as well as stories that have been transmitted by oral tradition for generations. Each story was adapted using cultural intelligence to reach the non-Spanish-speaking population.

The book collection was presented at the Buch Wien 2022 book fair in Vienna, Austria. As well as in a colloquium at the Instituto Cervantes in Vienna where Carlos Reyes and Rodrigo Elgueta from Chile, Santiago Roncagliolo from Peru, and Alicia Giménez Bartlett from Spain took part. The presentations were made in collaboration with the Instituto Cervantes in Vienna and the Embassy of El Salvador in Austria. Additionally, from 2023, the series has been presented at different events:

- The 82nd Madrid Book Fair thanks to the General Consulate of El Salvador in Spain.
- E-Day (Spanish Language Day) at the Instituto Cervantes of Beijing in collaboration with the Embassy of El Salvador in China.
- The Community Latin Talent Evening of the Hispanic Society of Victoria (Australia) on September 23 due to the efforts of the Consulate General of El Salvador in Melbourne.
- The 1st Ibero-American Literature Meeting in Istanbul during National Day of Spain (October 12, 2023). The presentation was a colloquium called "Historias Eternas" between Federico Navarrete and Héctor Abad Faciolince organized by the Instituto Cervantes in Istanbul in collaboration with the Embassy of El Salvador in Turkey.
- A presentation at the Instituto Cervantes in New Delhi (November 14, 2023), organized by the Embassies of El Salvador and Spain in India, and the Instituto Cervantes.
- In 2026, the series was presented at the Rabat International Book Fair (SIEL) and at a literary event at the Instituto Cervantes in Marrakech, Morocco, organized in collaboration with the Embassy of El Salvador in Morocco.

The first volume was translated into Spanish by Lilliam Armijo in 2022.

== Stories ==
The first volume contains:

- The good and the bad Cadejo
- The Siguanaba
- Cipitio
- The Headless Priest
- The Black Knight
- The Guirola Family
- The Partideño
- The Squeaky Wagon
- The Owls
- The Lady of the Rings
- The Cuyancua
- The Fair Judge of the Night
- The Managuas
- Chasca "The virgin of the water"
- The Fleshless Woman
- The Enchanted Ulupa Lagoon
- Our Lady Saint Anne
- The Midnight Yeller
- The Lempa River
- Devil's Door
- Comizahual "The white woman"
- Izalco Volcano
- The Moon's Cave
- The Amate Tree
- The Pig Witch
- The Tabudo
- Mr. Money and Mrs. Fortune
- Princess Naba and the Balsam Tree
- The Tamales Woman of Cuzcachapa Lagoon
- The Living Rock of Nahuizalco
- The Alegria Lagoon Siren

The second volume contains:

- Sir Francis Drake, The First Pirate of The Pacific
- The Death of The Sorcerer of La Nahuaterique
- The Mulus
- The Almighty Tlaloc
- The Mysterious Woman of The Toad River
- Lake Ilopango
- The Bewitched Wagon
- The Dwarf
- The Bandari Witch
- The Weeping Woman
- The Virgin of Izalco
- The Headless Horseman
- Tenancin, Cipitio's girlfriend
- Prince Atonal
- The Pirate Treasures of Meanguera Island
- The Black Horse
- Tangaloa "The Guardian of The Sea"
- The Cocoa
- Lake Coatepeque Snake
- The Woman of The Chinchontepec
- The Amate Flower
- Titilcíhuat "The Fire Woman"
- The Arbolarios
- Devil's Pool and its twin
- The Frogfish
- The Eruption of The San Salvador Volcano
- The Giantess of Jocoro
- The Bewitched Rock
- The Old Church of San Dionisio
- The Cukinca Cave
- Cuicuizcatl and The Chinchontepec Underworlds

Spanish Mirrors includes the following comparative sections:

- The Devil: The Black Knight; The Cave of Salamanca
- Fatal Lures: The Siguanaba; The Midnight Washerwomen
- Guardians & Beasts: The Good and the Bad Cadejo; The Dip
- Heralds & Executors of Death: The Mulus; The Urco
- Processions of the Dead: The Funeral of Chalchuapa; The Holy Company
- Rulers of the Night: The Fair Judge of the Night; Gaueko
- Echoes of the Dead: The Weeping Woman; The Ploranera
- Restless Spirits: The Headless Priest; The Ghost of San Ginés
- Fatal Apparitions: The Fleshless Woman; The Girl on the Curve
- Domestic Tricksters: The Dwarf; The Trasgu
