= Lilliam Armijo =

Salvadorian poetress

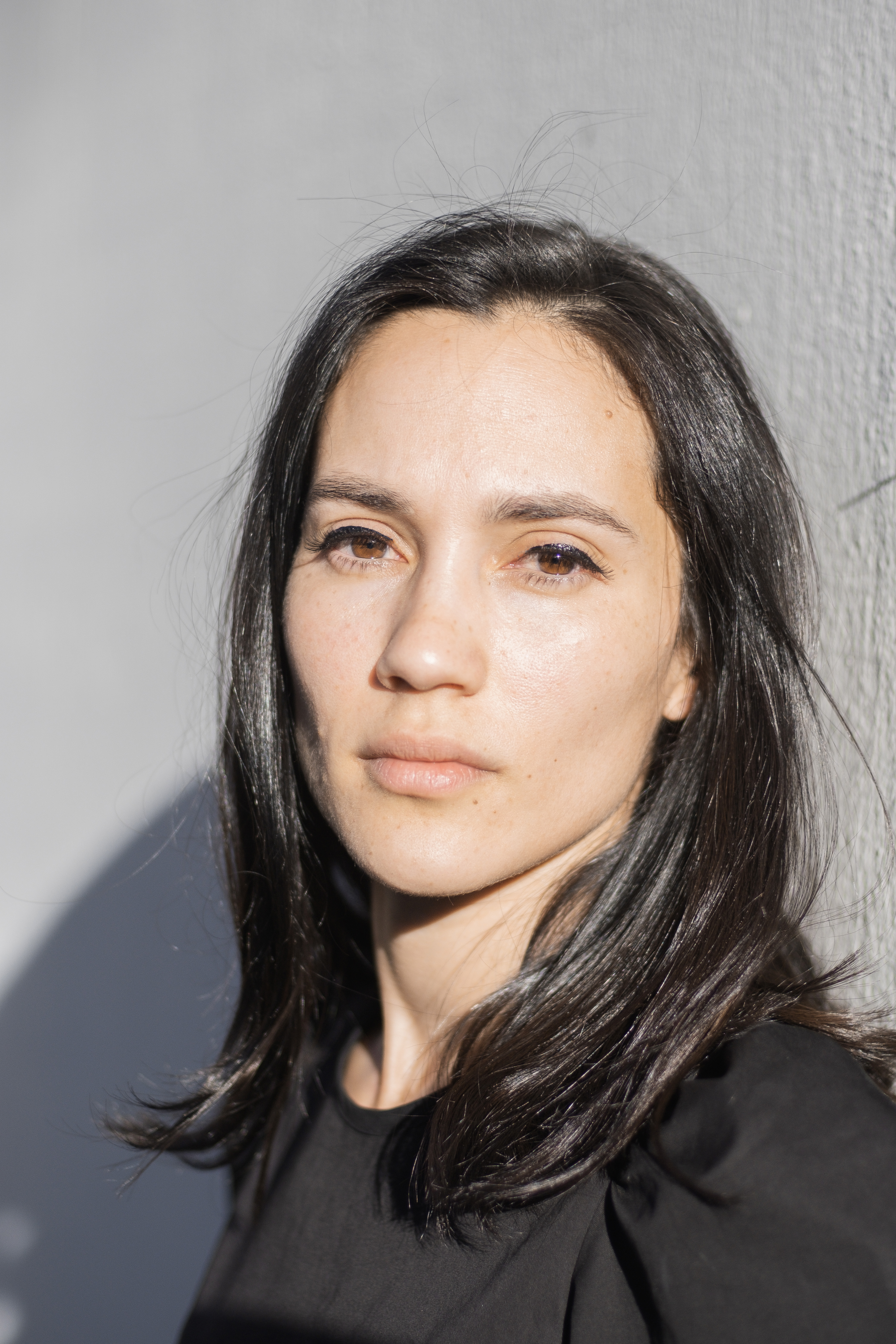
- Born: March 27, 1984; San Salvador
- Citizenship: Salvadoran
- Writing career
- Pen name: Alex Floyd
- Language: Spanish
- Genre: Poetry

Lilliam Armijo (San Salvador (El Salvador), March 27, 1984) is a Salvadoran poet and writer. She is the granddaughter of the poet Roberto Armijo.

== Early life and education ==
Lilliam Mercedes Armijo Martínez lived her childhood in Managua, Nicaragua, and in various Latin American countries due to the civil war in El Salvador, before moving back (to El Salvador) in 1992.

She studied her primary and secondary school at Colegio Externado de San José. She completed her University studies in International Relations in Costa Rica.

In 2007, she won the Miguel de Cervantes scholarship to study her Master's in Economic and Political Relations of Europe and Latin America in Madrid, Spain, at the Alcalá de Henares University and the Ortega y Gasset Institute.

She won a scholarship to work in Southeast Asia where she briefly worked for the United Nations and studied fashion design graduating with honors.

== Career ==
In 2013 she moved to West Africa where she worked for the NGO Save the Children as a communications officer.

She currently resides in Vienna, Austria.

In 2019, she won the National Floral Games with her poetry book "On the edge of the day". In 2020 she won the Floral Games for the second time in the field of poetry with her book "White Autumn".

In 2021 she won the Floral Games, for the last time with her book "Dos" dedicated to the Bicentennial. With this, she became the sixth woman in the history of El Salvador to obtain the title of Grand Master and one of the only 20 writers in the history of El Salvador to be a Grand Master. According to the qualifying jury, Armijo's publication "is a torrential book, refined in its language that invites continuous reading, since it is like a story in a poetic key, with the use of images and expressive richness, with sobriety"

In 2021, her children's story "Galazio and the Colored Comet" was selected to be part of the children's reading anthology Crecer Leyendo, part of the "Tree of Life" collection, translated into Braille and Salvadoran Sign Language (LESSA). Around 250,000 free books were produced for public and private schools in El Salvador. Armijo received, along with other authors and illustrators, recognition for her work in early childhood, from the first lady Gabriela de Bukele, the Minister of Education Carla Hananía de Varela, and the Vice Minister of Culture Mariemm Pleitez.

Armijo is internationally recognized and has made several international artistic collaborations. Moreover, in 2022, she translated into Spanish Timeless Stories of El Salvador, Volume 1.

According to Disruptive Magazine "30 years after the signing of the Peace Accords, today's youth continues to write poetry (like Vladimir Amaya, Lilliam Armijo, Lourdes Ferrufino, among others)."

== Collaborations ==
Selected examples of Armijo's collaborations include:

- MEMORIAL PARA LAS REFLEXIONES FILOSÓFICAS: "El Muro Intangible" (2019).
