= Rabat International Book Fair =

International book fair in Morocco

Rabat International Book Fair معرض الرباط الدولي للكتاب
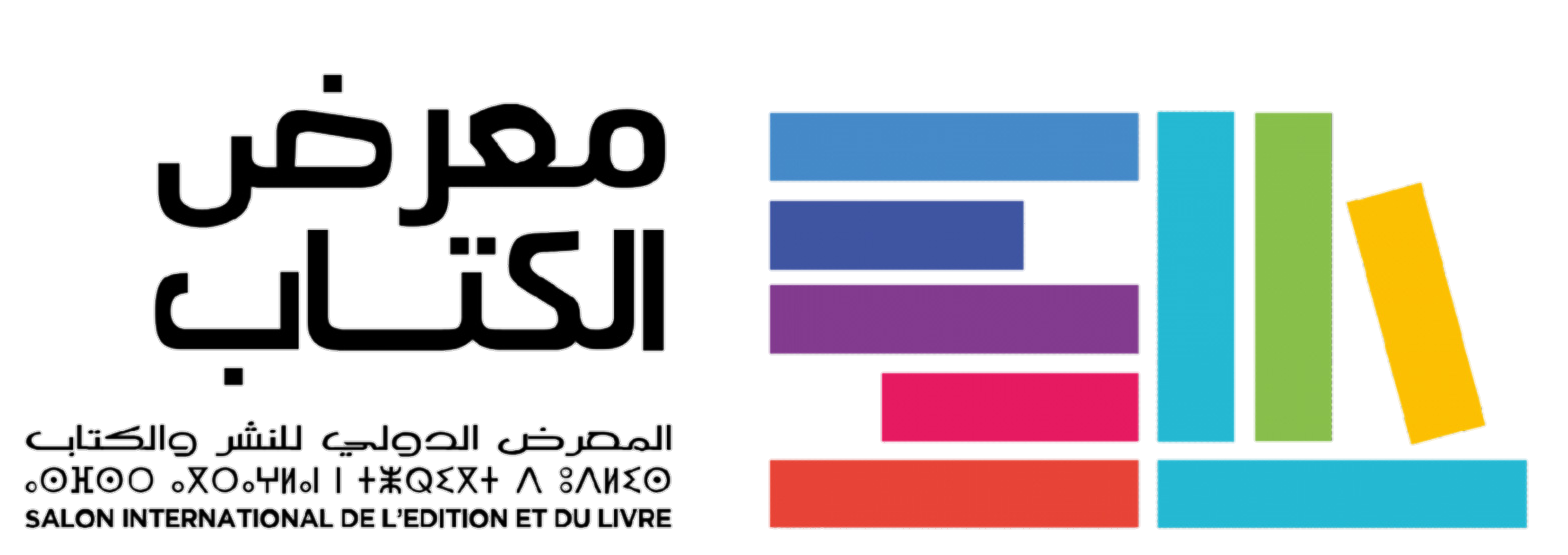
- Genre: Book fair
- Date: May
- Frequency: Annually
- Locations: Rabat, Morocco
- Coordinates: 33.604362°N 7.629204°W
- Country: Morocco
- Inaugurated: 1987
- Area: 20,000 m^{2}
- Organiser: Ministry of Youth, Culture and Communication

The Rabat International Book Fair (French: Salon international de l'édition et du livre, SIEL; Arabic: معرض الرباط الدولي للكتاب) is an annual book fair held in Rabat, Morocco.

It is the largest book fair in Morocco, and one of the most significant annual events in Moroccan literature. It is held for over ten days every February, under the patronage of King Mohammed VI. The Ministry of Youth, Culture and Communication organizes the fair in conjunction with the Moroccan Agency for Development, Investment, and Export, and the Office of Fairs and Expositions.

The book fair covers a surface area of 20,000 m^{2}, making it one of Morocco's largest cultural events. It attracts a number of cultural organizations and actors, including foreign missions, religious organizations, authors, artists, and publishers, in addition to visitors of all ages and backgrounds.

== Activities and cultural program ==
Each year, approximately 700 publishing houses from 44 different countries, specializing in various fields of knowledge, participate in the book fair, in addition to cultural organizations, research centers, universities, and non-profit organizations.

The National Reading Award is presented during the book fair.

== Children's wing ==
In every year of the book fair, there is a wing reserved for publishing houses dedicated to children's books. The event aims to promote literacy among Moroccan children through a number of initiatives designed to encourage reading among children.

== Guests of honor ==
List of guests of honor by year
| Year | Edition | Country or Organization |
|---|---|---|
| 2026 | 31 | France |
| 2025 | 30 | Sharjah |
| 2024 | 29 | UNESCO |
| 2023 | 28 | Quebec |
| 2022 | 27 | African literature |
| 2020 | 26 | Mauritania |
| 2019 | 25 | Spain |
| 2018 | 24 | Egypt |
| 2017 | 23 | ECCAS |
| 2016 | 22 | United Arab Emirates |
| 2015 | 21 | Palestine |
| 2014 | 20 | ECOWAS |
| 2013 | 19 | Libya |
| 2012 | 18 | Saudi Arabia |
| 2011 | 17 | Italy |
| 2010 | 16 | Moroccan diaspora |
| 2009 | 15 | Senegal |
| 2008 | 14 | France |
| 2007 | 13 | Wallonia |
| 2006 | 12 | Maghreb |
| 2005 | 11 | Spain |
| 2004 | 10 | Mexico / Chile |

== Awards presented ==
- Prize of Morocco for Literature
- Prize of Morocco for Human Sciences
- Prize of Morocco for Social Sciences
- Prize of Morocco for Literary, Artistic, and Linguistic Studies
- Prize of Morocco for Translation
