= List of arrested journalists in Turkey =

Alleged sympathies of the detained Turkish journalists between 2016 and 2019

Many journalists in Turkey are being persecuted and kept in jail all over the country. Below is an extensive list of the prisoners, past and present.

231 journalists have been arrested in Turkey after 15 July 2016 alone. According to the Gülen movement-linked (which is designated as a terrorist organization by Turkey, Pakistan, and the GCC) advocacy group Stockholm Center for Freedom that tracks cases of prosecutions of Turkish journalists, in the year 2018, 122 journalists received a jail sentence in the country.

== List of arrested journalists ==
The following is a non-exhaustive list of arrested journalists in Turkey: A new updated and searchable list of jailed journalists is compiled by Stockholm Center for Freedom which stated that 165 journalists had been arrested, 88 convicted and 167 wanted by the authorities as of 8 May 2020.

Arrested journalists in Turkey
Name	Media	Position	Date arrested	Status	Background info
Doğa Baskan	Evrensel	correspondent in Ankara	2026-06-25	Released on 2026-06-27	Arrested and put into custody as a flight risk (despite turning herself in) due to being charged for spreading misleading information to the public, released on appeal two days later.
Abdulcebbar Karabeğ	Azadiya Welat	correspondent in Mersin	2010-09-26	Released on 2012-11-02	detained at the closed prison of Hatay
Cevheri Güven	Nokta	Editor-in-Chief	2015-11-03	Released on 2015-12-29; tried in absentia and now in exile	Arrested over a cover story critical of the government. Sentenced to 22 years and 6 mounts in prison in absentia in 2017 for "inciting an armed uprising." The magazine was closed by decree in 2016.
Abdullah Çetin	Dicle Haber Ajansı	correspondent in Kurtalan, Siirt Province	2011-12-16	Released on 2014-06-25	detained at the D-Type prison in Diyarbakır
Abdullah Civan	Today's Zaman		2016-09-02	Convicted on 2017-5-26	convicted to 10 years and 5 months, detained in İzmir
Abdullah Kılıç	Meydan	correspondent	2016-07-25	Convicted and jailed pending trial	Sentenced to 6 years and 3 months on 8 March 2018. Imprisoned in the Silivri prison, İstanbul
Abdülkader Civan	Today's Zaman		2016-09-02	Convicted	Sentenced to more than 10 years imprisonment on 26 May 2017
Adnan Bilen	Mezopotamya Agency	journalist	2020-10-9	Released in April 2021	imprisoned for about 6 months
Abdurrahman Gök	Dicle Haber Ajansı	journalist	24 March 2009	Released in November 2009	
Abdurrahman Öncü	Pia	Camera operator	2022-06-16	Arrested	
Ahmet Altan	Taraf	journalist	2016-09-10	Released 2021-04-21	Sentenced to life in prison with solitary confinement in 2018. Released after an appeal to the European Court of Human Rights and a ruling of the Court of Cassation
Ahmet Akyol	Dicle Haber Ajansı	correspondent in Adana	2011-05-09	Released on 2012-11-06	Was detained at the M-Type prison in Ceyhan, Adana
Ahmet Birsin	Gün TV	general coordinator	2009-04-14	Convicted	Sentenced to 21 years for administrating a terrorist organization in March 2017
Ahmet Böken	TRT		2016-08-18	Convicted	Sentenced to 9 years and 9 months imprisonment.
Mehmet Bilal Colak	TRT		2016-08-18	Convicted	Sentenced to 9 years imprisonment.
Ahmet Şık	Cumhuriyet		3 March 2011/2016-12-30	12 March 2012/released pending trial in March 2018	First arrest is part of Ergenekon trials. Sentenced to 7 years and 6 months imprisonment on second arrest
Ahmet Torun	TRT				Sentenced to 7 years and 5 months imprisonment.
Ali Konar	Azadiya Welat	correspondent in Elazig	2010-05-27	Convicted	Sentenced to 7 years and 6 months on 22 October 2015
Ali Özparun	TRT			Jailed pending trial	
Ali Ünal	Yeni Hayat		2016-08-16	Convicted 2018-11-14, pending trial	Sentenced to 19 years and 6 months, detained in the F Type prison Buca Kırıklar
Arif Çelebi				Released on 2014-05-08	detained during 7 years and 8 months
Aykut Yildir	TRT			Jailed pending trial	
Ayşe Oyman	Özgür Gündem	editor	2011-12-24	Released on 2014-03-03	detained at the L-Type women prison in Bakırköy, Istanbul
Aysenur Parildak	Zaman		2016-08-11	Arrested	sentenced to 7 years and 6 months imprisonment
Aytekin Gezici	Seyhan Belediyesi		2016-08-26	Detained pending appeal	sentenced to 9 years in prison on 16 February 2018
Aziz Tekin	Azadiya Welat	correspondent in Mardin	2012-01-29	Arrested	detained at the E-Type prison in Mardin
Aziz Oruç	Mezapotamya Agency		2022-06-16	Arrested	
Barış Polat	Mezapotamya Agency			Convicted in January 2020	sentenced to 6 years and 3 months
Bayram Kaya	Yeni Hayat		2016-07-29	Arrested, jailed pending trial	sentenced to 6 years and 3 months on 8 March 2018
Bayram Namaz	Atılım	writer	2006-09-10	Released on 2014-05-08	detained during 7 years and 8 months at the F-Type prison in Edirne
Bedri Adanır	Aram Yayınları, Hawar	general director	2010-01-08	Released on 2012-11-27	detained during 689 days at the D-Type prison in Diyarbakır
Berivan Altan	Mezopotamya Agency	journalist	2022-10-30	Arrested	
Cemil Uğur	Mezopotamya Agency		2020-10-09	Released in April 2021	imprisoned for about 6 months
Cengiz Kapmaz	Özgür Gündem	writer	2011-11-26	Convicted	
Cengiz Dogan	Azadiya Welat		2009-04-20	Convicted	Sentenced to 17 years and 1 month in prison.
Çağdaş Kaplan	Dicle Haber Ajansı	correspondent in Istanbul	2011-12-20	Released on 2013-02-11	detained at the F-Type prison in Kandira
Cuma Ulus	Can Erzincan TV		2016-08-06	Convicted	Sentenced to 6 years 3 months imprisonment on 8 March 2018
Davut Uçar	Etik Ajans	director	2011-12-24	Arrested	detained at the F-Type prison in Kandira
Deniz Nazlım	Mezopotamya agency	journalist	2022-10-30	Arrested	
Deniz Yıldırım	Aydınlık	Chief editor	2009-11-09	Released in March 2014	sentenced for leaking a phone conversation of Erdogan to the media
Deniz Yücel	Die Welt, taz	journalist	2017-02-14	Released on 2018-02-16	jailed in Istanbul
Derek Stoffel	CBC News	journalist	2013-06-12	Released on 2013-06-12	
Dilşah Ercan	Azadiya Welat	correspondent in Mersin	2011-12-24	Arrested	detained at the M-Type prison in Ceyhan, Adana
Dilek Demiral	Özgür Gündem	journalist	2010-09-26	Released on 2014-03-03	detained at the L-Type women prison in Bakırköy, Istanbul
Diren Yurtsever	Mezopotamya agency	Editor in chief	2022-10-30	arrested	
Ebru Umar	Metro, Libelle	journalist, writer, columnist	2016-04-23	(Partly) released on 2016-04-24	Dutch journalist, arrested because of insulting Turkish president Erdoğan. Umar is prohibited to leave Turkey for the Netherlands awaiting further investigation.
Eda Akıllı Şanlı	Bizim Antalya	columnist	2016-07-25	Released pending trial 2016-12-18	
Emrullah Acar	Mezopotamya Agency	correspondent	2022-10-30	Arrested	
Ekrem Dumanlı	Zaman Gazetesi	general director	2014-12-14	Released on 2014-12-19	
Elif Üngür	PEL productions	presenter	2022-06-16	arrested	
Emre Soncan	Zaman	correspondent	2016-07-24	Convicted, jailed pending trial	sentenced to 10 years and 5 months on 10 April 2018
Enis Berberoğlu	Sözcü		2017-06-14	Released on 20 September 2018	Sentenced to 25 years on 14 June 2017, the sentence was lowered to 5 years and 10 months on 13 February 2018. Released until the end of his term as MP of the Turkish Parliament.
Erdal Süsem	Eylül	editor	2010-02-10	Convicted	Convicted to life in prison
Erol Zavar	Odak	director	2007-01-20	Arrested	detained at the F-Type prison in Sincan, Ankara
Ersin Şanlı	TRT	manager	2016-7-20	Arrested	
Ertuğ Bozkurt	Dicle Haber Ajansı	editor	2011-12-24	Arrested	detained at the F-Type prison in Kandira
Faruk Akkan	Cihan		2016-08-04	Arrested	sentenced to 9 years imprisonment
Fatih Özgür Aydın			2011-07-25	Arrested	
Fatma Koçak	Dicle Haber Ajansı	director	2011-12-24	Arrested	detained at the L-Type women prison in Bakırköy, Istanbul
Faysal Tunç	Dicle Haber Ajansı	correspondent in Sirnak	2007-04-05	Convicted	Sentenced twice to 6 years and 3 months
Ferhat Çiftçi	Azadiya Welat	correspondent in Gaziantep	2011-02-16	Arrested	detained at the H-Type women prison in Gaziantep
Füsun Erdoğan	Özgür Radyo	general coordinator	2006-09-10	Released on 2014-05-08	detained during 7 years and 8 months at the T-Type prison in Kandira
Gurbetelli Ersöz	Özgür Gündem	Editor-in-Chief	1994-01-12	June 1994	
Gülnaz Yıldız	Mücadele Birliği		2012-04-26	Convicted	Sentenced to 3 years and 9 months in prison
Gülsen Aslan	Dicle Haber Ajansı	correspondent in Batman	2012-02-20	Released on 2012-10-15	detained at the M-Type prison in Batman
Habip Güler	Zaman	correspondent	2016-07-25	Convicted, jailed pending trial	sentenced to 6 years and 3 months on 8 March 2018. Detained in Silivri Prison.
Hakan Soytemiz			2010-09-25	Released on 2012-09-24	
Hakan Yalçın	Mezopotamya Agency	Journalist	2022-10-30	Arrested	
Halil İbrahim Balta	Zaman, Yarına Bakış	correspondent	2016-07-25	Convicted, jailed pending trial	sentenced to 6 years and 3 months on 8 March 2018
Hanim Büşra Erdal	Yeni Hayat		2016-07-29	Convicted, jailed pending trial	sentenced to 6 years and 3 months on 8 March 2018
Hamit Dilbahar	Azadiya Welat	writer	2010-02-13	Convicted	Sentenced to 16 years imprisonment.
Hamza Güneri Gök	TRT		2017-01-30	Convicted	Sentenced to 6 years and 3 months on 26 February 2019.
Hasan Özgüneş	Azadiya Welat	writer	2011-10-28	Arrested	detained at the F-Type prison in Kandira
Hatice Duman	Atılım	director	2003-04-01	Convicted	sentenced to life imprisonment. Detained at the M-Type prison in Gebze
Hayati Yildiz	Azadiya Welat		2017-03-01	Released pending trial	Released pending trial 20 September 2017
Hidayet Karaca	Samanyolu TV	owner	2014-12-14	Convicted	sentenced to 31 years imprisonment on 3 November 2017.
Hikmet Çiçek			2008-03-25	Released 2014-03-10	Part of Ergenekon trials
Hüseyin Deniz	Evrensel	correspondent	2011-12-24	Released on 2014-03-27	detained at the F-Type prison in Kandira
İdris Sayılğan	Mezopotamya ajansi	journalist	2020-03-02	currently arrested	He was previously arrested for 1,137 days between 2016 and 2019 Sentenced to 4 years for terrorist propaganda
İlker İlkan	Azadiya Welat		2016-09-09	Released pending trial	Released 12 October 2017
Ismail Yıldız	Dersim	director	2011-12-24	Released on 2013-02-11	detained at the F-Type prison in Kandira
Jake Hanrahan	Popular Front	journalist	2015-8-27	Deported to UK after a week	Arrested after being "accused of working on behalf of a terrorist organisation and assisting Islamic State" while covering disturbances in Diyarbakir.
Kadri Gürsel	Cumhuriyet	journalist	2016-10	Released on 2017-09-25	He was accused, together with other Cumhuriyet staff, in the case on terrorism charges, with the Kurdistan Workers’ Party (PKK), the Revolutionary People's Liberation Party-Front (DHKP-C), and the Fethullahist Organization (FETÖ) among the groups named in the indictments.
Kamuran Sunbat	Dicle Haber Ajansı	correspondent	11-09-2011	Arrested	the former Cukurova correspondent of the pro-Kurdish Dicle News Ajansi (DiHA), was arrested in 2011. He was convicted over alleged links to outlawed Kurdish militant groups and is currently serving a sentence of 11 years, 11 months in prison.
Kenan Baş	Zaman	correspondent	2016-07-25	Released on 29 March 2017, pending trial	
Kenan Karavil	Radyo Dünya	general director	2009-12-11	Released on 2010-10-22	detained at the F-Type prison in Kürkçüler, Adana
Kenan Kırkaya	Dicle Haber Ajansı	correspondent in Ankara	2011-12-24	Released on 2014-03-27	detained at the F-Type prison in Kandira
Mazlum Doğan Güler	Pia	camera operator	2022-06-16	Arrested	
Mazlum Dolan	Dicle Haber Ajansı	correspondent in Diyarbakır	2016-02-19	Released pending trial	released after serving 15 months in Diyarbakir Prison
Mazlum Özdemir	Dicle Haber Ajansı	editor	2011-12-24	Released on 2014-03-27	detained at the F-Type prison in Kandira
Mediha Olgun	Sözcü		2017-05-26	Released pending trial	Released pending trial 22 September 2017
Mehmet Akif Öztürk	TRT		2019-02-26		Sentenced to 8 years and 9 months in prison
Mehmet Anıl	Etkin Haber		2016-10-07	Released pending trial the 2016-12-14	
Mehmet Aslan	Mezapotamya Ajansi	journalist	2021-01-05	Arrested pending trial	
Mehmet Baransu	Taraf	correspondent and columnist	2015-03-02		detained at the Metris Prison
Mehmet Dener			2016-07-22	Released pending trial 2017-03-24	
Mehmet Emin Yıldırım	Azadiya Welat	general director	2011-12-24	Released on 2014-03-27	detained at the F-Type prison in Kandira
Mehmet Ali Ertaş	Xwebun	editor	2022-06-16	Arrested	
Mehmet Güneş	Türkiye Gerçeği	writer	???-??-??	Released on 2012-10-05	detained during 310 days at the F-Type Tekirdağ number 2 prison
Mehmet Haberal	Kanal B	owner	2009-04-17	Released on 6 September 2013	Part of Ergenekon trials
Mehmet Şahin	Piya productions	presenter	2022-06-16	Arrested	
Mehmet Yeşiltepe	Devrimci Hareket	writer	2009-04-30	Arrested	detained at the F-Type prison in Tekirdağ
Miktat Algül	Mersin Mezitli FM (radio) and Ulus Newspaper		2010-05-17	Arrested	Sentenced to 60 years and 5 months in prison.
Mohammed Rasool	Popular Front	journalist	2015-8-27	Released the following January	Arrested after being "accused of working on behalf of a terrorist organisation and assisting Islamic State" while covering disturbances in Diyarbakir.
Murat Aksoy		journalist	2017-04	Released on 2017-10-25	Jailed pending trial over suspected links to the FETÖ media network. He was accused of "being a member of a terror group" and of "participating in a coup attempt."
Murat Aydın			2011-10-22	Arrested	
Murat Öztürk	Çorum Manşet		2016-08-21	Released pending trial	Released pending trial 16 May 2017
Musa Kart	Yürüyüş		2012-09-18	Arrested	detained in Silivri Prison
Mustafa Balbay	Cumhuriyet	correspondent in Ankara	2009-03-06	Released on 2013-12-09	detained at the E-type prison in Sincan, Ankara for 4 years and 277 days. Part of Ergenekon trials
Mustafa Gök	Ekmek ve Adalet	correspondent in Ankara	2004-02-19	Convicted	Sentenced to life in prison for attempting to change the constitutional order by force.
Mustafa Ünal	Yeni Hayat		2016-07-29	Convicted	Sentenced to 10 years and 6 months on 8 July 2018
Mümtaz'er Türköne	Yarına Bakış		03-08-2016	Released 2020-09-24	Sentenced to 10 years 6 months on 6 July 2018, but released following an appeal.
Müyesser Yıldız	Odatv		February 2011/8 June 2020	Released June 2012/released 9 November 2020	First arrest is part of Ergenekon trials
Nahide Ermiş	Demokratik Modernite	board member	2011-12-24	Released on 2014-01-14	detained at the L-Type women prison in Bakirköy, Istanbul
Nazlı Ilıcak	Bulvar, Bugün, Hurriyet	publisher, journalist	2016-07-29	Convicted/Jailed Pending Appeal	Sentenced to life in prison with solitary confinement in 2018. She was released on 5 November 2019.
Nedim Türfent	Dicle Haber Ajansı	correspondent in Van	2016-05-12	Released on 29 November 2022	Sentenced to 8 years and 9 months in prison on 15 December 2017
Neşe Toprak	PEL	TV host	2022-06-16	Arrested	
Nevin Erdemir	Özgür Gündem	editor	2011-12-24	Released on 2014-03-27	detained at the L-Type women prison in Bakirköy, Istanbul
Nilgün Yıldız	Dicle Haber Ajansı	correspondent in Mardin	2011-12-24	Arrested	detained at the L-Type women prison in Bakirköy, Istanbul
Nurettin Fırat	Özgür Gündem	writer	2011-12-24	Arrested	detained at the F-Type prison in Kandira
Nuri Yeşil	Azadiya Welat	correspondent in Tunceli	2010-05-27	Arrested	detained at the E-Type prison in Elbistan
Oktay Candemir	Dicle Haber Ajansı	journalist	2011-12-24	Released on 2012-11-16	detained at the F-Type prison in Kandira
Olgun Matur	Bizim Antalya	owner	2016-07-25	Arrested	
Ömer Çelik	Dicle Haber Ajansı	correspondent in Istanbul	2016-12-24	released in October 2017	detained at the F-Type prison in Kandira
Ömer Çelik	program Views from Amed	presenter	2022-06-16	arrested	
Ömer Çiftçi	Demokratik Modernite	owner	2011-12-24	Released on 2013-02-11	detained at the F-Type prison in Kandira
Ömer Faruk Çalışkan	Özgür Halk	general director	2008-07-19	Arrested	detained at the F-Type prison in Kandira
Ozan Kılınç	Azadiya Welat	Editor	2010-07-22	Convicted	Sentenced to 32 years in prison.
Özlem Ağuş	Dicle Haber Ajansı	correspondent in Adana	2011-12-24	Arrested	detained at the women prison in Karatas, Adana
Pervin Yerlikaya	Dicle Haber Ajansı	correspondent in Istanbul accountant	2011-12-24	Released on 2013-02-11	detained at the L-Type prison in Bakirköy, Istanbul
Philip Pendlebury	Popular Front	journalist	2015-8-27	Deported to UK after a week	Arrested after being "accused of working on behalf of a terrorist organisation and assisting Islamic State" while covering disturbances in Diyarbakir.
Ramazan Pekgöz	Günlük	editor	2011-12-20	Released in 2014-05-12	
Sadık Topaloğlu	Dicle Haber Ajansı	correspondent in Urfa	2011-12-24	Arrested	detained at the F-Type prison in Kandira
Safiye Alagaş	JinNews	journalist	2022-06-16	Arrested	
Saša Petricic	CBC News	journalist	2013-06-12	Released on 2013-06-12	
Selahattin Aslan	Demokratik Modernite		2011-12-24	Arrested	detained at the F-Type prison in Kandira
Selma Tatli	Zaman		2018-11-28	Arrested pending trial	
Semiha Alankuş	Demokratik Modernite		2011-12-24	Released on 2014-03-27	detained at the F-Type prison in Kandira
Serdar Altan	Dicle-Firat Journalists Association	Co-Chair	2022-06-16	Arrested	
Serkan Canbaz	TRT		2016-12-30	Convicted	Sentenced to 6 years and 10 months 15 days in prison on 16 February 2019.
Sevcan Atak	Özgür Halk	editor	2010-06-18	Arrested	Sentenced to 7 years and 6 months in prison.
Seyithan Akyüz	Azadiya Welat	correspondent in Adana	2009-12-11	Arrested	sentenced in 4 trials to 21 years and 9 months in total.
Sibel Güler	Özgür Gündem	journalist	2011-12-24	Released on 2014-03-03	detained at the L-Type women prison in Bakirköy Istanbul
Sinan Aygül	Dicle Haber Ajansı	correspondent in Bitlis	2011-01-23	Released on 2012-11-07	detained at the E-Type prison in Muş
Şirin Çoban	Azadiya Welat		2016-09-09	Released pending trial	Released on 12 October 2017
Soner Yalçın	OdaTV, Hürriyet	owner, journalist	2011-02-14	Released on 2012-12-27	detained at the L-Type prison in Silivri. Part of Ergenekon trials
Suat Doğuhan	PEL productions	owner	2022-06-16	Arrested	
Sultan Şaman	Hevîya Jinê	editor	2012-02-07	Arrested	detained at the M-Type prison in Batman
Şahabettin Demir	Dicle Haber Ajansı	correspondent in Van	2010-09-05	Convicted	Sentenced to 15 years in prison.
Şükrü Sak	Akıncı Yol ve Baran Dergisi	general director	2010-04-26	Arrested	detained at the E-Type prison in Sivas
Tayip Temel	Azadiya Welat	writer	2011-10-08	Arrested	detained at the D-Type prison in Diyarbakir
Tuncay Özkan	ex-Kanaltürk	owner	2008-09-27	Released on 10 March 2014	detained at the L-Type prison in Silivri. Part of Ergenekon trials
Tunca Öğreten	Diken	journalist	25-12-2016	Released 6 December 2017	concerning the emails of Berat Albayrak, the son-in law of Recep Tayyip Erdogan and sentenced for Insulting the president
Turabi Kişin	Özgür Gündem	editor	2012-01-02	Arrested	detained at the F-Type prison in Kandira
Turgut Usul	TRT	presenter	2018-01-04	Arrested	jailed pending trial.
Turhan Özlü	Ulusal Kanal	general director	2011-10-08	Arrested	detained at the L-Type prison in Silivri
Ünal Tanik	Rotahaber		18-01-2017	Arrested	Sentenced to 6 years 3 months imprisonment on 8 March 2018.
Vedat Demir	Yarına Bakış	columnist	2016-08-03	Released on 2017-02-17	detained at the Silivri Prison
Yalçın Küçük		writer	2011-03-07	Released 2014-03-10	detained at the L-Type prison in Silivri. Part of Ergenekon trials.
Yüksel Genç	Özgür Gündem	writer	2011-12-24	Arrested	detained at the L-Type women prison in Bakirköy, Istanbul
Zehra Doğan	Jinha	journalist	March 2017	Arrested/ released on the 24 - 02 - 2019	sentenced to 2 years 9 months and 22 days
Zehra Firdevsoğlu	Mukavemet			Arrested	
Zeynel Abidin Bulut	Xwebun	editor	2022-06-16	arrested	
Zeynep Kuray	Birgün	correspondent in Istanbul	2011-12-24	Released on 2013-04-26	detained at the L-Type women prison in Bakirköy, Istanbul
Ziya Çiçekçi	Özgür Gündem	owner	2011-12-24	Released on 2013-02-11	detained at the F-Type women prison in Kandira
Zuhal Tekiner	Dicle Haber Ajansı	owner	2011-12-24	Released on 2013-02-11	detained at the L-Type women prison in Bakirköy, Istanbul
Ali Can Uludağ	Deutsche Welle	journalist	19 February 2026	Arrested	Arrested in Ankara on charges of insulting the president and spreading misleading information in connection with a social media post.

== Grounds for prosecution ==
Kemalist and / or nationalist journalists were arrested on charges referring to the Ergenekon case and several left-wing and Kurdish journalists were arrested on charges of engaging in propaganda for the PKK listed as a terrorist organization. After the corruption operation in 17/25 December 2013 and in particular after coup attempt of 15 July, the apartments of journalists were raided and sent to prison. The journalists such as Mehmet Baransu, Ece Sevim Ozturk, who were investigating the ‘ Coup attempt’, were arrested. Media organizations such as Zaman newspaper, Cihan News Agency and Samanyolu TV, which were affiliated to the Fethullah Gülen group, were confiscated. Journalists working in these institutions were imprisoned. Life imprisonment was given to journalists such as Hidayet Karaca and Ahmet Altan. With the dozens of published decrees, newspapers, TV, radio, magazine, website was closed. The legal framework on organised crime and terrorism is imprecise and contains definitions which are open to abuse, leading to numerous indictments and convictions. Moreover, its interpretation by prosecutors and courts is uneven and is not in line with the European Convention on Human Rights or the case-law of the European Court of Human Rights, according to the European Commission. No clear distinction is made between incitement to violence and the expression of nonviolent ideas. The application of Articles 6 and 7 of the Anti-Terror Law in combination with Articles 220 and 314 of the Turkish Criminal Code leads to abuses; in short, writing an article or making a speech can still lead to a court case and a long prison sentence for membership or leadership of a terrorist organisation. Together with possible pressure on the press by state officials and the threat of possible firing of critical journalists, this situation can lead to a widespread self-censorship. Frequent website bans are a cause for serious concern and there is a need to revise the law on the internet.

Most journalists are in prison based on the following laws:

- The Anti-Terror Law of Turkey (also known as Terörle Mücadele Yasası, TMY), Articles 5 and 7 relating to articles of the Criminal Code on terrorist offences and organizations or assisting members of or making propaganda in connection with such organizations, as well as the lengthening of sentences;
- The Criminal Code of Turkey (also known as Türk Ceza Kanunu, TCK), Article 314 on establishing, commanding or becoming member of an armed organization with the aim of committing certain offences.

== Concerns ==
Concerns persisted over the rights of the defence, lengthy pre-trial detention and excessively long and catch-all indictments, leading to significantly enhanced public scrutiny of the legitimacy of these trials.

A report issued by the OSCE Representative on Freedom of the Media describes a number of concerns concerning the case of arrested journalists in Turkey:

- Courts often impose exceptionally long imprisonment sentences. The longest conviction is 166 years and the longest jail sentence sought for a journalist is 3,000 years.
- Many journalists face double life sentences if convicted, some without possibility for parole. Courts do not tend to grant pre-trial release of defendants.
- There is concern that arrests and long pre-trial detentions without conviction are used as a form of intimidation.
- Pre-trial detentions remain very long. In some cases journalists held in prison for up to three years are still awaiting trial. Some journalists have been imprisoned for more than five years while their trial is ongoing.
- Journalists often face several trials and are often convicted for several offences. There is one journalist who faces 150 court cases.
- Media outlets reporting about sensitive issues (including terrorism or anti-government activities) are often regarded by the authorities as the publishing organs of illegal organizations. Courts often consider reporting about such issues as equal to supporting them.
- Journalists are often imprisoned in F-tipi cezaevi (F-type high security prisons), where they have to serve their time with the most dangerous criminals. It is also not uncommon to punish journalists with solitary confinement for extended time periods.
- According to a report published by Amnesty International on 30 March 2020, Turkey government is said to be speeding up the process of preparing a draft law that intends to release approximately 100,000 prisoners amid growing concerns about the spread of COVID-19 in prisons. However, the law overlooks the journalists, political prisoners, and human rights defenders, who are said to remain jailed despite overcrowding and unsanitary living conditions already posing severe health threat.
- On 3 July 2020, four Amnesty International activists were convicted by the Turkish court for "assisting a terrorist organization". The human rights group denies all the charges and said that every allegation against its members has been "comprehensively exposed as a baseless slur."

== See also ==
- Censorship in Turkey
- Media freedom in Turkey
- Turkey's media purge after the failed July 2016 coup d'état
- International Freedom of Expression Exchange
- Human rights in Europe
- Human rights in Turkey

Lists:

- List of prosecuted Turkish writers
- List of arrested mayors in Turkey
- List of journalists killed in Turkey
