= Hawar News Agency =

Kurdish news agency

- Website type: News
- Available in: Arabic, English, Kurdish, Russian, Spanish, Turkish
- Area served: Syria
- Owner: Unknown
- Creator: Unknown
- Editor: Unknown
- Website: hawarnews.com
- Advertising: Yes
- Commercial: Unknown
- Registration: Optional
- Launched: August 2012; 14 years ago
- Current status: Active

Hawar News Agency (sometimes abbreviated ANHA) (Kurdish: Ajansa Nûçeyên a Hawar; Arabic: وكالة أنباء هاوار) is a news agency. The site started as an Arabic-only news service. Hawar News is linked to the Autonomous Administration of North and East Syria (AANES) and its armed forces the Syrian Democratic Forces (SDF).

== Ownership, identity and reliability ==
The ownership of the Hawar News Agency is unpublished. The website's domain name was first registered in August 2012. The site's About page says just "ANHA". Pro-Syrian opposition source Verify-sy claims Hawar News is affiliated with the Democratic Union Party (PYD).

== Attacks on staff ==
A number of its journalists have been killed in the Syrian civil war.

In 2022, Issam Abdullah and others, including Stêrk TV worker Mohammed Jarada, were allegedly targeted during Turkish airstrikes in northern Syria. Abdullah was killed and Jarada injured. The Committee to Protect Journalists called for Turkish authorities to swiftly investigate the events.

=== Attack on Cîhan Bilgin and Nazim Daştan ===
Cîhan Bilgin and Nazim Daştan were killed by a Turkish airstrike in December 2024 whilst working as freelancers for ANHA. The attack was condemned by the Dicle Firat Journalists’ Union and the Press Workers Union of Turkey. In later protests on the issue, a number of their members were detained by Turkish police. Turkish journalists and the leaders of the Istanbul Bar Association have subsequently faced criminal charges over their reporting of the airstrike. Consequently the Turkish Journalists Union has called on the government to abandon state policies hostile to journalists. The National Union of Journalists and International Federation of Journalists have both condemned the attack on Bilgin and Daştan and called for the Syrian transitional government to "carry out an independent investigation into these murders, as well as to identify and convict the perpetrators of these crimes". Colombian president Gustavo Petro also condemned Turkey's killing of the two journalists, demanding an end to the partitioning of Syria by Russia, Iran, Turkey, Israel and the United States, free elections in the country and international protection for the Syrian Kurds.

== Blocking and interference ==
The site has been repeatedly hacked in 2018, 2019, and 2022.

The Turkish telecommunications regulator blocked access to several news agencies in July 2015. The block followed the end of the Kurdish Turkish peace process and was described as a counter-terrorism action. Other Kurdish language or left-wing news sites based within and outside Turkey that were banned at the same time as Hawar News included Rudaw, Dicle News Agency, and Özgür Gündem.
