= Füsun Erdoğan =

Turkish journalist

- Born: 4 September 1960 (age 66)
- Citizenship: Netherlands, Turkey
- Known for: Broadcast journalism and imprisonment

Füsun Erdoğan (born 4 September 1960) is a radio journalist from Turkey that was sentenced to prison during Operation Gaye. She was accused of involvement in a banned organization, the Marxist–Leninist Communist Party (MKLP), under the Anti-Terror Law of Turkey. She was imprisoned in the Gezbe Women's Prison near Istanbul without completion of a trial for eight years. She claims that she was targeted due to her political opinions and her status as a journalist, stating that the "police was trying to intimidate members of the progressive, independent, democratic and alternative media." Others have also argued she was imprisoned for criticizing the government of Turkey. She was released on 8 May 2014 pending a final trial. However, Erdoğan, having dual Turkish-Dutch citizenship, moved to the Netherlands as an asylum seeker in 2014.

== Career ==
Erdoğan has been a journalist at least since she returned to Turkey in 1989. She self-described as "a dissident journalist". She founded the leftist radio station, Özgür Radyo (English: Free Radio), in 1995 and worked as the chief coordinator and director. Erdoğan was also a columnist at Bianet, a rights-focused website. In 1996, Erdoğan was detained and arrested, though she was released after the first hearing. Later, she was detained while working a press release on a massacre of prison inmates at Ulucanlar Prison in Ankara.

== Arrest and detention ==
Erdoğan was arrested on 8 September 2006 she was held in detention without trial for eight years. Officially she is accused of being in the central committee of MKLP. She and multiple human rights organizations believe she was targeted for political reasons and part of Turkey's wave of imprisoning journalists. Erdoğan attests that there is no evidence of any wrongdoing on her part. She was released 8 May 2014, though was still at risk of being re-imprisoned. She became an asylum seeker in the Netherlands in May 2014.

=== Arrest ===
Erdoğan was arrested in broad daylight on a work trip in İzmir on 8 September 2006 under Article 6 of the Anti-Terror Law of Turkey in İzmir. She was taken into a civilian car with undercover police. She was blindfolded and put in between the front and rear seats. Erdoğan was not told where they were going as they traveled several hours. They brought her to a two-story house and shoved her down, harming her knees and elbows when she refused to lie down with the other captured people. The police videotaped them and brought her to a car. They took her to a police station in Nazilli, and there she was made to sleep on a wooden bench with a handcuff on one arm. She was arrested by Beşiktaş High Criminal Court and then sent to Paşakapısı Prison in Üsküdar, Istanbul. She was later sent to Gebze Women's Prison, also near Istanbul.

After her arrest, others were investigated for having connections to either her or Özgür Radyo, such as her husband, nephew, and even cleaning staff at the radio.

=== Trials ===
On 12 September 2006 she was taken to court, where she refused to give a testimony without knowing for what she was detained. Her lawyer followed suit, as they were not informed either. Trial proceeding did not begin for her and those detained with her until 13 April 2007. Supporters of the detained who gathered on this day were teargassed by police during a clash. On 26 October 2007 it was announced at the Istanbul 10th Heavy Penal Court that she and the others she was detained with would continue to be held in pre-trial detention. This announcement was met with protests. The evidence against them was being kept from their lawyers, as they had been classified as secret. It was not until the summer of 2007 that the accusations were told to her lawyer. Her court appearance was scheduled for 26 October 2007, but since the police reports were incomplete, she could not defend herself until 2008.

Around 24 May 2011 her lawyers were given a document said to have been seized during the arrest, though they doubted its authenticity. Her next hearing was not scheduled until 13 October 2011. Still imprisoned, she wrote a letter 17 January 2013 detailing her experiences in prison as her health deteriorated. She explained that at her |hearings the prosecutor would extend her detention using a "cliché like 'based on type of crime and the state of evidence'". She was charged with a life sentence with an additional 789 years in early November 2013.

=== Evidence and accusations ===
She was detained because of accusations that she was a member of the MKLP, which had been declared a terrorist organization, along with Ibrahim Çiçek, Bayram Namaz, Sedat Senoglu, and Ziya Ulusoy. She is also accused of having carried out 296 activities for the group. The official indictment reads that she is accused of having:

… attempted to change the constitutional order by force; being an administrator and also the member of central committee; being responsible for the finances and legal activities of the illegal organization; therefore, being responsible as if a principle offender for all the crimes committed by the organization and its other members according to the Turkish Penal Code (TCK) 220/5 inches (13 cm) connection with TCK 314/3.

Erdoğan notes that she examined all the thousands of pages regarding her case searching for tangible evidence, but found "no evidence showing that I prepared these pages, or no wet signature or fingerprints found to be belonging to me." She also argued that the evidence was not found by abiding by protocol.

Turkey's EU Minister, Egemen Bağış, sent a letter to Swedish parliamentarians stating that Erdoğan was a "bomber" who "assaulted people". It claims she used guns to harm others and used explosives on buildings. She urged him to show evidence of these claims, and wrote "Whenever the problem of jailed journalists is brought to public attention, it is a well-known fact that officials especially PM Recep Tayyip Erdoğan are distorting information."

=== Human rights concerns and demands for release ===
Erdoğan became sick while she was imprisoned, though it took two years before the prison would allow her to go to the physician. Once she went to the doctor, she was diagnosed with thyroid cancer. She also suffered from many joint problems from staying on concrete. She was not allowed to wear boots in the winter, as they were reserved for soldiers only. Erdoğan was detained for eight years, which has been argued by human rights organization PEN International as contradicting the agreements of the European Convention on Human Rights. Her treatment, along with that of other jailed journalists in Turkey, has also been criticized by Reporters Without Borders and Organization for Security and Co-operation in Europe.

Her son, Aktaş Erdoğan, went on a hunger strike for three days, beginning at the Dutch Parliament, to protest his mother's imprisonment. He stated:

Hear my scream for justice. I am demanding for freedom for my mother. I am calling you to be in solidarity, I am calling you to be in solidarity. I am calling you to be a part of it. You might be the target tomorrow.

The World Association of Newspapers and News Publishers published the story of Erdoğan's imprisonment for the first day of their 30-day campaign leading to World Press Freedom Day. Other advocacy groups such as Turkish Journalists’ Union, the European Federation of Journalists, and the Committee to Protect Journalists also petitioned for her release. Due to the fact that she is not only a citizen of Turkey, but also the Netherlands, the Dutch Association of Journalists (NVJ) also advocated for her. The NVJ made 10,000 posters of Erdoğan along with text in Dutch reading "Füsün Erdoğan must be free" and "journalists are not terrorists". They also sent out messages to their magazine readership requesting them to share the posters on social media.

=== Release ===
Around 2014 a law was reduced the detention period from ten to five years. Even once this law was passed she was not released immediately. The judge residing her case rejected her release. She was finally released on 8 May 2014.

Her son believes the international pressure demanding her freedom helped her case. Immediately following her release she was sleeping notably less than before. She was initially not allowed by the Turkish government to go to Europe while awaiting her final trial.

=== Aftermath ===
After May 2014 she began living as an asylum seeker in the Netherlands, seeking refuge from re-imprisonment. She has also received help from the Danish union. Her case has been submitted to the Council of Europe's Platform for journalism and the safety of journalists. The Council of Europe held a hearing on Erdoğan from in mid-May 2014.
