= Doğa Baskan =

Turkish journalist

Doğa Baskan (born February 18, 2004) is a Turkish journalist who works as the Ankara correspondent for the left-wing daily newspaper Evrensel. She came to national prominence in 2026 after being arrested on charges of "publicly disseminating misleading information" following the accidental publication of a draft news report. She was released from custody after two days.

== Early life ==
She has been studying Latin Language and Literature at Ankara University since August 2022. In May 2025 she became an intern at Evrensel, turning into a full-time employee four months later.

In December 2025 she led an investigation into human trafficking rings that sell women from Afghanistan, Pakistan, and Syria into Turkey with the purpose of sexual exploitation. A video report narrated by Baskan went viral in Turkey, earning over 100 thousand views on X.

== Arrest ==
According to the Turkish media reports, in June 2026 Baskan prepared a draft of an article containing unverified claims and sent it to an editor at Evrensel. The editor mistakenly believed for it to be a finished article and subsequently published the text on the Evrensel website. The error was noted within minutes and the article was taken down.

On June 26, 2026, Baskan was summoned for questioning by the police regarding a potential violation of a highly controversial newly adopted article Article 217/A of the Turkish penal code, a provision criminalizing dissemination of misleading information. Following questioning, prosecutors charged Baskan with the violation of the abovementioned article.

In her statement, Baskan emphasized that she had been working as a journalist for approximately one year and had responded to the summons without delay. In spite of this, the prosecutor demanded her immediate arrest and the court subsequently ordered that she is to be held in pretrial custody as a flight risk.

Her detention has drawn international criticism, as the International Press Institute (IPI) and numerous other organisations called for her immediate release. In their statement, IPI condemned Baskan's detention over an accidentally published draft article and demanded her immediate release.

The defense also fully rejected the allegations made by the prosecution. According to Evrensel, attorney Senem Doğanoğlu argued that the draft neither deliberately targeted state institutions nor was capable of causing public panic during the brief period it remained online. Attorney İlke Işık likewise maintained that the legal requirements of Article 217/A had not been met. She emphasized that the text was deleted immediately after its accidental publication, did not spark any public debate, and was not widely disseminated. She also noted that Baskan has a permanent residence and is enrolled at a university, emphasizing that there is no risk of flight or interference with the investigation.

The appeal was successful and Baskan has been released from custody on June 27, 2026.

After her release, Baskan gave a speech to the media, referring to fellow journalists that were targeted by the state saying: "While I was inside, I thought a lot about İsmail Arı, Alican Uludağ, Metin Göktepe, and all the journalists. I remembered the struggling private sector teachers, the teachers who were victims of the interview process, the villagers fighting against the mining law, and the news we reported. I remembered the importance of our news for them, and I became even more committed to my profession. These pressures cannot intimidate us. We are publishing this newspaper to fight against these pressures."
