= Necmiye Alpay =

Turkish linguist

- Born: 23 November 1946 (age 79); Sındırgı, Turkey
- Education: Ankara University; Paris Nanterre University
- Writing career
- Genres: Translation, linguistic

Necmiye Alpay (born 23 November 1946 Sındırgı) is a Turkish linguist and translator.

She has devoted much of her efforts to improve the quality of written Turkish. She has written columns and articles in many newspapers and journals such as Radikal daily, translated many works into Turkish and also published books on the usage of language, literary criticism, and the peace process in Turkey.

== Early life and education ==
Alpay was born in Sındırgı, Turkey on 23 November 1946. After receiving her BSc degree from Ankara University and obtained a Ph.D. from the Paris Nanterre University in the field of international economics. She was lecturer at Ankara University, Faculty of Political Science for a short time until she was sentenced 3 years jail time following the military coup of 12 September 1980.

== Professional career ==
After her release, she started to work as a translator. She has translated numerous works into Turkish, including those of Edward Said, Rene Girard, Paul Ricoeur and Yan Marchand. Alpay worked as an editor for various periodicals, and has contributed regularly to several newspapers. She has devoted much of her efforts to improve the quality of written Turkish and published books on the usage of language, literary criticism, and the peace process in Turkey.

Being a member of the Editorial Consultancy Board of Özgür Gündem newspaper, Istanbul's Eighth Criminal Court of Peace ordered that she be detained on 31 August 2016. She was arrested on charges of being a ‘member of a terror organization’ and ‘disrupting the unity of the state’ under the Anti-Terror Law of Turkey. On the first day of her trial on 29 December 2016, 120 days after her arrest, she was released pending completion of her trial after pleading ‘not guilty’. She was acquitted of all charges on 14 February 2020. She was awarded honorary membership by the Swiss German Pen Center (DSZP).
