= Ulucanlar Prison Museum =

Prison museum in Ankara, Turkey

- Ulucanlar Cezaevi Müzesi
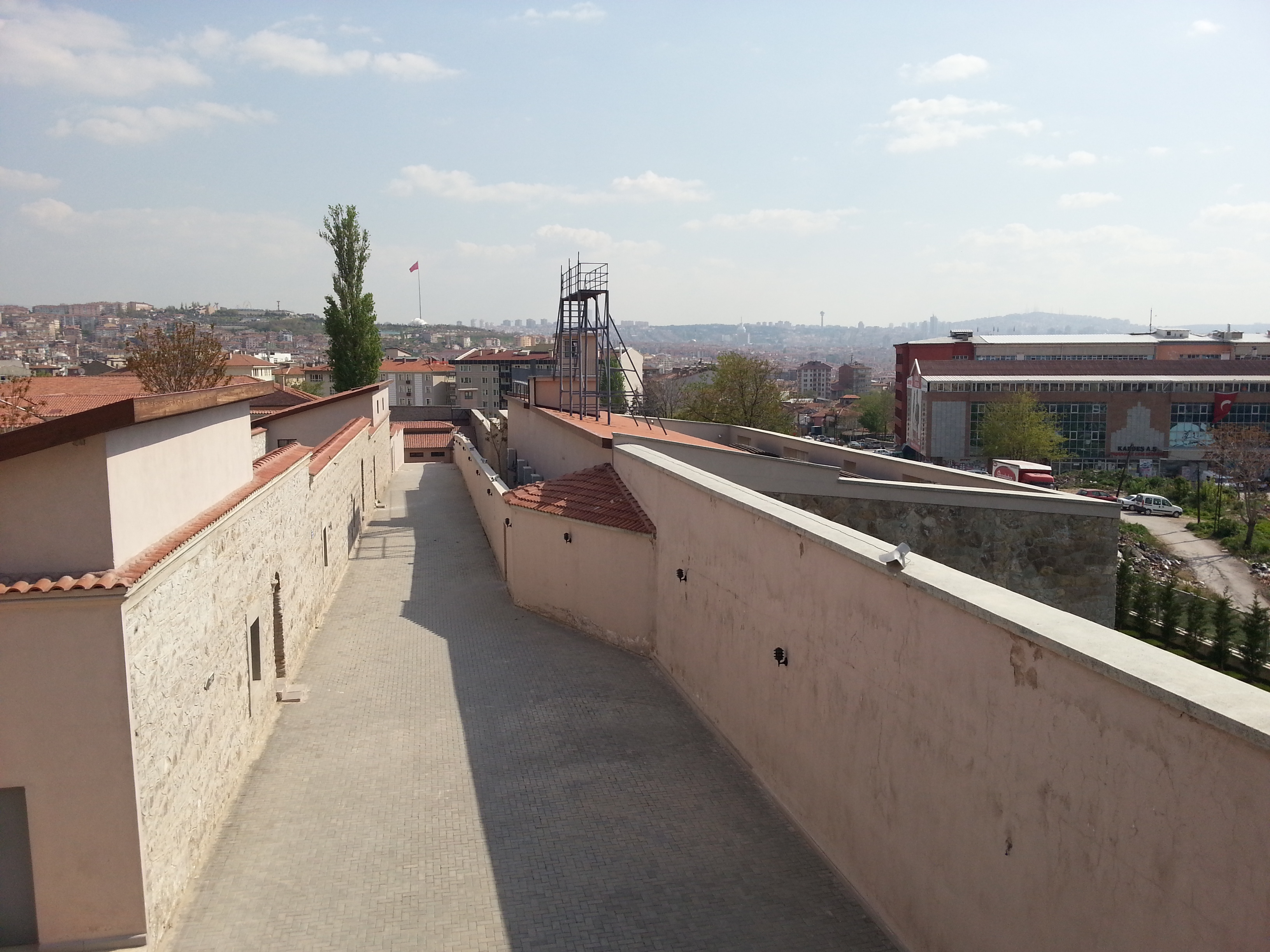

- Location of Ulucanlar Prison Museum in Turkey
- Established: July 2011
- Location: Ulucanlar, Altındağ, Ankara, Turkey
- Coordinates: 39.93848°N 32.87311°E
- Type: Prison
- Owner: Altındağ Municipality
- Website: Official website

The Ulucanlar Prison Museum (Turkish: Ulucanlar Cezaevi Müzesi) is a former state prison in Ankara, Turkey, that was converted into a prison museum following restoration by Altındağ Municipality. The museum was opened in 2011. It is the first museum of its kind in Turkey.

== Prison ==
=== History ===
Ulucanlar Prison was established in 1925 in the Ulucanlar neighborhood of Altındağ district in Ankara, which had recently become the new capital of the Turkish Republic.

The facility was built as a military depot in 1923, on an area of 34,000 m^{2} (370,000 sq ft). In its history, it was renamed several times and called "Cebeci Tevkifhanesi" (Cebeci Jail), "Cebeci Umumi Hapishanesi" (Cebeci Public Prison), "Cebeci Sivil Cezaevi" (Cebeci Civilian Prison), "Ankara Merkez Kapalı Cezaevi" (Ankara Central Closed Prison) and finally "Ulucanlar Merkez Kapalı Cezaevi" (Ulucanlar Central Closed Prison).

The correction and detention facilities in Turkey are officially categorized in three security level groups as closed (Turkish: kapalı), semi-open (Turkish: yarı açık) and open (Turkish: açık) prisons. Closed prisons are maximum security penitentiaries with external and internal control that hold violent prisoners and those judged most likely to escape. Semi-open prisons are medium security correctional institutions without external control but with only internal physical barriers that house prisoners bearing a moderate escape risk who also have a job. Open prisons are low security, work-oriented prison camps with no external control and internal physical barriers that hold inmates who are allowed to have limited interaction with the public. As of September 1999, the mixed-sex prison hosted 776 detainees and prisoners held in nineteen wards in the close and semi-open prison sections. The prison's healthcare facility had a capacity of forty beds.

Several prison riots broke out in July, September and December 1999. Ten inmates died and at least 28 were injured in the September riot while three men's wards and some of the women's wards were destroyed. At this time, an incomplete escape tunnel was discovered. Radio journalist Füsun Erdoğan was arrested while covering a press release regarding these events.

In 2006, the inmates of the closed prison section were transferred to a newly built prison in Sincan, Ankara. The evacuation of the semi-open prison section took place later.

=== Notable inmates ===
During its 81-year existence, Ulucanlar Prison held notable intellectuals with different political views including journalists, poets, and writers, as well as professional politicians alongside political activists and criminals. Among the notable people who were detained or imprisoned (not including executions) were:

- Hüseyin Cahit Yalçın (1875–1957), journalist, writer and politician
- Cevat Şakir Kabaağaçlı (1890–1973), novelist, short-story writer, essayist, ethnographer and travel writer
- Nazım Hikmet (1902–1963) poet, playwright, novelist and memoirist
- Necip Fazıl Kısakürek (1904–1983), poet, novelist, playwright, philosopher and activist
- Kemal Tahir (1910-1973), novelist and scholar
- Osman Bölükbaşı (1913–2002), politician, party leader
- Osman Yüksel Serdengeçti (1917–1983), journalist and politician
- Yaşar Kemal (1923-2015), writer and human rights activist
- Metin Toker (1924-2002), journalist and writer
- Bülent Ecevit (1925–2006), poet, writer, journalist, social-democratic politician and four-time Prime Minister of Turkey
- Cüneyt Arcayürek (1928-2015), journalist and writer
- Fakir Baykurt (1929–1999), educator, writer and labor union leader
- Yılmaz Güney (1937–1984), film director, scenarist, novelist and actor
- Muhsin Yazıcıoğlu (1954–2009), right-wing, nationalist-Islamist politician
- Hatip Dicle (1954- ), Kurdish politician
- Leyla Zana (1961- ), Kurdish politician and activist
- Sırrı Süreyya Önder (1962–2025), film director, actor, screenwriter, columnist and politician

The prison was also the site of torture and cruelty as well as many prison riots and executions.

=== Executions ===
Nineteen executions took place in the prison yard by hanging. Among the notable inmates sentenced to capital punishment and executed were:

- İskilipli Âtıf Hodja (1875–1926), As an Islamist scholar supported British invasion in local newspaper "Alemdar" that he was publishing
- Yusuf Aslan (1947–1972), Marxist–Leninist revolutionary and political activist (executed)
- Deniz Gezmiş (1947–1972), Marxist–Leninist revolutionary and political activist
- Hüseyin İnan (1949–1972), Marxist–Leninist revolutionary and armed political activist
- Necdet Adalı (1958–1980), Marxist–Leninist revolutionary and political activist
- Mustafa Pehlivanoğlu (1958–1980), right-wing, nationalist-Islamist activist
- Erdal Eren (1964–1980), Marxist–Leninist revolutionary and political activist (executed)

== Museum ==
=== Restoration ===
The prison facility was officially declared a building of historic interest which could not, for that reason, be demolished, extended, or altered without special permission. Altındağ Municipality restored the prison building to its original form and opened it to the public as a museum in July 2011.

Long lasting restoration work that cost around ₺10 million (US$6.7 million as of 2010) was carried out though no archive was available due to two fires that occurred in the prison building in the past. Documents relating to the 81-year history of the prison were limited to photographs from 1997 and plans from the restoration project carried out in 2000. Exhibition materials and other information needed to make up the museum were collected from the relatives of the inmates after due persuasion. In the museum, there is a library containing books written by the prisoners, books covering the political lifetime of Turkey, as well as court protocols. Original graffiti on the inside walls and oil paintings were carefully kept. All the exhibited items are original. The museum also has meeting and conference halls, and has served as a place for cultural activities as well as a film set.

=== Exhibits ===
In the entrance of the museum, the Ninth and Tenth Ward are situated, which were metaphorically called "Hilton Ward" because of their smaller size in relation to the other prison wards and, therefore, relative comfort. Prominent politicians like Bülent Ecevit and Osman Bölükbaşı were interned in these wards, where their biographies are shown on the bunk beds.

Isolation cells were reserved for high-profile criminals. Yelling of wardens and horrible screams of tortured prisoners in the isolation cells sound out of the loudspeakers while walking in the hallways. Clanging historic türkü (folk songs) and poems are heard reminding visitors of the era of tortures and executions.

In the isolation cells and the Fourth Ward, there are twenty-two wax sculptures depicting inmates in different positions in their daily prison life. On the bunk beds of the Fifth Ward, biographies of notable inmates are attached. The Sixth Ward incorporates, in addition to more biographies, personal belongings of notable inmates such as watches, cigarettes, walking sticks, dishes, glasses, teapot and such other personal articles.

In the grand yard, the prisoners' hamam (bathhouse) is situated. Photographs of notable inmates hang on the branches of a wish tree in the yard. There is also an original gallows in the yard with the original hangman's knot hanging on it. Nineteen executions took place there.

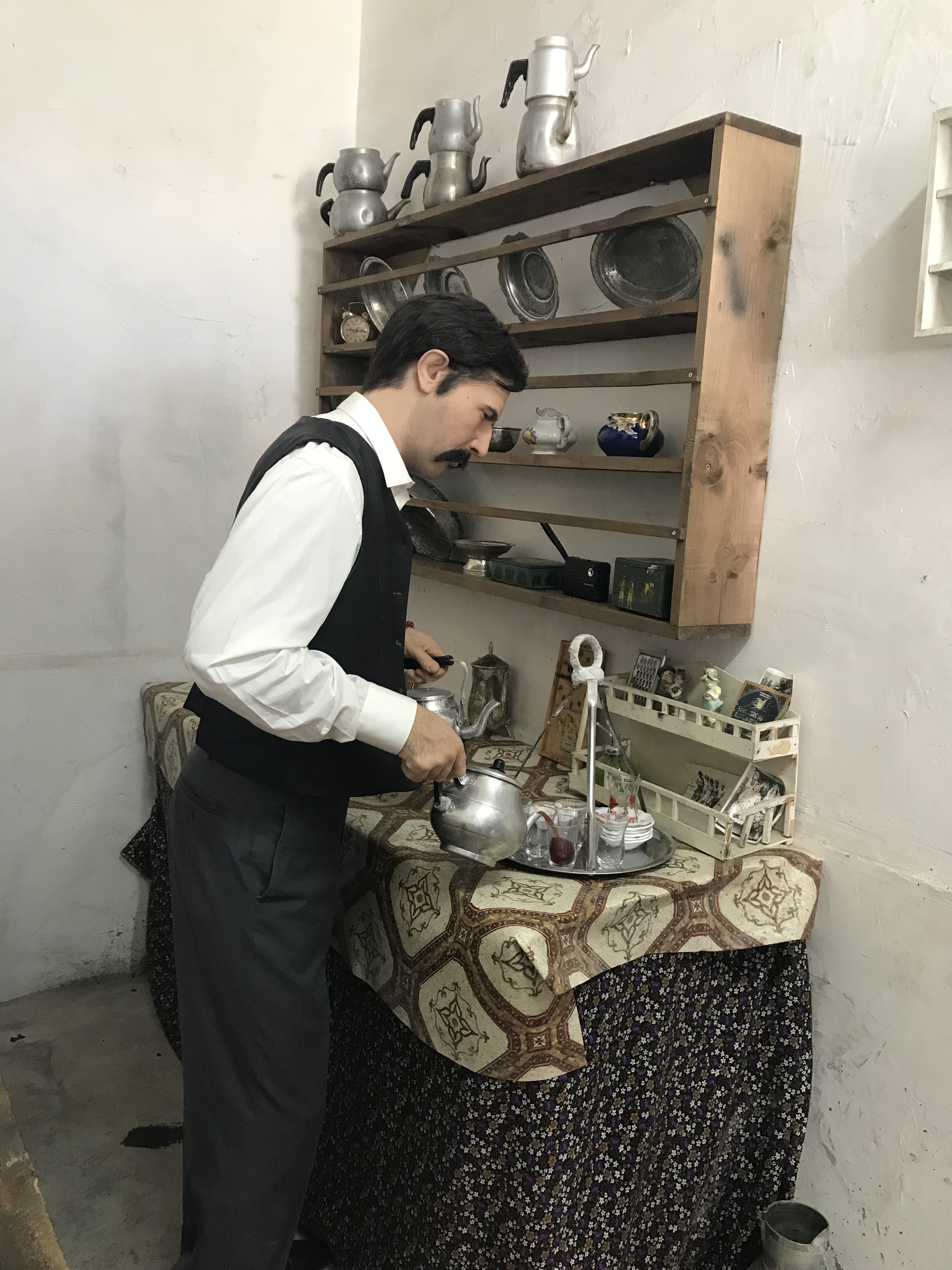
Wax sculpture in Ulucanlar

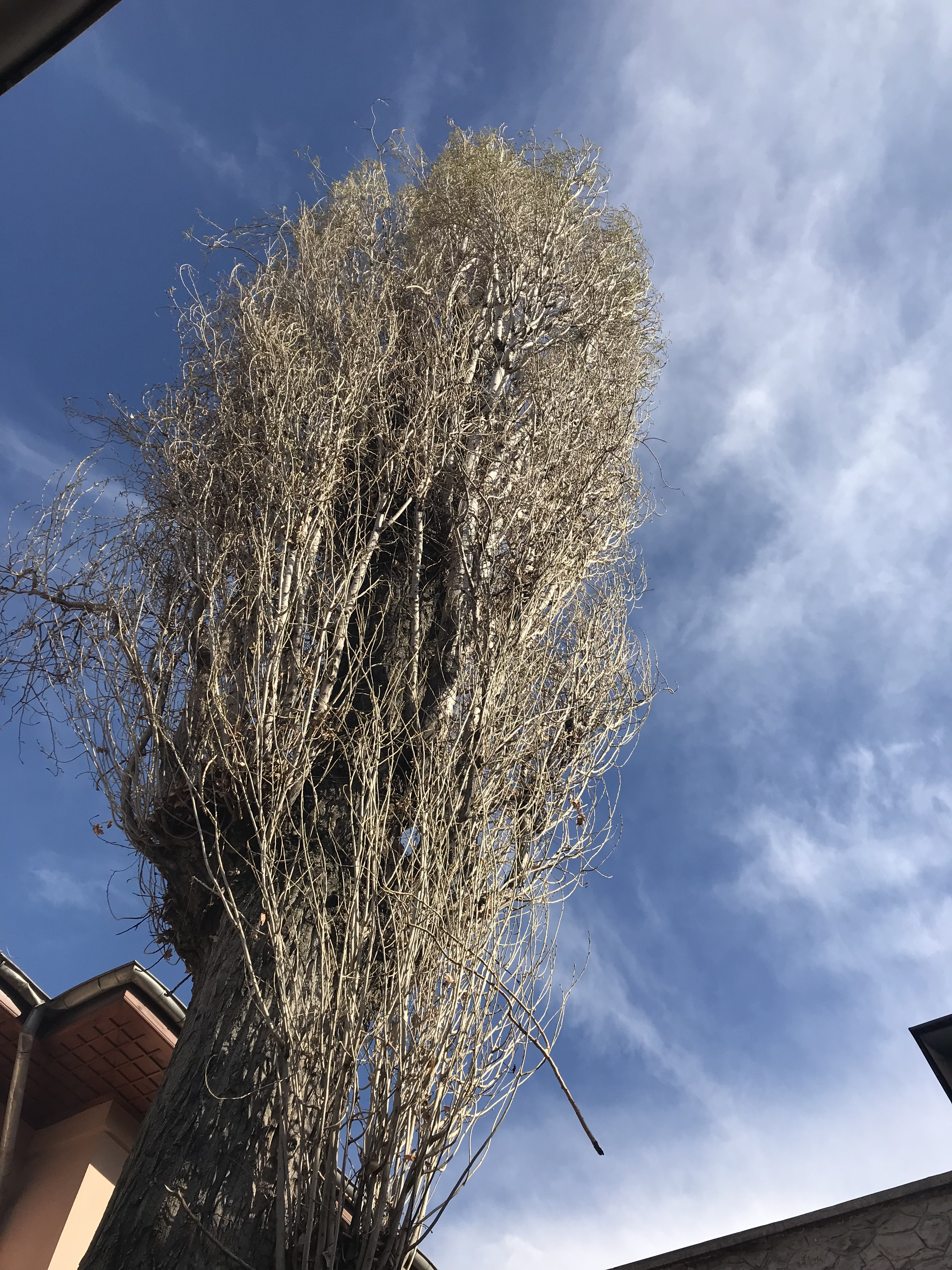
Yard of Ulucanlar

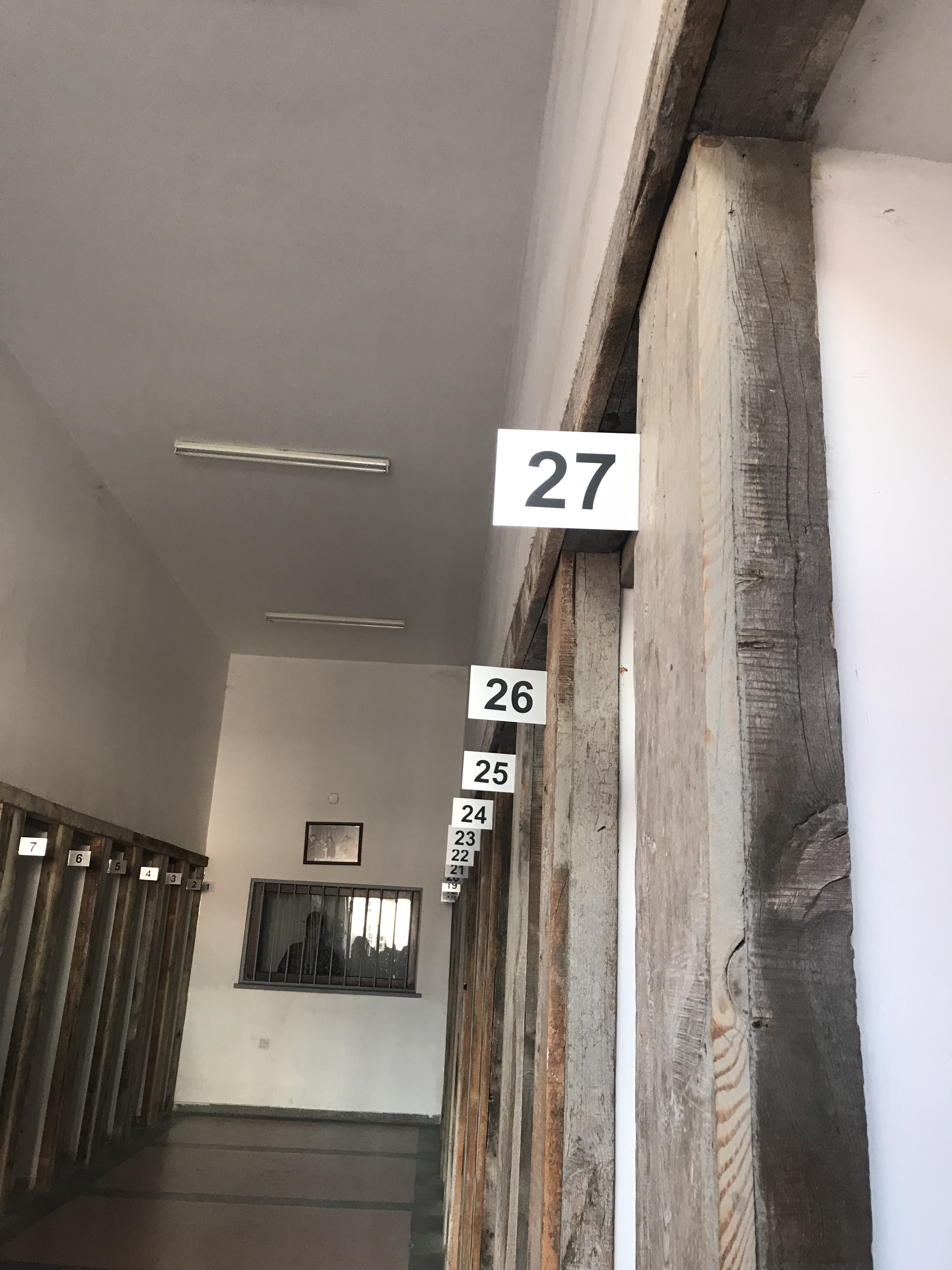
Ulucanlar Exhibition

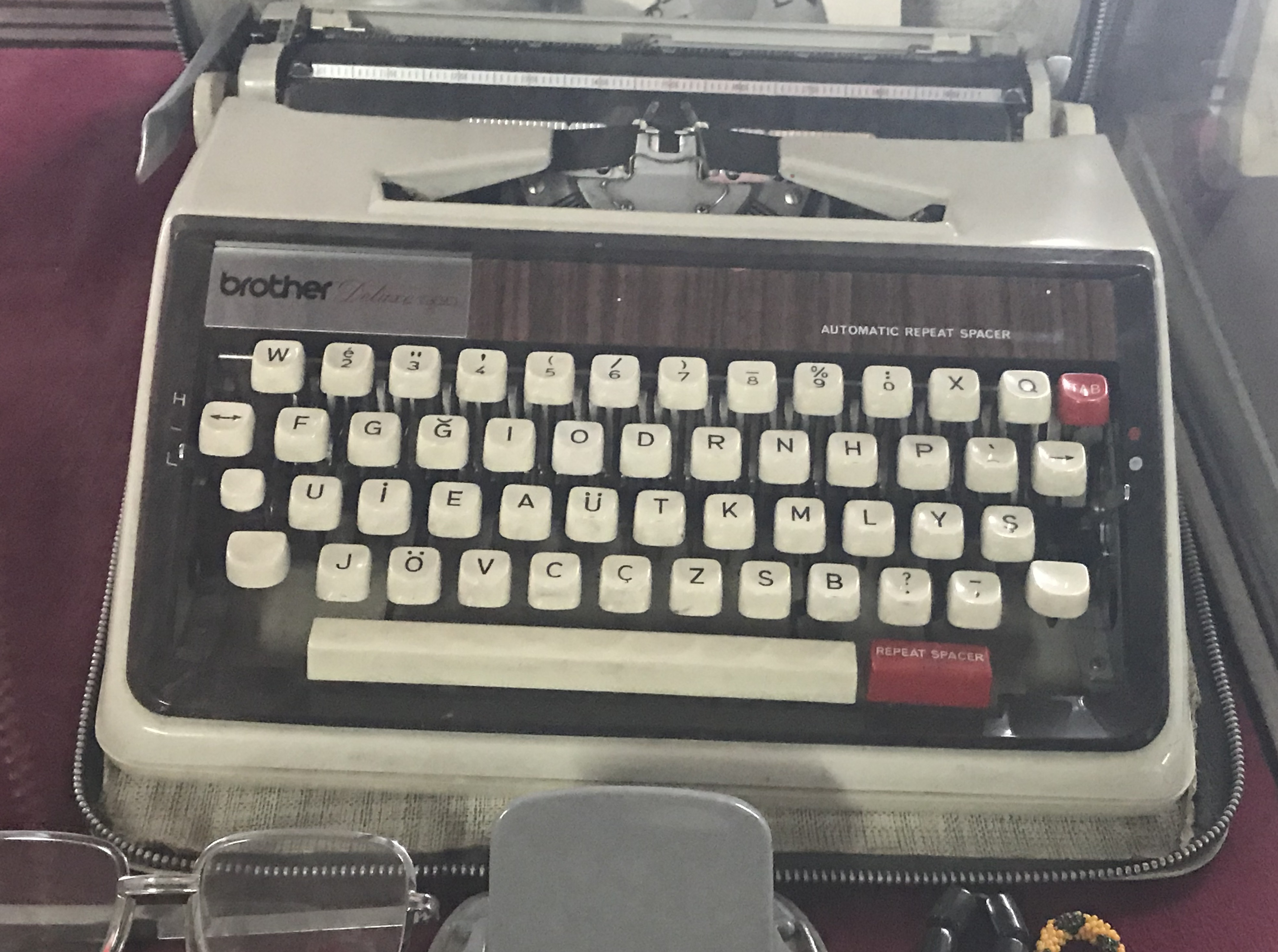
Printing Press Ulucanlar

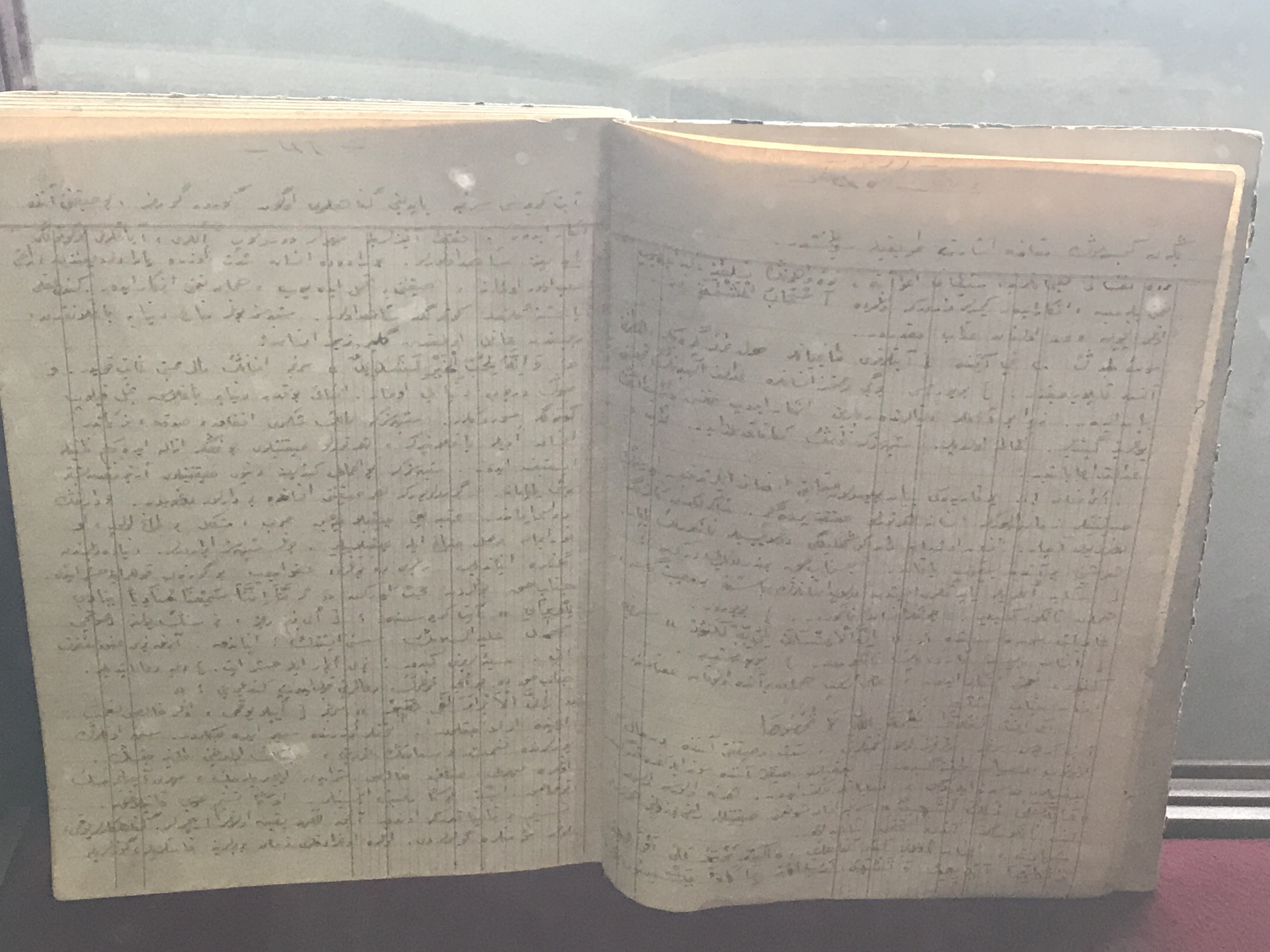
Book Ulucanlar

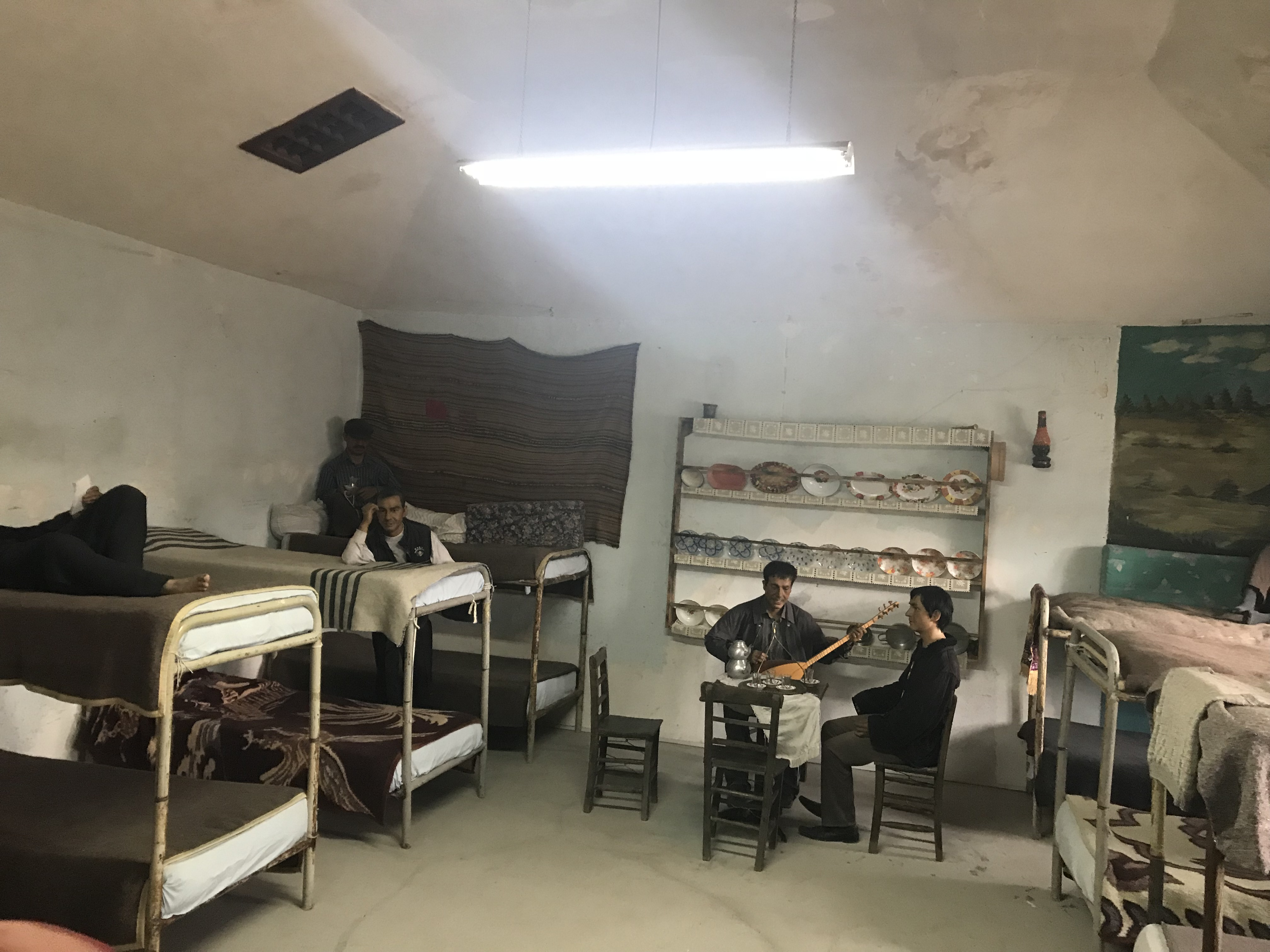
Ward of Ulucanlar

Upon request, a special segregation unit was constructed over the existing isolation cells. For an additional payment, visitors can be locked in this unit for fifteen minutes or one hour to better perceive the prison conditions. To experience this, they enter the cell escorted by a warden after turning over their watch and cellphone, and getting handcuffed. These visitors are not permitted to leave the cell before their time is up.

== In popular culture ==
- Yılmaz Güney was inspired from Ulucanlar Prison in his 1983 film Duvar.
- The 1989 film Uçurtmayı Vurmasınlar, starring Nur Sürer as a female political prisoner, was shot in the prison.
