= Ertuğrul Mavioğlu =

Turkish journalist

- Known for: Documentary filming and journalism

Ertuğrul Mavioğlu is a Turkish journalist. He worked at a number of newspapers and television networks for 30 years. From 1980 to 1991, he spent eight years imprisoned for political reasons. He received two awards from the Progressive Journalists Association. He is also a documentary filmmaker and co-created the film Bakur (Turkish for "North") in 2015 together with Çayan Demirel. The film was used as evidence to prosecute him under the Anti-Terror Law of Turkey. He has stated that “Any propaganda one can find in this film would be propaganda for peace.”
