= Çayan Demirel =

Kurdish film director (born 1977)

Çayan Demirel (born 1977, Istanbul) is a Kurdish film director best known for his documentaries about the Kurdish-Turkish conflict. His film Prison Number 5 (1980-1984) on the Diyarbakir prison won several awards and he was prosecuted for the documentary Bakur, which focuses on the Kurdistan Workers' Party (PKK).

== Early life and education ==
Demirel was born in Istanbul, Turkey, in 1977 to parents hailing from the Dersim region. After he had studied economics, his interest in movies appeared from 2000 onwards. He became the production director for Özcan Alper in the documentary Time travel with a scientist (Turkish:Bir Bilim Adamyla Zaman Aleminde Yolculuk) on the life of Yılmaz Öner.

== Professional career ==
In 2006, the documentary 38, focusing on the Kurdish Dersim rebellion against Turkey, was released. The film was screened at film festivals, but when it was announced on the program of the 7th Munzur Film Festival in Tunceli, the Turkish authorities prevented its screening, the reason given being that the film lacked official certification. In October 2007, the Turkish Directorate General of Copyrights and Cinema refused to grant 38 official certification. Following this, Demirel founded the production company Surela Films with Ayşe Çetinbaş. In 2009, the documentary Prison Number 5 (1980–1984) on the Diyarbakir prison was released, a movie that was shown in several film festivals, winning the Golden Orange at the Film Festival in Antalya the same year.

The documentary Bakur (Kurdish:North) he directed for Ertugrul Mavioglu during the years 2013-2014, when the peace process between the PKK and Turkey was taking place. The film focuses on the lives and motivations of members of the PKK to rebel against the Turkish Government and presents the right for self-determination as a n universal right. It was inspired by the idea to document the withdrawal of the PKK from Turkey after the announcement of the peace process but after they began to film, the circumstances changed and the withdrawal was stopped. It was the first time a professional camera was able to film in the camps of the PKK in Turkey and Iraq. The movie was screened in International Film Festivals of Germany, Mexico or Canada, winning the award for best documentary at Signes de Nuit in Berlin and the Mediterranean Film Festival. As it was announced at the Istanbul Film Festival 2015, the Turkish authorities prohibited its screening four hours prior to its screening. Later screenings were at the Film Festival in Batman and the censored films category of the 8th Documentary Film days in Istanbul.

=== Prosecution ===
Following the screening in Batman, both Çayan Demirel and Ertuğrul Mavioğlu were investigated for terror propaganda based on the Anti-Terror Law of Turkey and were sentenced to three years imprisonment with a raise by half for having committed the crime in public on the 18 July 2019. The two appealed the verdict and in February 2022 the sentences were annulled and a new trial was to be held in Batman. During the first time of his trial, Demirel was in intensive care due to a heart issue.

== Personal life ==
Demiral is married to Ayşe Çetinbaş, whom he got to know while directing the documentary 38. Bakur was his last movie to date, as he became severely ill and since September 2020 was granted a pension for disability, for which the Turkish Government appealed. A short movie on him called Our friend Cayan was released in 2020.
