= Nedim Türfent =

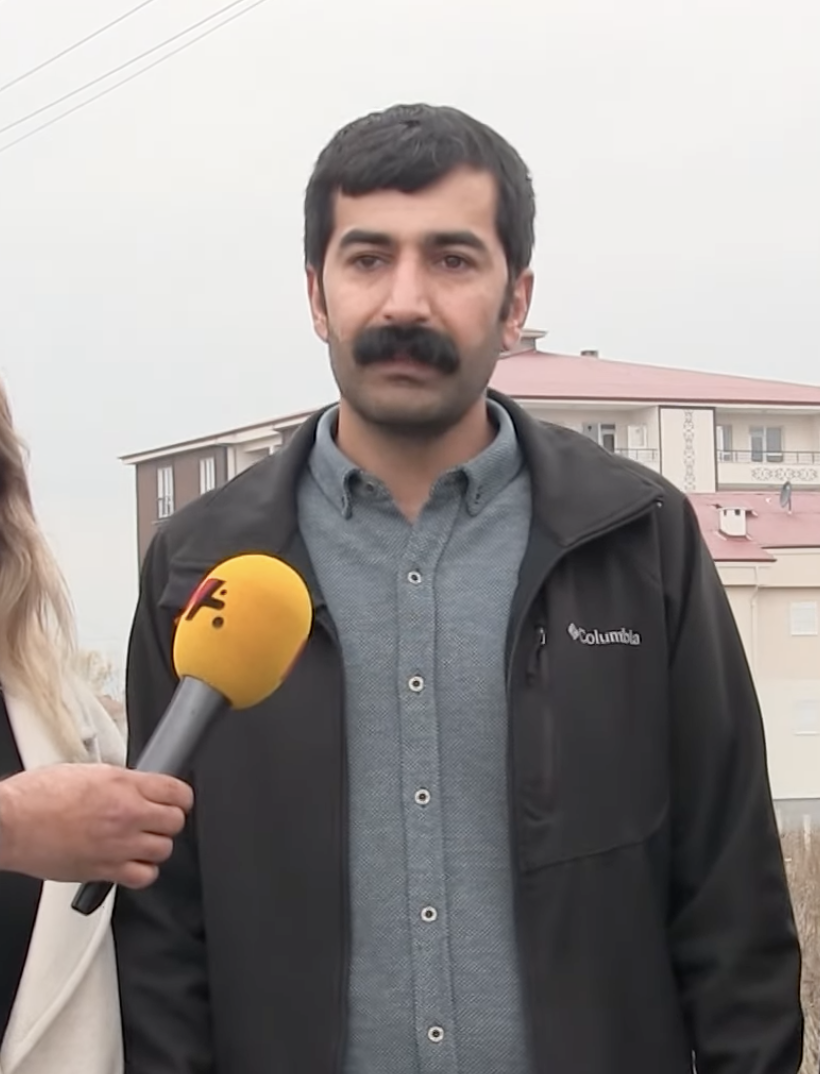
- Born: Yüksekova, Turkey
- Occupations: Journalist, poet
- Known for: Journalist for Dicle News Agency, imprisoned journalist in Turkey.

Nedim Türfent is a Kurdish journalist from Turkey who worked as a correspondent for Dicle News Agency (DIHA) in the South East of Turkey. He was arrested on May 12, 2016, and charged with "membership in a terrorist organisation" under the Anti-Terror Law of Turkey. He remains in prison.

Türfent is from Yüksekova in the far East of Turkey. He was jailed after the shuttering of Dicle News Agency in 2016, was detained without charge for the first 13 months of his imprisonment. Following this, he was charged with being a member of the banned Kurdish militia, the Kurdistan Workers' Party (PKK). Witnesses who gave evidence against Türfent later stated that they had been deposed under torture, and the prosecution also relied on anonymous testimony. Türfent claimed at his trial that he was being persecuted as a result of his reporting, in particular a story called "You will see the power of Turks", which criticised the Turkish police and military authorities. He was sentenced to eight years and nine months in prison. On 10 October 2019, Türfent's sentence was upheld by Turkey's Court of Cassation.

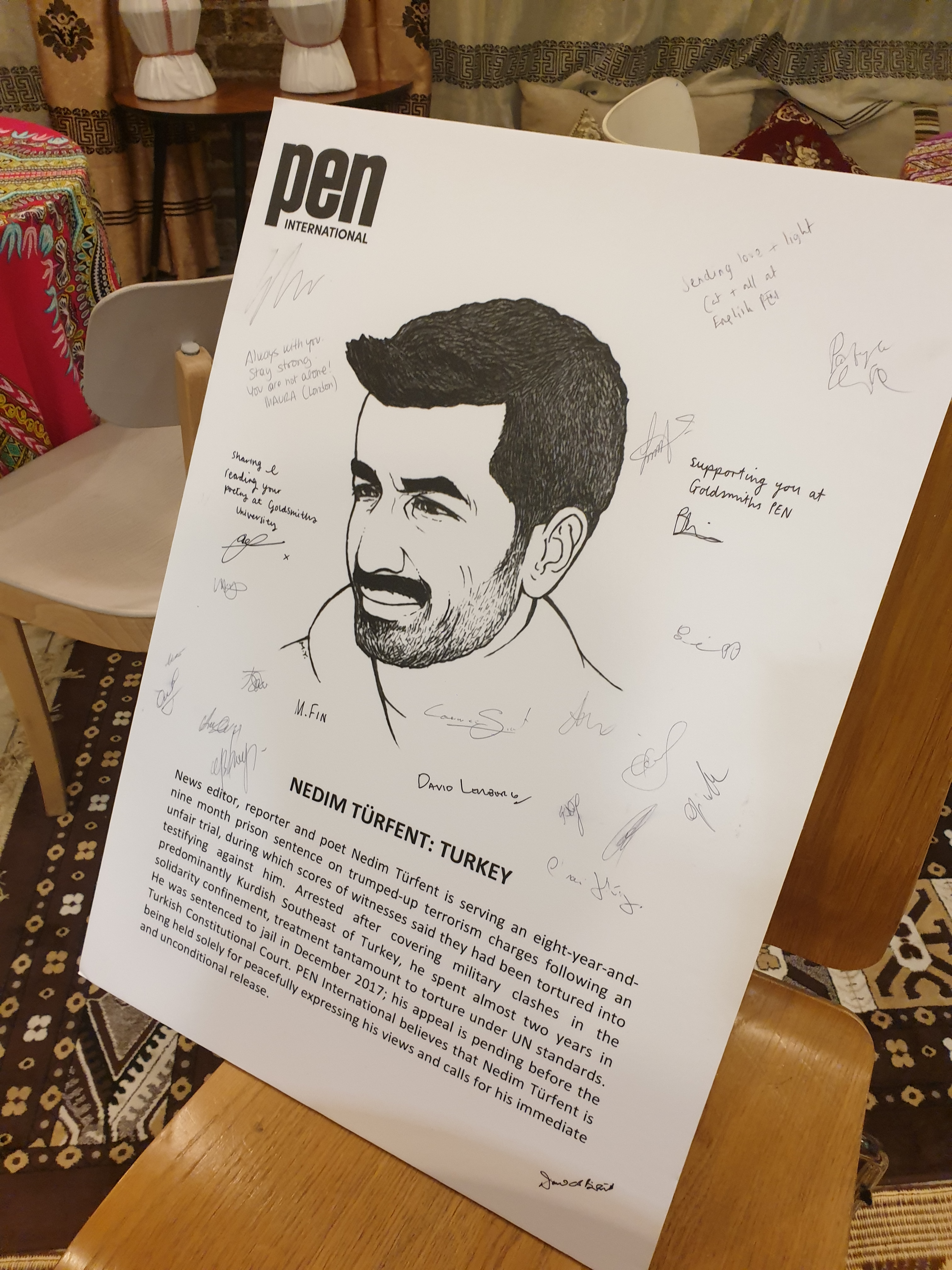
Nedim Türfent poster at Free Word Centre

Türfent is also a poet, and his case has been taken up by organisations like PEN International and the Irish arm of The Freedom to Write Campaign. On the 1000th day of his arrest, International Press Institute (IPI), PEN International and Media and Law Studies Association (MLSA) wrote a letter to Türfent, saying, "We write to you today to tell you that you are not alone. We are with you and united our voices to demand your release." He was released in November 2022.
