= Mezopotamya Agency =

Turkish news agency

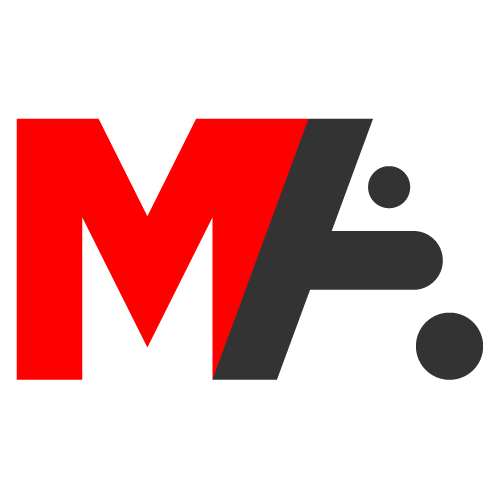
- Founded: 20 September 2017; 9 years ago
- Headquarters: Beyoğlu, Istanbul, Turkey
- Area served: Worldwide
- Website: mezopotamyaajansi.net

Mezopotamya Agency (Turkish: Mezopotamya Ajansı/ MA) is a Kurdish news agency based in Beyoğlu, Istanbul. It is described as pro-Kurdish by the Platform to promote the protection of journalism and safety of journalists of the Council of Europe (COE) and left-wing by the International Observatory of Human Rights. It publishes articles in Kurdish, Turkish, and English. Mezopotamya Ajansı's www.mezopotamyaajansi35.com website, which had been blocked 34 times before, was also blocked on the grounds of 'protection of national security and public order' by Erzurum 1st Criminal Judgeship of Peace on March 12.

== History ==
MA was established on 20 September 2017 following a purge of many pro-Kurdish newspapers and news agencies. It publishes articles critical on the Turkish Government and the access to the website operated by Mezopotamya Agency has been blocked for more than 20 times by the Turkish authorities upon which each time Mezopotamya released their reports over a new domain. The agency often publishes articles from the predominantly Kurdish provinces of Turkey.

MA's staff is often targeted by the Turkish authorities, their offices raided, their equipment confiscated and the journalists prohibited from entering public institutions. Several of its reporters have been arrested or been sentenced to prison terms. Journalists Sadiye Eser and Sadık Topaloğlu were arrested in December 2019 accused of being a member of a terrorist organization and released pending trial a few months later in March 2020. On 6 October 2020, two journalists of the news agency were imprisoned after they reported that two peasants were thrown out of a Turkish military helicopter in Van Province. They were released in April 2021.

Mehmet Aslan, who covered the situation of the Kurdish prisoners was imprisoned in January 2021, and released pending trial with an international travel ban in May 2021. Sixteen journalists who were detained in Diyarbakır on 8 June 2022 and charged with "illegal organization membership" were arrested on 16 June 2022. Mezopotamya Agency editors Ömer Çelik and Aziz Oruç were among the arrested journalists. The journalists were released 13 months later at the first hearing held at Diyarbakır 4th Assize Court.

On 25 April 2023, Mezopotamya Agency editor Abdurrahman Gök and the agency's reporter M. Şah Oruç were detained. On 27 April 2023, they were arrested on charges of "being a member of an illegal organization" and "making propaganda for an illegal organization" based on their news reports and sent to Diyarbakır High Security Prison No. 1. 6 months later, M. Şah Oruç was released.

Abdurrahman Gök, who had been repeatedly subjected to judicial pressure due to the photographs of Kemal Kurkut and was once again charged for his news reports, was released on 5 December 2023 at the second hearing of the case held at Diyarbakır 5th High Criminal Court with a ban on leaving the country. Mezopotamya Agency editors Dicle Müftüoğlu and Sedat Yılmaz were detained in Diyarbakır on April 29, 2023, taken to Ankara and arrested on May 3, 2023. Sedat Yılmaz was released at the hearing held on December 14, 2023. He was acquitted at the second hearing held at Diyarbakır 4th High Criminal Court on February 29, 2024. Journalist Dicle Müftüoğlu was released after 306 days of detention at the 3rd hearing of the case held at Diyarbakır 5th Assize Court with a ban on leaving the country.

Mezopotamya Agency's Izmir office was raided by the police on 13 February 2024 and agency reporters Semra Turan Delal Akyüz and Tolga Güney were detained. On 16 February 2024, Delal Akyüz and Tolga Güney were released on house arrest and Semra Turan was released on judicial control conditions.

On October 25, 2022, 11 Mezopotamya Agency (MA) and JINNEWS reporters were detained in house raids in Ankara, Istanbul, Van, Diyarbakır, Urfa, Mersin and Mardin as part of an investigation by Ankara Chief Public Prosecutor's Office. Mezopotamya Agency (MA) Managing Editor Diren Yurtsever, MA reporters Deniz Nazlım, Selman Güzelyüz, Zemo Ağgöz, Berivan Altan, Hakan Yalçın, Emrullah Acar and Ceylan Şahinli, and JINNEWS reporters Habibe Eren and Öznur Değer were detained during the raids. Mehmet Günhan, formerly an intern reporter at MA's Ankara bureau, was also detained in a house raid in Manisa. On October 29, 2022, MA Managing Editor Diren Yurtsever, MA reporters Berivan Altan, Deniz Nazlım, Selman Güzelyüz, Hakan Yalçın, Ceylan Şahinli, Emrullah Acar and JINNEWS reporters Habibe Eren and Öznur Değer were taken to court and arrested for "illegal organization membership".

On May 16, 2023, 9 journalists were released at the first hearing held at Ankara 4th High Criminal Court. The third hearing of the lawsuit filed against journalist Abdurrahman Gök for "being a member of an illegal organization" and "making illegal organization propaganda" due to his news reports, which resulted in his 225-day imprisonment, started at Diyarbakır 5th Assize Court. The court decided to give time to the lawyers to prepare their defense against the secret witness statements and to continue Gök's ban on leaving the country. The hearing was adjourned to June 11, 2024.
