= Abdurrahman Gök =

Turkish journalist (born 1980)

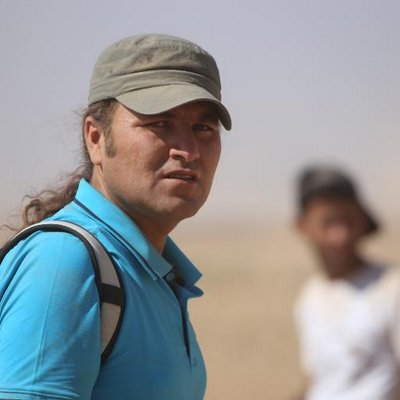
Abdurrahman Gök in 2014

Abdurrahman Gök (born 17 April 1980) is a Kurdish journalist and the author of the photographs which documented the murder of Kemal Kurkut.

== Education ==
Gök was born on 17 April 1980, Kuyubaşı, Batman. He attended primary school in Kuyubaşı and received his secondary education in Batman. After he graduated from high school in 1997, he studied Arabic. Later he studied journalism at the Ege University in İzmir, and was employed by the Dicle News Agency in 2004.

Until 2014, he worked as a reporter, regional news chief, editor and news director at Dicle News Agency (DİHA). Between 2014 and 2015, he worked as news director at Azadiya Welat, the only Kurdish daily newspaper published in Turkey. Afterwards, he worked as the Editor-in-Chief of Jiyan TV, which broadcasts in Kurmancî and Kirmancki dialects of Kurdish via Türksat satellite for about 20 months. In 2017, he worked as an editor at the news agency dihaber. When dihaber was shut down by the government of the time, he started working as news director at the Mezopotamya Agency (MA). After about 20 months as news director, he continues his journalism as an editor at the same agency. He has been working as a conflict area reporter for the last 10 years.

== Professional career ==
He was prosecuted for his journalistic activities several times during his career. In 2009, while working for Dicle New Agency, he was arrested on the 24 March, after he reported on the Newroz festivities in Siirt. At the beginning he was accused of throwing stones at the police, then for being involved in the festivities and after all this was not viewed as credible, he was accused of being involved with the network of Roj TV a Kurdish television channel formerly based in Denmark, and was viewed as a being close to the Kurdistan Workers' Party (PKK) by the Turkish authorities. PKK is a designated as a terrorist organization by international authorities. He was released in November 2009, pending trial. Between 2011 and 2012 he directed three documentaries. On 3 August 2014, ISIS attacked Shengal in the Federated Kurdistan Region, where the Yazidi people live, and followed the experiences of the Yazidis who took refuge in Mount Shengal after this attack and then walked for hours to North East Syria. They reported the developments to news agencies and televisions. On 15 September 2014, after following the ISIS attack on the Kurdish city of Kobanê in Northeastern Syria for a while from the border of Suruç district of Urfa, he went to Kobanê city centre and followed the clashes between ISIS and Kurdish fighters (YPG/YPJ) on behalf of Dicle News Agency (DİHA) and Azadiya Welat Newspaper. The news he reported and the photographs and images he took were also published by international media. In addition to his news reports, his interview with Nefel, a young fighter, and Apê Nemir, an elderly fighter, who fought in the same position, made an impression. In late 2016, war correspondent and journalist Abdurrahman Gök travelled to North East Syria and followed the QSD operation against Raqqa, the capital of ISIS, until early March 2017.

He also covered the Newroz festivities at Diyarbakir in 2017, where he took a photograph of the moment when Kemal Kurkut was shot. He had to deliver a testimony at the prosecutors office and give the photographs of the killing of Kemal Kurkut to the prosecutor.

=== Legal prosecution since 2018 ===
1. In October 2018, he was detained for three days and charged with being a member of a terrorist organization and the prosecution aims for a sentence between 7 and 20 years imprisonment. The indictment is based on the testimony of secret witness known as "Patience", a phone call with an unknown person over news of the Hawar News Agency, a speech he held at the Journalists day and further some text messages of an unknown person which asked him about photographs he took of refugees. The trial of Abdurrahman Gök began on the 23 February 2021 in Diyarbakır, where his ban to travel abroad was lifted and a private hearing for the secret witness was scheduled before the public hearings would begin again on the 3 June The secret witness testified from Gaziantep and alleged that both Kemal Kurkut and Abdurrahman Gök were members of the PKK, and the images of Kurkut's murder were taken of the PKKs orders. Gök said, "There is an attempt to take revenge on me 'on behalf of the state' for exposing the live bomb lie." In June 2022, he was sentenced to 1 and six months imprisonment for having made propaganda for a terrorist organization. In late April 2023, Gök was arrested. On December 5, 2023, in the second hearing held at Diyarbakır 5th High Criminal Court, he was released pending trial with a travel ban. The third hearing of the lawsuit filed against journalist Abdurrahman Gök for "being a member of an illegal organization" and "making illegal organization propaganda" due to his news reports, which resulted in his 225-day imprisonment, 12 March started at Diyarbakır 5th Assize Court. The court decided to give time to the lawyers to prepare their defense against the secret witness statements and to continue Gök's ban on leaving the country. The hearing was adjourned to June 11, 2024 The fourth hearing of the lawsuit filed against Mezopotamya Agency (MA) editor Abdurrahman Gök due to “membership of an illegal organization” and “making propaganda for an illegal organization” was held at Diyarbakır 5th Assize Court. The court decided to hear the secret witness in the next hearing and to continue the travel ban on Gök. The next hearing will be held on October 22. The 6th hearing of the case in which Mezopotamya Agency (MA) editor Abdurrahman Gök is being tried for "being a member of an organization" and "making propaganda for an organization" based on his professional activities and the statements of informant Ümit Akbıyık was held at the Diyarbakır 5th High Criminal Court. In his defense during the hearing, Gök stated that he was being tried due to his professional activities. He stated that he was engaged in conflict journalism and that the judicial control measure regarding the ban on traveling abroad, which was imposed on him because he was a journalist focusing on developments abroad, prevented him from practicing his profession, and requested that the ban be lifted. The court ruled that the results of another investigation conducted by the Diyarbakır Republic Prosecutor's Office regarding Gök be awaited and that the judicial control measure regarding the ban on traveling abroad be continued. The court adjourned the hearing to April 22, 2025. In the case where Gök was tried on September 11th on charges of "membership in a terrorist organization" and "propaganda for a terrorist organization", the court rejected requests to lift the nearly two-year international travel ban. The next hearing is scheduled for November 25, 2025. A new indictment was prepared against Gök, this time with a request to merge the cases on the charge of "membership in a terrorist organization". The indictment prepared by the Diyarbakır Chief Public Prosecutor's Office was based on the testimony of the secret witness named 'K8Ç4B3L1T5', In his statement included in the indictment, the secret witness said of Gök, “...he is the person who photographed the moment when Kemal Kurkut was neutralized by the security forces during the Nevruz celebrations held in Diyarbakır province in 2017.”

== Award ==
- For his photographs of Kemal Kurkut, he received a Metin Göktepe Journalism Award in 2017.
- For his photographs of Kemal Kurkut, he received the Musa Anter and Özgür Basın Şehitleri Journalism Award in 2017.
- He also received the Yılmaz Güney Honor Award in the category documentary at the 2nd Culture and Art Festival in 2012.
- First prize in Kurdish news in Successful Journalists of the Year Competition of the Southeastern Journalists Association in 2014
- A journalist who traveled to Iran to cover the social demonstrations that broke out in Iran following the killing of Mahsa Jîna Amini by the Iranian regime, and for his series of news reports in Iran, was selected as the winner in the Turkish news category of the 2023 Musa Anter and Press Martyrs Journalism Awards Contest. The jury members made the following assessment for Abdurrahman Gök's article: "The uprising in Iran, where women, youth and Persian, Kurdish, Baluch and Arab peoples participated in the uprising, was affecting people in many countries. The uprising that started after Mahsa Jina Emini was murdered in custody because her hair was visible, all eyes were on Iran. Abdurrahman Gök's article-series was an excellent piece of journalism to understand the qualitative and quantitative aspects of the uprising in Iran, the dimensions and characteristics of the political and social crisis, which attracted the close attention of the global public opinion. Even going to Iran in a tense environment is a feat of courage, but the fact that he has done an almost complete and distinctive job in understanding what is happening by interviewing a large number of people for a long period of time under serious danger makes Abdurrahman Gök stand out for the award."
- The awards were presented at the 9th FilmAmed Documentary Film Festival. Journalist Abdurrahman Gök received the festival's Kemal Kurkut People's Choice Award. Gök received the award from Kurkut's mother, Sican Kurkut.
