= Hatice Duman =

Kurdish journalist (born 1974)

- Citizenship: Turkey
- Education: Trakya University
- Occupation: Journalist

Hatice Duman (born April 5, 1974 in Malatya) is a Kurdish journalist and editor-in-chief of the daily Atılım (The Leap), the official newspaper of the Marxist–Leninist Communist Party (MLKP) in Turkey. Since April 9, 2003, she has been in prison, accused of being a manager of a terrorist organisation. On October 16, 2012, Turkey's Supreme Court of Appeals confirmed the sentence of life-time imprisonment against her.

== Early years ==
Hatice Duman was born in the eastern province of Malatya on April 5, 1974. Her family moved to the southeastern province of Gaziantep for economic reasons and she finished elementary and middle school there. She graduated from Trakya University's Vocational School of Higher Education in 1996.

== Journalistic career ==
She began working as a reporter for Atılım in 1996 and in 1997 started working on the chief editor's desk for the same newspaper.

== Imprisonment ==
The police raided Duman's house on April 9, 2003, claiming Duman was someone they were searching for in relation to two robberies. Duman was convicted of making propaganda and being a member of the banned Marxist Leninist Communist Party (MLKP), and given a lifetime sentence in 2011.

According to a report by Füsun Erdoğan, Duman said: "the state employed all its violence and repression to prevent us from perceiving, seeing and writing the truth. All the issues we published were confiscated, and we were prevented from following the news. Our cameras and recorders were broken. They seized our computers. They filed suits against the confiscated issues of our newspaper."

She was prosecuted in May 2007 under the Anti-Terror Law of Turkey.

She is currently held in Bakırköy Prison in İstanbul.

== See also ==
- List of arrested journalists in Turkey
