= Murder of Kemal Kurkut =

Murder in Turkey

Kemal Kurkut was a 23-year old university student. He was killed by Turkish police officers during the Newroz festivities in Diyarbakır on the 21.03.2017 . Two police officers, known mainly as the defendants Yakip SENOCAK and Onur METE, were investigated for the murder. In March 2022, a court ruled that Kurkut died within the legal framework.

== Background ==
During the Newroz festivities or Diyarbakır in 2017, a large contingent of security forces was deployed. About 100'000 people have attended the Newroz that year. The crowds chanted slogans of the Peoples' Democratic Party (HDP) and protested against the presidential system about which on the 16 April 2017 was to be voted in a referendum.

== Death ==
Initially it was reported that a man armed with a knife wanted to storm the festivities and was shot by the security officers at the scene. An image of Abdurrahman Gök which depicted the moment of the killing showed Kurkut moving through a police checkpoint, and without a shirt on. He had a knife in one hand in and a water bottle in the other, and in the image there can be seen a police officer pointing his gun at Kurkuts back. The police claimed that the officer shot Kurkut, believing he was a suicide bomber. He was buried the next day in Battalgazi, Malatya.

== Aftermath ==
Abdurrahman Gök had to deliver the images which depicted the death of Kemal Kurkut to the prosecutors office eight days after Kemal Kurkut was killed. Two police officers were summoned to the prosecutors office to testify, one was released following his testimony, while the other was released pending trial and charged with the killing of Kemal Kurkut. On the 2 October 2017, the court decided that the trial was to begin without O.M. being charged with deliberate murder, as the bullets which caused Kemal Kurkut's death, were not traceable back to his gun.

=== Trial ===
The trial against Y.Ş. began on the 14 December 2017. Y.Ş. was the one who appeared in the photograph pointing a gun at Kemal Kurkut. The trial was marked by conflicting reports about the origin of the bullet which caused Kurkuts death. The first report from the 20 December 2018 indicated that the bullet bounced from the floor, while the second from the 28 February 2019, stated that Kurkut was directly targeted by the police officer. The lawyers of the defendant Y.Ş. demanded a third report, which eventually was produced by 30 May 2019, and confirmed the earlier finding of the first report, which stated that Kemal Kurkut was not directly targeted, but the bullet which caused his death bounced from the floor. On the 17 November 2020, during the 11th hearing in the trial, Y.Ş. was acquitted on grounds that the murder weapon was not identifiable. In March 2022, a court in Diyarbakir ruled that Kurkut was killed "within the legal framework", that the police officer accused of the murder did not commit a crime and that Article 17 of the constitution which regulates the right for life was not violated.

== Reactions ==
The Peoples' Democratic Party (HDP) condemned the acquittal of Y.Ş. and the fact that at the same time the prosecution demands up to 20 years imprisonment for Abdurrahman Gök, the photographer of the image.

The president of the Diyarbakır Bar Association also condemned the release of Y.Ş., lamenting that the murder of a Kurd wasn't worth a sentence to prison.

== Photograph of the killing ==
The photographer Abdurrahman Gök received a Metin Göktepe Award for the image of the killing of Kemal Kurkut in 2017. The photograph had an important role in identifying the police officer Y.Ş.
