= Alican Uludağ =

- Born: 1986 (age 39–40); Erzincan, Turkey
- Citizenship: Turkish
- Education: Gazi University Faculty of Communication (BA Journalism, 2008)
- Occupation: Journalist
- Awards: Uğur Mumcu Award (2018); Turkish Journalists' Association Award (2020); Raif Badawi Award (2021)

Alican Uludağ (born 1986 in Erzincan, Turkey), is a Turkish journalist known for his work in court reporting, human rights violations, and political trials. Throughout his career, he has followed corruption cases, courtroom news, and major events from the field. On February 19, 2026, he was arrested on charges of "insulting the president" due to social media posts.Alican Uludağ was formally arrested on February 19, 2026.

== Early life and education ==
Alican Uludağ was born in 1986 in Erzincan, Turkey. He graduated from Gazi University 99 Faculty of Communication, Department of Journalism, in 2008. He is married with two children.

== Career ==
Uludağ began his journalism career in 2008 as a court reporter at Cumhuriyet newspaper. He monitored human rights violations reflected in the courts, corruption cases, and attempts to close files. After Cumhuriyet, he worked at Olay TV and NOW TV; following the channel's 2020 closure, he founded ankaragazetecisi.com. Since March 2021, he has been a court reporter for DW Turkish.

== Legal proceedings ==
Uludağ faced prior investigations for "slander and insult" following a complaint by former Chief Prosecutor Yüksel Kocaman, using his social media posts and news as evidence. He was probed for "spreading misleading information" over an X post on the Gebze Arslan Apartment collapse (4 deaths). A post about Berk Akand, convicted in the Şule Çet case, led to a Bakırköy Prosecutor's Office lawsuit seeking up to 3 years imprisonment. He received 10-month sentences in some cases.

On February 19, 2026, he was detained in Ankara over an X post about the Atatürk Airport bombing trial, charged with "insulting the president" (TCK 299) and "spreading misleading information" (TCK 217/A). After a house search, he was transferred to Istanbul, where the 9th Peace Criminal Judgeship ordered arrest citing strong suspicion, evidence tampering risk, and lack of remorse. In court, Uludağ stated: "I've done journalism for 18 years; if criticizing the President lands us in prison, why the motto 'Justice is the foundation of property' and why a Constitution?"

On May 21, 2026, Uludağ went on trial at an Ankara court on charges of "insulting the president" and "disseminating misleading information." Following his statements via the SEGBİS video-conferencing system from Silivri Prison, the court ordered his conditional release after three months of pre-trial detention.

== Reactions ==
Numerous national and international organizations and figures reacted strongly to Alican Uludağ's arrest on February 19, 2026, widely condemning it as an attack on press freedom and journalism.

In Turkey, Journalists' Union of Turkey (TGS) described the decision as alarming for the profession and judicial independence, vowing to continue journalism in Uludağ's spirit. DİSK Basın-İş and other unions demanded his immediate release, declaring "Alican Uludağ did not remain silent and will not," while calling for an end to pressures on journalists. DEM Party Group Deputy Chair Gülistan Kılıç Koçyiğit criticized the home raid in front of his children as an assault on press freedom and public right to information, viewing arrest as intimidation rather than justice. TİP Party Leader Erkan Baş stated Uludağ was targeted for reporting on figures like Akın Gürlek, urging accountability and release. CHP Deputy Leader Sezgin Tanrıkulu noted no presidential complaint in the file, questioning AKP and MHP. Haber-Sen affirmed "journalism is not a crime, truth cannot be tried."

Internationally, DW Director General Barbara Massing called the custody with 30 police officers "an open threat" revealing government suppression of press freedom. Reporters Without Borders (RSF) labeled the court decision a "scandal." Article 19 demanded all charges be dropped immediately. The German government, via Culture Minister Wolfram Weimer, urged Turkey to release Uludağ and ensure journalists work freely. European Parliament Turkey Rapporteur Nacho Sánchez Amor criticized the detention over a year-old statement as reflecting Turkey's poor democratic standards. The European Federation of Journalists (EFJ) demanded Uludağ's immediate release as an attack on press freedom.

== Awards and memberships ==
Uludağ received several journalism awards:

- 2018: Uğur Mumcu Investigative Journalism Award by the Contemporary Journalists Association (high-speed train crash report)
- 2020: Turkish Journalists' Association (TGC) Political News Award ("New Power Centers in the Judiciary" series)
- 2021: Raif Badawi Award for Courageous Journalists by the Friedrich Naumann Foundation (for independent journalism in Turkey)

He is a member of the Journalists' Union of Turkey (TGS), Contemporary Journalists Association (ÇGD), and Journalists' Association.
