= Jake Hanrahan =

British journalist (born 1990)

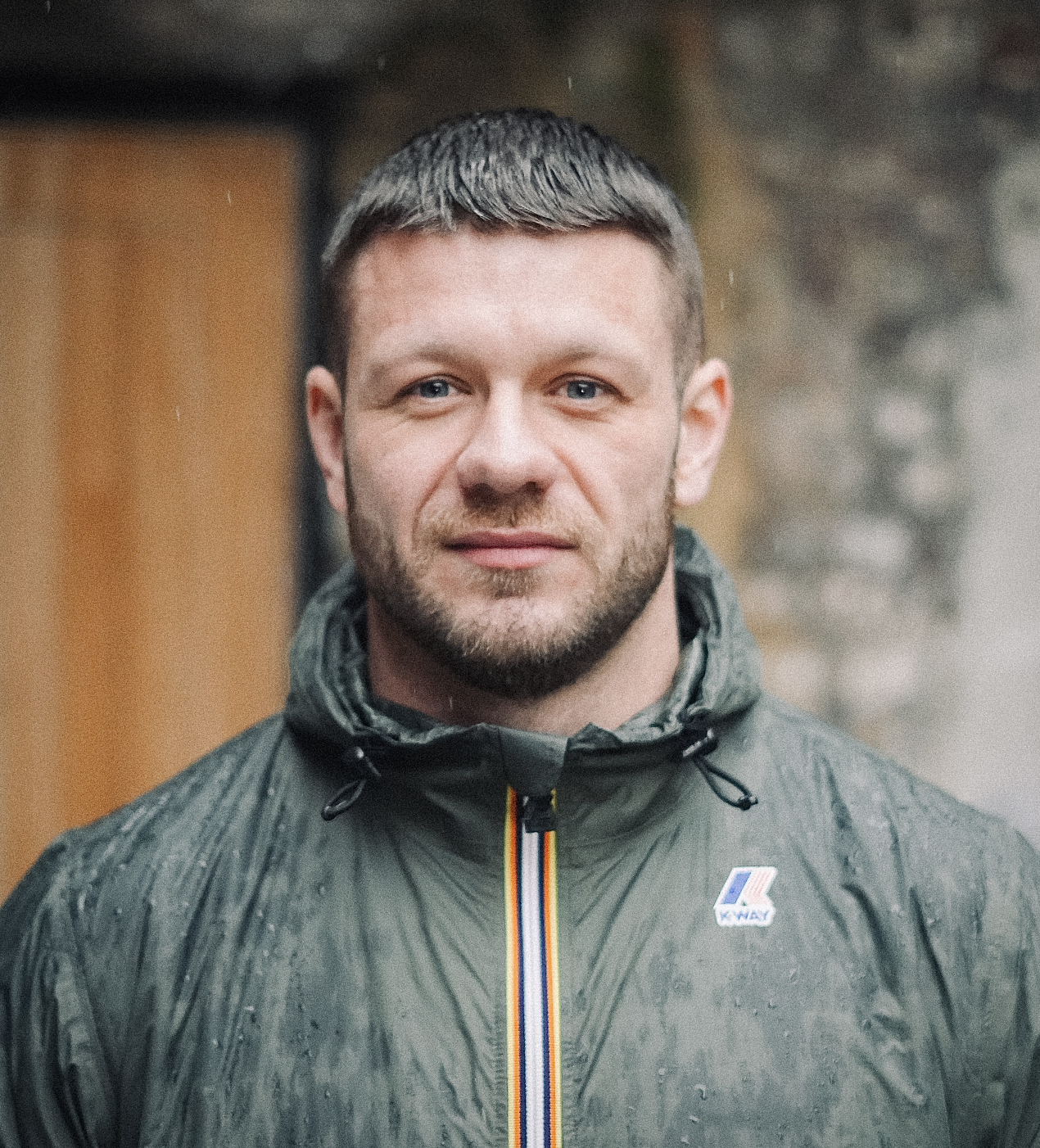
- Born: 23 January 1990 (age 36)
- Occupations: Journalist, filmmaker
- Employer: H11, Popular Front
- Website: jakehanrahan.com

Jake Hanrahan (born 23 January 1990) is a British journalist and documentary filmmaker from the East Midlands. He reports on underground counterculture, armed conflict, and organised crime. Hanrahan is known for his raw on-the-ground approach to reporting, gaining access to difficult stories and embedding into dangerous communities across the world.

== Career ==
Hanrahan started his career as a self-taught freelance journalist. His work was published in The Guardian, Esquire, Rolling Stone and Wired. In 2014 Hanrahan was hired by VICE News, and later HBO. He worked as an on-screen reporter and producer, working in places such as Syria, Iraq, Ukraine, Kurdistan and Palestine.

At VICE News, Hanrahan built a reputation as a journalist focussed on commonly unreported stories. He covered paramilitary factions, criminal gangs, environmental militancy, civil unrest and dark web networks. Hanrahan's best known work at VICE News is his embedded documentaries reporting on Kurdish rebel groups. He also reported on the war in Donbas, embedding with both the Ukrainian Ground Forces and the separatist forces in Donetsk.

Hanrahan's work covering the Kurdistan Workers' Party (PKK), a Kurdish militant group, in southeast Turkey, landed him in prison. He was arrested in September 2015 in Turkey with his colleagues Philip Pendlebury and Mohammed Rasool, after the three embedded with the PKK's youth wing, the YDG-H, who were actively fighting the Turkish Armed Forces. Hanrahan spent two weeks in several maximum security prisons in Turkey, including Diyarbakır Prison and Adana F-type prison, before being deported back to the UK. Hanrahan called on Turkey to release translator Mohammed Rasool, who remained in detention for over 100 days after Hanrahan's release.

In 2017, Hanrahan left VICE News due to differences with the new management's editorial direction. He worked again as a freelance journalist, investigating the neo-Nazi militant group Atomwaffen Division. His reporting on this, as part of Documenting Hate, went on to win a duPont Award in 2020 for Frontline PBS and ProPublica.

== Popular Front ==
In 2018 Hanrahan founded the grassroots independent media platform Popular Front, which consists of a podcast, documentaries and a magazine. Popular Front has so far rejected all corporate investment and advertising. The company is funded solely via Patreon and merchandise sales. Popular Front has a youth audience with millions of followers across social media. In a 2022 Complex magazine profile on Popular Front, Hanrahan was named "one of the most important voices in war and conflict reporting".

Popular Front is best known for its documentary work, showing under-reported war and conflict stories across the world. Their 2020 documentary Plastic Defence has amassed more than 3.5 million views on YouTube and attracted much media attention. The film shows unique access to the man who invented secret 3D printed firearms in Europe. In 2022, Hanrahan made a documentary embedded with anti-fascist Ukrainian football hooligans who'd volunteered to fight against the Russian invasion as part of the Territorial Defense Forces. This film was screened across Europe and America via various different football ultras organisations.

== Projects ==
Hanrahan regularly releases new creative projects developed under his production studio H11. Hanrahan and his team produced the hit podcast series Q-Clearance: The Hunt for QAnon in 2020 for iHeartRadio. They aimed to clarify the origins and nature of the political conspiracy theory QAnon. The following year Hanrahan launched Megacorp, an investigative series exposing the malpractices of Amazon.

In 2021, Hanrahan's first book Gargoyle was published. It's a compilation of his written work, "collecting his on-the-ground reporting from all the wrong crowds." It sold over 3000 copies in the first months it was on sale.

In 2023, Hanrahan launched the podcast "Sad Oligarch", investigating the suspicious deaths of Russian business men officially classed as suicides.
