= Murat Aksoy =

Turkish journalist

Murat Aksoy is a Turkish journalist. He was one of the prominent columnists who have lost their job because of government's pressure on media in Turkey. He was arrested, along with Turkish singer Atilla Taş and 27 other people in September 2016 for alleged membership in "an armed terrorist organization". Although a court ordered his release, the decision was reversed after an appeal by the prosecutor. On 8 March 2018 he was sentenced to 2 years and 1 month of imprisonment. On the 4 January 2019 he was released on probation.
