= Erol Zavar =

- Born: 1 January 1969 (age 57); Zonguldak, Turkey
- Occupation: Journalist
- Known for: Editor of Odak Magazine, political prisoner

Erol Zavar (born 1 January 1969) is the former editor of Odak magazine, a political prisoner, and a poet from Turkey.

Zavar was sentenced to life imprisonment by the Ankara State Security Court No. 2 in 2001 on charges of attempting to change the constitutional order in accordance with Article 146 of the Turkish Penal Code. He was sent to Tekirdağ F Type Prison No. 1 for the execution of his sentence. Zavar was allegedly neglected by prison and hospital staff after he was found to be suffering from bladder cancer.

In 2004, a campaign was organized by his lawyers, his wife and relatives due to his illness. The campaign resulted in him being given treatment for cancer. Despite nine surgeries, his health deteriorated. In 2006, a new campaign was organized with the motto Don't Let This Light Go Out. The campaign is still ongoing.

Within the scope of the campaign, a 35-minute documentary film, released by Grup Kizilirmak, was directed by Nesrin Cavadzade and Hüseyin Karabey. The film focuses on the health problems of prisoners and inmates held under F-Type isolation based on the example of Erol Zavar.

This situation of Zavar was also published in the newspapers Cumhuriyet, Evrensel, Radikal, Sabah, Özgür Gündem, Birgün, Yeniharman and Kaçak Yayın.

Erol Zavar's first poetry book, Death, was published at Cadde Publications in July 2006.

In 2019, Zavar was treated for a heart condition at Bolu Izzet Baysal University Hospital.
