= Mohammed Rasool =

Iraqi-Kurdish journalist

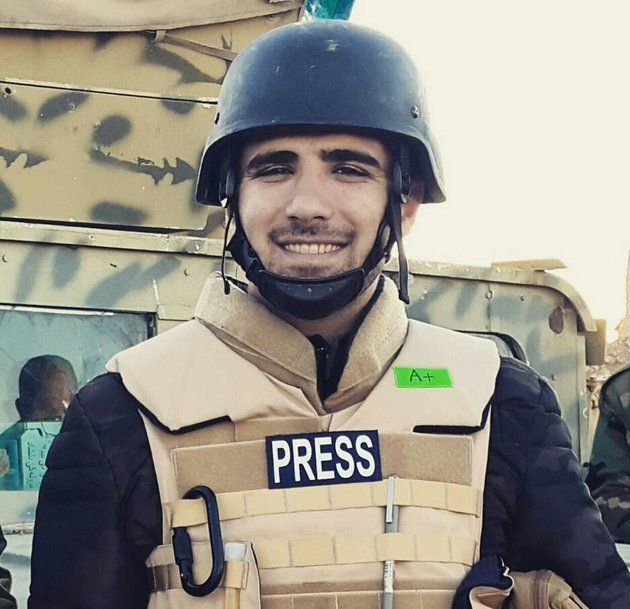
Mohammed Rasool was arrested with two British colleagues who were released after 11 days. Photograph: Vice Media.

Mohammed Rasool (Arabic: محمد رسول) is an Iraqi-Kurdish journalist who was held in a maximum security prison from 27 August 2015 to 5 January 2016. He was released on bail.

Rasool was initially detained for his reporting on Kurdistan Workers' Party (PKK) with Vice journalists Jake Hanrahan and Philip Pendlebury, but they were released on 3 September.
