= Anti-Terror Law of Turkey =

Turkish Statutory Law 1991–present

The Anti-Terror Law of Turkey (ATL), Anti-Terror Act of Turkey (ATA) or Terörle Mücadele Yasası (TMY) in Turkish, is a nation-wide law in Turkey that was written in 1991 to strongly criminalize acts of terrorism.

== Background ==
Northern Iraq borders Southeastern Turkey

The ATA was passed in 1991 during the Gulf War alongside the declaration of martial law in the country. In part, it was created as a response to the Kurdistan Workers' Party (PKK), a militant political party in favor of a separate Kurdistan and autonomy for Kurds in Turkey. In 1984, the group began organizing in support of Kurds in the Kurdish-Turkish conflict. The PKK established its base of operations in Northern Iraq, close to Southeastern Turkey in 1991. Due to this and the rising Kurdish nationalism in Turkey, the ATA was enacted and enforced.

== Contents ==
The ATA is made up of five sections that serve different purposes.

=== First section ===
The first section is made up of Articles 1–8. It contains definitions of terrorism and terrorist organizations. According to its contents, some act that are crimes according to the Turkish Penal Code (TPC) are redefined as terrorist. Article 1 maintains that for something to be declared a terrorist act, it must meet all three of the following conditions:

1. The act must have been "done by means of pressure, force and violence, terror, intimidation, oppression, or threat." Notably, "The concepts of force and violence, and intimidation, are well-defined in Turkish law....However, the concepts of pressure, oppression, threat, or terror have not been used extensively in Turkish law."
2. The goal orientation must be:
  1. To change the characteristics of the Republic of Turkey as specified in the Constitution "[its political legal, social, secular, and economic system, and the characteristics of the Republic enunciated in Article 2 of the Constitution and by way of reference in the Preamble]"
  2. To damage the indivisible unity of the State with its territory and nation, and to endanger the existence of the Turkish State and Republic
  3. To weaken, destroy or seize the authority of the State
  4. To eliminate fundamental rights and freedoms (i.e. political freedoms, religious freedom, personal freedom, inviolability of the residence, protection of confidentiality, and provisions related to freedom to work)
  5. To damage the internal and external security of the State, public order, or general health
3. The act must be committed by a person or a group of people who are members of an organization. In cases where the same act is committed by individuals, the law does not apply.
  1. "According to the last paragraph of Article 2 of the [ATL], individuals who commit crimes in the name of an organization even though they are not members of the organization would be guilty of terrorist crimes. For purposes of this law, an organization is formed when two or more people gather around the same aim."

=== Second section ===
The second section is made up of Articles 9–15. It "regulates some special mechanisms to try terrorist crimes". This includes the nomination of the State Security Courts as the court to prosecute acts that are criminalized by this law. Though, these courts were later disbanded through the 2004 amendments as part of Turkey's movement to become part of the European Union.

=== Third section ===
The third section is made up of Articles 16–18. It creates sentencing times specific to crimes covered under the law.

=== Fourth section ===
The fourth section contains Articles 19–21. It "regulates rewards, remedies, and protection mechanisms for the Public Officials engaged in the struggle against terrorism and those helping authorities."

=== Fifth section ===
The fifth section is Articles 22–25 and ten temporary articles. It "contains temporary articles for crimes committed before April 8, 1991."

== Usage ==
Though the act's name is the Anti-Terror Law, it has been used to prosecute many non-violent actions. The broad definitions provided for terrorist acts and organizations in the first section allow for more actions to fall under the law's scope. The ATA is often used to prosecute Journalists. As of 2013, 71 journalists were charged under the ATA.

=== Notable people tried and incarcerated under the ATA ===
- Bedri Adanır
- Irfan Aktan
- Necmiye Alpay
- Erdogan Altan
- Murat Altünoz
- Ilkem Ezgi Asam
- Fatih Özgür Aydin
- Zeycan Balci Simsek
- Rifat Basaran
- Ismail Besikçi
- Ali Bulus
- Gurbet Çakar
- Hasan Cakkalkurt
- Ibrahim Çiçek
- Ziya ÇiçekçiI
- Çayan Demirel
- Temel Demirer
- Rüstü Demirkaya
- Hatice Duman
- Namik Durukan
- Cevat Düsün
- Füsun Erdoğan
- Busra Ersanli
- Merve Erol
- Mustafa Gök
- Kemal Göktas
- N. Mehmet Güler
- Mehmet Karabas
- Kadri Kaya
- Ozan Kilinç
- Vedat Kursun
- Filiz Koçali
- Ertuğrul Mavioğlu
- Orhan Miroglu
- Bayram Namaz
- Önder Öner
- Haci Orman
- Emin Orhan
- Ramazan Pekgöz
- Çetin Poyraz
- Irmak Saadet
- Veysi Sarisözen
- Sedat Senoglu
- Gökçer Tahincioglu
- Hakan Tahmaz
- Mehdi Tanrikulu
- Tayip Temel
- Behdin Tunç
- Faysal Tunç
- Ferhat Tunç
- Nedim Türfent
- Ziya Ulusoy
- Figen Yüksekdag
- Leyla Zana
- Deniz Zarakolu
- Ragip Zarakolu

=== Books penalized under the ATA ===
- A draft copy of a book by Ahmet Sik exploring the "relationship between the Turkish Police and the influential Islamic “Gülen movement "
- Bedri Adanir was arrested 5 January 2010 for publishing On Culture and Arts, a collection of speeches by Abdullah Ocalan, founding member of the banned Kurdish Workers’ Party (PKK). "The book is said to refer to Ocalan as “chairman" and PKK members as "guerillas" and "martyrs". He is accused of "spreading propaganda for an illegal organisation". 38 copies were seized.
- The book More Difficult Decisions than Death resulted in the 14-month incarceration of the author, N. Mehmet Güler.
- Bedri Adanır published On Culture and Arts, a work made of speeches by members of the Kurdistan Workers' Party's Abdullah Öcalan. He was arrested after these books were seized and declared propaganda under the Anti-Terrorism law.

== Criticisms ==
The law punishes crime in a notably different from the pre-existing Turkish Penal Code. For one, the TPC punishes crimes that have tangibly occurred. The ATA, instead was able to punish crimes based solely on their intent. Also, people penalized through the ATA were tried under the Turkish legal system rather than under the ordinary criminal justice system.

The definition of "organizations" was a new creation of the ATA as well. Accordingly, organizations covers all groups, not just those with ideological associations. Any collection of people alleged to be a group can be thus declared a terrorist organization. In addition, article 7 makes "establishing, organizing, managing, promoting, becoming a member of such an organization, or aiding and abetting such an organization’s member(s)" a crime. Article 7 also notes that while some crimes may not be terrorist acts directly, acts that aide others' terrorist acts are punishable.

Both the European Union (EU) and the European Court of Human Rights (ECtHR) criticized the law for both its wording and its usage. Amending the ATA was critical for Turkey becoming a part of the EU. The EU forced Turkey to disband State Security Courts (SSC) in 2004 for Turkey to meet the "same objective standards and criteria" as other candidates. The SSC was also the subject of several ECtHR applications, most of them being settled against Turkey. The SSC was scrutinized for several reasons by the two organisations, including the fact that one judge and one prosecutor for each trial were from the Turkish military, the stricter procedures, the reliance on a special investigative branch of the security forces, and the extended hours of incommunicado detention and the limitations on lawyers that the accused endure.
