= Turkish Penal Code =

The Turkish Penal Code (Turkish: Türk Ceza Kanunu) is the codification of Turkish criminal law. It took effect on 1 June 2005 and replaced the Turkish Penal Code of 1926, which had until then been in effect. This in turn has become known as the "old penal code" in the rare decisions that still need to apply it.

== History ==
With the assignment of the Ministry of Justice, a commission was established on 21 December 1999 for the preparation of the new penal code and drafted it in 2001. The draft was sent to the Grand National Assembly of Turkey by the commission on 12 March 2003. The draft law began to be discussed in the parliament and on 26 September 2004, the new Turkish Penal Code was promulgated. It was published in the Official Gazette on 12 October 2004 and entered into force on 1 June 2005.

== See also ==
- Article 299 (Turkish Penal Code)
- Article 301 (Turkish Penal Code)
- Article 312 (Turkish Penal Code)
- Law on crimes committed against Atatürk
- Anti-Terror Law of Turkey
