= Azadiya Welat =

Kurdish newspaper

Azadiya Welat (Kurdish for: "Freedom of the Country") was a newspaper in the Kurdish language published in Turkey. It was shut down on 28 August 2016 when police raided the newspaper's headquarters in Diyarbakir, taking all 27 staff into custody.

== History and profile ==
The paper was first published as a weekly newspaper with the name Welat in Istanbul on 22 February 1992. In 1996 it began to be published with its current name, Azadiya Welat. In 2003 the headquarters of the paper moved from Istanbul to Diyarbakır. In 2006 it became a daily newspaper.

Its editor-in-chief was sentenced to 3 years in prison in 2010. A journalist who was distributing Azadiya Welat was murdered in 2014.

Kurdish inmates in some Turkish jails were not allowed to receive the newspaper in 2007. This interdiction is justified by a reference to the law no. 5275. In 2015, the European Court of Human Rights ruled the unpredictability of how the law is applied is a violation of article 10 of the Convention.
