= Dicle News Agency =

Dicle News Agency Dicle Haber Ajansı
- Industry: News agency
- Founded: 4 April 2002
- Headquarters: Beyoğlu, Istanbul, Turkey
- Website: http://dihaber.net

Dicle Haber Ajansı, DİHA (English: Dicle News Agency), is a "pro-Kurdish" news agency of Turkey.

== Activity ==
In March 2012, Reporters without Borders reported that 27 of its journalists were in prison. DIHA produces news reports on Turkish, Kurdish, and English

DIHA had several times difficulties with the Turkish authorities and several of its journalists were arrested. In March 2009, following the coverage of the Newroz festivals in Siirt, Abdurrahman Gök was arrested and charged with making propaganda on behalf of the Kurdistan Workers' Party.

Between December 2015 and May 2016, 12 of its journalists were arrested. Turkish authorities have blocked access to the website 40 times; the website changes its address every time it is blocked. Following the 2016 Turkish coup d'état attempt, it was one of more than 150 news outlets shut down by the authorities.

== See also ==
- Media of Turkey
- List of arrested journalists in Turkey
