= Journalists' Union of Turkey =

Established in Istanbul in 1952, the Journalists Union of Turkey (Türkiye Gazeteciler Sendikasi – TGS) to represent journalists and media workers is the oldest and the biggest trade union organisation for journalists in the media industry in Turkey.

The organisation aims to protect and strengthen the rights and freedoms of journalists, to promote labour rights, social justice, democracy, professional and ethical standards, press freedom and international solidarity.

Based in Istanbul, TGS currently has five local branches around the country with over 1.000 members working for over 100 different media companies in Turkey.

TGS is affiliated to Türk-Is Confederation of workers union in Turkey, the biggest confederation in the country with over 800.000 members.

In 1963, following the adoption by the Turkish Parliament of new laws (274 and 275) on trade unions, all workers’ union got the right to sign collective agreement and the right to organise strikes to defend their rights. The next year (1964), the TGS signed its first collective agreement for journalists working at the daily newspapers Milliyet and Cumhuriyet.

In 1965, the TGS became member of the International Federation of Journalists (IFJ), the largest organisation of journalists’ trade unions in the world.

On March 10, 1969, TGS organised its first strike at the Anadolu news agency following the negotiation failure. One week later, the strike ended by the signature of a new collective agreement.

Following the military coup of September 12, 1980, journalists’ fundamental rights have been severely attacked. All the previous rights have been cancelled by the military junta ruling the country. A new law has been created to impose notary costs for workers who want to become member of any trade union organisation. Another law forbid the signature of any collective agreement by unions which can’t represent less than 10 percent of workers in its sectors. The rules to go on strike have been strengthened. Protests to express solidarity or demand some rights were totally forbidden. Press rights have been diminished and newspapers have been forced to stop. On May 7, 1983, a new sectorial regulation has been adopted which ousted the “technician” out of the press sector.

== De-unionisation years ==
At the beginning of the 90s, a de-unionisation process led by media bosses and supported by Turkish governments deeply affected journalists in Turkey and directly targeted the unions. Since 1992, journalists working for the Dogan Group (Milliyet and Hürriyet) have been put under pressure by media owners to resign from their union.

In April 1995, following a new law concerning audiovisual journalism, new changes have been made to the TGS statutes to allow radio and television workers to become member of the Journalists Union of Turkey.

On November 28, 2004, during its 17th General Assembly, TGS delegates have decided to join the European Federation of Journalists (EFJ), the regional organisation of the IFJ.

In 2010, TGS successfully hosted the EFJ Congress in Istanbul and launched the first international solidarity campaign named ‘Set journalists free in Turkey’.

== Renaissance of TGS ==
In May 2013, following the Gezi Park protests in Istanbul, a new generation of journalists has decided to be more active in their union. After being elected at TGS’ December 2013 Congress, the young activists and leadership launched the ‘5N1K1Sendika’ campaign (4W1H1Union) and start a new strategy to change the union’s image among journalists and potential members. TGS managed to increase its membership by 20% in just three weeks passing the national threshold to sign new collective agreements. In two years, at least seven new collective agreements have been signed by TGS in different media workplaces enhancing workers' rights and attracting new members.
