= Censorship in Turkey =

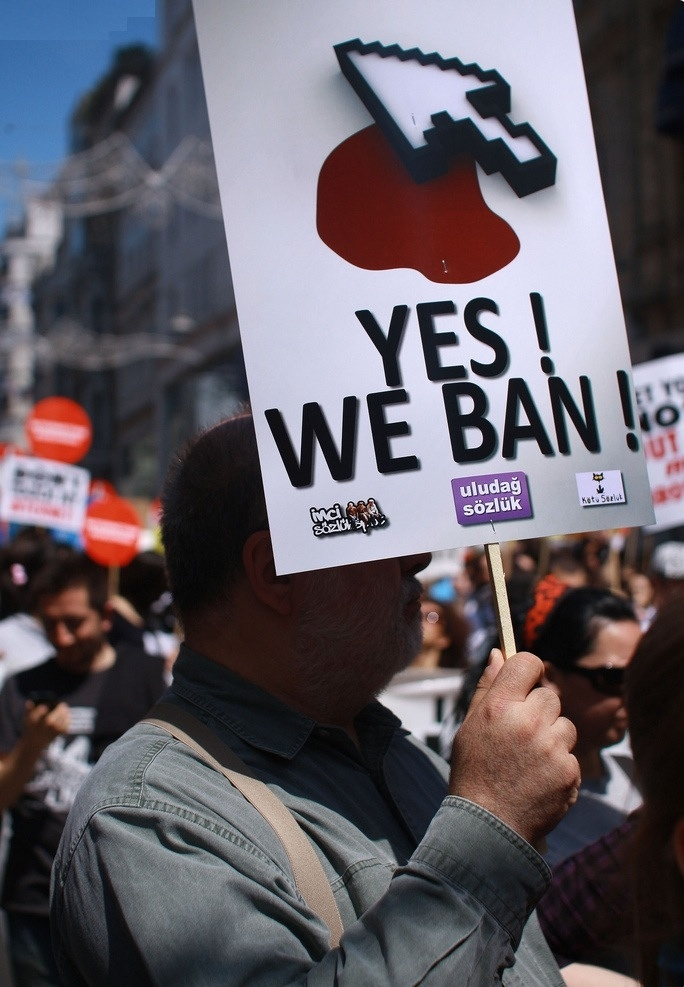
2011 protests against internet censorship in Turkey

Censorship in Turkey is regulated by domestic and international legislation, the latter (in theory) taking precedence over domestic law, according to Article 90 of the Constitution of Turkey (so amended in 2004).

Despite legal provisions, freedom of the press in Turkey has steadily deteriorated from 2010 onwards, with a precipitous decline following the attempted coup in July 2016. The Turkish government of Recep Tayyip Erdoğan has arrested hundreds of journalists, closed or taken over dozens of media outlets, and prevented journalists and their families from traveling. By some accounts, Turkey currently accounts for one-third of all journalists imprisoned around the world.

Since 2013, Freedom House ranks Turkey as "Not Free". In 2015 Reporters Without Borders ranked Turkey at the 149th place out of over 180 countries, between Mexico and DR Congo, with a score of 44.16. In 2025, according to the same organisation 90% of the media is controlled by the government and Turkey ranks 159th out of 180 countries in terms freedom of press.

In the third quarter of 2015, the independent Turkish press agency Bianet recorded a strengthening of attacks on opposition media under the Justice and Development Party (AKP) interim government. Bianet's final 2015 monitoring report confirmed this trend and underlined that, once the AKP had regained a majority in parliament after the AKP interim government period, the Turkish government further intensified its pressure on the country's media.

According to Freedom House,

The government enacted new laws that expanded both the state's power to block websites and the surveillance capability of the National Intelligence Organization (MİT). Journalists faced unprecedented legal obstacles as the courts restricted reporting on corruption and national security issues. The authorities also continued to aggressively use the penal code, criminal defamation laws, and the antiterrorism law to crack down on journalists and media outlets. Verbal attacks on journalists by senior politicians—including Recep Tayyip Erdoğan, the incumbent prime minister who was elected president in August—were often followed by harassment and even death threats against the targeted journalists on social media. Meanwhile, the government continued to use the financial and other leverage it holds over media owners to influence coverage of politically sensitive issues. Several dozen journalists, including prominent columnists, lost their jobs as a result of such pressure during the year, and those who remained had to operate in a climate of increasing self-censorship and media polarization.

In 2012 and 2013 the Committee to Protect Journalists (CPJ) ranked Turkey as the worst journalist jailer in the world (ahead of Iran and China), with 49 journalists sitting in jail in 2012 and 40 in 2013. Twitter's 2014 Transparency Report showed that Turkey filed over five times more content removal requests to Twitter than any other country in the second half of 2014, with requests rising another 150% in 2015.

During its rule since 2002, the ruling AKP has gradually expanded its control over media. Today, numerous newspapers, TV channels and internet portals dubbed as Yandaş Medya ("Partisan Media") or Havuz Medyası ("Pool Media") continue their heavy pro-government propaganda. Several media groups receive preferential treatment in exchange for AKP-friendly editorial policies. Some of these media organizations were acquired by AKP-friendly businesses or directly by Erdogan's own family through questionable funds and processes. Media not friendly to AKP, on the other hand, are threatened with intimidation, inspections and fines. These media group owners face similar threats to their other businesses. An increasing number of columnists have been fired for criticizing the AKP leadership.

The AKP leadership has been criticized by multiple journalists over the years because of censorship.

== History ==
Regional censorship predates the establishment of the Republic of Turkey. On 15 February 1857, the Ottoman Empire issued law governing printing houses (Basmahane Nizamnamesi); books first had to be shown to the governor, who forwarded them to commission for education (Maarif Meclisi) and the police. If no objection was made, the Sultan would then inspect them. Without censure from the Sultan books could not be legally issued. On 24 July 1908, at the beginning of the Second Constitutional Era, censorship was lifted; however, newspapers publishing stories that were deemed a danger to interior or exterior State security were closed. Between 1909 and 1913 four journalists were killed—Hasan Fehmi, Ahmet Samim, Zeki Bey, and Hasan Tahsin (Silahçı).

Following the abolition of the Caliphate in 1924, the Sheikh Said rebellion broke out as part of the complex ethnic conflict that erupted with the creation of a secular Turkish nationalist identity that was rejected by many Kurds, who had long been loyal subjects of the Caliph. Sheikh Said, a Naqshbandi sheikh, accused Turkish nationalists of having "reduced the Caliph to the state of a parasite". The uprising was crushed brutally and martial law was imposed on 25 February 1925. Disagreement in the ruling Republican People's Party ultimately favored more hardline measures and under İsmet İnönü's leadership, the Takrir-i Sükun Kanunu was proposed on 4 March 1925. This law granted the government unchecked powers, and had a number of consequences including the closure of all newspapers except for Cumhuriyet and Hakimiyet-i Milliye (both were official or semi-official state publications). The effect was to censor any criticism of the ruling party, and socialists and communists were arrested and tried by the Independence Tribunals that were established in Ankara under the law. Tevhid-i Efkar, Sebilürreşad, Aydınlık, Resimli Ay, and Vatan were among the newspapers closed and several journalists arrested and tried at the tribunals. The tribunals also closed down the offices of opposition party Terakkiperver Cumhuriyet Fırkası on 3 June 1925, under the pretext that their openly stated support for the protection of religious customs had contributed to the Sheikh Said rebellion.

During World War II (1939–1945) many newspapers were ordered shut, including the dailies Cumhuriyet (5 times, for 5 months and 9 days), Tan (7 times, for 2 months and 13 days), and Vatan (9 times, for 7 months and 24 days).

When the Democrat Party under Adnan Menderes came to power in 1950, censorship entered a new phase. The Press Law changed, sentences and fines were increased. Several newspapers were ordered shut, including the dailies Ulus (unlimited ban), Hürriyet, Tercüman, and Hergün (two weeks each). In April 1960, a so-called investigation commission (Tahkikat Komisyonu) was established by the Grand National Assembly of Turkey. It was given the power to confiscate publications, close papers and printing houses. Anyone not following the decisions of the commission was subject to imprisonment, between one and three years.

Freedom of speech was heavily restricted after the 1980 military coup headed by General Kenan Evren. During the 1980s and 1990s, approaching the topics of secularism, minority rights (in particular the Kurdish issue), and the role of the military in politics risked reprisal.

Article 8 of the Anti-Terror Law (Law 3713), slightly amended in 1995 and later repealed, imposed three-year prison sentences for "separatist propaganda". Despite its name, the Anti-Terror Law punished many non-violent offences. Pacifists have been imprisoned under Article 8. For example, publisher Fatih Tas was prosecuted in 2002 under Article 8 at Istanbul State Security Court for translating and publishing writings by Noam Chomsky, summarizing the history of human rights violations in southeast Turkey; he was acquitted, however, in February 2002. Prominent female publisher Ayşe Nur Zarakolu, who was described by The New York Times as "[o]ne of the most relentless challengers to Turkey's press laws", was imprisoned under Article 8 four times.

Since 2011, the AKP government has increased restrictions on freedom of speech, freedom of the press and internet use, and television content, as well as the right to free assembly. It has also developed links with media groups, and used administrative and legal measures (including, in the case of Doğan Holding, a $2.5 billion tax fine) against critical media groups and critical journalists: "over the last decade the AKP has built an informal, powerful, coalition of party-affiliated businessmen and media outlets whose livelihoods depend on the political order that Erdogan is constructing. Those who resist do so at their own risk." Since his time as prime minister through to his presidency, Erdoğan has sought to control the press, forbidding coverage, restricting internet use and stepping up repression on journalists and media outlets.

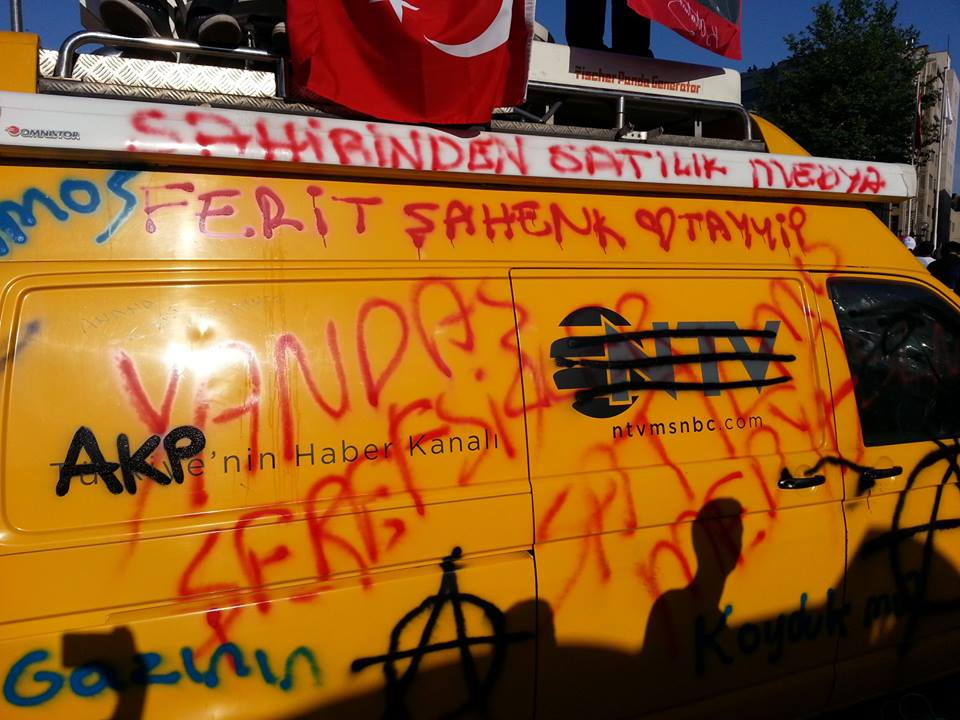
NTV broadcast van covered with protest graffiti during the Gezi Park protests, in response to relative lack of coverage of mainstream media of the protests, 1 June 2013

Foreign media noted that, particularly in the early days (31 May – 2 June 2013) of the Gezi Park protests, the events attracted relatively little mainstream media coverage in Turkey, due to either government pressure on media groups' business interests or simply ideological sympathy by media outlets. The BBC noted that while some outlets are aligned with the AKP or are personally close to Erdoğan, "most mainstream media outlets – such as TV news channels HaberTürk and NTV, and the major centrist daily Milliyet – are loath to irritate the government because their owners' business interests at times rely on government support. All of these have tended to steer clear of covering the demonstrations." Ulusal Kanal and Halk TV provided extensive live coverage from Gezi park.

Turkey's Journalists Union estimated that at least "72 journalists had been fired or forced to take leave or had resigned in the past six weeks since the start of the unrest" in late May 2013 due to pressure from the AKP government. Kemal Kilicdaroglu, head of the Republican People's Party (CHP) party, said 64 journalists have been imprisoned and "We are now facing a new period where the media is controlled by the government and the police and where most media bosses take orders from political authorities." The government says most of the imprisoned journalists have been detained for serious crimes, like membership in an armed terrorist group, that are not related to journalism.

Bianet's periodical reports on freedom of the press in Turkey published in October 2015 recorded a strengthening of attacks on the opposition media during the AKP interim government in the third quarter of 2015. Bianet recorded the censorship of 101 websites, 40 Twitter accounts, 178 news; attacks against 21 journalists, three media organs, and one printing house; civil pursuits against 28 journalists; and the six-fold increase of arrests of media representatives, with 24 journalists and 9 distributors imprisoned. The increased criminalisation of the media follows the freezing of the Kurdish peace process and the failure of AKP to obtain an outright majority at the June 2015 election and to achieve the presidentialisation of the political system. Several journalists and editors are tried for being allegedly members of unlawful organisations, linked to either Kurds or the Gülen movement, others for alleged insults to religion and to the President. In 2015, Cumhuriyet and Doğan Holding were investigated for "terror", "espionage" and "insult". On the date of Bianet's publication, 61 people, of whom 37 journalists, were convict, defendant or suspect for having insulted or personally attacked the then-PM, now-President Recep Tayyip Erdoğan. The European Court of Human Rights condemned Turkey for violation of the freedom of expression in the Abdurrahman Dilipak case (Sledgehammer investigation), and the Turkish Constitutional Court upheld the violation of the freedom of expression of five persons, including a journalist. RTÜK could not yet choose its president; it still warned companies five times and fined them six times. The Supreme Electoral Council ordered 65 channels twice to stop broadcasting the results of the June 2015 election before the end of the publishing ban.

Attacks on media freedom went far beyond the AKP interim government period. The January 2016 updated Bianet report confirmed this trend, underlining that the whole 2014 figure of arrested journalists increased in 2015, reaching the number of 31 journalists arrested (22 in 2014). Once the AKP regained the majority in the elections on 1 November 2015, the Turkish government intensified the pressure on the country's media, for example by banning some TV channels, in particular those linked to the Fethullah Gülen movement, from digital platforms and by seizing control of their broadcasting. In November 2015, Can Dündar, Cumhuriyet's editor in chief and its Ankara representative Erdem Gül were arrested on charges of belonging to a terror organisation, espionage, and for having allegedly disclosed confidential information. Investigation against the two journalists were launched after the newspaper documented the transfer of weapons from Turkey to Syria in trucks of the National Intelligence Organization previously involved in the MİT trucks scandal. Dündar and Gül were released in February 2016 when the Supreme Court decided that their detention was unlawful. In July 2016, on the occasion of the launch of the campaign "I'm a journalist", Mehmet Koksal, project officer of the European Federation of Journalists declared that "Turkey has the largest number of journalists in jail out of all the countries in the Council of Europe."

The situation further deteriorated as a consequence of the 2016 Turkish coup d'état attempt of 15 July 2016 and the subsequent government reaction, leading to an increase of attacks targeting the media in Turkey. Mustafa Cambaz, a photojournalist working for the daily Yeni Şafak was killed during the coup. Turkish soldiers attempting to overthrow the government took control of several newsrooms, including the Ankara-based headquarters of the state broadcaster TRT, where they forced anchor Tijen Karaş to read a statement at gunpoint while members of the editorial board were held hostage and threatened. Soldiers also seized the Istanbul offices of Doğan Media Center which hosted several media outlets, including the Hürriyet daily newspaper and the private TV station CNN Türk, holding journalists and other professionals hostage for many hours overnight. During the coup, in the streets of Istanbul, a photojournalist working for Hürriyet and the Associated Press was assaulted by civilians that were demonstrating against the coup. In the following days, after the government regained power, the state regulatory authority, known as the Information Technologies and Communications Authority, shut down 20 independent online news portals. On 19 July, the Turkish Radio and Television Supreme Council decided to revoke the licence of 24 TV channels and radio stations for being allegedly connected to the Gülen community, without providing much details on this decision. Also, following the decision of declaring the state of emergency for three months taken on 21 July, a series of limitations to freedom of expression and freedom of the media were imposed. The measures within the regime of emergency included the possibility of banning the printing, copying, publishing and distributing of newspapers, magazines, books and leaflets.

An editorial criticizing press censorship published on 22 May 2015 and inclusion of Erdoğan as one of a rising class of "soft" dictators in an op-ed published in May 2015 in The New York Times resulted in a strong reaction by Erdoğan. In an interview Dündar gave in July 2016, before the coup attempt and the government reaction, the journalist stated that "Turkey is going through its darkest period, journalism-wise. It has never been an easy country for journalists, but I think today it has reached its lowest point and is experiencing unprecedented repression".

In October 2022, Turkey passed a law in which the government was given greater powers over social media and online news. The law, according to Human Rights Watch, will allow more power for the government to censor journalists as well as access to information. At the time, 65 employees in media, including journalists were in prison or detention. 25 Kurdish journalists were detained under suspicion of "membership of a terrorist organization" according to Human Rights Watch. Voice of America and Deutche Welle were blocked in Turkey by a Turkish court in June 2022.

== Legislative framework ==
The Constitution of Turkey, at art. 28, states that the press is free and shall not be censored. Expressions of non-violent opinion are safeguarded by Article 10 of the European Convention on Human Rights and Fundamental Freedoms, ratified by Turkey in 1954, and various provisions of the International Covenant on Civil and Political Rights, signed by Turkey in 2000. Many Turkish citizens convicted under the laws mentioned below have applied to the European Court of Human Rights (ECHR) and won their cases.

Yet, Constitutional and international guarantees are undermined by restrictive provisions in the Criminal Code, Criminal Procedure Code, and anti-terrorism laws, effectively leaving prosecutors and judges with ample discretion to repress ordinary journalistic activities. The 2017 Council of Europe Commissioner for Human Rights' report on freedom of expression and media freedom in Turkey reiterated that censorship problems stem mainly from the Turkish Criminal Code and the Turkish Anti- Terrorism Law No. 3713. Prosecutors continued to bring a number of cases for terrorism or membership of an armed organization mainly based on certain statements of the accused, as coinciding with the aims of such organization.

Beside the Article 301, amended in 2008, and Article 312, more than 300 provisions constrained freedom of expression, religion, and association, according to the Turkish Human Rights Association (2002). Article No. 299 of the Turkish Criminal Code provides for criminal defamation of the Head of the State, and it is being increasingly enforced. 18 persons were imprisoned for this offense as of June 2016. Article No. 295 of the Criminal Code is increasingly being enforced as well, with a "press silence" (Yayın Yasağı) being imposed for topics of relevant public interest such as terrorist attacks and bloody blasts. The silence can be imposed on television, print, and radio, as well as on online content, web hosting, and internet service providers. Violations can result in up to three years of detention.

Many of the repressive provisions found in the Press Law, the Political Parties Law, the Trade Union Law, the Law on Associations, and other legislation, were imposed by the military junta after its coup in 1980. As for the Internet, the relevant law is Law No. 5651 of 2007.

According to the Council of Europe Commissioner and to the Venice Commission for Democracy through Law, the decrees issued under the state of emergency since July 2016, conferred an almost limitless discretionary power to the Turkish executive to apply sweeping misure against NGOs, the media and the public sector. Specifically, many NGOs were closed, the media organizations seized or shut down and public sector employees as well as journalists and media workers arrested or intimidated.

== Article 299 ==
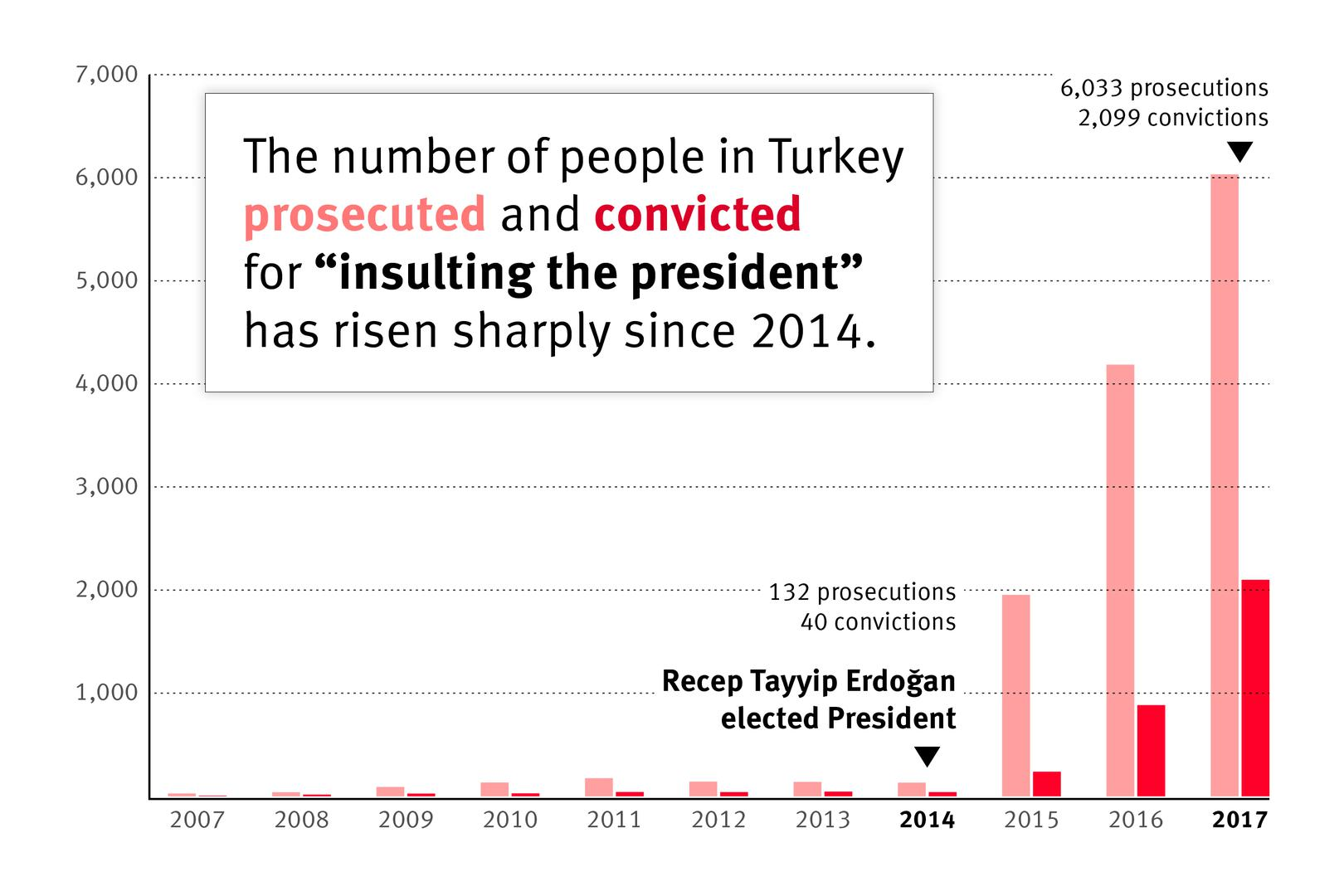
Article 299's prosecution have surged during Erdoğan's presidency.

Article 299 of the Turkish Penal Code is a lèse-majesté law that deems it illegal to "Insult the President of Turkey". A person who is sentenced for a violation of this article can be sentenced to a prison term between one and four years and if the violation was made in public the verdict can be elevated by a sixth. Prosecutions often target critics of the government, independent journalists, and political cartoonists. Between 2014 and 2019, 128,872 investigations were launched for this offense and prosecutors opened 27,717 criminal cases. Turkey's article 299 and article 125, which allows one party to sue for insult despite lack of sufficient evidence, are arguably used as part of SLAPPs.

== Article 301 ==
Article 301 is a provision in the Turkish penal code that, since 2005 made it a punishable offense to insult Turkishness or various official Turkish institutions. Charges were brought in more than 60 cases, some of which were high-profile.

The article was amended in 2008, including changing "Turkishness" into "the Turkish nation", reducing maximum prison terms to 2 years, and making it obligatory to get the approval of the Minister of Justice before filing a case. Changes were deemed "largely cosmetic" by Freedom House, although the number of prosecutions dropped. Although only a few persons were convicted, trials under Art. 301 are seen by human rights watchdogs as a punitive measure in themselves, as time-consuming and expensive, thus exerting a chilling effect on free speech.

- Novelist Orhan Pamuk, at the time a Nobel Prize candidate, was prosecuted under Article 301 for discussing the Armenian genocide; Pamuk subsequently won the prize.
- Perihan Mağden, a columnist for the newspaper Radikal, was tried under the article for provocation, and acquitted on July 27, 2006; Mağden had broached the topic of conscientious objection to mandatory military service as an abuse of human rights.
- The case of the Academics for Peace is also relevant: on January 14, 2016, 27 academics were detained for interrogations after having signed a petition with more than other 1.000 people asking for Peace in the South- East of the country, where there are ongoing violent clashes between the Turkish Army and the PKK. The academics accused the government of breaching international law. An investigation started upon those academics under charges of “terrorism propaganda”, “incitement to hatred and enmity” and for “insulting the State” under Article No. 301 of the Turkish Criminal Code.

== Article 312 ==
Article 312 is a controversial article of the Turkish Penal Code relating to inciting racial or religious hatred encouraging people to disobey the law. It has been used to prosecute journalists for writing about Kurdish issues.

Article 312 imposes three-year prison sentences for incitement to commit an offence and incitement to religious or racial hatred. In 1999 the mayor of Istanbul and current president of the Turkish Republic Recep Tayyip Erdogan was sentenced to 10 months' imprisonment under Article 312 for reading a few lines from a poem that had been authorized by the Ministry of National Education for use in schools, and consequently had to resign. In 2000 the chairman of the Human Rights Association, Akin Birdal, was imprisoned under Article 312 for a speech in which he called for "peace and understanding" between Kurds and Turks, and thereafter forced to resign, as the Law on Associations forbids persons who breach this and several other laws from serving as association officials.

On February 6, 2002, a "mini-democracy package" was voted by Parliament, altering wording of Art. 312. Under the revised text, incitement can only be punished if it presents "a possible threat to public order".

== Other ==
Defamation and libel remain criminal charges in Turkey (Article 125 of the Penal Code). They often result in fines and jail terms. Bianet counted 10 journalists convicted of defamation, blasphemy or incitement to hatred in 2014.

Article 216 of the Penal Code, banning incitement of hatred and violence on grounds of ethnicity, class or religion (with penalties of up to 3 years), is also used against journalists and media workers.

Article 314 of the Penal Code is often invoked against journalists, particularly Kurds and leftists, due to its broad definition of terrorism and of membership in an armed organisation. It carries a minimum sentence of 7,5 years. According to the OSCE, most of 22 jailed journalists as of June 2014 had been charged or condemned based on Art. 314.

Article 81 of the Political Parties Law (imposed by the military junta in 1982) forbids parties from using any language other than Turkish in their written material or at any formal or public meetings. This law is strictly enforced. Kurdish deputy Leyla Zana was jailed in 1994, ostensibly for membership to the PKK.

In 1991, laws outlawing communist (Articles 141 and 142 of the criminal code) and Islamic fundamentalist ideas (Article 163 of the criminal code) were repealed. This package of legal changes substantially freed up expression of leftist thought, but simultaneously created a new offence of "separatist propaganda" under Article 8 of the Anti-Terror Law. Prosecutors also began to use Article 312 of the criminal code (on religious or racial hatred) in place of Article 163.

The 1991 antiterrorism law (the Law on the Fight against Terrorism) has been invoked to charge and imprison journalists for activities that Human Rights Watch define as "nonviolent political association" and speech. The European Court of Human Rights has in multiple occasions found the law to amount to censorship and breach of freedom of expression.

Constitutional amendments adopted in October 2001 removed mention of "language forbidden by law" from legal provisions concerning free expression. Thereafter, university students began a campaign for optional courses in Kurdish to be put on the university curriculum, triggering more than 1,000 detentions throughout Turkey during December and January 2002. Actions have also been taken against the Laz minority. According to the 1923 Treaty of Lausanne, Turkey only recognizes the language rights of the Jewish, Greek and Armenian minorities. The government ignores Article 39(4) of the Treaty of Lausanne, which states that: "[n]o restrictions shall be imposed on the free use by any Turkish national of any language in private intercourse, in commerce, religion, in the press or in publications of any kind or at public meetings." Pressured by the EU, Turkey has promised to review the Broadcasting Law.

Other legal changes in August 2002 allowed for the teaching of languages, including Kurdish. However, limitations on Kurdish broadcasting continue to be strong: according to the EU Commission (2006), "time restrictions apply, with the exception of films and music programmes. All broadcasts, except songs, must be subtitled or translated in Turkish, which makes live broadcasts technically cumbersome. Educational programmes teaching the Kurdish language are not allowed. The Turkish Public Television (TRT) has continued broadcasting in five languages including Kurdish. However, the duration and scope of TRT's national broadcasts in five languages is very limited. No private broadcaster at national level has applied for broadcasting in languages other than Turkish since the enactment of the 2004 legislation." TRT broadcasts in Kurdish (as well as in Arab and Circassian dialect) are symbolic, compared to satellite broadcasts by channels such as controversial Roj TV, based in Denmark.

In 2003, Turkey adopted a freedom of information law. Yet, state secrets that may harm national security, economic interests, state investigations, or intelligence activity, or that "violate the private life of the individual," are exempt from requests. This has made accessing official information particularly difficult.

Amendments in 2013 (the Fourth Judicial Reform package), spurred by the EU accession process and a renewed Kurdish peace process, amended several laws. Antiterrorism regulations were tweaked so that publication of statements of illegal groups would only be a crime if the statement included coercion, violence, or genuine threats. Yet, the reform was deemed as not reaching international human rights standards, since it did not touch upon problematic norms such as the Articles 125, 301 and 314 of the Penal Code. In 2014, a Fifth Judicial Reform package was passed, which among others reduced the maximum period pretrial detention from 10 to 5 years. Consequently, several journalists were released from jail, pending trial.

New laws in 2014 were nevertheless detrimental to freedom of speech.

- February 2014 amendments to the Law No. 5651 ("Internet Law") allowed the Telecommunication Authority (TİB) powers to block websites on vague grounds of privacy protection, with only ex-post court intervention within 48h to confirm the block. A September 2014 amendment to Law no. 5651 had also allowed TİB to block websites “for national security, the restoration of public order, and the prevention of crimes”; this was later overturned by the Constitutional Court in October.
- April 2014 amendments to secret service regulations (Law Amending the Law on State Intelligence Services and the National Intelligence Organization) granted more powers to the MİT, including the faculty to access any personal data without a court order, as well as personal legal immunity for breaches of the law. It also made it a crime, punished with up to 9 years in prison, to acquire or publish information on MİT activities.
- December 2014 amendments to the Penal and Criminal Procedure Codes made it possible to search persons or premises under simple “reasonable suspicion,” rather than “strong suspicion based on concrete evidence.” Police resorted to such grounds already in October, even before their actual approval, to raid the home of journalist Aytekin Gezici in Adana, after he had criticised the government on Twitter.
- August 2016, Turkey closed the Presidency of Telecommunication and Communication which had been tasked with regulation of censorship and surveillance orders since 2005. The transfer of executive powers to the Information and Communication Technologies Authority eliminated ministerial oversight of internet blocking orders as part of a wider set of reforms to introduce an executive presidency.

In June 2018, Esenyurt municipality in Istanbul has taken down Arabic shop signs, citing a new regulation stipulating that shop signs must include at least 75 percent Turkish words. Esenyurt had one of the highest populations of Syrian refugees in Istanbul after the start of the Syrian civil war and many Syrian businesses started to pop up.

On 14 October 2022, the parliament of Turkey adopted a legislative proposal that adds a new article, Article 217/A, to the Turkish Penal Code. Under the title Halkı yanıltıcı bilgiyi alenen yayma suçu ("Crime of publicly spreading misleading information"), the article sets a penalty of imprisonment for up to three years for publicly disseminating false information in a way that is "suitable for disrupting the public peace" for the purpose of creating "anxiety, fear or panic". Critics have pointed out that the law contains no clear definition of "false" or "misleading" information, opening the door to further abuse by courts to crack down on dissent. As formulated by a coalition of twenty-two international media freedom organizations, the bill "provides a framework for extensive censorship of online information and the criminalisation of journalism, which will enable the government to further subdue and control public debate in the lead up to Turkey's general elections in 2023".

== ECHR oversight ==
Turkey is one of the Council of Europe member states with the greatest number of ECHR-recognised violations of rights included in the European Convention on Human Rights. Of these, several concern Article 10 of the convention, on freedom of expression.

- The Tanıyan v. Turkey case (no. 29910/96) concerned the confiscation orders were issued for 117 of the 126 issues of the Yeni Politika daily published in 1995, either under the Prevention of Terrorism Act or under Article 312 of the Criminal Code. The Turkish government struck a friendly settlement with Necati Tanıyan in 2005, paying EUR 7,710 in damages and recognising the "interference" and the need "to ensure that the amended Article 312 will be applied in accordance with the requirements of Article 10 of the Convention as interpreted in the Court's case-law".
- The Halis Doğan et al. v. Turkey case (no. 50693/99) concerned 6 journalists (including Ragıp Zarakolu) who worked for the Turkish daily newspaper Özgür Bakış. The newspaper was banned from the provinces of south-east Anatolia (OHAL) in which a state of emergency had been declared on 7 May 1999. The ECHR struck the decision as unmotivated, arbitrary, and lacking a mechanism of judicial appeal.
- The Demirel and Ateş v. Turkey case (no. 10037/03 and 14813/03), concerned the editor and owner of the weekly newspaper Yedinci Gündem (Seventh Order of the Day), twice fined in 2002 for publishing statements and an interview with members of the PKK (Workers’ Party of Kurdistan). The paper was also temporarily closed down. The ECHR condemned Turkey in 2007, as the controversial contents did not incite violence or constitute hate speech.
- The Ürper and Others v. Turkey cases (2007) concerned 26 Turkish citizens, either owners or directors and journalists of four daily newspapers (Ülkede Özgür Gündem, Gündem, Güncel and Gerçek Demokrasi) which were repeatedly suspended for up to one month each between November 2006 and October 2007, as being considered PKK propaganda outlets. The applicants were also criminally prosecuted. The ECHR in 2009 condemned the suspension of future publications based on assumptions as an unjustifiable restriction to press freedom.
- Özgür Gündem case (2000): Özgür Gündem is a pro- Kurdish and leftist media outlet based in Istanbul. From the beginning of the ‘90's, the newspaper has been subject to raids and legal actions, with many journalists being arrested and even killed. The paper remained closed from 1994 to 2011 due to a court order. These facts were the bases for the Özgür Gündem v. Turkey case before the ECtHR. The applicants claimed that “the Turkish authorities had, directly or indirectly, sought to hinder, prevent and render impossible the production of Özgür Gündem by the encouragement of or acquiescence in unlawful killings and forced disappearances, by harassment and intimidation of journalists and distributors, and by failure to provide any or any adequate protection for journalists and distributors when their lives were clearly in danger and despite requests for such protection”. Concerning the police operation at the Özgür Gündem premises in Istanbul on December 10, 1993, and concerning the legal measures taken in respect of issues of the newspaper, the Strasbourg Court found that there was a breach of Article 10 ECHR.
- Fırat (Hrant) Dink v. Turkey (2010): Dink was a Turkish- Armenian journalist writing for the newspaper Agos. Between 2003 and 2004 he wrote a series of articles about the identity of Turkish citizens with Armenian origins. He was charged under Article 301 in 2006 and received a six-month suspended sentence of imprisonment. This verdict did not respect the principle, stated in the official comment to the 2008 of Article 301, that a single word or expression cannot justify the resort to criminal law. In June 2007, he was murdered by a nationalist. The European Strasbourg Court (ECtHR) considered the verdict lacking of any “pressing social need” and - together with the authorities‟ failure to protect Dink against attacks of extreme nationalist groups - Turkey's “positive obligations” regarding Dink's freedom expression had not been complied with.
- Ahmet Yildirim v. Turkey (2013): it concerns the Internet Law No. 5651 and the blocking of “Google Sites”, defamation, the usage of disproportionate measures and the need for restrictions to be prescribed by law.

== Attacks and threats against journalists ==
=== Physical attacks and assassinations of journalists ===
The physical safety of journalists in Turkey is at risk.

Several journalists died in the 1990s at the height of the Kurdish–Turkish conflict. Soon after the pro-Kurdish press had started to publish the first daily newspaper by the name of "Özgür Gündem" (Free Agenda) killings of Kurdish journalists started. Hardly any of them have been clarified or resulted in sanctions for the assailants. "Murder by unknown assailants" (tr: faili meçhul) is the term used in Turkish to indicate that the perpetrators were not identified because of them being protected by the State and cases of disappearance. The list of names of distributors of Özgür Gündem and its successors that were killed (while the perpetrators mostly remained unknown) includes 18 names. Among the 33 journalists that were killed between 1990 and 1995, most were working for the so-called Kurdish Free Press.

The killings of journalists in Turkey since 1995 are more or less individual cases. Most prominent among the victims is Hrant Dink, killed in 2007, but the death of Metin Göktepe also raised great concern, since police officers beat him to death. The death of Metin Alataş in 2010 is also a source of disagreement: though the autopsy claimed it was suicide, his family and colleagues demanded an investigation. He had formerly received death threats and had been violently assaulted. Since 2014, several Syrian journalists who were working from Turkey and reporting on the rise of Daesh have been assassinated.

In 2014, journalists suffered obstruction, tear gas injuries, and physical assault by the police while covering several major protests: the February protests against internet censorship; the May Day demonstrations; and the Gezi Park protests anniversaries (when CNN correspondent Ivan Watson was shortly detained and physically mistreated). Turkish security forces fired tear gas at journalists reporting from the border close to the Syrian town of Kobane in October.

- The CPJ counted one media-related killing in 2014, the one of Kadir Bağdu who was shot in Adana while delivering the pro-Kurdish daily Azadiya Welat.
- The general secretary of the Turkish Journalists’ Union, Mustafa Kuleli, as well as journalist Hasan Cömert, were attacked in February 2014 by unknown assailants.
- The journalist Mithat Fabian Sözmen had to seek medical care after a physical attack in March 2014.

=== Arrests of journalists ===
Despite the 2004 Press Law only foreseeing fines, other restrictive laws have led to several journalists and writers being put behind bars. According to a report published by the Committee to Protect Journalists (CPJ), at least seven journalists remained in prison by the end of 2014. The independent Turkish press agency Bianet counted 22 journalists and 10 publishers in jail - most of them Kurds, charged with association with an illegal organisation.

In 2016, Turkey became the country with the highest population of jailed journalists. As to the committee to Protect Journalists (CPJ) rank, Turkey was the first country ever to jail 81 journalists, editors and media practitioners in one year.

According to a CPJ report, Turkish authorities are engaging in widespread criminal prosecution and jailing of journalists, and are applying other forms of severe pressure to encourage self-censorship in the press. The CPJ found that this pressure takes the form of highly repressive laws, particularly in the penal code and anti-terror law; a criminal procedure code that greatly favors the state; and a harsh anti-press tone set at the highest levels of government. Turkey's press freedom situation has reached a crisis point. This reports mentions 3 types of journalists targeted :

- Investigative and critical reporters: victims of the anti-state prosecutions: The government's broad inquiry into the Ergenekon plot ensnared investigative reporters. But the evidence, rather than revealing conspirators, points to a government intent on punishing critical reporters.
- Kurdish journalists: Turkish authorities conflate support for the Kurdish cause with terrorism itself. When it comes to Kurdish journalists, newsgathering activities such as fielding tips, covering protests, and conducting interviews are evidence of a crime.
- Collateral damages of the general assault on the press: The authorities are waging one of the world's biggest anti-press campaigns in recent history. Dozens of writers and editors are in prison, nearly all on terrorism or other anti-state charges.

Kemalist and/or nationalist journalists were arrested on charges referring to the Ergenekon case and several left-wing and Kurdish journalists were arrested on charges of engaging in propaganda for the PKK listed as a terrorist organization. In short, writing an article or making a speech can still lead to a court case and a long prison sentence for membership or leadership of a terrorist organisation. Together with possible pressure on the press by state officials and possible firing of critical journalists, this situation can lead to a widespread self-censorship.

In November 2013, three journalists were sentenced to life in prison as senior members of the illegal Marxist–Leninist Communist Party - among them the founder of Özgür Radio, Füsun Erdoğan. They had been arrested in 2006 and held until 2014, when they were released following legal reforms on pre-trial detention terms. An appeal is still pending.

In February 2017, German-Turkish journalist Deniz Yücel was jailed in Istanbul.

On April 10, 2017, the Italian journalist Gabriele Del Grande was arrested in Hatay and jailed in Mugla. He was in Turkey in order to write a book on the war in Syria. He went on hunger strike on April 18, 2017 and was freed six days later, on April 24, 2017.

=== Judicial prosecution ===
Defamation and libel remain criminal charges in Turkey. They often result in fines and jail terms. Bianet counted 10 journalists convicted of defamation, blasphemy or incitement to hatred in 2014.

Courts' activities on media-related cases, particularly those concerning the corruption scandals surrounding Erdoğan and his close circle, have cast doubts on the independence and impartiality of the judiciary in Turkey. The Turkish Journalists' Association and the Turkish Journalists' Union counted 60 new journalists under prosecution for this single issue in 2013, for a total number of over 100 lawsuits.

- In January 2009 Adnan Demir, editor of the provocative newspaper Taraf, was charged with divulging secret military information, under Article 336 of the Turkish Criminal Code. He was accused of having published an article in October 2008 that alleged police and military had been warned of an imminent PKK attack that same month, an attack which resulted in the death of 13 soldiers. Demir faces up to 5 years of prison. On 29 December 2009 İstanbul Heavy Penal Court No. 13 acquitted Adnan Demir.
- In February 2014, author İhsan Eliaçık was condemned for defamation, after being sued by the Presidency for comments on Twitter during the Gezi Park protests of 2013.
- In April 2014 the columnist Önder Aytaç was condemned to 10 months in jail for “insulting public officials” for a tweet about Erdoğan. Aytaç claimed the tweet included a typo.
- The Cumhuriyet columnist Can Dündar was sued for defamation by Erdoğan in May 2014 for an article he had written in April. He received CPJ's International Press Freedom Award in 2016.
- In August 2014, the Taraf columnist Mehmet Baransu was briefly arrested for defamation after criticizing the authorities, and faced the risk of a long jail sentence in a separate case for allegedly publishing documents concerning a classified meeting in 2004.
- In September 2014 the writer, journalist, and publisher Erol Özkoray was condemned to 11 months and 20 days (with suspended sentence) for defamation against Erdoğan in a book he had authored about the Gezi Park protests.

=== Denial of accreditation and deportation of foreign journalists ===
- In January 2014 the Azerbaijani journalist Mahir Zeynalov was deported after being sued by the President for posting links on Twitter to articles on a corruption scandal.
- In September 2015, Turkey deported three foreign journalists in Diyarbakır, who were reporting on Turkey's Kurdish issue. Two British Vice News journalists, reporter Jake Hanrahan and photojournalist Philip Pendlebury, were detained on 27 August and then deported on 2 September. Mohammed Ismael Rasool, a Turkish citizen who was with the British team as a fixer, was detained, questioned and faced further legal repercussions. They were reporting on the Turkish government's conflict with the Kurdistan Workers' Party (PKK).
- One week later, Dutch journalist Fréderike Geerdink, who was known for being the only foreign reporter based in Diyarbakır and focusing on Kurdish issues, was deported by Turkish authorities following her second arrest in 2015. Geerdink, a freelance reporter whose contributions appeared regularly in Dikan, had written a book about the Turkish strike that resulted in the Roboski massacre of Kurds, which was published in 2014 but released in English in 2015.
- Rauf Mirkadirov, Azerbaijani correspondent from Ankara for Ayna and Zerkalo, was extradited to Azerbaijan without access to a lawyer. He was then charged with espionage by the Azerbaijani authorities. Mirkadirov had written accounts that were critical of both governments.

=== Hostile public rhetoric and smear campaigns ===
Particularly since 2013, the President Erdoğan and other governmental officials have resorted to hostile public rhetoric against independent journalists and media outlets, which is then echoed in the pro-governmental press and TV, accusing foreign media and interest groups of conspiring to bring down his government.

- The Economist correspondent, Amberin Zaman, was publicly denounced as a "shameless militant" by Erdoğan at a pre-electoral rally in August 2014. Erdoğan tried to intimidate her by telling her to "know [her] place". She was then subjected to a deluge of abuse and threats on social media by AKP supporters in the following months.
- In September 2014 The New York Times reporter Ceylan Yeğinsu was publicly smeared and depicted as a traitor for a photograph caption in a reportage on ISIS recruitment in Turkey. The U.S. State Department criticized Turkey for such intimidation attempts.

=== Arbitrary denial of access ===
Turkish authorities have been reported as denying access to events and information to journalists for political reasons.

- In December 2013, after the press had unveiled an alleged corruption scandal involving top government officials, the police department announced the closure of two press rooms in Istanbul and declared that journalists would not be allowed to enter police facilities unless strictly for formal press conferences.
- 2014 saw a worsening of discriminatory accreditation policies. AKP meetings were off-limits for critical journalists. In case of visits abroad, foreign officials had to hold separate press conferences to allow unaccredited media correspondents.

== Government control over the media ==
Since 2011, the AKP government has increased restrictions on freedom of speech, freedom of the press and internet use, and television content, as well as the right to free assembly. It has also developed links with media groups, and used administrative and legal measures (including, in one case, a billion tax fine) against critical media groups and critical journalists: "over the last decade the AKP has built an informal, powerful, coalition of party-affiliated businessmen and media outlets whose livelihoods depend on the political order that Erdoğan is constructing. Those who resist do so at their own risk."

These behaviours became particularly prominent in 2013 in the context of the Turkish media coverage of the Gezi Park protests. The BBC noted that while some outlets are aligned with the AKP or are personally close to Erdoğan, "most mainstream media outlets - such as TV news channels HaberTurk and NTV, and the major centrist daily Milliyet - are loth to irritate the government because their owners' business interests at times rely on government support. All of these have tended to steer clear of covering the demonstrations." Few channels provided live coverage – one that did was Halk TV. Several private media outlets were reported as engaging in self-censorship due to political pressures. The 2014 local and presidential elections exposed the extent of biased coverage by pro-government media.

=== Direct control over state media ===
The state-run Anadolu Agency and the Turkish Radio and Television Corporation (TRT) have also been criticized by media outlets and opposition parties, for acting more and more like a mouthpiece for the ruling AKP, a stance in stark violation of their requirement as public institutions to report and serve the public in an objective way.

In 2014, the TRT, the state broadcaster, as well as the state-owned Anadolu Agency, were subject to stricter controls. Even RTÜK warned TRT for disproportionate coverage of the AKP; the Supreme Board of Elections fined the public broadcaster for not reporting at all on presidential candidates other than Erdoğan, between August 6 and 8. The Council of Europe observers reported concern about the unfair media advantage for the incumbent ruling party.

=== Pro-governmental "Pool Media" ===
During its 12-year rule, the ruling AKP has gradually expanded its control over media. Today, numerous newspapers, TV channels and internet portals also dubbed as Yandaş Medya ("Partisan Media") or Havuz Medyası ("Pool Media") continue their heavy pro-government propaganda. Several media groups receive preferential treatment in exchange for AKP-friendly editorial policies. Some of these media organizations were acquired by AKP-friendly businesses through questionable funds and processes.

Leaked telephone calls between high ranking AKP officials and businessmen indicate that government officials collected money from businessmen in order to create a "pool media" that will support AKP government at any cost. Arbitrary tax penalties are assessed to force newspapers into bankruptcy—after which they emerge, owned by friends of the president. According to an investigation by Bloomberg, Erdoğan forced a sale of the once independent daily Sabah to a consortium of businessmen led by his son-in-law.

=== Direct pressures and self-censorship of major media outlets ===
Major media outlets in Turkey belong to certain group of influential businessman or holdings. In nearly all cases, these holding companies earn only a small fraction of their revenue from their media outlets, with the bulk of profits coming from other interests, such as construction, mining, finance, or energy. Therefore, media groups usually practice self-censorship to protect their wider business interests.

Media not friendly to the AKP are threatened with intimidation, inspections and fines. These media group owners face similar threats to their other businesses. An increasing number of columnists have been fired for criticizing the AKP leadership.

In addition to the censorship practiced by pro-government media such as Sabah, Yeni Şafak, and Star, the majority of other newspapers, such as Sözcü, Zaman, Milliyet, and Radikal have been reported as practicing self-censorship to protect their business interests and using the market share (65% of the total newspapers sold daily in Turkey as opposed to pro-government media) to avoid retaliatory action by the AKP government of Recep Tayyip Erdoğan.

During the period before the Turkish local elections of 2014, a number of phone calls between prime minister Recep Tayyip Erdoğan and media executives were leaked to the internet. Most of the recordings were between Erdoğan and Habertürk newspaper & TV channel executive Fatih Saraç. In those recordings, it can be heard that Erdoğan was calling Fatih Saraç when he was unhappy about a news item published in the newspaper or broadcast on TV. He was demanding Fatih Saraç to be careful next time or censor any particular topics he is not happy about. At another leaked call, Erdoğan gets very upset and angry over a news published at Milliyet newspaper and reacts harshly to Erdoğan Demirören, owner of the newspaper. Later, it can be heard that Demirören is reduced to tears. During a call between Erdoğan and editor-in-chief of Star daily Mustafa Karaalioğlu, Erdoğan lashes out at Karaalioğlu for allowing Mehmet Altan to continue writing such critical opinions about a speech the prime minister had delivered recently. In the second conversation, Erdoğan is heard grilling Karaalioğlu over his insistence on keeping Hidayet Şefkatli Tuksal, a female columnist in the paper despite her critical expressions about him. Later, both Altan and Tuksal got fired from Star newspaper. Erdoğan acknowledged that he called media executives.

In 2014, direct pressures from the executive and the Presidency have led to the dismissal of media workers for their critical articles. Bianet records over 339 journalists and media workers being laid off or forced to quit in the year - several of them due to political pressures.

- In August 2014 Enis Berberoğlu, the editor-in-chief of Hürriyet newspaper, quit the paper right before the 2014 Turkish presidential election. It has been reported that he was forced to resign after a clash with the publishing company Doğan Holding, due to Berberoğlu's refusal to fire a columnist. The day before, Erdoğan had publicly criticized the Doğan group. Hürriyet denied pressures related to the case.

=== Prosecution of journalists and closure of media ===
- The headquarters of Nokta, an investigative magazine which has since been closed because of military pressures, were searched by police in April 2007, following the publication of articles examining alleged links between the Office of the Chief of Staff and some NGOs, and questioning the military's connection to officially civilian anti-government rallies. The magazine also gave details on military blacklistings of journalists, as well as two plans for a military coup, by retired generals, aiming to overthrow the AKP government in 2004. Nokta had also revealed military accreditations for press organs, deciding to whom the military should provide information.Alper Görmüş, editor of Nokta, was charged with insult and libel (under articles 267 and 125 of the Turkish Penal Code, TPC), and faced a possible prison sentence of over six years, for publishing the excerpts of the alleged journal of Naval Commander Örnek in the magazine's March 29, 2007 issue. Nokta journalist Ahmet Şık and defense expert journalist Lale Sarıibrahimoğlu were also indicted on May 7, 2007, under Article 301 for "insulting the armed forces" in connection with an interview Şık conducted with Sarıibrahimoğlu.
- Prosecution of media workers suspected to be linked with the Group of Communities in Kurdistan, alleged urban branch of the PKK, led to over 46 journalists being arrested as allegedly part of the "press wing" of the group in 2011. Most of them were released pending the trial under antiterrorism laws. Among them were the owner of Belge Publishing House, Ragıp Zarakolu, and his son Deniz, editor at Belge. Ragıp was released in April 2012, and Deniz in March 2014, both pending trial.
- The Committee To Protect Journalists reported that in 2012 Turkey had more journalists in custody than any other country in the world.
- In 2013, the opposition in Turkey claimed that dozens of journalists had been forced from their jobs for covering antigovernment protests.
- In 2014, media outlets were raided and journalists jailed in connection with the governmental crackdown on the Gülen movement, a former ally of Erdoğan, now disgraced. On 14 December 2014 authorities searched the premises of the Zaman newspaper and arrested several media workers, including the editor in chief Ekrem Dumanlı, as well as Hidayet Karaca, general manager of the Samanyolu Media Group, and charged them with “establishing and managing an armed terror organization” to reverse state power. Most journalists were released in the following days, pending trial.
- The pattern of judicial harassment also extends to journalists living in exile. Investigative reporter Adem Yavuz Arslan, for instance, faced an extradition request from the United States and had his passport revoked after the closure of Bugün TV, where he had worked. He is being tried in absentia, with prosecutors seeking a life sentence based on his books and articles.
- In 2015, the news magazine Nokta, known for its critical stance toward the government, faced severe judicial pressure. The magazine's Editor-in-Chief, Cevheri Güven, was arrested on November 3, 2015, following a cover story that authorities claimed incited an armed uprising. Güven and the magazine's managing editor were detained for 58 days before being conditionally released. In May 2017, an Istanbul court sentenced Güven in absentia to 22.5 years in prison for "attempting to instigate a civil war." Following the sentencing, Güven fled Turkey and settled in Germany. In December 2021, all of his assets in Turkey were frozen by an official decree.
- In November 2015 Can Dündar, editor of the prominent secularist Turkish newspaper Cumhuriyet, and Erdem Gül, the newspaper's capital correspondent in Ankara, were jailed facing life in prison. The prosecution stemmed from an article published with the headline "Here are the weapons Erdoğan claims to not exist‟ on May 29, 2015. The images were showing MIT (Millî İstihbarat Teşkilâtı, the Turkish National Intelligence Agency) tracks sending weapons to Syria. They were arrested for “Procuring information as to state security‟, "Political and military espionage‟, "Declaring confidential information‟ and "Propagandizing a terror organization‟. They were released on 26 February 2016, after the Turkish Constitutional Court ruled that their rights were violated during the pre-trial detention; the imprisonment lasted 92 days. On May 6, 2016, Istanbul's 14th Court for Serious Crimes convicted both Dündar and Gül for revealing state secrets that posed a threat to state security or to Turkey's domestic or foreign interests. Dündar was sentenced to seven years in prison, reduced to five years and 10 months; and Gül to six years, reduced to five, under Article 329 of the Turkish Penal Code.
- Reporters Without Borders said the arrests sent “an extremely grave signal about media freedom in Turkey.” This crackdown on the press, which has reached new levels in March 2016 with the seizure of opposition newspaper Zaman, one of Turkey's leading media outlets, has sparked widespread criticism inside Turkey as well as internationally. The New York-based Committee to Protect Journalists (CPJ) has declared that Press freedom in Turkey is "under siege". Jodie Ginsberg, the CEO of Index on Censorship, a campaigning organisation for freedom of expression, has declared that "Turkey's assault on press freedom is the act of a dictatorship, not a democracy".
- In the course of the 2016 Turkish purges, the licenses of 24 radio and television channels and the press cards of 34 journalists accused of being linked to Gülen were revoked. Two people were arrested for praising the coup attempt and insulting President Erdoğan on social media. On 25 July, Nazlı Ilıcak was taken into custody.
- On 27 July 2016, President Recep Tayyip Erdoğan shut down 16 television channels, 23 radio stations, 45 daily newspapers, 15 magazines and 29 publishing houses in another emergency decree under the newly adopted emergency legislation. The closed outlets notably include Gülen-affiliated Cihan News Agency, Samanyolu TV and the previously leading newspaper Zaman (including its English-language version Today's Zaman), but also the opposition daily newspaper Taraf which was known to be in close relations with the Gulen Movement. Since Zaman's seizure, the newspaper radically changed its editorial policy.
- In late October 2016, Turkish authorities shut down 15 media outlets, including one of the world's only women's news agencies, and detained the editor-in-chief of the prominent secularist Turkish newspaper Cumhuriyet, "on accusations that they committed crimes on behalf of Kurdish militants and a network linked to the US-based cleric Fethullah Gülen".

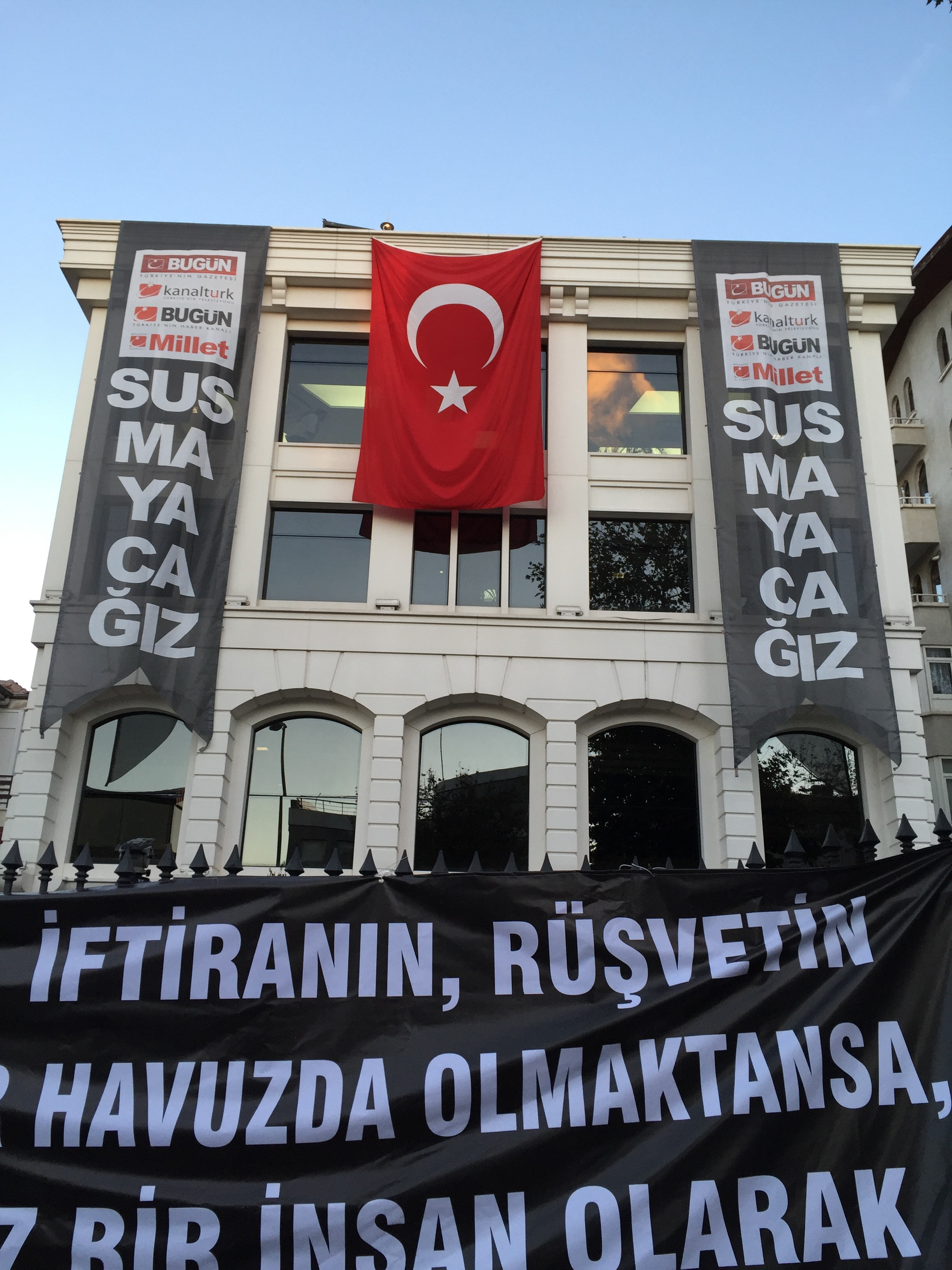
Protest banners at the headquarters of raided media company Koza İpek

=== Government seizure of independent media companies ===
- On 26 October 2015, just a few days before the November 1 general elections, Koza İpek Holding was placed under a panel of mainly pro-government trustees. The company's media assets include two daily newspapers, Bugün and Millet (gazeta), and two TV/radio stations, Bugün TV and Kanaltürk TV. İpek Media Group was closed on 29 February 2016.
- On 4 March 2016, the opposition newspaper Zaman was likewise placed under a panel of government-aligned trustees. On 8 March 2016, Cihan News Agency, which was also owned by Feza Publications, placed under trustees like Zaman.
- As to January 18, 2017, more than 150 media outlets were closed and their assets liquidated by governmental decrees. Under emergency decree No. 687 of February 9, 2017, Turkey's Saving Deposit Insurance Fund (TMSF) will be authorized to sell companies seized by the state through the appointment of trustees. Also, through the use of emergency decrees- such as Nos. 668 (July 27, 2016), 675 (October 29, 2016) and 677 (November 22, 2016), 178 media organizations were closed down being charged of having terrorist affiliations. As to November 2016, Twenty-four of these shut-down media organizations were radio stations, twenty- eight televisions, eighty newspapers.

=== Removing channels from government-controlled TV satellites ===
Türksat is the sole communications satellite operator in Turkey. There have been allegations that TV channels critical of the AKP party and President Erdoğan have been removed from Türksat's infrastructure, and that Türksat's executive board is dominated by pro-Erdoğan figures.

In October 2015 a video recording emerged of a 2 February 2015 conversation between Mustafa Varank, advisor to President Erdoğan and board member of Türksat, and some journalists in which Varank states that he had urged Türksat to drop certain TV channels because "they are airing reports that harm the government's prestige". Later that year the TV channels Irmak TV, Bugün TV, and Kanaltürk, known for their critical stance against the government, were notified by Türksat that their contracts would not be renewed as of November 2015, and were told to remove their platforms from Türksat's infrastructure.

Türksat dropped TV channels critical of the government from its platform in November 2015. The broadcasting of TV stations—including Samanyolu TV, Mehtap TV, S Haber and Radio Cihan—that are critical of the ruling AKP government were halted by Türksat because of a “legal obligation” to the order of a prosecutor's office, based on the suspicion that the channels are supporting a terrorist organization. Among the TV and radio stations removed were Samanyolu Europe, Ebru TV, Mehtap TV, Samanyolu Haber, Irmak TV, Yumurcak TV, Dünya TV, MC TV, Samanyolu Africa, Tuna Shopping TV, Burç FM, Samanyolu Haber Radio, Mehtap Radio and Radio Cihan.

The critical Bugün and Kanaltürk TV channels, which were seized by a government-initiated move in October 2015, were also dropped from Türksat in November 2015. Later on 1 March 2016 these two seized channels closed due to financial reasons by government trustees.

In March 2016 the two TV channels from other wings of the politics were also removed from Türksat, namely, Turkish Nationalist Benguturk and Kurdish Nationalist IMC TV.

On 25 September 2017, Turkey decided to remove broadcaster Rudaw, which is affiliated to the Kurdistan Region, from its satellite broadcasting on the same day voting took place on an independence referendum in the KRG.

== Censorship of the media ==
Censorship of sensitive topics in Turkey happens both online and offline. Kurdish issues, the Armenian genocide, as well as subjects controversial for Islam or the Turkish state are often censored. Enforcement remains arbitrary and unpredictable. Also, defamation of the Head of the State is a crime provision increasingly used for censoring critical voices in Turkey.

In the 2026 Reporters Without Borders World Press Freedom Index, Turkey is ranked in the 163rd place out of 180 countries. The situation for free expression has always been troubled in Turkey. The situation dramatically deteriorated after the 2013 Gezi protests, reaching its peak after the 15 July 2016 coup attempt. From that moment on, a state of emergency is in force, tens of thousand of journalists, academics, public officials and intellectuals have been arrested or charged, mainly with terrorist charges, sometimes following some statement or writing of them.

The Council of Europe Commissioner for Human Rights' report on freedom of expression and media freedom in Turkey, after his 2016 visits to Turkey, noted that the violations to freedom of expression in Turkey have created a distinct chilling effect, manifesting in self- censorship both among the remaining media and among ordinary citizens. In addition, the Commissioner wrote that the main obstacle to an improvement of the situation of freedom of expression and media freedom in Turkey is the lack of political will both to acknowledge and to address such problems.

=== Reporting bans and gag orders ===
In 2017, the Council of Europe Commissioner for Human Rights noted that with regard to judicial harassment restricting freedom of expression the main issues consist in:

- Backsliding in the case-law of the Turkish judiciary;
- Issues related to the independence of the judiciary and of the judicial culture;
- Defamation remains a criminal offence and causes dangerous chilling effects, in particular defamation of the President of the Republic and of public officials;
- Harassment restricted the parliamentary debate, after the lift of the immunity of parliamentarians. Most of the opposition HD Party MPs are under investigations, if not in prison;
- Great restrictions of academic freedoms: many academics were dismissed, forced to resign, suspended or taken into police custody;
- Harassment involves all sectors of Turkish society, e.g. human rights defenders. There are frequent impositions of media bans or blackouts concerning events of clear public interest and an excessive use of detention on remand.

As to January 18, 2017, more than 150 media outlets were closed and their assets liquidated by governmental decrees. Under emergency decree No. 687 of February 9, 2017, Turkey's Saving Deposit Insurance Fund (TMSF) will be authorized to sell companies seized by the state through the appointment of trustees. Also, through the use of emergency decrees- such as Nos. 668 (July 27, 2016), 675 (October 29, 2016) and 677 (November 22, 2016), 178 media organizations were closed down being charged of having terrorist affiliations. As to November 2016, Twenty-four of these shut-down media organizations were radio stations, twenty- eight televisions, eighty newspapers.

In 2014, Turkish regulators issued several reporting bans on public interest issues.

- In February 2014 it was forbidden to report on allegations of MİT involvement in the transfer of weapons to Syria.
- In March 2014 leaked audio recordings of a national security meeting at the Foreign Ministry were put under gag order.
- In May 2014 the Radio and Television Supreme Council (RTÜK) warned broadcasters to refrain from showing materials deemed “disrespectful to feelings of the families of victims” after the Soma mine disaster. The country worst mining disaster, causing 301 deaths, remained absent from most mainstream media outlets.
- In June 2014 a reporting ban was issued concerning the kidnapping by ISIL of 49 Turkish citizens from the Turkish consulate in Mosul, Iraq.
- In November 2014 a court in Ankara issued an unprecedented reporting ban on a parliamentary inquiry into corruption allegations concerning four former ministers.
- In September 2014 the premises of the online newspapers Gri Hat and Karşı Gazete were raided and searched by police after they had published information on the alleged corruption scandal. The police demanded the removal of online information, despite only having a search warrant.

In 2012, as part of the Third Reform Package, all previous bans on publications were cancelled unless renewed by court - which happened for most leftist and Kurdish publications.

Academics are also affected by government's censorship. In this regard, the case of the Academics for Peace is particularly relevant: on January 14, 2016, 27 academics were detained for interrogations after having signed a petition with more than other 1.000 people asking for peace in the south-east of the country, where there are ongoing violent clashes between the Turkish army and the PKK.

=== Broadcasting ===
In television broadcasts, scenes displaying nudity, consumption of alcohol, smoking, drug usage, violence and improper display of designer clothes logo, brand names of food and drink and also street signages of the name of establishment are commonly censored by blurring out or cut respective areas and scenes. TV channels also practice self-censorship of subtitles in order to avoid heavy fines from the Radio and Television Supreme Council (Radyo ve Televizyon Üst Kurulu, RTÜK). For example, CNBC-e channel usually translates the word “gay” as “marginal“.

State agency RTÜK continues to impose a large number of closure orders on TV and radio stations on the grounds that they have made separatist broadcasts.

- In 2000, television channels were instructed that they would be suspended for a day if they aired the music video for ‘Kuşu Kalkmaz’, a single from Sultana's debut album ‘Çerkez Kızı’.
- In 2001, South Park was banned for 1 year in Turkey because God was shown as a rat.
- In August 2001, RTÜK banned the BBC World Service and the Deutsche Welle on the grounds that their broadcasts "threatened national security." A ban on broadcasting in Kurdish was lifted with certain qualifications in 2001 and 2002.
- Early in 2007, the Turkish government banned a popular television series called Valley of the Wolves: Terror, citing the show's violent themes. The TV show inspired a Turkish-made movie by the same name, which included American actor Gary Busey. Busey played an American doctor who removed organs from Iraqi prisoners at the infamous Abu Ghraib prison and sold the harvested organs on the black market. The movie was pulled from theaters in the United States after the Anti-Defamation League complained to the Turkish ambassador to the U.S. about the movie's portrayal of Jews.
- In 2013, a private television channel was fined $30,000 for insulting religious values over an episode of The Simpsons in which God was shown taking orders from the devil.

=== Print ===
- Özgür Gündem case (1993–2016): Özgür Gündem is a pro-Kurdish and leftist media outlet based in Istanbul. From the beginning of the ‘90's, the newspaper has been subject to raids and legal actions, with many journalists being arrested and even killed. The paper remained closed from 1994 to 2011 due to a court order. These facts were the bases for the Özgür Gündem v. Turkey case before the ECtHR. On August 16, 2016, there was another raid by Turkish police inside the newspaper and a court ordered its interim closure for "continuously making propaganda for Kurdistan Workers' Party (PKK)" and "acting as if it is a publication of the armed terror organisation". Twenty-four Gündem's journalists were arrested and kept in precautionary detention. Only considering July 2016, the Özgür Gündem's website was blocked twice, first on the 1st and then on the 26th.

== Censorship of works of art ==
- In 1935, Turkey blocked a German film production about the Ottoman sultan Abdülhamid II, because the film would show the "sensational harem life".
- In light of rising political tension in the country, Cem Karaca was forced to flee to Germany in 1979 to avoid prosecution for his politically charged and distinctly left leaning lyrics often calling for social justice and anti-corruption. Following the 1980 military coup, a warrant for his arrest was issued. His repeated refusal to return to Turkey resulted in his citizenship being revoked on 6 January 1983. It was not until 1987 that he was pardoned and was able to return to Turkey.
- Selda Bağcan was arrested and jailed three times following 1980 Turkish coup d'état for singing in Kurdish and the inclusion of banned poems of Nazım Hikmet within her lyrics. She was imprisoned for almost 5 months between 1981 and 1984 for charges relating to her songs' lyrics.
- In June 2006, police seized a collage by British artist Michael Dickinson — which showed the then Turkish Prime Minister Recep Tayyip Erdoğan as a dog being given a rosette by President Bush — and told him he would be prosecuted. Charles Thomson, leader of the Stuckism movement, of which Dickinson is a member, wrote to then UK Prime Minister, Tony Blair in protest. The Times commented: "The case could greatly embarrass Turkey and Britain, for it raises questions about Turkey's human rights record as it seeks EU membership, with Tony Blair's backing." The prosecutor declined to present a case, until Dickinson then displayed another similar collage outside the court. He was then held for ten days and told he would be prosecuted for "insulting the Prime Minister's dignity". In September 2008, he was acquitted, the judge ruling that "insulting elements" were "within the limits of criticism". Dickinson said, "I am lucky to be acquitted. There are still artists in Turkey facing prosecution and being sentenced for their opinions."
- In 2016, the director of the Dresdner Sinfoniker orchestra claimed Turkey's delegation to the European Union demanded the European Commission withdraw 200,000 euros in funding for a concert which will use the term “genocide” in texts sung and spoken during a planned show.
- In 2016, three separate concerts by Sıla due to take place in Istanbul and Bursa were cancelled by the local municipalities following the artists remarks regarding the then upcoming anti-coup Yenikapı Rally, held as response to the failed coup attempt in 2016. The Istanbul Metropolitan Municipality stated that the concerts due to take place in the Cemil Topuzlu Open-Air Theatre were cancelled as a result of Sıla's statement referring to the Yenikapı Rally as a "show" in which she would not take part.
- On 6 March 2017, Zehra Doğan was sentenced to 2 years and 9 months of detention for “separatist propaganda”, following a drawing of her shared on Twitter representing the Nusaybin curfew, in the South- East of Turkey.
- Before the 2017 Turkish constitutional referendum which would authorise changes to the Turkish constitution to increase the power of the president, a Turkish court banned a pro-Kurdish Peoples' Democratic Party (HDP) song which supported the "No" on the grounds that it contravened the constitution and fomented hatred.
- The Turkish Radio and Television Corporation (TRT) banned the broadcasting of 208 songs in 2018 on grounds of immorality and promoting terrorism. The latter reason was linked primarily to Kurdish songs, and TRT later described "immoral" content in a tweet as containing alcohol and tobacco consumption.
- In 2018, Turkey's top media watchdog, the Radio and Television Supreme Council (RTÜK), reviewed the English-language lyrics of pop songs, and issued fines after concluding that they were inappropriate. RTÜK issued a 17,065 Turkish Lira fine to the music channels NR1 and Dream TV due to the lyrics of "Wild Thoughts" and the same amount of fine to Power TV due to the lyrics of "Sex, Love & Water".

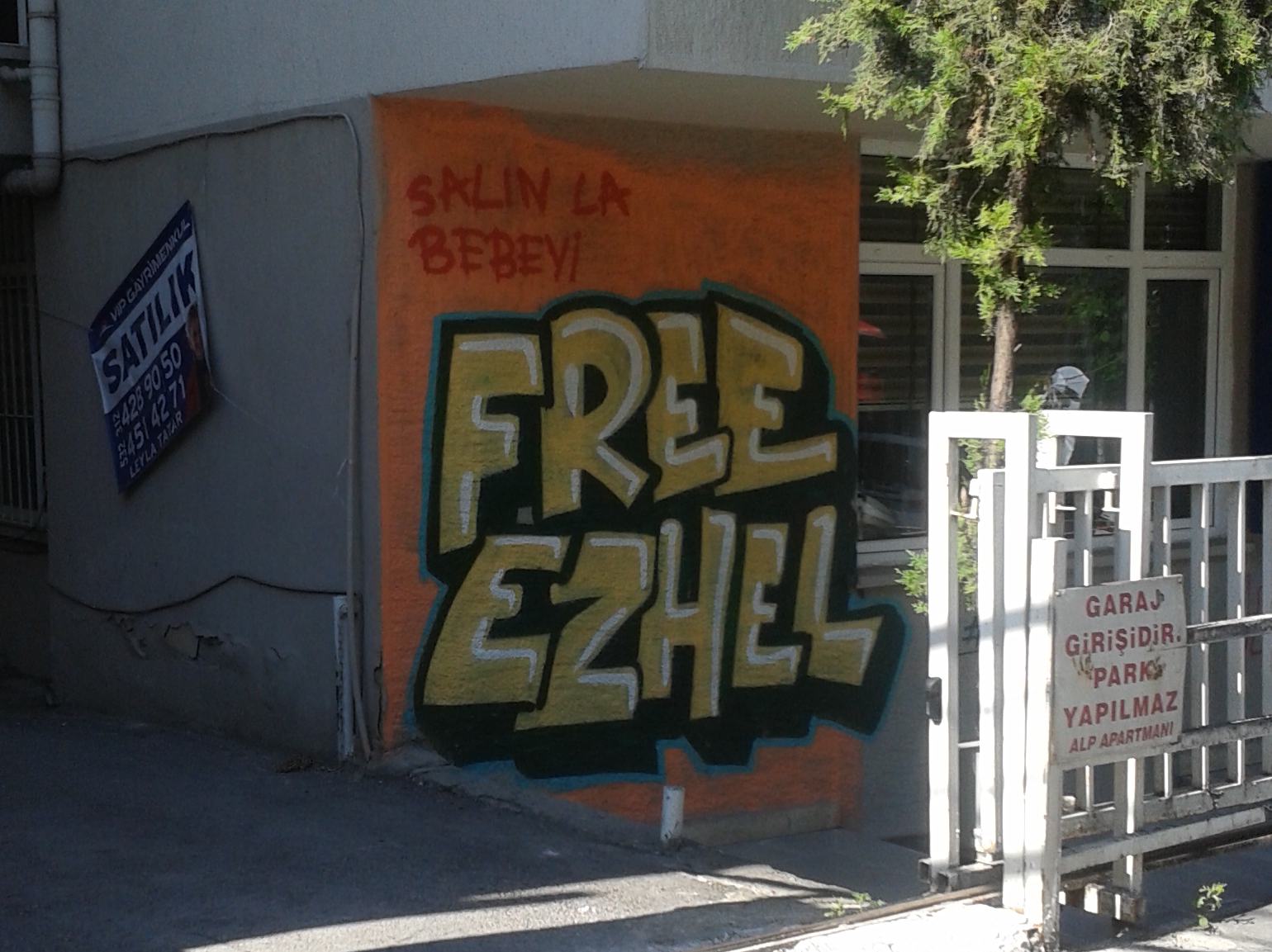
Graffiti in Ankara displaying the words "Free Ezhel" in reference to the artist's arrest and detention in May 2018.

- On 24 May 2018, Ezhel, was arrested on charges of encouraging drug use in relation to lyrics of his songs referencing marijuana consumption, facing up to 10 years in prison. This sparked national outrage, as some attributed the arrest to Ezhel being an outspoken critic of the government. He was acquitted on June 19, 2018.
- Burak Aydoğdu (stage name Burry Soprano) was arrested on October 1, 2018, and charged with 'encouraging drug use' through his hit song "Mary Jane", and later released pending trial. He was detained again and taken to Silivri Prison in March 2021 following a courts decision to sentence the artist to 4 years and 2 months in prison.
- In March 2021, four employees of the satirical French magazine Charlie Hebdo were indicted by the Ankara Chief Prosecutor's Office for allegedly "insulting the president" facing 4 years and 8 months in prison in relation to a cartoon that portrays president Recep Tayyip Erdoğan lifting the skirt of a woman in a veil.
- Stand-up comedian Emre Günsal was arrested on April 11, 2020, and sentenced to 3 years and 5 months of prison for his stand-up performance from earlier the same month which contained jokes on prominent historic figures such as Rumi, Shams Tabrizi and Atatürk.
- In May 2021, the Radio and Television Supreme Council (RTÜK) ordered the removal of "inappropriate content" from Spotify, primarily in reference to the range of podcasts available in Spotify's library. RTÜK went further to threaten the platform with censorship in the event of non-compliance with the order.
- Diamond Tema received death threats from individuals defending sharia law after discussing a hadith about Muhammad and Aisha on a YouTube program. Turkish Justice Minister Yılmaz Tunç made a statement on his X account. Tunç recalled that an official investigation was initiated by the Istanbul Chief Public Prosecutor's Office on charges of "openly inciting the public to hatred and hostility" due to the insulting, offensive, and provocative expressions used in the videos he shared on social media. Tunç stated that an arrest warrant was issued for Diamond Tema due to his presence in Albania. He said "Provocative, and offensive expressions about the religion of Islam and our beloved prophet can never be accepted".
- In February 2025, Turabi Çamkıran's song "Wine Me, Dine Me" was blocked from access due to its sexually explicit content.
- Deniz Göktaş was arrested on July 3, 2026 pending trial following the publication of his 2026 stand-up show. He was charged with "insulting the president" and "publicly inciting hatred or enmity" due to the contents of his show. He spent three months before his trial in October 2026. He was convicted and sentenced to 19 months, but was released and offered a chance to appeal the verdict.

== Censorship of films and plays ==
- Sex and the City 2 was banned from Turkish cable television because authorities saw the representation of gay marriage as “twisted and immoral” and deemed dangerous to the Turkish family.
- In 2014, the film "Yeryüzü Aşkın Yüzü Oluncaya Dek" (Until the Face of the Earth Becomes a Face of Love) was removed from the programme of the International Antalya Film Festival by festival organisers after a warning that showing the film may commit the crime of insulting Turkey's president.
- In 2015, the Istanbul film festival cancelled the screening of the film North (original title: Bakur) after the Turkish Ministry of Culture complained. The film showed a footage of a few members of the outlawed Kurdistan Workers' Party.
- In 2016, the Ankara International Film Festival, which did not require registration documents for films before 2015, requested this document from all the producers of films that passed the pre-screening to be added to the programme. Two directors who said that registration documents were being used as a form of censorship and, for this reason, they would not get them, had their films removed from the programme.
- In April 2017, the futuristic satire short film called "The Last Schnitzel" banned from the International Istanbul Film Festival because the filmmakers refused to comply with the Turkish ministry.
- In 2017, the Ankara Governor's Office banned the German embassy's LGBT Film Festival.
- On 17 November 2017, the governor's office of Ankara banned public showings of all LGBT films, exhibitions and events, due to "public sensitivities."
- In 2017, Sony Pictures distributed a self-censored version of the movie Blade Runner 2049 in Turkey, leaving out various scenes from the original cut that display nudity. Sony Pictures explained this decision by stating that "slightly edited versions" of the film were supplied in some territories "to be respectful of the local culture".
- In 2018, the Adana State Theatre's play “India Bank,” which was on tour in the province of Batman, was removed from the stage because of an intervention by Batman provincial Culture and Tourism Directorate officials. The theatre play was removed from the stage after two of its scenes were deemed “obscene.”
- In 2018, the Ankara Governor's Office banned the LGBT-related film “Pride”, citing the ongoing state of emergency in the country as a reason for the ban. The office said such events can “incite hatred and enmity” among different factions of the society, from which “danger” can arise.
- In 2020, investigations were initiated by the Presidential Communication Centre regarding a potentially homosexual character in the Netflix original series Love 101 and a case was opened in court against it. The court eventually dismissed the case as the claims could not be proven.
- In June 2020, negotiations between Netflix and members of Turkey's ruling Justice and Development Party (AKP) over the issue of including LGBT characters fell through. Turkey had demanded that a gay character be removed entirely from the script prepared for a series. Netflix refused to accept this demand and the production of the show was stopped.
- In September 2020, the Turkish Radio and Television High Council (RTÜK) ordered the removal of the movie Cuties from Netflix's catalog. Prior to the decision, Turkey's Family, Labor and Social Services Ministry had notified the RTÜK to put in place the necessary precautions about the movie.
- In September 2021, the Radio and Television Supreme Council (RTÜK) ordered removal of "Double Blind" titled episode from the Netflix series New Amsterdam (2018 TV series).
- In December 2021, Netflix removed the film "Donde caben dos" from their Turkish catalog upon the request of Radio and Television Supreme Council (RTÜK).

== Censorship of books ==
- In 1961, an issue of the Italian comic book Captain Miki banned, because "encouraged laziness and a ‘spirit of adventurousness' among Turkish people."
- In the late 1960s or early 1970s, the Karl Marx and Friedrich Engels' The Communist Manifesto, Lenin's State and Revolution and Stalin's The History of the Communist Party of the Soviet Union (Bolsheviks) banned.
- In July 1972, police raided 30 publishing houses in Istanbul and confiscated between 250,000 and 500,000 books and detained over 50 publishers, distributors and booksellers.
- In January 1973, martial law prosecutor ordered 137 leftist publications to be burnt.
- In 1973, 11 publishers were charged for publishing the novel The Grapes of Wrath, because they were "spreading propaganda unfavorable to the state."
- In 1987, the National Geographic Atlas of the World was banned.
- In 1989, Turkey banned the import, sale and distribution of The Satanic Verses.
- In 2004, the book The Eleven Thousand Rods was censored in Turkey and its publisher, was sentenced to a monetary fine of 684 Turkish Lira on the grounds of "obscenity" and "harming inner feelings of the people".
- In 2007, The God Delusion had caused its publisher Erol Karaaslan to be investigated by an Istanbul prosecutor for "inciting religious hatred."
- In 2008, Nedim Gürsel, faced charges for "incitement to violence or hatred" after publishing his book Daughters of Allah, which supposedly insulted Islam.
- In 2013, two verses of the poem "Table," which was written by the Turkish poet Edip Cansever, were omitted from high school books since they include the word "beer."
- In 2013, Turkey lifted of decades-old bans on 453 books and 645 periodicals.
- In 2013, Turkey censored John Steinbeck's classic, Of Mice and Men on grounds of "immorality."
- In 2013, a teacher in Istanbul risked disciplinary sanctions for giving students homework from My Sweet Orange Tree.
- On August 1, 2019, the Minister of National Education said, in response to a parliamentary question, that 301,878 books have been destroyed across Turkey since the July 2016 coup attempt over "Gülenist propaganda".

== Internet censorship ==
Turkey's Internet censorship regime shifted from "moderate" to "severe" in late 2016 following a series of social media shutdowns, regional Internet blackouts and restrictions on VPN and Tor circumvention tools documented by independent digital rights watchdog Turkey Blocks. Months earlier, human rights research group Freedom House had already downgraded its outlook of internet freedom in the country to "Not Free", noting in its report that the assessment was made before further restrictions following the abortive military coup in July.

With regard to Internet censorship, in the 2017 Report on media freedom and freedom of expression in Turkey, the Commissioner for Human Rights of the Council of Europe found out:

- the increase of blocking and filtering of web pages;
- an increased practice of resorting to bandwidth throttling during times of domestic crises, making certain social media and platforms inaccessible.;
- cases of full internet shutdowns;
- Increase of prosecutions and detentions for online activities causing a great chilling effect (a.k.a. self-censorship).

In earlier years, the Turkish government implemented legal and institutional reforms driven by the country's ambitions to become a European Union member state. At the same time Turkey demonstrated its high sensitivity to defamation and other "inappropriate" online content, resulting in the closure of a number of local and international Web sites. All Internet traffic passes through Türk Telekom's infrastructure, allowing centralized control over online content and facilitating the implementation of shutdown decisions.

In December 2010 the OpenNet Initiative, a non-partisan organization based in Canada and the United States that investigates, analyzes, and exposes Internet filtering and surveillance practices, classified Internet censorship in Turkey as selective (third lowest of four classifications) in the political, social, and Internet tools areas and found no evidence of censorship in the conflict/security area. However, also in 2010, Reporters Without Borders added Turkey to its list of 16 countries "under surveillance" (the less serious of two Internet censorship lists that it maintains), saying:

The year 2010 was marked by the widely covered deblocking of the video-sharing website YouTube which, unfortunately, did not equate to a lifting of online censorship in Turkey. In a country where taboo topics abound, several thousand websites are still inaccessible and legal proceedings against online journalists persist.

In July 2010 the Alternative Informatics Association organized one of the first and largest street protests against Internet censorship in Istanbul. A second protest took place in May 2011 with demonstrations in 30 cities in Turkey.

In its Freedom on the Net 2016 report, Freedom House gave Turkey a "freedom on the net status" of "not free" saying that:

- Mobile and internet connections were repeatedly suspended in Yuksekova, Cizre, Sur, Silopi, and other cities in the southeast of the country during raids by security agencies against militants; Twitter, Facebook, and YouTube were temporarily blocked on numerous occasions—typically in the aftermath of terrorist attacks—until they restricted access to specific posts or accounts;
- Turkey accounted for almost 90 percent of all content that was locally restricted by Twitter in the second half of 2015. Turkey's regulator fined the company TRY 150,000 (US$51,000) for refusing to remove what it termed "terrorist propaganda" from the site;
- Pro-government trolls have escalated their campaigns to harass opposition voices and organizations on social media through smear campaigns and fake accounts;
- Journalists such as Hayri Tunç, Aytekin Gezici, and Bülent Keneş received lengthy prison sentences for "insulting" public officials or spreading "terrorism propaganda";
- A 14-day cyberattack brought almost 400,000 Turkish websites offline and temporarily suspended retail banking services in the country.

The Freedom on the Net 2015 report, tracked that over 60,000 websites remain blocked in Turkey, and that TIB blocked 22,645 websites without prior court order only in 2014. Twitter was blocked for two weeks and YouTube for two months in 2014. On March 21, 2014, Twitter access for Turkish users was blocked for two weeks in the run-up to local elections to prevent a stream of leaked wiretapped recordings of senior officials that had appeared on the site, prompting Prime Minister Recep Tayyip Erdoğan to declare he would "root out" the network. In March 2014, Google claimed that Turkish ISPs had set up servers that were masquerading as Google's DNS, in order to block services such as YouTube and Twitter.

In the 11th biannual transparency report published on September 19, 2017, Twitter said that Turkey was the first among countries where about 90 percent of removal requests came from. Also, Turkey has submitted the highest volume of removal requests to Twitter in 2014, 2015, and 2016.

During the 2016–17 purges, the secure instant messaging app ByLock was accused by the Turkish government of being used primarily by members of the Gülen movement, which it classifies as a terrorist organization, during the failed coup. The government launched investigations of over 23,000 citizens for connections to Gülen, based solely on evidence that they had downloaded or used ByLock. Some of these investigations resulted in arrests and detainment. However, in December 2017, the government announced that it would investigate 11,480 phone numbers had been falsely accused of ties to ByLock and Gülen, after finding that the accusations were induced by unrelated apps embedding a web beacon pointing to the ByLock website from within. An arrest warrant was also issued against the developer of one of these apps.

According to the decision published in the T.C. Resmî Gazete on 1 August 2019, online media service providers such as Netflix, BluTV and Puhutv, which broadcast series on the Internet, came under the control of RTÜK. Following this decision, digital broadcasting platforms were obliged to obtain a broadcast license to continue broadcasting. With the decision, the RTÜK administration specified that the violation of the rules of broadcasting could result in sanctions for the broadcasters.

On 1 July 2020, in a statement made to his party members, Erdoğan announced that the government would introduce new measures and regulations to control or shut down social media platforms such as YouTube, Twitter and Netflix. Through these new measures, each company would be required to appoint an official representative in the country to respond to legal concerns. The decision comes after a number of Twitter users insulted his daughter Esra after she welcomed her fourth child.

=== Legal framework ===
Internet Law No. 5651 was enacted in 2007 Turkey with the declared objective of protecting families and minors. The way for its enactment was paved after the ban imposed on Youtube.com in 2007, because of a video insulting the Turkish Republic's founder Kemal Atatürk. Since then, such law was enforced in a restrictive manner, often causing episodes of censorship against common citizens, journalists and media outlets. For this reason, experts consider Law No. 5651 particularly controversial.

On 5 February 2014 the Turkish Parliament adopted a controversial bill amending the Internet regulation in Turkey. It allows the telecommunications authority (TIB) to block any website within 4 hours without first seeking a court ruling, and requires Internet providers to store all data on web users' activities for two years and make it available to the authorities upon request. After the 15 July 2016 coup attempt, TIB’S power were transferred to the Technology and Communications Authority (Information and Communication Technologies Authority– BTK), which previously oversaw the TIB's operations.

Internet Law No. 5651 prohibits:

- crimes against Atatürk (Article 8/b),
- offering or promoting prostitution,
- providing place and opportunity for gambling,
- unauthorized online gambling and betting,
- sexual abuse of children,
- encouraging suicide,
- supplying drugs that are dangerous for health, and
- facilitation of the abuse of drugs.

Web sites are also blocked for the following reasons:

- downloading of MP3 and movies in violation of copyright laws,
- insults against state organisations and private persons
- crimes related to terrorism
- violation of trademark regulations
- unfair trade regulated under the Turkish Commercial Code
- violation of Articles 24, 25, 26, and 28 of the Constitution (freedoms of religion, expression, thought, and freedom of press).

Since the 2015 amendments, national security is also a basis for broad access bans.

Decisions to block a website can be appealed, but usually only after a site has been blocked. Nevertheless, due to the public profile of the major websites banned and the lack of juridical, technical, or ethical arguments to justify the censorship, the blocked sites are often available using proxies or by changing DNS servers.

In September 2017, Turkey's Supreme Court ruled that having ByLock, a mobile messaging application, installed on one's phone is enough evidence to convict a suspect as a member of the Gülen movement.

=== Blocking of Internet sites ===
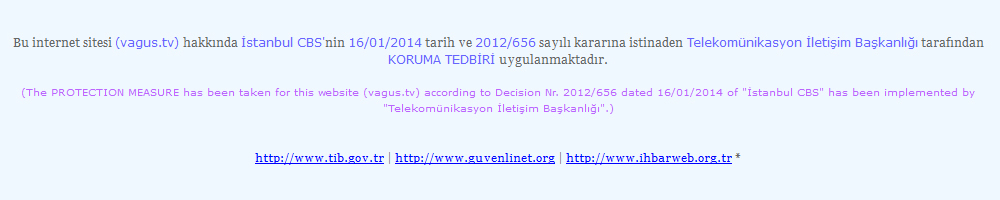
The notification used by TİB stating the legal authority under which the particular website is blocked.

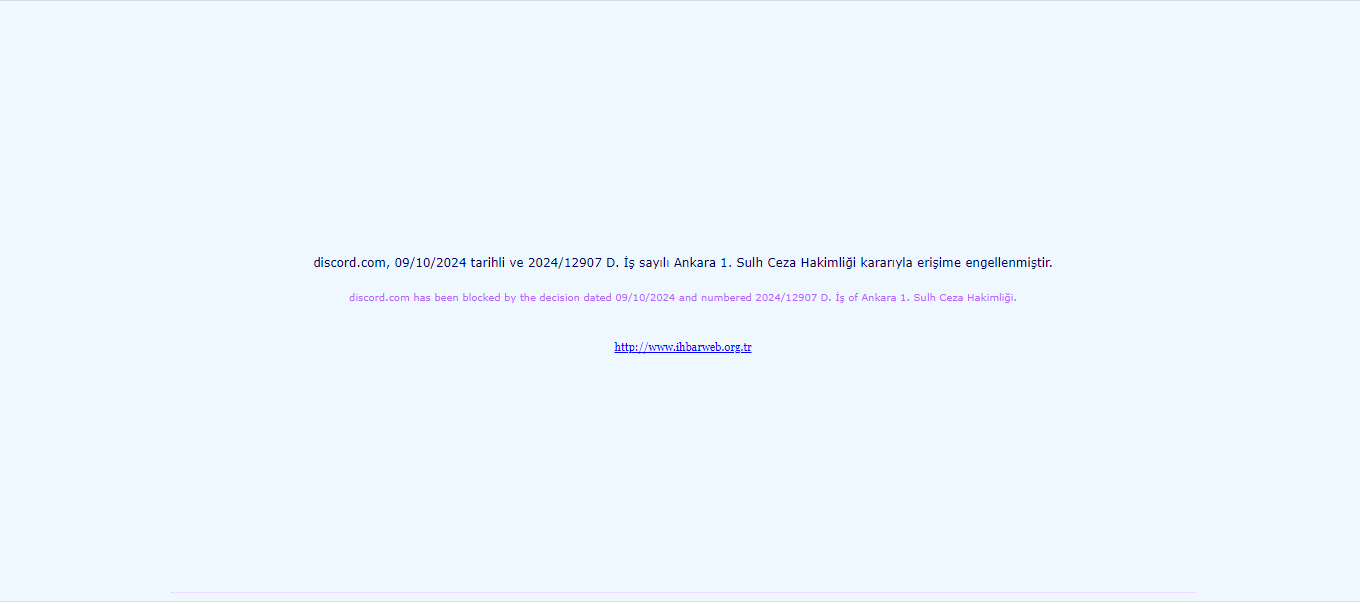
Discord Blocked by Turkey BTK

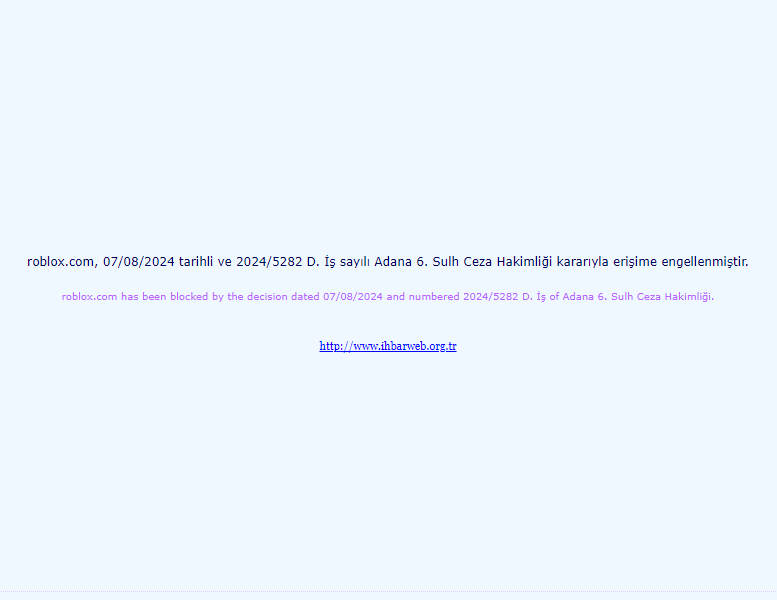
roblox.com

Web sites are blocked for intellectual property infringement, particularly file sharing and streaming sites; for providing access to material that shows or promotes the sexual exploitation and abuse of children, obscenity, prostitution, or gambling; for insults to Mustafa Kemal Atatürk, the founding father of modern Turkey; for reporting news on southeastern Turkey and Kurdish issues; or which defame individuals. In addition to widespread filtering, state authorities are proactive in requesting the deletion or removal of content online. Imgur, Pastebin and TinyURL were also blocked in Turkey.

A leading case regarding Internet censorship is Ahmet Yildirim v. Turkey (2013), before the European Court of Human Rights (ECtHR): it concerns the Internet Law No. 5651 and the blocking of Google Sites, defamation, the usage of disproportionate measures, and the need for restrictions to be prescribed by law.

In 2019, according to activists, more than 61,000 websites have been blocked in Turkey and more than 5,500 articles banned. In addition, many news websites had to remove their articles to avoid ban of their services in the country.

Some other cases of blocking of Internet sites are the following:

- By August 2008 hundreds of sites are temporarily blocked on similar grounds.
- According to an August 2008 Milliyet article, 11494 complaints (mostly on grounds of indecency) have resulted in 853 motions to block.
- By mid-2008 growing discontent with the blocks resulted in a grass roots protest campaign organized by the website elmaaltshift.com, which encouraged websites to replace their home page with an interstitial webpage titled "Access To This Site Is Denied By Its Own Decision."
- An October 2008 article in Radikal raised the number of blocked sites to 1112. YouTube's parent, Google, decided to selectively prevent access to the offending videos to users in Turkey in order to prevent the entire site from being blocked. Turkish prosecutors, not content, demanded a global block in order not to offend Turkish users abroad. Google did not comply.
- Oktar has successfully had the Turkish government to block access to several websites such as; Richard Dawkins' site, richarddawkins.net for 2 years, Internet site of the Union of Education and Scientific Workers, the country's third-biggest newspaper site, Vatan. He was later convicted of 24 crimes, including fraud and sexual abuse, and sentenced to 8,658 years in prison. Access to his 121 websites has been blocked.
- In October 2008, the Turkish Minister of Transport Binali Yıldırım defended the bans, saying "Practices are needed to protect young people and the public at large from harmful material online." The newspaper Taraf said that the persistent banning of websites can be attributed to judges' inexperience in dealing with the Internet.
- Blogger (including the Blogspot.com domain) has been subjected to repeated blocks in Turkey. In October 2008, the courts temporarily banned Blogger after Lig TV (whose parent company is Digiturk) complained of copyright violation, though the ban was lifted after a few hours. Access was blocked again on 2 March 2011 following a complaint by Digiturk alleging that the platform was hosting content infringing on its broadcast rights. More recently, on 22 October 2024, Turkish authorities blocked access to the service once more.
- In November 2008, the courts banned "Rojname – Kurdish news search engine", including the rojname.com domain.
- As of June 2010, beside YouTube, more than 8,000 major and minor websites were banned, most of them being pornography and MP3 sharing sites. Other prominent websites banned include YouPorn, Mrstiff, The Pirate Bay, Megaupload, Deezer, Tagged, Slide, Dudesnude, and SHOUTcast. The Internet Movie Database has escaped being censored due to a misspelling of its domain, resulting in a futile ban on imbd.com. [sic]
- In 2010, the video sharing site Metacafe was banned by the Telecommunications Communication Presidency (TİB) of Turkey after the posting of an alleged scandalous video of the former CHP leader Deniz Baykal.
- During June 2010 Turkey's president Abdullah Gül used his Twitter account to express disapproval of the country's ban on YouTube and Google services. Gül said he had instructed officials to find legal ways of allowing access.
- Between July 2010 and October 2010, Turkey's ban of YouTube was expanded to a range of IP addresses offering services by YouTube's parent Google, including those of Google Docs, Google Translate, Google Books, Google Analytics, and Google Tools.
- Since September 2010, Kliptube has been blocked.
- In early September 2010, the online music search engine Grooveshark was banned by Turkish courts due to copyright violations.
- On 1 October 2010, and again on 8 January 2014, Turkey blocked Vimeo.
- On 1 January 2011, Turkish courts banned Wix.com, a popular site builder owned by an Israeli company. The ban was later lifted at least from Turk Telekomunikasyon A.S.
- On January 28, 2011, the popular imageboard 4chan was blocked.
- On 27 May 2011, the file sharing services RapidShare and FileServe were blocked.
- On 22 August 2011, under new regulations announced on 22 February 2011, the Information Technologies Board (BTK), an offshoot of the prime minister's office, will allow all ISP users to select one of four levels of content filtering (family, children, domestic, or standard). However having no content filter chosen exactly equals to standard filter in terms of websites blocked.
- On 21 October 2011, the media streaming service Livestream was blocked by the Turkish Republic. Later in June 2012 or earlier, the block was lifted.
- Between January and June 2012, the number of content removal requests that Google received from Turkey increased by 1,013 percent compared to the previous six-month reporting period, according to the company's transparency reports.
- On 9 March 2012, Pastebin began being blocked by the Turkish Republic. Later in June 2012 or earlier, the block was lifted but then reinstated.
- In January 2014, IP blocks of Level 3 Communications' Content delivery network were blocked, resulting in up to 20% of all requests to that CDN failing.
- In January 2014, SoundCloud was blocked after private phone conversations involving Turkish prime minister Recep Tayyip Erdoğan were uploaded to the service.
- On 21 March 2014, access to Twitter was blocked when a court ordered that "protection measures" be applied to the service. This followed earlier remarks by Prime Minister Tayyip Erdoğan who vowed to "wipe out Twitter" following damaging allegations of corruption in his inner circle. Google Public DNS was also blocked after it was prominently used to bypass the ban.
- In November 2014, it was revealed that Turkish Wikipedia entries for Vagina, Human penis, Scrotum and Vulva have been censored only by main service provider TTNET.
- In April 2015, a Turkish court ordered an access ban on a single post on WordPress. But for many users, that meant their Internet service providers blocked WordPress entirely.
- On 6 April 2015, Turkey blocked access to Twitter, YouTube and Facebook after images of a prosecutor held hostage by far-left DHKP-C militants with a gun held at his head were posted. The prosecutor was later killed in the crisis. Facebook quickly complied with the court's decision and removed the content, resulting in the removal of the block for the website.
- On 17 April 2015, Turkey briefly blocked access to the URL shortening service Bitly. Instead of being redirected to the full URL, users following a link to the domain bit.ly were served a page stating (in Turkish) that "this internet site (bit.ly) is placed under administrative measures by the Telecommunication Authority". The blocking was an application of the new Internet regulation law, under which the Telecommunication Authority no longer has to seek court approval before blocking a whole site. No reason for the blocking was provided. Officials of the Telecommunication Authority stated later that the blocking had been due to a "technical error".
- As of 20 April 2015, the list of blocked Internet sites maintained by the monitoring website Engelli Web contained over 78,000 domain names.
- On 25 July 2015, Turkey has blocked 96 Kurdish and left-wing news websites along with 23 Twitter accounts due to “administrative measures” targeting not only websites based in Turkey, but also in northern Iraq, as Turkish fighter jets continued to bomb the Kurdistan Workers' Party (PKK) in northern Iraq. The blocked websites include Rudaw, BasNews, DİHA, ANHA, Özgür Gündem, Yüksekova Haber, Sendika.Org, RojNews and Jinha.
- As of 25 July 2015, more than 81,000 websites are blocked in Turkey, according to monitoring website EngelliWeb.
- On 10 October 2015, following the first of two bombings in Ankara, censorship monitoring organization Turkey Blocks corroborated user reports that Turkey intentionally restricted access to Twitter in an apparent attempt to control the flow of information relating to the attack.
- In November 2015, the Turkish government has officially blocked access to Reddit.
- In July 2016, Turkey has blocked access to the WikiLeaks website hours after it leaked thousands of ruling party emails dating from 2010 to 6 July 2016.
- On 8 October 2016, following the leak of emails of Turkish Minister Berat Albayrak by RedHack, the Information and Communication Technologies Authority (BTK) ordered ISPs to block several file sharing websites, including Dropbox, Microsoft OneDrive, and Google Drive.
- On 9 October 2016, GitHub and Internet Archive were blocked and associated administrative orders were subsequently posted by the BTK stating that access had been officially restricted.
- As of 10 October 2016, a total of 114,257 websites were blocked in Turkey, according to monitoring website EngelliWeb.
- On 11 September 2016 and 27 October 2016 Turkish authorities imposed Internet blackout in the east and southeast of the country after removal and detaining of elected local officials.
- On 4 November 2016, Turkish authorities blocked access to Facebook, Twitter, YouTube and WhatsApp in the country, following the detention of 11 Free Democratic Party (HDP) members of parliament. Internet restrictions are increasingly being used to suppress coverage of political incidents, a form of censorship deployed at short notice to prevent civil unrest.
- In December 2016, Turkey has blocked ten of the most used VPN services in Turkey, which were popular ways of accessing banned social media sites and services. Turkish ISPs have also blocked the usage of Tor.
- On 9 March 2018, the Citizen lab published a report showing strong evidence that PacketLogic devices from Sandvine could have been used to deploy government spyware in Turkey. Users were silently redirected to malicious versions by way of injected HTTP redirects. The Citizen Lab performed a number of tests contrasting the behaviour of network data traffic in these countries with a PacketLogic device procured independently.
- On 16 March 2018, Turkish authorities further tightened the internet censorship by blocking access to services that are commonly used to circumvent the restrictions. Among the new targets were copious VPN providers, as well as Proton Mail, which provides encrypted email services. A week after, the Information Technologies Board issued one more press release suggesting that a major technical update is underway that could block access to many VPN providers collectively, but did not elaborate on the scope of the anticipated policy.
- On 16 November 2018, Turkish authorities blocked BunnyCDN, a European content delivery network, which blocked access to some 14,000 sites.
- On 23 February 2020, Turkish authorities blocked Jinnews for the ninth time.
- According to data published by NetBlocks, between 27 and 28 February 2020, social media platforms and messaging services were blocked in Turkey for 16 hours after the country launched airstrikes against Syria.
- On 26 November 2020, music streaming platform Tidal was blocked upon the request of RTÜK and was blocked until December 2020.
- On 24 December 2020, Turkish authorities closed the website hamsvasser.com which, according to Pakistani officials, was operated by India and used propaganda against Pakistan.
- On 4 January 2022, non-profit radio listening project Radio Garden has been blocked in Turkey upon the request of RTÜK.
- On 21 February 2023, Ekşi Sözlük, a popular social network, was blocked by the Information and Communication Technologies Authority.
- On 8 June 2023, Turkish authorities blocked OnlyFans following a complaint to the Presidential Communication Centre regarding the site's promotion of "immoral" acts.
- On 21 August 2023, RTÜK gave international news organization Voice of America, which was found to be broadcasting on the voaturkce.com domain name without obtaining a broadcasting license, 72 hours to pay the license fee or terminate its service.
- On 25 November 2023, around 16 VPN service blocked by Turkish authorities without court order.
- On 2 August 2024, the Instagram website and mobile app was blocked by The Turkish Information and Communications Technologies Authority. They announced that "instagram.com has been blocked by a decision on the date of 02/08/2024," without elaborating. After 9 days, on 11 August 2024, Turkey lifted the ban on Instagram after the social media platform and the Turkish government reached an agreement on a number of issues that Turkey had requested, including the removal of the accounts that supported PKK, PYD, and Gülen movement and accounts promoting child sexual abuse, encouragement of suicide, and insulting Mustafa Kemal Atatürk.
- On 7 August 2024, the online game platform Roblox was blocked by BTK on the grounds that it contained elements of child abuse and "virtual parties that encourage homosexuality and according to the news made by TRT, the TV channel run by the Turkish government, one of the reasons is a game that insults the president Recep Tayyip Erdoğan."
- On 9 October 2024, instant messaging and VoIP platform Discord was blocked by BTK.
- On 14 October 2024, live streaming Bigo Live was blocked by BTK.
- On 2 November 2024, the online 3D social platform IMVU was blocked by BTK.
- On 10 December 2024, Fansly was blocked by BTK. "fansly.com, 10/12/2024 has been blocked by the decision dated 490.05.01.2024."
- In July 2025, Turkey's Criminal Court of Peace approved a prosecutor's request access restrictions on some of Grok's posts, following allegations that the platform disseminated content insulting the country's founder, Mustafa Kemal Atatürk, President Recep Tayyip Erdoğan, and religious values. Turkish Officials had warned more action could follow. In September 2025, Turkish authorities ordered a complete block on Grok, over national security and public order concerns. As of 12 September 2025, X had not yet enforced the ban.

Afterwards, the Constitutional Court of Turkey cancelled the decision by publishing at Official Gazette of the Republic of Turkey; however, the cancellation and its announcements were suddenly deleted, and the official website of the Constitutional Court of Turkey went offline.

== Civil society initiatives ==
- Initiative for Freedom of Expression is an Istanbul-based association and movement of civil disobedience, working on the right to freedom of expression. It is a member of the global network IFEX. Since 2000, it publishes annual reports on the situation of freedom of expression in Turkey and distributes them among the main Non-Governmental Organizations, as well as to the media institutions. Every week, the Initiative publishes a Weekly Bulletin in Turkish and in English. Since 1997, it organizes biennial "Gatherings for Freedom of Expression" in Istanbul. Together with other stakeholders, it created the ÇTL database (Current Trial Library), recording thought crime cases. It opened a virtual and interactive Museum of the Crimes of Thought.
- Turkey Blocks monitors access to social media services and online mass-communication networks around Turkey's main population areas. It provides real time reporting of online incidents that may impact the safety, access to information and online business operations.
- Turkey Uncensored is an Index on Censorship project to publish articles from censored Turkish writers, artists and translators. Index on Censorship also curates the Mapping Media Freedom project - a database identifying threats, violations and limitations faced by members of the press throughout European Union member states, candidates for entry and neighbouring countries where threats on Turkish journalists and foreign journalists in Turkey are regularly monitored.
- The Platform for Independent Journalism (P24) is a timely initiative to support and promote editorial independence in the Turkish press at a time when the journalistic profession is under fierce commercial and political pressure.
- İfade Özgürlüğü Derneği (İFÖD - Freedom of Expression Association) published an annual report entitled EngelliWeb, providing detailed information on Internet censorship and blocked websites from Turkey. The association also provides legal support to anyone facing criminal charges involving political speech.
- Siyah Bant (Black Tape) was established in 2011. The website contains an archive of cases of art censorship after the year 2000, and continues to produce research, documentation and discussions of cases of censorship in the arts in Turkey.

== See also ==
- Banu Güven, Turkish journalist
- Nuray Mert and Ece Temelkuran, Turkish journalists
- Ali Kararname
- Category:Political prisoners in Turkey
- Concentration of media ownership in Turkey
- Human rights in Turkey
- Turkish textbook controversies
- Law on Crimes Committed Against Atatürk
- Media censorship and disinformation during the Gezi Park protests
- OdaTV, a Turkish news website
- Transparency of media ownership in Turkey
- List of arrested journalists in Turkey
- List of European Convention on Human Rights (ECHR) cases concerning Article 10 (right to freedom of expression) in Turkey
- List of prosecuted Turkish writers
- The Imam's Army, a 2011 book by Turkish journalist Ahmet Şık on the life and work of Fethullah Gülen and his Gülen movement
- Turkey's media purge after the failed July 2016 coup d'état
