= Internet regulation in Turkey =

Overview of internet regulation in the Republic of Turkey

Internet regulation in Turkey is primarily authorized under the Electronic Communications Law (ECL) and the Internet Act and carried out by the Information and Communication Technologies Authority (ICTA).

In 2018, the Turkish parliament passed a law giving the national broadcast media regulator, the High Council for Broadcasting (RTÜK), authority to monitor and regulate internet services. The law requires online video and streaming services to apply for a license to broadcast to Turkish internet users.

Turkey's internet, in 2018 which has 42.3 million active users, holds a 'Not Free' ranking in Freedom House's index. Turkish government has constantly blocked websites like Instagram, Discord, Twitter, YouTube and Wikipedia. Video games such as Roblox were banned. According to Twitter's transparency report, Turkey leads in social media censorship.

== Regulatory authorities ==
Turkey considers itself a democratic country. Its political system is based on the separation of powers.

Aside from the traditional structure, certain public institutions are formed to regulate and execute specific duties. These institutions are classified as “regulatory authorities (RA)” and some of them have a sector-specific focus; "regulatory and supervisory authorities are established in order to regulate and monitor different types of markets in accordance with the requirements of a functioning market economy."

Some relevant regulatory authorities in Turkey are "the Competition Authority, the Energy Market Regulation Authority, the Banking Regulation and Supervision Authority, the Information and Communication Technologies Authority, and the Tobacco, Tobacco Products and Alcoholic Beverages Market Regulation Board."

== Background ==
ICTA is attributed responsibilities about information technologies by the ECL. Among them, regulation of a dispute resolution system for domain names, e-signature, and a registered e-mail system.

The now-defunct Presidency of Telecommunication and Communication (TIB) was affiliated with ICTA which has a particular focus on telecommunications and Internet regulation. PTC was established by Law No. 5397. PTC is organized directly under ICTA and it consists of a Law Department, a Technical Management Department, an Information Systems Department, an Administration Department and an Internet Department.

Law No. 5651, known as the Internet Act (IA), was enacted on 4 May 2007. The purpose of this law has been described by the PTC as follows: "There are 2 reasons for the law to be brought out. The first reason; determining the liability and the responsibility of collective use providers, access providers, location providers and content providers which are the main actors of the Internet. The other reason is to determine the procedures and fundamentals related to the specific crimes committed over the Internet and fighting these through content, location and access providers."

The IA reorganized the duties of the PTC. These included publications that are made on the Internet environment and the law regarding fight against committed crimes by these publications. Accordingly, to implement these tasks the Internet Department has been established.

== Internet law ==
Internet content regulation is implemented by the PTC (ECL Art. 6/g, 13). Content regulation is governed by the Law No. 5651.

In February 2014, the Turkish Parliament passed "an omnibus bill including new regulations on Internet usage which gives more power to the country’s national telecommunications authority". This bill implies modifications of the Internet Act (IA) and, of some of the provisions about Internet content regulation and the authority of the PTC.

There are secondary regulations such as ordinances enacted based on the IA as well. Secondary regulations elaborate upon the provisions, of the IA, about Internet content regulation. These are namely; ordinance on the procedures about granting business certificate for the host provider and access provider, ordinance on the procedures for regulating the content of online publications.

== Content regulation ==
=== Responsibilities of the content provider and the host provider ===
Internet content regulation is governed by IA. According to the Act the main responsibility is placed on the content provider. As a rule content provider is not responsible for the linked content provided by another. However, if this content is obviously supported by the content provider he shall be responsible under general provisions (Act No. 5651 Art. 4).

On the other hand, the host provider is not responsible for supervising the legality of the content. Nevertheless, the host provider is responsible for taking out the content when notified according to the IA. The host provider is also required to save the traffic information for the period which will be determined by the ordinance (between 1–2 years). The host provider shall present the information demanded by PTC and take the precautions instructed by the PTC. According to the new version of the IA, the hosting service provider is sanctioned with monetary fines instead of imprisonment, as it was stated in the previous legislation (Act No. 5651 Art. 5).

In January 2021 a new amendment of the Law No.5651 on Regulation of Publications on The Internet and Combating Crimes Committed By Means of Such Publication, was passed that brought the following changes: Social network provider definition, It is now possible to notify administrative fines issued against hosting providers and access providers with e-mail or other communication devices within the framework of the Law No.5651 on Regulation of Publications on The Internet and Combating Crimes Committed By Means of Such Publication (the"Law No. 5651"), Increased fines against hosting providers that doesn't meet their obligations as per the Law, Possibility to decide to extraction of (where possible) the illegal content which constitutes a crime or violation of personal rights, instead of restricting access to the content as a whole, Obligation to appoint a representative in Turkey for social network service providers which track over a million daily access from Turkey and a gradual five-stage administrative sanction, Keeping the data in Turkey, Applications made by users against hosting providers, claiming their rights are violated, Obligation to prepare periodic reports by social network providers which track over a million daily access from Turkey.

=== Board of access providers ===
With the modifications to the Internet Act, a board of access providers was established. The board was given legal personality and is headquartered in Ankara. The board consists of the operators (service providers and other operators rendering Internet access services) which are authorized as per the ECL. The Board is designed to be self-sponsored. The Board is required to execute the decisions for prevention of access, excluding decisions that might have to be based on the category of crimes enumerated in Art. 8. These enumerated crimes are; inducement for committing suicide, sexual abuse of children, facilitation of drug abuse, providing detrimental drugs, obscenity, prostitution, providing place and opportunity for gambling, and crimes against Mustafa Kemal Atatürk (defined by the Law No. 5816). Information related to the crimes against Mustafa Kemal Atatürk, may be found in the External Links section of this article.

According to Art 8, in case of sufficient suspicion a decision for prevention to access, may be rendered by the judge, during the investigation phase for these enumerated crimes. If the circumstances require an express decision, the public prosecutor would also be entitled to render a decision to prevent access with a condition to present the decision to the judge in 24 hours for approval. However, the decision would promptly be revoked by the public prosecutor unless it is approved by the judge. If the suspect is found innocent at the conclusion of the judicial hearing, the decision for prevention of access shall be deemed invalid (Act No. 5651 Art. 8/1).

If the Content Provider or the Hosting Provider of the publication is located outside Turkey and involves certain enumerated crimes mentioned above the PTC shall render the decision for prevention on its own initiative. PTC shall also be entitled to render a decision for prevention in case of sexual abuse of the children, obscenity and prostitution disregarding the location of CP or HP (Act No. 5651 Art. 8/2).

Protection for intrusion upon seclusion and infringement of personal rights

Individuals or legal persons claiming infringement of personal rights are entitled to apply to CP or to HP (when access to CP is not possible). In these situations they can legally inform and warn the CP or HP about the infringement. CP or HP must reply to the application within 24 hours. The claimant is also entitled to a direct application to the court without warning the CP or HP. According to the new version of IA, the judge will render its decision only aiming the portion infringing personal rights and not the whole web site. However, if the judge deems necessary for the protection of the personal rights he can render a decision including whole content on the web site. The judge shall render his decision within 24 hours (Act No. 5651 Art. 9).

=== Presidency of Telecommunication and Communication’s authority and judicial control ===
In addition to these, the Presidency of Telecommunication and Communication (PTC) will be the competent authority if the content of the publication intrudes upon an individual's private affairs (intrusion upon seclusion). In this circumstance, PTC shall take initiative upon the individual's request. The request for prevention should include satisfactory information about how the individual's private affairs were intruded, and his credentials (Act No. 5651 Art. 9).

The individual seeking for the prevention of the content is required to submit his official demand to the Court in 24 hours. The Court shall render its decision in 48 hours stating its opinion if the content does in fact constitute intrusion upon private affairs/seclusion. Noncompliance to these time limits shall automatically conclude the invalidation of PTC's decision for prevention. According to the IA article 9/A/8 if individual's life is in peril, the President himself is entitled to render a decision for prevention. However, in this case an objection shall be submitted to the Court (Law No. 5651 Art. 9/A/5).

== Arguments supporting the Internet Act ==
=== Protection of privacy, reputation, and availability of judicial process ===
As one of the arguments in support of the IA the government addressed the protection of privacy. In a declaration, the Transportation, Maritime and Communication Minister Lutfi Elvan mentioned that “we want to protect individual rights and liberties. We want to protect and guarantee the right to privacy. In that regard, the existing bill did not respond to the needs of the people”. The Minister Elvan has also mentioned that the bill by protecting privacy, protects the violation of personal rights.

In another declaration the Prime Minister himself mentions that the new Internet law does not stipulate any censorship, and it is a measure against blackmailing, immorality, and the threat against people's reputation. In a memorandum the government also mentioned that “In the event of a breach of ‘a person’s privacy,’ such as illegal wiretapping and the sharing of personal data without consent, in order to prevent irreversible damage that could be caused by the “time lag” between the complaint of the individual and the decision of the court, the bill will make it possible to implement a temporary prevention of access. When an individual raises a complaint, the Presidency of Telecommunication and Communications will send the request to the Union of Access Providers, which will block the URL within the next four hours as a preventive measure.“The complainant should also file his request to the penal court of peace within 24 hours and the decision of the court should be given within the next 48 hours. If the decision of the court is not in favor of the complainant, the restriction on access to the URL will be removed by the Union. Unless a decision by the court is delivered to the Union within 48 hours, the restriction will be automatically removed.”

=== Compared regulation with UK ===
In response to criticism, Turkey's Communications minister defended Turkey's blocking of content by pointing to regulations in the UK. He specifically pointed to the Internet Watch Foundation's blacklist of websites hosting child pornography and criminal activity to defend the restrictions.

=== Facilitation of protective interim measures for personal rights ===
It is also declared by the government that implementation of the prevention of access decisions are facilitated by the requirement of stipulating a legal responsibility to operators for preserving traffic information up to 2 years. Government also mentions that new codification will be helpful for preventing victimization from online defamatory content in an efficient and swift way. And the final decision is to be rendered by the court. However, the initiative of the PTC is designed as a tool for an interim measure to protect the individual's personal rights from defamation till the court renders its decision. Since a defamatory content can spread very swiftly because of the nature of the Internet in the time gap till the court renders its decision.

=== Availability of partial prevention ===
According to the new version, only the infringing content will be able to be removed instead of the whole content provided on the web site

=== Inclusion of private sector in regulatory regime ===
According to the code The Board consists of the operators (service providers and other operators rendering Internet access services) which are authorized according to ECL.

=== Replacing imprisonment with monetary fines ===
Unlike the previous version, the new version of the IA includes monetary fines instead of imprisonment.

== Arguments against the Internet Act ==
=== Freedom of expression ===
Opponents to the IA have criticized it heavily. They mention that government is willing to place a censorship on freedom of expression on the Internet. They blame the government for using democratic tools for implementing censorship on Internet. They allege that Internet law does not regulate wiretapping or personal data. It regulates the prevention of access to online content under certain circumstances. However, opponents mention their concern about these issues. Opponents also criticized the TCB's authority for implementing a decision for prevention when the personal rights are involved in the online content. They mention that this regulation places a huge power on TCB. However government explains that TCB's decision will be lifted automatically if the court does not approve The Act also attracted international attention. US and EU communicated their concerns about IA. President Obama also talked to Prime Minister Recep Tayyip Erdoğan about the IA and its influence

=== Financial burden on operators ===
Opponents also mention that the establishment of the Board of access providers will place an economic burden since the Board is stipulated to be self-sponsored. Entrepreneurs are of the opinion that implementing the legal responsibilities arising from IA may cause small-scale companies a serious problem. They also express that after IA these firms may prefer to operate outside Turkey. They indicated their concerns about the anticompetitive environment;

== Safe Internet ==
Other than IA another regulation that attracted public attention was Safe Internet (SI). SI is setting up an optional, free and on-demand service for families to protect their children from detrimental content. SI present options. Users have alternatives such as family and children profiles and they can opt in or opt out of the service at any time with their consent. These profiles are also created by a board of academicians from various backgrounds such as pedagogy, psychology, law, sociology. The main objective of SI is to provide the safe, effective and right use of Internet.

== Impact of the 2014 modifications to the 2007 Internet Act ==
As mentioned above, in February 2014, the Turkish government passed an omnibus law that included provisions that modify the Internet Act of 2007.

This modifications have had impact, considering that they have been described, as a restriction over free speech. Following, there are some commentaries that expose the reaction to the 2014's Internet Act modifications:

- The Law has been described as tightening control of the Internet, while raising concerns over free speech. It has been said that this law will enable authorities to rapidly block access to webpages, without necessarily counting with a Court order. It has also been commented, that although Turkey has been seeking becoming a member of the European Union for decades, this law raises concerns and fears of the country shifting further away from EU norms.
- The intention of this law has been addressed as "to help protect Mr. Erdogan (Turkey's Prime Minister) and his allies from a widening corruption scandal by tightening government control of the Internet. It would allow the authorities, without a court order, to block web pages under the guise of protecting personal privacy, and to collect users’ browsing histories." Apparently, the "new law is a transparent effort to prevent social media and other sites from reporting on a corruption scandal that reportedly involves bid-rigging and money laundering."
- Companies like Twitter and YouTube were banned, in March 2014, by the Turkish government. "The Turkish government reinforced its heavily criticised clampdown on social media on Thursday, blocking YouTube a week after it restricted access to the micro-blogging platform Twitter. The latest curbs came hours after an audio recording of a high-level security meeting was leaked on the video-sharing website. According to Turkish media reports, the decision to block YouTube was taken by Turkey’s telecommunications authority (TİB) as a “precautionary administrative measure.” In February, Turkey passed a much criticised new internet law that allows the telecommunications regulator to block websites without a court order. Turkey previously banned YouTube in 2007, but lifted the ban three years later.
- All Wikipedia sites were effectively blocked in April 2017 by an administrative measure issued in purported accordance with law 5651, expected to be ratified by a subsequent court order. The Turkish government blocked Wikipedia after Wikipedia refused to take down content on Turkey's collaboration with the Islamic State and al-Qaeda in Syria. The Supreme Court of Turkey ended the ban in January 2020.

== See also ==
- Internet in Turkey
- Internet censorship in Turkey
- Telecommunications in Turkey
- Media in Turkey
- Tor (anonymity network)
