= Presidency of Telecommunication and Communication =

The Directorate of Telecommunication and Communication was Turkey's telecom authority prior to being shut down in August 2016. The organization's acronym in Turkish "TIB" had become synonymous for internet censorship by the time of closure due to its appearance on tens of thousands of internet block pages. It was part of the Information and Communication Technologies Authority, which is now directly responsible for duties previously tasked to the directorate.

Its 2014 blocking of Twitter was ruled to be unconstitutional.

== See also ==
- Internet regulation in Turkey
