= Information and Communication Technologies Authority (Turkey) =

Turkish government agency

- BTK; ICTA
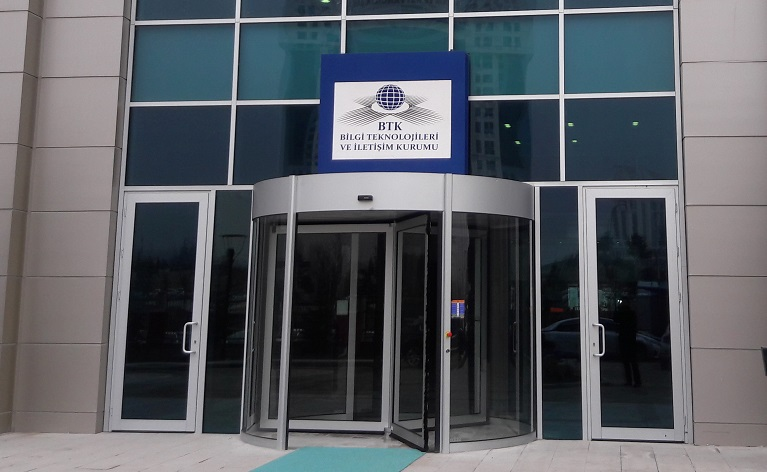
- Headquarters of Information and Communication Technologies Authority in Ankara, Turkey.

Agency overview
- Formed: 29 January 2000
- Preceding agency: Telecommunications Authority - Telekomünikasyon Kurumu
- Headquarters: Eskişehir Yolu 10.Km No:276 Çankaya, Ankara, Turkey
- Employees: 1329
- Agency executive: Ömer Abdullah Karagözoğlu
- Website: www.btk.gov.tr

The Information and Communication Technologies Authority (ICTA) (Turkish: Bilgi Teknolojileri ve İletişim Kurumu (BTK)) is a national telecommunications regulatory and inspection authority of Turkey. It was formerly known as the Telecommunications Authority (Turkish: Telekomünikasyon Kurumu (TK)).

Radio and television broadcasts fall under another state agency, RTÜK.

== History ==
The Telecommunications Authority was established by means of the Law 4502, dated 29 January 2000. This Law addressed the responsibilities of the Ministry of Transport, among others, and "separated policy-making and regulatory functions of the government by establishing an independent telecommunications regulatory body, the Telecommunications Authority, as the first sector specific regulator in Turkey. As a result, regulatory functions of the Ministry of Transport were transferred to the Authority in principle, and the General Directorate of Radiocommunication, a government body in charge of radio frequency management under the Wireless Law (Law 2813, 7 April 1983), was abolished and all of its functions were transferred to the Telecommunications Authority."

On 5 November 2008 the Turkish legislature enacted the Law N. 5809, commonly known as the Electronic Communications Law (ECL). The purpose of this law has been briefly described as "to remove the legislative untidiness, create competition in the sector, lessen the uncertainties for operators and allocate resources to R&D".

The Electronic Communications Law attributed to the Ministry of Transportation, Maritime Affairs and Communications the policy making authority in the field of electronic communications (article 5). The regulation function was given to the Telecommunications Authority (article 6).

Following article 65(3) of the Law N. 5809, the name of the Authority was changed from "Telecommunications Authority" to "Information and Communication Technologies Authority (ICTA)".

== Duties of the ICTA ==
The duties of ICTA as described in the ECL (article 6), can be summarized as given below: (taken from ICTA's official website)'

- Creation and maintaining the competition in the sector,
- Protecting the rights of subscribers, users, consumers and end users,
- Carrying out dispute resolution procedures between operators,
- Tracking the developments and stimulating the development of the electronic communications sector,
- Planning and allocation of the frequencies, satellite position and numbering,
- By taking into consideration the strategies and the policies of the Ministry of Transportation, Maritime Affairs and Communications, performing necessary regulations and supervisions, including:
- Authorization
- Tariffs
- Access
- Numbering
- Spectrum management
- Licensing for the installation and use of radio equipments and systems
- Monitoring and supervision of the spectrum
- Market observance and supervision
- Detection and elimination of electromagnetic interference.
- Transferring a specific financial resource to the Ministry of Transportation, Maritime Affairs and Communications for research, development and training activities pertaining to electronic communications sector.
- Approval and supervision of the tariffs.
- Approve the reference access offers submitted by the operators.19
- Ensuring publication and implementation of the harmonized national standards for all kinds of systems and equipments.
- Conducting frequency planning, allocation and registration procedures pertaining to radio and television broadcasting.
- Coordinating with the authorized organizations that will perform the construction, measurement, maintenance and repair activities in electronic communications sector.
- Conducting market analyses regarding electronic communications sector, determination of the relevant markets and the operator/s with significant market power in relevant markets.
- Participation in the works of international electronic communications associations and organizations, pursuing the implementation of decisions.
- Taking necessary measures specified by the legislation in force with a view to ensure that the national security, public order or public services are duly.
- Setting, auditing and/or having audited QoS standards of all types of services including universal service and determination of principles and procedures regarding setting and auditing of quality of services standards of services.

== Organization of the ICTA ==
Based on ECL, ICTA's structure consists of 4 Vice Presidents, 17 departments, 5 offices, a Legal Consulting Office, and the Telecommunication Communications Presidency with 5 departments.

== Data Collection Claims ==
Republican People's Party (CHP) Deputy Chairman Onursal Adıgüzel previously stated that BTK regularly requests user traffic data from internet service providers, a claim that the BTK has not disputed. According to the 15-page documents obtained by Medyascope, dated December 15, 2020, the BTK requested internet service providers to send internet traffic records of all users to it hourly. The BTK explained in detail the format in which the data of millions of users will be recorded and how it will be sent to internet service providers in the technical detail document it sent with the letter of the institution.

== See also ==
- Internet regulation in Turkey
- Internet in Turkey
- Internet censorship in Turkey
- Telecommunications in Turkey
