= List of ECHR cases concerning Article 10 in Turkey =

This is a List of ECHR cases concerning Article 10 in Turkey, i.e. ECHR judgements finding breaches of Article 10 of the European Convention on Human Rights by Turkey.

== Overview ==
- Communist Party v Turkey (1998) 26 EHRR 1211
- Güneş v. Turkey (dec.), no. 53916/00, 13 May 2004
- 2004/5 cases
  - Tanıyan v. Turkey: (no. 29910/96) Friendly settlement on 17 March 2005
- Alinak v. Turkey (no. 40287/98) (Mahmut Alınak's book)
- Halis Doğan and Others v. Turkey, (no. 50693/99) Judgment on 10 January 2006
- Demirel and Ateş v. Turkey (nos 10037/03 and 14813/03), judgment passed on 24 July 2007
- Üstün v. Turkey (2007) (publication of Halkın Sanatçısı, Halkın Savaşçısı: Yılmaz Güney, a biography of Yılmaz Güney)
- Birdal v Turkey (2007) - Akın Birdal
- Kaysu v Turkey (2008)
- Ürper and Others (2009) (Özgür Gündem)
- Akdas v. Turkey (2010) (no 41056/04)
- Nur Radyo Ve Televizyon Yayinciligi A.S. v. Turkey (no. 2) (ECHR 2010 - judgement of breach of Article 2010)
- "Maya" and "Yeni Dünya için Çağrı" magazines (2010)
- Hrant Dink (2010)
- Taner Akçam (2011)
- Eğitim-Sen (2012)
- Yildirim v Turkey (2012) (Google Sites#Censorship)
- Güdenoğlu and Others v. Turkey (2013)(Günlük)

== Details ==
=== Tanıyan v. Turkey ===
(no. 29910/96) Friendly settlement on 17 March 2005

Necati Tanıyan was the owner of Yeni Politika, a daily newspaper published in Istanbul between 13 April 1995 and 16 August 1995. During these four months, confiscation orders were issued for 117 of the 126 issues published, either under the Prevention of Terrorism Act or under Article 312 of the Criminal Code. The applicant appealed against the orders on 21 occasions, each of the appeals being dismissed by Istanbul State Security Court.

The applicant relied on Articles 6 (right to a fair hearing), 10 (freedom of expression), 13 (right to an effective remedy), 14 (prohibition of discrimination) and 18 (limitation on use of restrictions on rights) of the Convention. The case was struck out following a friendly settlement in which the applicant is to receive EUR 7,710 for any damage sustained and for costs and expenses. The following declaration from the Government of 4 January 2005 was part of the friendly settlement:

The Court's rulings against Turkey in cases involving measures and prosecutions under the provisions of the Prevention of Terrorism Act and under former Article 312 of the Penal Code clearly showed that Turkish law and practice needed to be brought into line with the Convention's requirements under Article 10 of the Convention. This is also reflected in the interference underlying the facts of the present case. To that end, section 8 of the Prevention of Terrorism Act was abolished by Law no. 4928 and amendments were made by the Government to Article 312 by Law no. 4744. The Government undertake to ensure that the amended Article 312 will be applied in accordance with the requirements of Article 10 of the Convention as interpreted in the Court's case-law.

=== Halis Doğan and Others v. Turkey ===
(no. 50693/99) Judgment on 10 January 2006

At the material time the applicants, Halis Doğan, Cihan Çapan, Hasan Deniz, Varlık Özmenek, Ragıp Zarakolu and Zeynep Tosun worked for the Turkish daily newspaper Özgür Bakış.

On 7 May 1999 the governor of the state of emergency region (OHAL) issued a decree, applicable with immediate effect, prohibiting the publication and distribution of Özgür Bakış in the provinces in which a state of emergency had been declared, namely Diyarbakır, Hakkari, Siirt, Şırnak, Tunceli and Van. From 7 May 1999 it was forbidden to sell, distribute or store the newspaper in the region concerned.

The applicants complained that the ban on distributing the newspaper constituted unjustified interference with their right to impart information or ideas. They relied, in particular, on Articles 10 (freedom of expression), 13 (right to an effective remedy) and 7 (no punishment without law).

The issue for the Court to determine was whether the interference with the applicants’ right to freedom of expression had been “necessary in a democratic society” within the meaning of Article 10 § 2. It observed that the decision to impose the ban had contained no reasons. Nor had there been any indication that the newspaper in question had been likely to impart ideas of violence and rejection of democracy, or had had a potentially damaging impact that warranted its prohibition. The Court therefore held unanimously that there had been a violation of Article 10. The Court further observed that it had previously held that both the provisions conferring powers on the governor of the state of emergency region to prohibit the circulation and distribution of written material and the manner in which those rules were applied escaped all judicial scrutiny. It therefore held unanimously that there had been a violation of Article 13.

=== Demirel and Ateş v. Turkey ===
(nos 10037/03 and 14813/03), judgment passed on 24 July 2007

Mrs Hünkar Demirel was the editor of the weekly newspaper Yedinci Gündem (Seventh Order of the Day) and Mr its owner. In June 2002 the applicants were twice fined for publishing in July and December 2001 statements by members of the PKK (Workers’ Party of Kurdistan) and an interview with a member of its executive committee. In addition the newspaper was ordered to be closed down for several days.

The applicants submitted that their criminal convictions had breached Article 10 (freedom of expression). The Court noted that although certain particularly virulent passages painted a very negative picture of the Turkish State, and thus gave the text a hostile connotation, they did not exhort the use of violence or incite resistance or rebellion, and they did not constitute hate-speech, which, in the Court’s view, was the essential element to be taken into consideration. The Court further noted the nature and severity of the penalties imposed on the applicants. Having regard to the circumstances of the case, the Court held unanimously that there had been a violation of Article 10.

=== Ürper and Others v. Turkey ===
(nos. 14526/07, 14747/07, 15022/07, 15737/07, 36137/07, 47245/07, 50371/07, 50372/07 and 54637/07), judgment on 20 October 2009

The applicants are 26 Turkish nationals, owners, executive directors, editors-in-chief, news directors and journalists of four daily newspapers published in Turkey: Ülkede Özgür Gündem, Gündem, Güncel and Gerçek Demokrasi. Between November 2006 and October 2007, the publication of all four newspapers was regularly suspended by the Istanbul assize court for periods ranging from 15 days to a month. The publications were considered propaganda in favour of a terrorist organisation, the PKK/KONGRA-GEL (Kurdistan Workers’ Party, an illegal organisation), as well as the approval of crimes committed by that organisation and its members, whilst at the same disclosing the identity of officials with anti-terrorist duties thus making them targets for terrorist attacks. Neither the applicants nor their lawyers participated in the court’s proceedings, and their written objections to the suspension orders were dismissed.

In addition, some of the applicants were criminally prosecuted for the same offences as those attributed to the newspapers. Thus, Ali Gürbüz, who was the owner of Ülkede Özgür Gündem, was sentenced to pay approximately EUR 217,000. Özlem Aktan, who was the executive director of Ülkede Özgür Gündem and Gündem, was indicted twice and Lütfi Ürper, who was the owner of Gündem and Güncel, three times. Hüseyin Bektaş, the owner and executive director of Gerçek Demokrasi, was similarly prosecuted.

The Court recalled that news is a perishable commodity and to delay its publication, even for a short period, may well deprive it of all its value and interest. It then observed that the decisions to suspend the newspapers publications had been taken by the courts and found that that had been a valuable safeguard of the freedom of the press. At the same time, the Court noted that the suspensions of the publications had not been imposed only on selected reports but on the future publications of entire newspapers whose content had been unknown at the time of the domestic courts’ decisions. The Court further found that the applicants’ guilt had been established in proceedings from which they had been excluded. The domestic court had decided to suspend the publications on the assumption that the applicants would commit the same kind of offences in the future. Consequently the suspension orders had had the preventive effect of dissuading the applicants from publishing similar articles or news reports in the future and had hindered their professional activities.

The Court held that less draconian measures could have been envisaged by the Turkish authorities, such as confiscation of particular issues of the newspapers or restrictions on the publication of specific articles. The Court held unanimously that by having suspended entire publications, however briefly, the authorities had restricted unjustifiably the essential role of the press as a public watch-dog in a democratic society, in violation of Article 10.
