= Telecommunications in Turkey =

Communications of Turkey
Telephones main lines in use:	16.5 million, 18th in world (2009), 12.3 million (Q3 2020)
Telephones mobile cellular:	62.8 million, 17th in world (2009), 80 million (2018), 82.2 million (Q3 2020)
Telephone system:	Urban Areas: both fiber-optic cable and digital microwave radio relay; Remote areas are reached by a domestic satellite system
International service:	Three submarine fiber-optic cables in the Mediterranean and Black Seas linking Turkey with Italy, Greece, Israel, Bulgaria, Romania, and Russia; Overland fiber-optic cables connecting Turkey to Greece, Bulgaria, and now also Syria and Iraq; 12 Intelsat earth stations, and 328 mobile satellite terminals in the Inmarsat and Eutelsat systems (2002)
Country calling code:	90
Radio broadcast stations:	AM 1, FM 102, shortwave 1 (2014)
Radios:	11.3 million (1997)
Television broadcast stations:	635 (plus 2,934 repeaters) (1995)
Televisions:	20.9 million (1997)
Internet country code:	.tr
Internet hosts:	3.4 million (2010)
Internet Service Providers ISPs:	50 (2001)
Internet users:	27.2 million (2009), 46 million (2016), 80.9 million (Q3 2020)

Telecommunications in Turkey provides information about television, radio, fixed and mobile telephones, and the Internet in Turkey.

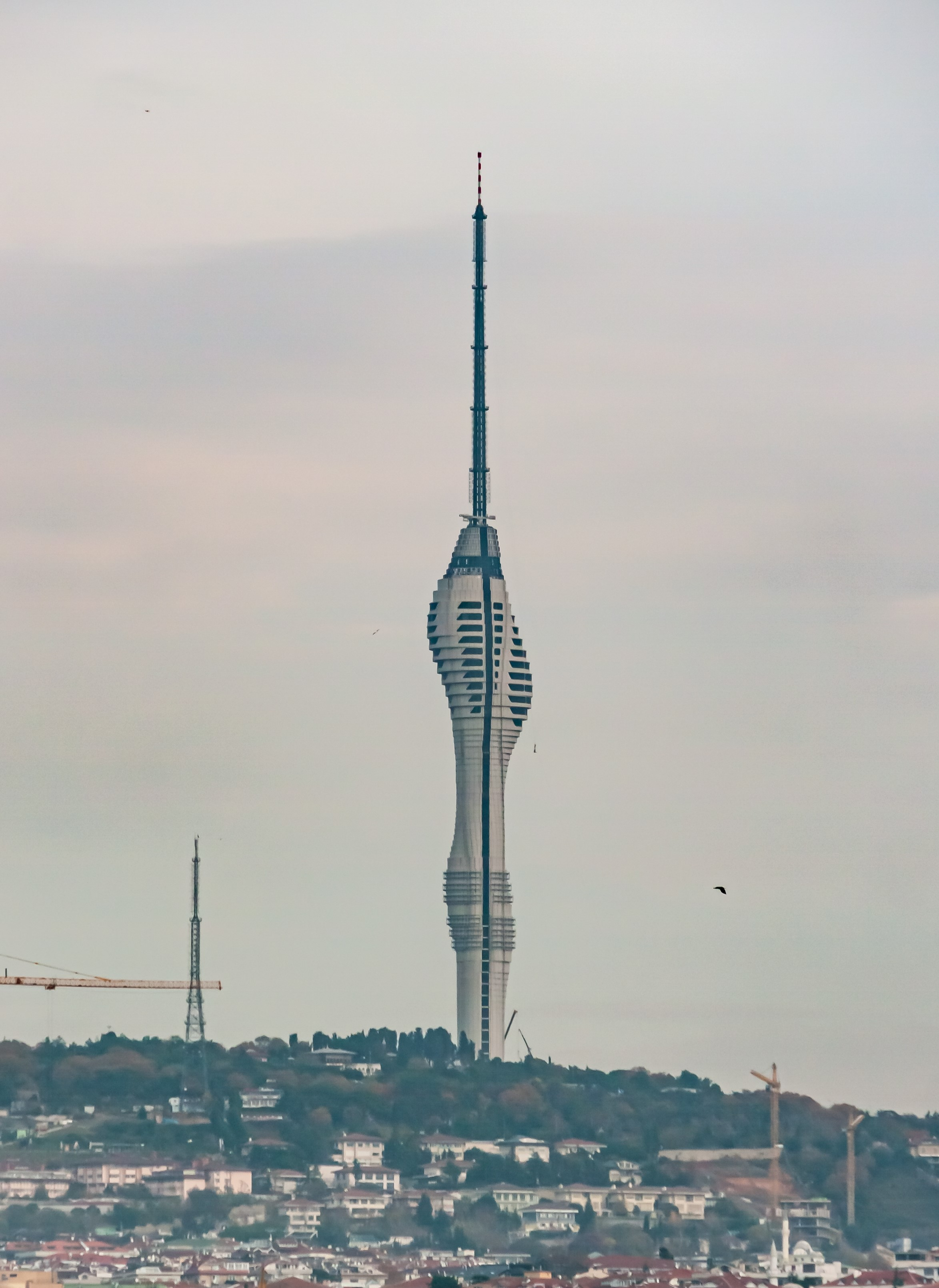
Küçük Çamlıca TV Radio Tower in Istanbul

== Telecommunications liberalisation ==
The telecommunications liberalisation process started in Turkey in 2004 after the creation of the Telecommunication Authority, and is still ongoing as of May 2013. Private sector companies operate in mobile telephony, long distance telephony and Internet access. There were 12.3 million (12.300.390) fixed phone lines, 82.2 million (82.795.432) mobile phone subscribers, and 80.9 million broadband subscribers (10.6 million xDSL, 3.8 million Fibre, 1.2 million Cable, 65 million Mobile) by Q3 2020.

Telecommunications liberalisation in Turkey is progressing, but at a slow pace. The Telecommunication Authority (now renamed Bilgi İletişim ve Teknolojileri Kurumu or BTK), while technically an independent organization, is still controlled by the Ministry of Transport and Communications.

While progress is being made (for example, local as well as long distance calls are now open to competition), the incumbent has so far managed in many areas to restrict access and protect its monopoly. For example, wholesale line rental is still not available to alternative operators, making it necessary for subscribers to pay two bills (one for line rental to the incumbent, and one to the chosen operator). The incumbent has so far managed to prevent any operator from connecting its own fiber optic cable at local loop unbundling exchanges, though it is technically required to allow this. Recently, the incumbent announced it is acquiring Invitel, one of only two other players in the inter-city capacity business, raising questions as to how the Turkish Competition Board will treat the acquisition.

The lack of progress by the BTK in ensuring a competitive playing field can be evidenced by the market share the incumbent still holds. In broadband, the incumbent's provider still occupies roughly 95% share of the market. The Governmental Audit Office of the President (T.C. Cumhurbaşkanlığı Devlet Denetleme Kurulu) issued a highly critical report of the BTK in February 2010, listing 115 findings to be addressed. For example, the report found #20 points out that the BTK has completed only 50% to 78% of its stated work plans in each of the years from 2005 to 2008.

Alternative operators are rapidly growing, yet much progress needs to be made by the BTK to improve the competitive landscape.

== Authorities ==
The political authority is Ministry of Transport, Maritime and Communication (Turkey) . But there are also two supreme councils; Radio and Television Supreme Council (abbreviated RTÜK) and Information and Communication Technologies Authority (abbreviated BTK). While internet and point to point telecommunication is controlled by BTK, radio and television broadcast is controlled by RTÜK.

== Made in Turkey mobile devices ==
In January 2021 Daily Sabah reported that Samsung had started local manufacture a line of mobile phones in Turkey. Samsung is the leader of the Turkish mobile market with 40% market share. Chinese firm Oppo released their first Made in Turkey smartphone in March 2021 with a retail price around $346. The phone has 64 GB storage, microSD support, 6.5" display and a MediaTek Helio P35 chipset.

== Registration and fees for foreign mobile devices ==
In 2017, the Turkish government introduced a requirement for all mobile phones to be registered in order to access Turkish mobile networks; both the user's details as well as the phone's IMEI must be provided. Phones that are used in the country for less than 120 days cumulatively are exempted from the registration requirement. This registration requirement "allows the government to track users’ calls, messages, and other phone activities to prevent illegal or dangerous content."

Registering a mobile phone purchased abroad also requires the payment of a fee, which is ₺31,692 as of January 2024 (about US$930). As of 2024, Turkish citizens living abroad are allowed to use foreign-purchases phones for up to 180 days in-country without paying the fee, although registration within 120 days is still required.

The registration fees for foreign mobile phones have increased very rapidly since 2017. Due to high fees and taxes, as of 2023 some smartphones cost nearly twice as much as they do in North America and Europe.

Foreign mobile device registration fees in Turkey
Date of introduction	Fee
2017 - November 2018	TL 150 (about US$41)
November 2018	TL 500 (about US$103.55)
20 July 2019	TL 1500 (about US$88.12)
2022	TL 2,732 (about US$165.09)
January 2023	TL 6091 (about US$256.85)
Prior to January 2024	TL 20,000 (about US$843.36)
January 2024	TL 31,692 (about US$930)
January 2025	TL 45,614 (about US$1,327.98)

== See also ==
- Media in Turkey
- Internet in Turkey
- List of radio stations in Turkey
- Radio and television technology in Turkey
- Telephone numbers in Turkey
- Television in Turkey
- Timeline of broadcasting in Turkey
- List of countries by number of mobile phones in use Turkey, 19th
- List of countries by smartphone penetration Turkey, 11th
- List of countries by number of telephone lines in use Turkey, 17th
- List of mobile network operators of Europe Turkey, 5th
