= Internet in Turkey =

The Internet in Turkey has been available to the public since 1993, although experimentation at Ege University started in 1987. The first available connections were dial-up. Cable Internet has been available since 1998 and ADSL since 2001. As of January 2024, Turkey had approximately 74.4 million internet users, representing an internet penetration rate of 86.5 percent of the population. According to the Turkish Statistical Institute (TÜİK), 88.8 percent of individuals aged 16 to 74 used the internet in 2024.

== Internet service providers ==
Türk Telekom is the largest internet service provider in Turkey, offering connection speeds ranging from 16 Mbit/s to 1000 Mbit/s. Several alternative broadband companies operate over Türk Telekom's infrastructure while expanding their own networks. TurkNet offers fiber broadband at speeds up to 1000 Mbit/s and operates its own fiber infrastructure in Istanbul, Izmir, Bursa, Ankara, and Kocaeli. Superonline, operated by Turkcell, offers fiber broadband in 28 cities at speeds up to 1000 Mbit/s. Kablonet provides cable internet at speeds from 16 Mbit/s to 1000 Mbit/s in areas with cable infrastructure.

== E-commerce ==
Credit card use is widespread in Turkey, and e-commerce is well established. Major Turkish internet companies have included Yemeksepeti, Gittigidiyor, and Markafoni, all of which were acquired by foreign companies in the early 2010s.

In May 2016, PayPal announced it would suspend operations in Turkey effective June 6, 2016, after the country's Banking Regulation and Supervision Agency (BDDK) denied its license renewal. The denial stemmed from regulations requiring payment service providers to localize their IT infrastructure within Turkey, a condition PayPal declined to meet. PayPal remained unavailable in Turkey as of 2024.

== Censorship ==
Internet freedom in Turkey is rated "Not Free" by Freedom House. In its 2024 Freedom on the Net report, Turkey received a score of 31 out of 100, the lowest in Europe. The Turkish government has periodically blocked major websites and platforms, including Facebook, Twitter, YouTube, and Wikipedia. Wikipedia was blocked from April 2017 to January 2020, after the Constitutional Court of Turkey ruled in December 2019 that the block violated human rights and ordered it lifted.

According to the EngelliWeb Report of the Freedom of Expression Association (İfade Özgürlüğü Derneği), Turkey had blocked access to more than 467,000 websites by the end of 2020, with more than 409,000 of those blocks resulting from orders issued by 764 different institutions, including criminal judgeships of peace and other authorized public bodies.

In July 2023, Turkish authorities imposed an advertising ban on X (formerly Twitter), which ended in May 2024 after the platform opened a local office in Turkey. On 2 August 2024, the Information and Communication Technologies Authority (BTK) blocked access to Instagram in Turkey, though other Meta-owned platforms remained accessible.

== See also ==
- Censorship in Turkey
- Internet regulation in Turkey
- List of countries by number of Internet users
- Languages used on the Internet
- List of countries by number of broadband Internet subscriptions
- List of countries by number of Internet hosts
- List of countries by Internet connection speeds
- List of countries by IPv4 address allocation
- Carna botnet
- Web Index
