= Article 312 of the Turkish Penal Code =

Turkish anti-civil disobedience law

Article 312 is a controversial article of the Turkish Penal Code relating to inciting racial or religious hatred encouraging people to disobey the law. It has been used to prosecute journalists for writing about Kurdish issues.

Article 312 imposes three-year prison sentences for incitement to commit an offence and incitement to religious or racial hatred. In 1999 the mayor of Istanbul and current president of the Turkish Republic Recep Tayyip Erdogan was sentenced to 10 months' imprisonment under Article 312 for reading a few lines from a poem that had been authorized by the Ministry of National Education for use in schools, and consequently had to resign. In 2000 the chairman of the Human Rights Association, Akin Birdal, was imprisoned under Article 312 for a speech in which he called for "peace and understanding" between Kurds and Turks, and thereafter forced to resign, as the Law on Associations forbids persons who breach this and several other laws from serving as association officials.

On February 6, 2002, a "mini-democracy package" was voted by Parliament, altering wording of Art. 312. Under the revised text, incitement can only be punished if it presents "a possible threat to public order".
