= Friendly settlement =

Out-of-court resolution of an interstate dispute

"Friendly settlement" is a term used in international law where the parties of the dispute come to an agreement which is accepted by an international court. They are encouraged by the European Court of Human Rights and the Inter-American Commission on Human Rights.
