= Turkish Internet Law =

The Turkish Internet Law, formally the Law on Regulation of Publications on the Internet and Combating Crimes Committed by Means of Such Publication was passed by the Grand National Assembly of Turkey on May 4, 2007. It was published in the Official Gazette of the Republic of Turkey as Law No. 5651 on May 23, 2007.

An expansion was approved in 2014, but was overturned by a court within a month. The law was invoked during the 2017-2020 block of Wikipedia. A major 2020 revision put further regulations on social media.
