= List of the oldest currently registered internet domain names =

This is a list of the oldest extant registered generic top-level domains used in the Domain Name System of the internet.

Until 1986, Domain Registration was limited to organizations with access to ARPANET. The possibility of registration of UUCPNET, BITNET and CSNET hosts was announced in February 1986.

== .com ==
Rank	Date of registration	Domain	Registered to
1	March 15, 1985	symbolics.com	Symbolics
2	April 24, 1985	bbn.com	BBN Technologies
3	May 24, 1985	think.com	Thinking Machines
4	July 11, 1985	mcc.com	Microelectronics and Computer Technology Corporation
5	September 30, 1985	dec.com	Digital Equipment Corporation
6	November 7, 1985	northrop.com	Northrop Corporation
7	January 9, 1986	xerox.com	Xerox PARC
8	January 17, 1986	sri.com	SRI International
9	March 3, 1986	hp.com	Hewlett-Packard
10	March 5, 1986	bellcore.com	Bell Communications Research
11	March 19, 1986	ibm.com	IBM
12	March 19, 1986	sun.com	Sun Microsystems
13	March 25, 1986	intel.com	Intel
14	March 25, 1986	ti.com	Texas Instruments
15	April 25, 1986	att.com	AT&T
16	May 8, 1986	gmr.com	General Motors Research Laboratories
17	May 8, 1986	tek.com	Tektronix
18	July 10, 1986	fmc.com	FMC Corporation
19	July 10, 1986	ub.com	Ungermann-Bass
20	August 5, 1986	bell-atl.com	Bell Atlantic
21	August 5, 1986	ge.com	General Electric
22	August 5, 1986	grebyn.com	Grebyn Corporation
23	August 5, 1986	isc.com	Interactive Systems Corporation
24	August 5, 1986	nsc.com	National Semiconductor
25	August 5, 1986	stargate.com	Stargate Information Services
26	September 2, 1986	boeing.com	Boeing
27	September 18, 1986	itcorp.com	Interrupt Technology Corporation
28	September 29, 1986	siemens.com	Siemens AG
29	October 18, 1986	pyramid.com	Pyramid Technology
30	October 27, 1986	alphacdc.com	Alpha Communications Development Corporation
31	October 27, 1986	bdm.com	BDM Corporation
32	October 27, 1986	fluke.com	Fluke Corporation
33	October 27, 1986	inmet.com	Intermetrics
34	October 27, 1986	kesmai.com	Kesmai
35	October 27, 1986	mentor.com	Mentor Graphics
36	October 27, 1986	nec.com	NEC Corporation
37	October 27, 1986	ray.com	Raytheon
38	October 27, 1986	rosemount.com	Rosemount Inc.
39	October 27, 1986	vortex.com	Vortex Technology
40	November 5, 1986	alcoa.com	Alcoa
41	November 5, 1986	gte.com	General Telephone and Electronics
42	November 17, 1986	adobe.com	Adobe Systems
43	November 17, 1986	amd.com	Advanced Micro Devices (AMD)
44	November 17, 1986	das.com	DA Systems, Inc.
45	November 17, 1986	data-io.com	Data I/O Corporation
46	November 17, 1986	octopus.com	Octopus Enterprises
47	November 17, 1986	portal.com	Portal Communications Company
48	November 17, 1986	teltone.com	Teltone Corporation
49	December 11, 1986	3com.com	3Com Corporation
50	December 11, 1986	amdahl.com	Amdahl Corporation
51	December 11, 1986	ccur.com	Concurrent Computer Corporation
52	December 11, 1986	ci.com	Cognition, Inc.
53	December 11, 1986	convergent.com	Convergent Technologies
54	December 11, 1986	dg.com	Data General
55	December 11, 1986	peregrine.com	Peregrine Systems
56	December 11, 1986	quad.com	Quadratron Systems Inc.
57	December 11, 1986	sq.com	SoftQuad
58	December 11, 1986	tandy.com	Tandy Corporation
59	December 11, 1986	tti.com	Citicorp/TTI
60	December 11, 1986	unisys.com	Unisys
61	January 19, 1987	cgi.com	Carnegie Group Inc.
62	January 19, 1987	cts.com	Crash TimeSharing
63	January 19, 1987	spdcc.com	S.P. Dyer Computer Consulting
64	February 19, 1987	apple.com	Apple Computer
65	March 4, 1987	nma.com	Network Management Associates
66	March 4, 1987	prime.com	Prime Computer
67	April 4, 1987	philips.com	Philips
68	April 23, 1987	datacube.com	Datacube Inc.
69	April 23, 1987	kai.com	Kuck and Associates, Inc.
70	April 23, 1987	tic.com	Texas Internet Consulting
71	April 23, 1987	vine.com	Vine Technology
72	April 30, 1987	ncr.com	NCR Corporation
73	May 14, 1987	cisco.com	Cisco Systems
74	May 14, 1987	rdl.com	Research Development Laboratories
75	May 20, 1987	slb.com	Schlumberger Limited
76	May 27, 1987	parcplace.com	ParcPlace Systems, Inc.
77	May 27, 1987	utc.com	United Technologies Corporation
78	June 26, 1987	ide.com	Interactive Development Environments
79	July 9, 1987	trw.com	TRW
80	July 13, 1987	unipress.com	Unipress Software
81	July 27, 1987	dupont.com	DuPont
82	July 27, 1987	lockheed.com	Lockheed Corporation
83	July 28, 1987	rosetta.com	Rosetta Consulting
84	August 18, 1987	toad.com	John Gilmore
85	August 31, 1987	quick.com	Quicksilver Engineering
86	September 3, 1987	allied.com	AlliedSignal
87	September 3, 1987	dsc.com	Digital Sound Corporation
88	September 3, 1987	sco.com	Santa Cruz Operation
89	September 22, 1987	gene.com	Genentech
90	September 22, 1987	kccs.com	KC Computer Sciences
91	September 22, 1987	spectra.com	Spectragraphics Corporation
92	September 22, 1987	wlk.com	W.L. Kennedy Jr. & Associates
93	September 30, 1987	mentat.com	Mentat Inc.
94	October 14, 1987	wyse.com	Wyse Technology
95	November 2, 1987	cfg.com	Caine, Farber & Gordon, Inc.
96	November 9, 1987	marble.com	Marble Associates, Inc.
97	November 16, 1987	cayman.com	Cayman Systems, Inc.
98	November 16, 1987	entity.com	Entity Cyber, Inc.
99	November 24, 1987	ksr.com	Kendall Square Research
100	November 30, 1987	nynexst.com	NYNEX Science & Technology

== .org ==
Rank	Date of registration	Domain	Registered to
1	July 10, 1985	mitre.org	Mitre Corporation
2	December 10, 1998	darpa.org	DARPA
3	March 25, 1986	src.org	Semiconductor Research Corporation
4	July 10, 1986	super.org	Center for Computing Sciences
5	January 7, 1987	aero.org	The Aerospace Corporation
6	January 15, 1987	mcnc.org	Microelectronics Center of North Carolina
7	April 2, 1987	rand.org	RAND Corporation
8	April 4, 1987	mn.org	SkyPoint Communications
9	May 1, 1987	rti.org	RTI International
10	July 14, 1987	usenix.org	USENIX
11	September 2, 1987	software.org	BSA Foundation (launched by Software Alliance)
12	February 25, 1988	fidonet.org	FidoNet
13	April 27, 1988	ampr.org	AMPRNet
14	August 4, 1988	osf.org	Open Software Foundation
15	August 11, 1988	ida.org	Institute for Defense Analyses
16	September 9, 1988	cactus.org	Capital Area Central Texas Unix Society
17	September 9, 1988	nm.org	New Mexico Technet
18	September 22, 1988	ccf.org	Cleveland Clinic
19	October 21, 1988	erim.org	Environmental Research Institute of Michigan
20	November 11, 1988	ski.org	Smith-Kettlewell Eye Research Institute
21	November 30, 1988	iti.org	
22	January 11, 1989	jax.org	Jackson Laboratory
23	January 13, 1989	ncsc.org	National Center for State Courts
24	February 9, 1989	aaai.org	Association for the Advancement of Artificial Intelligence
25	February 24, 1989	ie.org	
26	March 29, 1989	stjude.org	St. Jude Children's Research Hospital
27	April 11, 1989	mbari.org	Monterey Bay Aquarium Research Institute
28	May 24, 1989	castle.org	
29	June 7, 1989	carl.org	
30	June 27, 1989	msri.org	Mathematical Sciences Research Institute
31	July 15, 1989	agi.org	
32	July 17, 1989	sf-bay.org	Scott Hazen Mueller
33	July 31, 1989	mef.org	
34	August 11, 1989	oclc.org	Online Computer Library Center
35	August 23, 1989	ei.org	
36	September 5, 1989	cas.org	Chemical Abstracts Service
37	September 11, 1989	battelle.org	Battelle Memorial Institute
38	September 12, 1989	sub.org	
39	September 21, 1989	aip.org	American Institute of Physics
40	September 28, 1989	sdpa.org	
41	November 8, 1989	lonestar.org	
42	December 1, 1989	ieee.org	Institute of Electrical and Electronics Engineers
43	January 10, 1990	cit.org	
44	January 22, 1990	sematech.org	SEMATECH
45	February 7, 1990	omg.org	
46	February 12, 1990	decus.org	
47	March 13, 1990	sublink.org	
48	March 16, 1990	cam.org	
49	March 20, 1990	cpl.org	Cleveland Public Library
50	April 10, 1990	ori.org	Oregon Research Institute
51	April 13, 1990	fhcrc.org	Fred Hutchinson Cancer Research Center
52	May 16, 1990	nwf.org	National Wildlife Federation
53	May 18, 1990	mskcc.org	
54	May 23, 1990	boystown.org	Boys Town
55	May 24, 1990	bwc.org	
56	May 31, 1990	topsail.org	
57	June 28, 1990	ciit.org	
58	July 17, 1990	central.org	
59	July 27, 1990	mind.org	
60	August 3, 1990	stonemarche.org	
61	August 28, 1990	cshl.org	
62	August 30, 1990	fstrf.org	
63	September 12, 1990	dorsai.org	
64	September 14, 1990	elf.org	
65	September 18, 1990	siggraph.org	SIGGRAPH
66	September 21, 1990	sjh.org	
67	September 27, 1990	igc.org	Institute for Global Communications
68	October 10, 1990	cotdazr.org	
69	October 10, 1990	eff.org	Electronic Frontier Foundation
70	October 10, 1990	sfn.org	Society for Neuroscience
71	October 31, 1990	csn.org	
72	November 1, 1990	sfbr.org	
73	November 7, 1990	ais.org	
74	November 7, 1990	hjf.org	
75	January 4, 1991	uniforum.org	
76	January 4, 1991	wgbh.org	WGBH Educational Foundation
77	February 1, 1991	fsf.org	Free Software Foundation
78	February 6, 1991	eso.org	European Southern Observatory
79	February 6, 1991	tiaa.org	Teachers Insurance and Annuity Association of America
80	February 13, 1991	nysernet.org	NYSERNet
81	February 20, 1991	acr.org	American College of Radiology
82	February 26, 1991	nybc.org	New York Blood Center
83	February 26, 1991	nypl.org	New York Public Library
84	April 10, 1991	cnytdo.org	
85	April 10, 1991	htr.org	
86	April 10, 1991	hvtdc.org	
87	April 10, 1991	nycp.org	
88	April 11, 1991	bpl.org	Boston Public Library
89	April 11, 1991	scra.org	South Carolina Research Authority
90	April 12, 1991	amnh.org	American Museum of Natural History
91	April 15, 1991	hellnet.org	
92	April 15, 1991	sil.org	SIL International
93	April 18, 1991	apc.org	
94	April 22, 1991	mobot.org	Missouri Botanical Garden
95	April 25, 1991	cni.org	Coalition for Networked Information
96	May 1, 1991	gumption.org	
97	May 2, 1991	hslc.org	
98	May 13, 1991	guild.org	
99	May 22, 1991	acs.org	American Chemical Society
100	May 22, 1991	lpl.org	

== .edu ==
Registration within .edu is restricted to accredited educational institutions. Prior to October 2001, registration was available worldwide; it has since been limited to institutions based in the United States.

Rank	Date of registration	Domain	Registered to
1	April 24, 1985	berkeley.edu	University of California, Berkeley
1	April 24, 1985	cmu.edu	Carnegie Mellon University
1	April 24, 1985	purdue.edu	Purdue University
1	April 24, 1985	rice.edu	Rice University
1	April 24, 1985	ucla.edu	University of California, Los Angeles
6	April 25, 1985	rutgers.edu	Rutgers University
7	May 23, 1985	mit.edu	Massachusetts Institute of Technology
8	June 27, 1985	harvard.edu	Harvard University
9	July 5, 1985	columbia.edu	Columbia University
10	July 15, 1985	cornell.edu	Cornell University
11	July 18, 1985	uiuc.edu	University of Illinois at Urbana–Champaign
12	July 24, 1985	udel.edu	University of Delaware
13	July 31, 1985	umd.edu	University of Maryland, College Park
14	August 13, 1985	utexas.edu	University of Texas at Austin
15	August 20, 1985	usc.edu	University of Southern California
16	September 30, 1985	wisc.edu	University of Wisconsin–Madison
16	September 30, 1985	uci.edu	University of California, Irvine
18	October 4, 1985	stanford.edu	Stanford University
19	October 7, 1985	umich.edu	University of Michigan
20	December 9, 1985	ucsd.edu	University of California, San Diego
21	January 6, 1986	caltech.edu	California Institute of Technology
22	January 23, 1986	arizona.edu	University of Arizona
23	February 21, 1986	ucsf.edu	University of California, San Francisco
24	March 3, 1986	dartmouth.edu	Dartmouth College
24	March 3, 1986	indiana.edu	Indiana University Bloomington
24	March 3, 1986	okstate.edu	Oklahoma State University
24	March 3, 1986	unlv.edu	University of Nevada, Las Vegas
24	March 3, 1986	wfu.edu	Wake Forest University
24	March 3, 1986	wright.edu	Wright State University
30	March 10, 1986	isi.edu	Information Sciences Institute
31	March 19, 1986	ucdavis.edu	University of California, Davis
31	March 19, 1986	uta.edu	University of Texas at Arlington
31	March 19, 1986	virginia.edu	University of Virginia
34	March 25, 1986	ufl.edu	University of Florida
34	March 25, 1986	bu.edu	Boston University
34	March 25, 1986	rpi.edu	Rensselaer Polytechnic Institute
34	March 25, 1986	umass.edu	University of Massachusetts Amherst
34	March 25, 1986	northeastern.edu	Northeastern University
40	May 8, 1986	gatech.edu	Georgia Institute of Technology
40	May 8, 1986	toronto.edu	University of Toronto
40	May 8, 1986	sju.edu	Saint Joseph's University
40	May 8, 1986	uab.edu	University of Alabama at Birmingham
44	June 2, 1986	carleton.edu	Carleton College
44	June 2, 1986	duke.edu	Duke University
44	June 2, 1986	upenn.edu	University of Pennsylvania
44	June 2, 1986	emory.edu	Emory University
44	June 2, 1986	bgsu.edu	Bowling Green State University
44	June 2, 1986	colorado.edu	University of Colorado Boulder
50	June 17, 1986	unc.edu	University of North Carolina at Chapel Hill
51	July 10, 1986	usd.edu	University of South Dakota
51	July 10, 1986	uwp.edu	University of Wisconsin–Parkside
51	July 10, 1986	wellesley.edu	Wellesley College
51	July 10, 1986	wku.edu	Western Kentucky University
55	July 14, 1986	psu.edu	Pennsylvania State University
56	August 27, 1986	brown.edu	Brown University
56	August 27, 1986	unm.edu	University of New Mexico
58	September 2, 1986	syr.edu	Syracuse University
58	September 2, 1986	depaul.edu	DePaul University
60	September 4, 1986	washington.edu	University of Washington
60	September 4, 1986	wcslc.edu	Westminster College (university since 2023)
62	September 29, 1986	moravian.edu	Moravian College
62	September 29, 1986	unt.edu	University of North Texas
62	September 29, 1986	usf.edu	University of South Florida
62	September 29, 1986	williams.edu	Williams College
66	October 3, 1986	merit.edu	Merit Network
67	October 8, 1986	nyu.edu	New York University
68	October 10, 1986	rochester.edu	University of Rochester
69	October 27, 1986	unh.edu	University of New Hampshire
69	October 27, 1986	ucf.edu	University of Central Florida
69	October 27, 1986	hawaii.edu	University of Hawaii
69	October 27, 1986	csufresno.edu	California State University, Fresno
73	November 5, 1986	georgetown.edu	Georgetown University
73	November 5, 1986	muskingum.edu	Muskingum University
73	November 5, 1986	odu.edu	Old Dominion University
76	November 17, 1986	usma.edu	United States Military Academy
77	November 21, 1986	clarkson.edu	Clarkson University
78	December 11, 1986	oberlin.edu	Oberlin College
78	December 11, 1986	ohiou.edu	Ohio University
78	December 11, 1986	unr.edu	University of Nevada, Reno
81	December 16, 1986	utah.edu	University of Utah
82	January 19, 1987	byu.edu	Brigham Young University
82	January 19, 1987	lsu.edu	Louisiana State University
84	January 21, 1987	umn.edu	University of Minnesota
85	January 29, 1987	ucsc.edu	University of California, Santa Cruz
86	February 19, 1987	bsu.edu	Ball State University
86	February 19, 1987	csuchico.edu	California State University, Chico
86	February 19, 1987	kent.edu	Kent State University
86	February 19, 1987	clemson.edu	Clemson University
90	February 27, 1987	albany.edu	University at Albany
91	March 2, 1987	whoi.edu	Woods Hole Oceanographic Institution
92	March 4, 1987	mu.edu	Marquette University
93	March 17, 1987	yale.edu	Yale University
94	March 19, 1987	jhu.edu	Johns Hopkins University
95	April 2, 1987	rockefeller.edu	The Rockefeller University
96	April 3, 1987	princeton.edu	Princeton University
97	April 4, 1987	yu.edu	Yeshiva University
98	April 14, 1987	wsu.edu	Washington State University
98	April 14, 1987	wwu.edu	Western Washington University
98	April 14, 1987	uvm.edu	University of Vermont
98	April 14, 1987	tulane.edu	Tulane University

== .net ==
Rank	Date of registration	Domain	Registered to
0	January 1, 1985	darpa.net	DARPA
1	January 1, 1985	nordu.net	Nordic Infrastructure for Research and Education
2	April 1, 1986	broken.net	Jason Matthews
3	November 5, 1986	nsf.net	National Science Foundation Network
4	January 27, 1987	nyser.net	New York State Education and Research Network
5	May 20, 1987	uu.net	UUNET
6	July 21, 1987	sesqui.net	Sesquicentennial Network (SESQUINet)
7	May 25, 1988	mr.net	Minnesota Regional Network (MRNet)
8	June 9, 1988	oar.net	Ohio Academic Resources Network
9	July 8, 1988	sura.net	Southeastern Universities Research Association
10	September 7, 1988	the.net	Texas Higher Education Network (THEnet)
11	September 16, 1988	nwnet.net	NorthWestNet
12	October 21, 1988	es.net	Energy Sciences Network
13	October 25, 1988	mid.net	MIDnet
14	January 4, 1989	barrnet.net	Bay Area Regional Research Network (BARRNet)
15	January 5, 1989	cic.net	CICNet
16	January 27, 1989	hawaii.net	
17	March 7, 1989	psi.net	PSINet
18	March 27, 1989	near.net	New England Academic and Research Network
19	April 11, 1989	eu.net	EUnet
20	June 29, 1989	ln.net	
21	September 12, 1989	sub.net	
22	September 14, 1989	westnet.net	Westnet
23	November 6, 1989	cypress.net	
24	November 15, 1989	cerf.net	California Education and Research Federation Network
25	November 17, 1989	risq.net	Réseau d'informations scientifiques du Québec
26	February 9, 1990	ca.net	CANARIE
27	May 21, 1990	wiscnet.net	WiscNet
28	July 25, 1990	cent.net	
29	July 26, 1990	alter.net	
30	September 27, 1990	ans.net	Advanced Network and Services
31	November 7, 1990	mich.net	Merit Network
32	February 26, 1991	hk.net	
33	April 10, 1991	cix.net	
34	April 11, 1991	team.net	
35	May 7, 1991	five-colleges.net	Five College Consortium
36	May 17, 1991	ja.net	JANET
37	June 3, 1991	illinois.net	
38	June 20, 1991	more.net	
39	June 24, 1991	ohio-dmz.net	
40	July 8, 1991	icp.net	
41	August 7, 1991	swip.net	
42	August 15, 1991	michnet.net	
43	November 29, 1991	notes.net	
44	December 10, 1991	merit.net	Merit Network
45	December 31, 1991	mu.net	
46	January 17, 1992	first.net	
47	February 17, 1992	ebone.net	
48	February 19, 1992	holonet.net	
49	February 25, 1992	ripe.net	RIPE
50	March 24, 1992	csn.net	
51	April 6, 1992	mcast.net	
52	April 8, 1992	life.net	
53	April 20, 1992	rahul.net	
54	April 21, 1992	cyber.net	
55	May 11, 1992	sprintlink.net	
56	May 18, 1992	ids.net	
57	May 21, 1992	q.net	
58	June 1, 1992	netconnect.net	
59	July 7, 1992	use.net	
60	July 16, 1992	tip.net	
61	July 27, 1992	capcon.net	
62	July 27, 1992	nexsys.net	
63	July 29, 1992	umass.net	
64	July 31, 1992	solinet.net	
65	August 6, 1992	fish.net	
66	August 18, 1992	ps.net	
67	September 10, 1992	eds.net	
68	September 18, 1992	lig.net	
69	October 1, 1992	ix.net	
70	October 19, 1992	aol.net	
71	October 30, 1992	win.net	
72	November 2, 1992	cren.net	
73	November 3, 1992	path.net	
74	November 4, 1992	quake.net	
75	November 20, 1992	access.net	
76	November 20, 1992	tsoft.net	
77	November 23, 1992	inter.net	
78	November 30, 1992	individual.net	
79	December 4, 1992	raider.net	
80	December 9, 1992	europa.net	
81	December 21, 1992	demon.net	
82	December 22, 1992	press.net	
83	December 23, 1992	bc.net	
84	January 1, 1993	internic.net	InterNIC
85	January 4, 1993	cls.net	
86	January 20, 1993	sam.net	
87	February 9, 1993	kanren.net	
88	February 11, 1993	ubs.net	
89	February 15, 1993	digex.net	
90	February 15, 1993	mobilecomm.net	
91	February 17, 1993	xlink.net	
92	February 18, 1993	fr.net	
93	March 3, 1993	onenet.net	
94	March 8, 1993	aco.net	
95	March 24, 1993	clark.net	
96	March 24, 1993	olympus.net	
97	March 24, 1993	satlink.net	
98	April 2, 1993	netcom.net	
99	April 7, 1993	nl.net	
100	April 13, 1993	ins.net	

== .mil ==
Rank	Date of registration	Domain	Registered to
0	January 1, 1985	mil	Defense Data Network

== .gov ==
Rank	Date of registration	Domain	Registered to
0	January 1, 1985	gov	DARPA
1	June 1985	css.gov	Central Security Service

== .int ==
Rank	Date of registration	Domain	Registered to
0	November 3, 1988	int	Internet Assigned Numbers Authority
1	October 10, 1995	ffa.int	Pacific Islands Forum Fisheries Agency
2	October 13, 1995	ip6.int	Internet Assigned Numbers Authority
3	May 17, 1996	commonwealth.int	Commonwealth of Nations
3	May 17, 1996	nsap.int	Internet Assigned Numbers Authority
3	May 17, 1996	ymca.int	Young Men's Christian Association
6	July 8, 1996	itu.int	International Telecommunication Union
6	July 8, 1996	reliefweb.int	ReliefWeb
8	August 8, 1996	tpc.int	The Phone Company
9	August 17, 1996	adsn.int	Internet Assigned Numbers Authority
10	August 20, 1996	cto.int	Commonwealth Telecommunications Organisation
11	August 23, 1996	esa.int	European Space Agency
12	September 18, 1996	wipo.int	World Intellectual Property Organization
13	September 26, 1996	ohr.int	Office of the High Representative in Bosnia and Herzegovina
14	December 5, 1996	iai.int	Inter-American Institute for Global Change Research
15	December 24, 1996	sadc.int	Southern African Development Community
16	December 27, 1996	ecb.int	European Central Bank
17	January 14, 1997	eu.int	European Union
18	February 12, 1997	oie.int	World Organisation for Animal Health
19	February 24, 1997	iom.int	International Organisation for Migration
20	March 1, 1997	interpol.int	International Criminal Police Organization
21	April 23, 1997	un.int	United Nations
22	May 20, 1997	comesa.int	Common Market for Eastern and Southern Africa
23	August 26, 1997	nato.int	North Atlantic Treaty Organization
24	August 31, 1997	ices.int	International Council for the Exploration of the Sea
25	October 1, 1997	weu.int	Western European Union
26	October 10, 1997	ecmwf.int	European Centre for Medium-Range Weather Forecasts
27	October 24, 1997	coe.int	Council of Europe
28	October 27, 1997	efta.int	European Free Trade Association
29	November 10, 1997	upov.int	International Union for the Protection of New Varieties of Plants
30	January 28, 1998	idea.int	International Institute for Democracy and Electoral Assistance
31	January 29, 1998	iaea.int	International Atomic Energy Agency
31	January 29, 1998	icao.int	International Civil Aviation Organization
31	January 29, 1998	upu.int	Universal Postal Union
34	June 5, 1998	who.int	World Health Organisation
35	September 25, 1998	bceao.int	Central Bank of West African States
35	September 25, 1998	emep.int	Convention on Long-Range Transboundary Air Pollution
35	September 25, 1998	idb.int	Inter-American Development Bank
35	September 25, 1998	iic.int	Inter-American Investment Corporation
39	September 29, 2000	uemoa.int	West African Economic and Monetary Union
39	September 29, 2000	unccd.int	United Nations Convention to Combat Desertification
41	September 10, 2001	apnic.int	Asia-Pacific Network Information Centre
41	September 10, 2001	atma.int	Internet Assigned Numbers Authority
41	September 10, 2001	basel.int	Basel Convention
41	September 10, 2001	beac.int	Bank of Central African States
41	September 10, 2001	ecowas.int	Economic Community of West African States
41	September 10, 2001	era.int	Academy of European Law
41	September 10, 2001	eurocontrol.int	European Organisation for the Safety of Air Navigation
41	September 10, 2001	ilo.int	International Labour Organization
41	September 10, 2001	inbar.int	International Network for Bamboo and Rattan
41	September 10, 2001	ippc.int	International Plant Protection Convention
41	September 10, 2001	issa.int	International Social Security Association
41	September 10, 2001	ivi.int	International Vaccine Institute
41	September 10, 2001	kedo.int	Internet Assigned Numbers Authority
41	September 10, 2001	nasco.int	North Atlantic Salmon Conservation Organization
41	September 10, 2001	nato-pa.int	NATO Parliamentary Assembly
41	September 10, 2001	nib.int	Nordic Investment Bank
41	September 10, 2001	oecd.int	Organisation for Economic Co-Operation and Development
41	September 10, 2001	oiv.int	International Organisation of Vine and Wine
41	September 10, 2001	pic.int	Rotterdam Convention
41	September 10, 2001	pices.int	North Pacific Marine Science Organization
41	September 10, 2001	redcross.int	International Federation of Red Cross and Red Crescent Societies
41	September 10, 2001	spc.int	Pacific Community
41	September 10, 2001	unesco.int	United Nations Education, Scientific and Cultural Organization
41	September 10, 2001	unfccc.int	United Nations Framework Convention on Climate Change
41	September 10, 2001	worldbank.int	The World Bank
41	September 10, 2001	wto.int	World Trade Organization
67	October 11, 2001	ifad.int	International Fund for Agricultural Development
67	October 11, 2001	iica.int	Inter-American Institute for Cooperation on Agriculture
69	October 16, 2001	eumetsat.int	European Organisation for the Exploitation of Meteorological Satellites
69	October 16, 2001	wmo.int	World Meteorological Organization
71	October 18, 2001	itso.int	International Telecommunications Satellite Organization
72	November 5, 2001	oas.int	Organization of American States
73	June 7, 2002	cde.int	Centre for the Development of Enterprise
73	June 7, 2002	cta.int	Technical Centre for Agricultural and Rural Cooperation ACP-EU
73	June 7, 2002	ectel.int	Eastern Caribbean Telecommunications Authority
76	August 27, 2002	eurofish.int	Eurofish
77	September 4, 2002	stcu.int	Science and Technology Center in Ukraine
78	September 13, 2002	pops.int	Stockholm Convention on Persistent Organic Pollutants
79	October 18, 2002	idlo.int	International Development Law Organization
80	November 1, 2002	eftasurv.int	European Free Trade Association Surveillance Authority
81	November 19, 2002	las.int	League of Arab States
82	January 23, 2003	eac.int	East African Community
83	March 6, 2003	icc-cpi.int	International Criminal Court
84	April 30, 2003	col.int	The Commonwealth of Learning
85	May 1, 2003	cbd.int	Convention on Biological Diversity
86	May 20, 2003	iccat.int	International Commission for the Conservation of Atlantic Tunas
86	May 20, 2003	oiml.int	International Organization of Legal Metrology
88	May 21, 2003	epo.int	European Patent Office
88	May 21, 2003	eutelsatigo.int	European Telecommunications Satellite Organization
88	May 21, 2003	nafo.int	Northwest Atlantic Fisheries Organization
91	October 1, 2003	mercosur.int	Southern Common Market
92	October 17, 2003	acp.int	African, Caribbean and Pacific Group of States
92	October 17, 2003	cms.int	Convention on the Conservation of Migratory Species of Wild Animals
94	January 13, 2004	glfc.int	Great Lakes Fishery Commission
95	January 16, 2004	ctbto.int	Preparatory Commission for the Comprehensive Nuclear-Test-Ban
96	June 30, 2005	apt.int	Asia-Pacific Telecommunity
97	July 28, 2005	cospas-sarsat.int	International Cospas-Sarsat Programme
98	August 16, 2005	iho.int	International Hydrographic Organization
99	December 1, 2005	cedare.int	Centre for Environment and Development for the Arab Region and Europe
100	January 18, 2006	sica.int	Central American Integration System

== .arpa ==
Rank	Date of registration	Domain	Registered to
0	January 1, 1985	arpa	Internet Architecture Board (originally used by DARPA)
1	September 27, 1994	in-addr.arpa	Internet Architecture Board
2	September 14, 2000	e164.arpa	Internet Architecture Board
3	November 10, 2001	ip6.arpa	Internet Architecture Board
4	October 1, 2002	uri.arpa	Internet Architecture Board
4	October 1, 2002	urn.arpa	Internet Architecture Board
6	August 29, 2006	iris.arpa	Internet Architecture Board
7	April 29, 2010	in-addr-servers.arpa	Internet Architecture Board
7	April 29, 2010	ip6-servers.arpa	Internet Architecture Board
9	September 30, 2013	ipv4only.arpa	Internet Architecture Board
10	January 21, 2015	as112.arpa	Internet Architecture Board
11	March 15, 2018	home.arpa	Internet Architecture Board
