= Transverter =

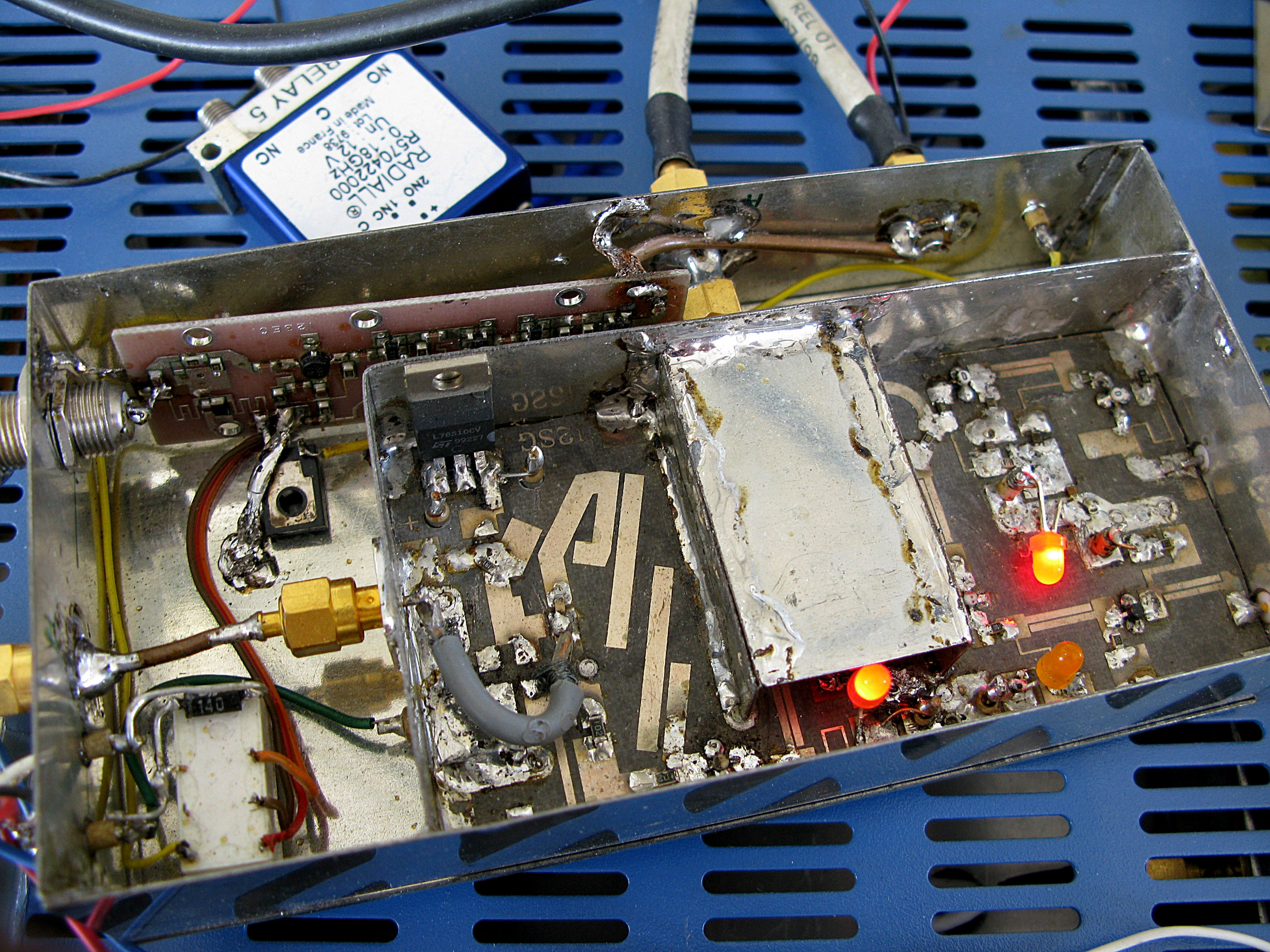
A transverter for ATV operation on 5.7 GHz

In radio engineering, a transverter is a radio frequency device that consists of an upconverter and a downconverter in one unit. Transverters are used in conjunction with transceivers to change the range of frequencies over which the transceiver can communicate.

In electrical power engineering, a transverter is a universal electrical power converter that can combine, convert, analyze and control any combinations of DC or AC power.

== Amateur radio use ==
Although not as convenient as a wide-range radio, amateurs who have invested a great deal of money or time in a fine-quality radio may find it more economical to extend the radio's range when new bands become available, rather than replace it. Some transceiver manufacturers are supportive of add-on transverters, and design in circuitry and cabling attachments for them.

=== High band use ===
Transverters are most commonly used in amateur radio to convert radio transceivers designed for use on the HF or VHF bands to operate on even higher frequency (microwave) bands. A transceiver used in this fashion is referred to as an IF radio, indicating that it connects into the "intermediate frequency" electronics in the chain of transceiver stages.

Common transceiver/transverter combinations include transverters for 50 MHz, 70 MHz, 144 MHz, 222 MHz, and 432 MHz designed for use with 28 MHz IF radios, and transverters for 50 MHz, 902 MHz, 1296 MHz, 2304 MHz, 3456 MHz, 5706 MHz, and 10368 MHz designed for use with 144 MHz IF radios. Some transverters include transmit/receive switching built into the design, whereas other units require external switching. The use of external switching is popular in applications where preamps and amplifiers are included.

Some transverters are built into waterproof enclosures for installation on a radio tower or other antenna support structure to get the device as close as possible to the antenna so as to reduce signal loss in the transmission line.

The high-speed multimedia radio article discusses the radio transceivers that use 802.11 (WiFi) with transverters to achieve Wireless Broadband communication in the frequency bands reserved for Amateur radio operators.

=== Low band use ===
Transverters can also be used in applications where the transverter frequency is lower than the transceiver frequency, and the design constraints in these cases are often more relaxed. Several low frequency bands are available around the world to amateur radio operators, licensed experimental stations, and some unlicensed hobbyists. Transverters for these LF bands generally use HF transceivers as the IF radio.

Some transverters are used for communications where one or more of the stations are underground, such as mines, or underwater, such as shallow-water submersibles.

== Energy conversion use ==
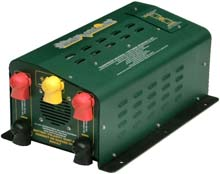
A transverter power module for energy conversion, 2000 Watt, HT2000.

Historically "transverter" was the name for an electromechanical device, invented in Britain in the 1920s, to produce high-voltage direct current from AC sources for efficient power distribution over long-distance lines.

Modern transverters are even more versatile, and generally all solid-state. They are used to convert and combine different types of electrical power such as solar panels, batteries, wind generators, fuel cells, the grid, generators, and both DC and AC loads. By automatically analyzing and converting the power between different voltages and AC or DC, the transverter enables energy to flow between all types of devices.

With the advent of the Smart Grid transverters are becoming very popular since they combine renewable energy, demand management, and community energy storage within the home or office. Transverters also locally correct for power factor, which creates significant reductions in transmission loss for the grid.
