= 5cm =

5cm may refer to:

- The 5 centimeters band, a radio frequency band in the United States
- An imprint of Hong Kong clothing company I.T
- 5 Centimeters Per Second, a Japanese anime film
- 5 cm (film), an Indonesian film
