= Second-level domain =

Domain that is directly below a top-level domain

In the Domain Name System (DNS) hierarchy, a second-level domain (SLD or 2LD) is a domain that is directly below a top-level domain (TLD). For example, in example.com, example is the second-level domain of the .com TLD.

Second-level domains commonly refer to the organization that registered the domain name with a domain name registrar. Some domain name registries introduce a second-level hierarchy to a TLD that indicates the type of entity intended to register an SLD under it. For example, in the .uk namespace a college or other academic institution would register under the .ac.uk ccSLD, while companies would register under .co.uk. Strictly speaking, domains like .ac.uk and .in.net and .co.uk are second level domain themselves, since they are directly below a TLD in the hierarchy. A list of Internet top-level domains (TLDs) can be found at the IANA. An ordinal-free term to denote domains under which people can register their own domain name is public suffix domain (PSD).

== Country-code second-level domains ==
=== Austria ===
In Austria there are two second-level domains available for the public:

- .co.at intended for commercial enterprises
- .or.at intended for organizations.

The second-level domain

- .priv.at is restricted to Austrian citizens only, while
- .ac.at and .gv.at are reserved for educational institutions and governmental bodies respectively.

=== Bangladesh ===
- .com.bd, .net.bd and .org.bd is open for registration for all Bangladeshi citizens and companies.
- .edu.bd and .ac.bd is open for all kinds of educational institutions in Bangladesh.
- .info.bd is restricted for personal use.
- .co.bd is open for companies or agencies. But presently not available for registration.
- .gov.bd is restricted to the government entities.
- .mil.bd is restricted for military use.
- .tv.bd is open for broadcasting and media agencies.

=== France ===
In France, there are various second-level domains available for certain sectors, including

- .avocat.fr for attorneys,
- .aeroport.fr for airports and
- .veterinaire.fr for vets.

=== Nigeria ===
- com.ng – open domain, commercial entities and businesses
- org.ng – semi-open domain, non-commercial organizations
- gov.ng – closed domain, governmental organizations
- edu.ng – closed domain, degree awarding institutions
- net.ng – closed domain, ISP infrastructure
- sch.ng – closed domain, secondary schools
- name.ng – open domain, individuals
- mobi.ng – open domain, suitable for mobile devices
- mil.ng – closed domain (Nigerian military establishments only)
- i.ng – open domain, any purpose

=== India ===
As of 2005, liberalised policies for the .in domain allow unlimited second-level registrations under .in. Unlimited registrations under the previously structured existing zones are also allowed:

- .in (available to anyone; used by companies, individuals, and organisations in India)
- .co.in (intended for banks, registered companies, and trademarks)
- .com.in (available to anyone; used by companies, individuals, and organisations in India)
- .firm.in (intended for shops, partnerships, liaison offices, sole proprietorships)
- .net.in (intended for Internet service providers)
- .org.in (intended for nonprofit organisations)
- .gen.in (intended for general/miscellaneous use)
- .ind.in (intended for individuals)

Zones reserved for use by qualified institutions in India:

- .ernet.in (Older, for both educational and research institutes)
- .ac.in (Academic institutions)

Before the introduction of liberalised registration policies for the .in domain, only 7000 names had been registered between 1992 and 2004. As of March 2010, the number had increased to over 610,000 domain names with 60% of registrations coming from India and the rest from overseas. By October 2011, the number had surpassed 1 million domain names. As of March 2016, the number has more than doubled to over 2 million domain names.

=== Sri Lanka ===
Registrations are taken at the second level and also at the third level beneath various categorized second level names. A second-level registration automatically blocks the name from registration by anybody else under any of the third-level names.

- .com.lk: Commercial entities
- .org.lk: Noncommercial organizations
- .edu.lk: Educational sites
- .ngo.lk: Non-governmental organizations
- .soc.lk: Registered societies
- .web.lk: Web sites
- .ltd.lk: Limited liability companies
- .assn.lk: Associations
- .grp.lk: Groups of companies
- .hotel.lk: Hotels

=== Trinidad and Tobago ===
- co.tt
- com.tt
- org.tt
- net.tt
- travel.tt
- museum.tt
- aero.tt
- tel.tt
- name.tt
- charity.tt
- mil.tt
- edu.tt
- gov.tt

=== Turkey ===
In Turkey, domain registrations, including the registration of second-level domains is administrated by TRABİS. There 22 active second-level domains under the .tr TLD. The registration of domains is restricted to Turkish individuals and businesses, or foreign companies with a business activity in Turkey. Second-level domains include .com.tr for commercial ventures, .edu.tr for academic institutions and .name.tr for personal use. Turkey second-level domains include:

- gov.tr (reserved for the Government of Turkey and state institutions/organizations)
- mil.tr (reserved for the Turkish Armed Forces; retired in 2010 and replaced by tsk.tr)
- tsk.tr (reserved for the Turkish Armed Forces; used since 2010)
- k12.tr (reserved for schools approved by the Ministry of National Education)
- edu.tr (reserved for higher education institutions approved by the Council of Higher Education)
- av.tr (reserved for freelance lawyers, law firms and attorney partnerships)
- dr.tr (reserved for medical doctors, medical partnerships, hospitals, and healthcare services)
- bel.tr (reserved for provincial, district, and town municipal organizations and governments)
- pol.tr (reserved for the General Directorate of Security and police)
- kep.tr (reserved for Registered Electronic Mail Service Providers [KEPHS] authorized by the Information and Communication Technologies Authority)
- com.tr (intended for commercial entities)
- net.tr (reserved for network operators/providers, as well as internet-related access services such as portals, e-mail, etc.)
- org.tr (reserved for nonprofit entities such as foundations, associations, and non-governmental organizations)
- info.tr (intended for informational websites)
- bbs.tr (reserved for entities providing BBS services)
- nom.tr (reserved for individual/personal use)
- tv.tr (reserved for entities in the television industry)
- biz.tr (intended for commercial entities)
- tel.tr (reserved for use in connection with Turkish telephone numbers)
- gen.tr (general use)
- web.tr (general use)
- name.tr (reserved for individual/personal use)

=== Ukraine ===
Ukraine second-level domains include:

- .gov.ua – available for government agencies.
- .com.ua – for commercial use.
- .in.ua – for commercial use.
- .org.ua – intended for non-profit organizations.
- .net.ua – intended for Internet providers.
- .edu.ua – for academic institutions.

There are also numerous geographic names.

=== United States ===
A two-letter second-level domain is formally reserved for each U.S. state, federal territory, and the District of Columbia.

== Historic second-level domains ==
There are several second-level domains which are no longer available.

=== Australia ===
Second-level domains under .au which are no longer available include: .conf.au originally intended for conferences; .gw.au for the Australian Academic and Research networks; info.au for general information, .otc.au and .telememo.au for the X.400 mail systems.

=== Canada ===
Prior to 12 Oct 2010 there were second level domain based on province: .ab.ca — Alberta, .bc.ca — British Columbia, .mb.ca — Manitoba, .nb.ca — New Brunswick, .nf.ca — Newfoundland, .nl.ca — Newfoundland and Labrador, .ns.ca — Nova Scotia, .nt.ca — Northwest Territories, .nu.ca — Nunavut, .on.ca — Ontario, .pe.ca — Prince Edward Island, .qc.ca — Quebec, .sk.ca — Saskatchewan, .yk.ca — Yukon

Since 2010, some have been replaced (for example, alberta.ca) while others have remained under the provincial two letter SLD (e.g., Calgary Board of Education www.cbe.ab.ca) and others were moved to more traditional subdomains (www.transportation.alberta.ca).

=== France ===
Historic second-level domains for France included: .tm.fr (for brands), .com.fr (for commercial use) and .asso.fr.

=== The Netherlands ===
Historic second-level domains for the Netherlands included: .co.nl (for commercial use)

=== Yugoslavia ===
In 2006 the .yu ccTLD was replaced by .rs (for Serbia) and .me (for Montenegro). Second-level domains under .yu included: .ac.yu – for academic institutions, .co.yu for commercial enterprises; .org.yu for organizations and .cg.yu for residents of Montenegro. Only legal entities were allowed to register names under .yu and its second-level domains.

=== Tuvalu ===
Historic second-level domains for Tuvalu included: co.tv

== Legal issues ==
As a result of ICANN's generic top-level domain (gTLD) expansion, the risk of domain squatting has increased significantly. For example, based on current regulations, the registration of the gTLDs .olympics or .redcross is not allowed; however, the registration of sites such as olympics.example or redcross.example is not controlled. Experts say that further restrictions are needed for second-level domains under the new gTLD .health, as well. For example, second-level domains under .tobacco.health or .diet.health can be easily misused by companies and therefore are a potential threat to Internet users.

== See also ==
- Single-letter second-level domains
- Domain Name System
- Top-level domain
- Country code top-level domain
- Subdomain
- Private sub-domain registry
- Public Suffix List
- .ac (second-level domain)
- .edu (second-level domain)
