= AMPRNet =

Amateur radio digital communications system

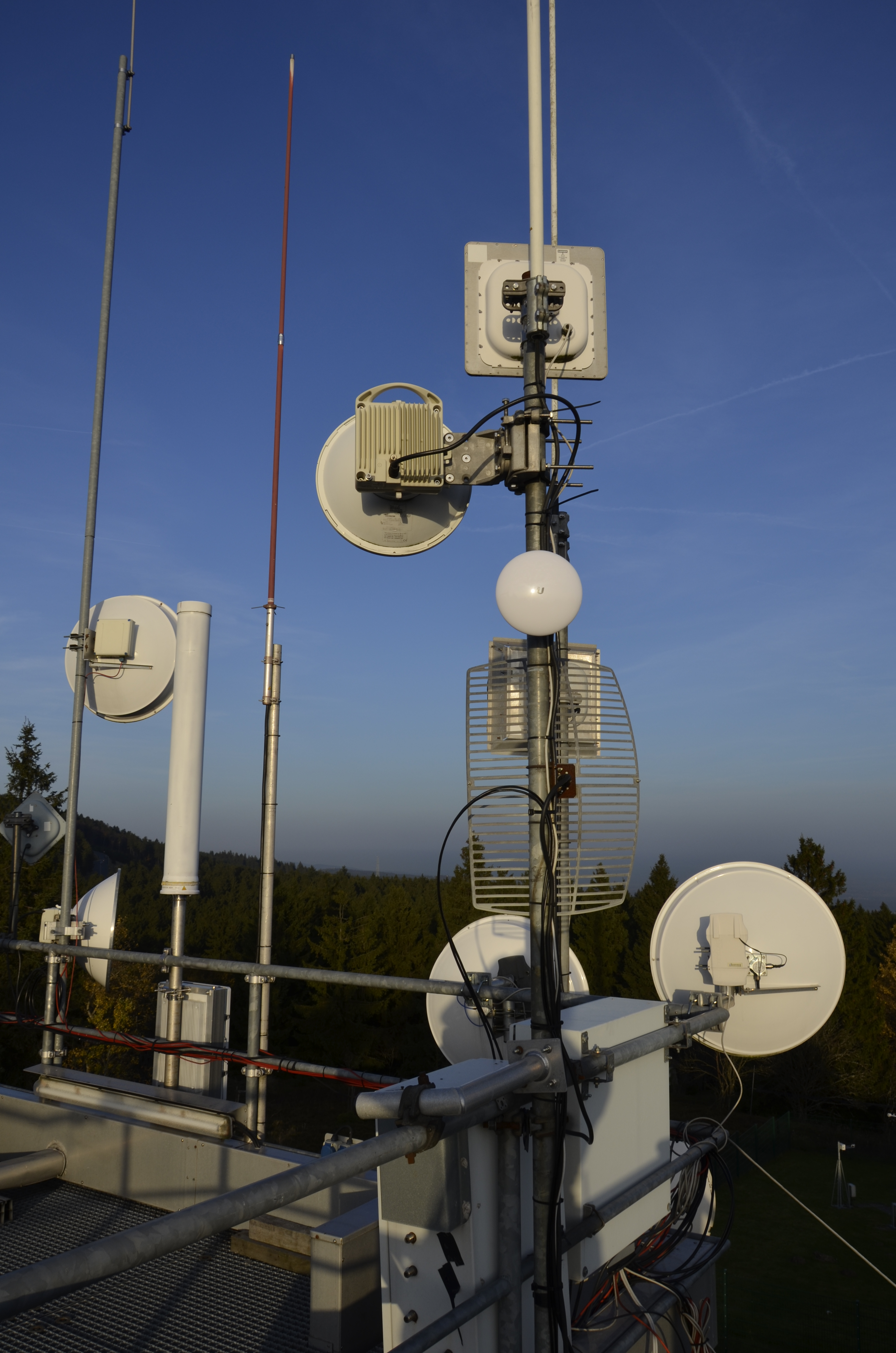
Antennas for High-speed Amateur-radio Multimedia Network (HamNET) in Europe, part of the AMPRNet wireless mesh network

The AMPRNet (AMateur Packet Radio Network) or Network 44 is used in amateur radio for packet radio and digital communications between computer networks managed by amateur radio operators. Like other amateur radio frequency allocations, an IP range of 44.0.0.0/8 was provided in 1981 for Amateur Radio Digital Communications (a generic term) and self-administered by radio amateurs. In 2001, undocumented and dual-use of 44.0.0.0/8 as a network telescope began, recording the spread of the Code Red II worm in July 2001. In mid-2019, part of IPv4 range was sold off for conventional use, due to IPv4 address exhaustion.

== Protocol ==
Beginning on 1 May 1978, the Canadian authorities allowed radio amateurs on the 1.25-meter band (220 MHz) to use packet radio, and later in 1978 announced the "Amateur Digital Radio Operator's Certificate". Discussion on digital communication amateur radio modes, using the Internet protocol suite and 44/8 IPv4 addresses followed subsequently.

By 1988, one thousand assignments of address space had been made. As of December 2009 approximately 1% of inbound traffic volume to the 44/8 network was legitimate radio amateur traffic that could be routed onwards, with the remaining 2‒100 gigabyte per day of Internet background noise being diverted and logged by the University of California San Diego (UCSD) internet telescope for research purposes. By 2016, the European-based High-speed Amateur-radio Multimedia NETwork (HAMNET) offered a multi-megabit Internet Protocol network with 4,000 nodes, covering central Europe.

=== History and design ===
The use of the Internet protocols TCP/IP on amateur (ham) radio occurred early in Internet history, preceding the public Internet by over a decade. In 1981, Hank Magnuski obtained the class A 44/8 netblock of 16.7 million IP addresses for amateur radio users worldwide. This was prior to Internet flag day (1 January 1983) when the ARPANET Network Control Protocol (NCP) was replaced by the Transmission Control Protocol (TCP). The initial name used by Jon Postel in RFC 790 was the "Amateur Radio Experiment Net".

Originally the amateur link layer protocol AX.25 carried several competing higher level protocols, with TCP/IP a minority due to the complexity of the configuration and the high protocol overhead. Very few systems operated over HF for this reason. One approach for 1,200/9,600-baud VHF/UHF operation emerged as TCP/IP over ROSE (Radio Amateur Telecommunications Society "RATS" Open Systems Environment, based on X.25 CCITT standard). Within just a few years the public Internet made these solutions obsolete. The ROSE system today is maintained by the Open Source FPAC Linux project.

The AMPRNet is connected by wireless links and Internet tunnels. Due to the bandwidth limitations of the radio spectrum, 300 bit/s is normally used on HF, while VHF and UHF links are usually 1,200 bit/s to 9,600 bit/s. Mass-produced Wi-Fi access points equipment on 2.4 GHz and 5 GHz is now being used on nearby amateur frequencies to provide much faster links as HSMM or hinternet. Since it is based on IP, the AMPRNet supports the same transport and application protocols as the rest of the Internet, though there are regulatory restrictions on encryption and third-party traffic.

The AMPRNet is composed of a series of subnets throughout the world. Portions of the network have point-to-point radio links to adjacent nodes, while others are completely isolated.

Geographically dispersed radio subnets can be connected using an IP tunnel between sites with Internet connectivity. Many of these sites also have a tunnel to a central router, which routes between the 44 network and the rest of the Internet using static routing tables updated by volunteers.

As of October 2011 experimentation had moved beyond these centrally controlled static solutions, to dynamic configurations provided by peer to peer VPN systems such as n2n, and ZeroTier.

=== Address administration ===
The allocation plan agreed in late-1986 reserved half of the address space (44.0/9 or ~8 million addresses) for use within United States territory and (44.128/9, the remaining ~8 million addresses) for the rest of the world.

After the sale of 44.192.0.0/10 in 2019, the remaining Internet Protocol (IP) addresses are the 44.0.0.0/9 for USA subnets and 44.128.0.0/10 subnet for the rest of the world, available to any licensed amateur radio operator. The IP address management and assigning of addresses is done by volunteer coordinators with the proviso "we do not provide the same level of response as a commercial organisation." These addresses can possibly be made routable over the Internet if fully coordinated with the volunteer administrators. Radio amateurs wanting to request IP addresses within the AMPRNet should visit the AMPRNet Portal.

==== mirrorshades router ====
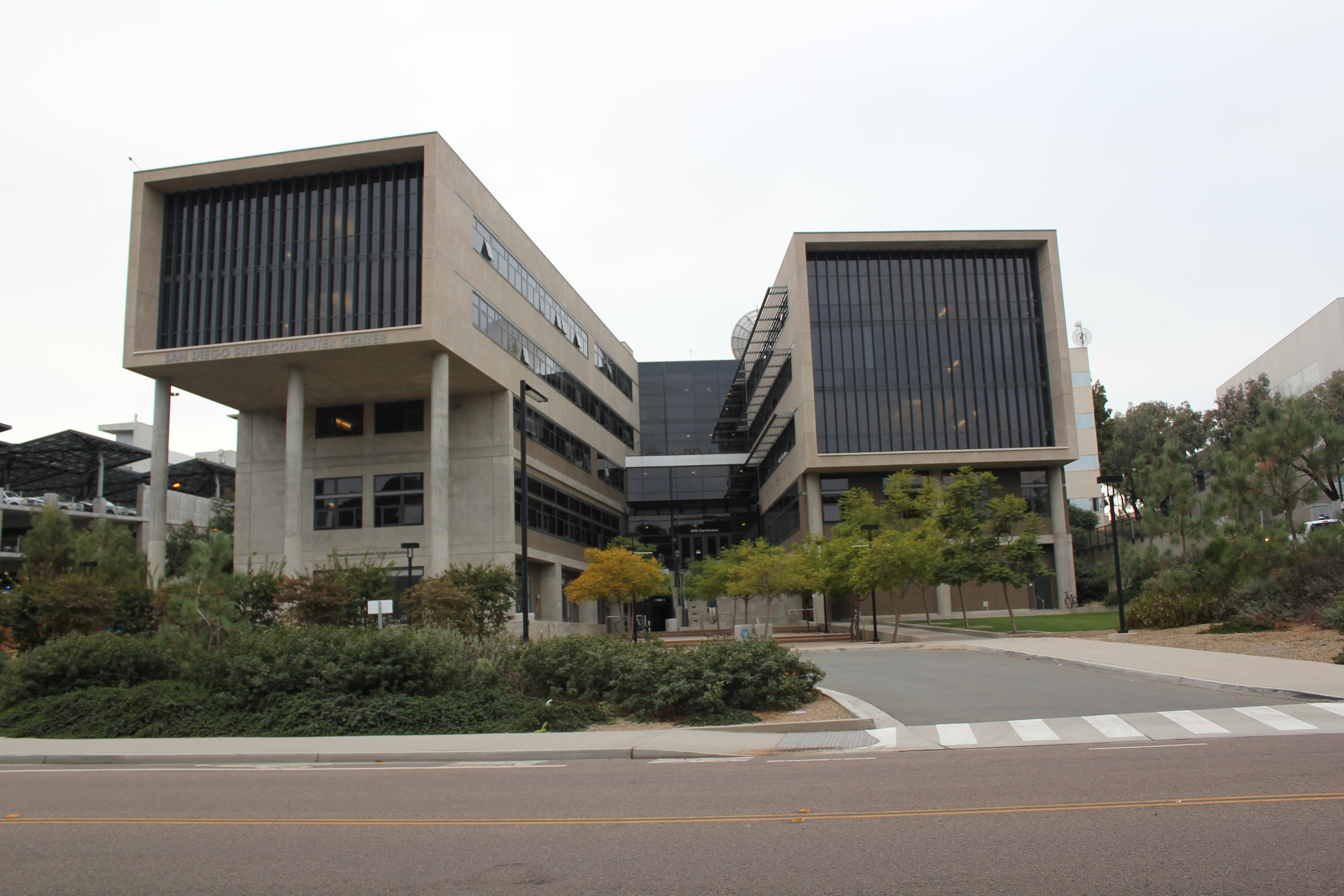
San Diego Supercomputer Center, host of AMPRNet internet gateway, and CAIDA/UCSD network telescope

Since the 1990s most packets within the 44/8 range were arranged to transit via an IP tunnel using IP in IP encapsulation to/from a router hosted at the University of California, San Diego. This forwarding router was originally named mirrorshades.ucsd.edu and later gw.ampr.org or "AmprGW".

By 1996 higher-speed 56k modems briefly had greater throughput than was possible to forward via the "mirrorshades" central reflector router and back again. Only IP addresses with an active Domain Name System (DNS) entry under ampr.org are passed by the packet filter for forwarding.

By 19 August 1999 daily encapsulated IP in IP traffic was ~100 kilobits per second, peaking to 0.14 megabits per second. During mid-2000, the majority of unique IP addresses seen on the University of California, San Diego connection from CERFnet began with the 44 prefix, except for 17% of IP addresses which did not. In mid-2009 the mirrorshades server was upgraded and replaced after about ~1,100 days uptime. A funding proposal in 2010 raised the possibility that "The legitimate traffic is also a potential research resource".

==== UCSD network telescope ====
Beginning in February 2001, as part of backscatter research and the CAIDA/UCSD network telescope project, the whole of the 44/8 address block was being advertised via the border gateway protocol (BGP) as a passive honeypot for Internet background noise and backscatter collection, based in the Center for Applied Internet Data Analysis (Note: Both "Cooperative Association for Internet Data Analysis" (CAIDA) and "Center for Applied Internet Data Analysis" (CAIDA) appear in academic texts.) at the San Diego Supercomputer Center. On 15 July 2001 the network monitoring of 44.0.0.0/8 traffic recorded the spread of the Code Red II worm. Prior to July 2001, the project had been logging unsolicited TCP SYN packets destined for IP addresses within 44.0.0.0/8; and after 19 July 2001 full incoming IP header logging took place. The 44/8 IP address block was stated to have "high value to research".

Capture data for August 2001, using data compression and retaining only IP headers was 0.5 gigabyte per hour. In 2002 the block was 0.4% of all internet IPv4 address space. By September 2003, traffic was 0.75 terabytes per month and costing $2,500 per month for bandwidth. In October 2004 Limelight Networks began to sponsor the internet transit costs of the CAIDA network telescope. In April 2009 the upstream rate limiting was removed, increasing the number of packets reaching the network telescope. At the end of 2012, seaport.caida.org was the network telescope data capture server with thor.caida.org used for near real-time data access. As of 2016, the 44/8 network was receiving backscatter from denial-of-service attacks (DoS) each measuring ~226 packets per second (mean peak average) totalling 37 terabytes per month.

Support was supplied by Cisco Systems under a University Research Board (URB) grant. The project was funded by an Advanced Networking Infrastructure and Research (ANIR) award, and Computer and Network Systems (CNS) award from the National Science Foundation (NSF); the United States Department of Homeland Security (DHS); and Network Modeling & Simulation (NMS) / Next Generation Internet Program (NGI) of the Defense Advanced Research Projects Agency (DARPA).

===== Feed =====
In May 2017, the Center for Applied Internet Data Analysis provided a new server for the AMPRNet gateway, in a different building. As of mid-2017 a passive monitoring configuration was in use, involving a network switch with port mirroring set to duplicate the incoming packets being seen by the AMPRNet gateway to the UCSD network telescope capture server. The project funding proposal for "Sustainable Tools for Analysis and Research on Darknet Unsolicited Traffic" (STARDUST) specified a planned upgrading to 10 Gigabit Ethernet with a passive optical tap, in order to provide finer timestamping and avoid packet loss.

By July 2018, the replacement 10 Gigabit Ethernet infrastructure, using an optical splitter and Endace capture card, was operational.

===== Archives =====
The archived intermittent captures for 2001‒2008 were 657 gigabytes. The archived pcap captures from 2008‒2012 were 192 terabytes of data uncompressed. In January 2012, five weeks of recent data were 5.5 terabytes uncompressed. Beginning on 22 March 2012, the raw hourly compressed pcap traces from 2003‒2012 were transferred to the National Energy Research Scientific Computing Center (NERSC) for long-term storage and research data archiving. This data migration of 104.66 tebibytes took one week at a sustained rate of 1.5 gigabits per second via the Energy Sciences Network (ESnet).

For the 2012‒2017 period, 2.85 petabytes of data was collected (1.3 petabyte compressed). As of 31 December 2017, the overall total collected by the UCSD Network Telescope stood at 3.25 petabytes (uncompressed), stored across 129,552 hourly files.

Users of the collected data up to 2012 are requested to acknowledge that "Support for Backscatter Datasets and the UCSD Network Telescope is provided by Cisco Systems, Limelight Networks, the US Department of Homeland Security, the National Science Foundation, DARPA, Digital Envoy, and CAIDA Members."

=== Block size ===
The original Class A network allocation for amateur radio was made in the 1970s, and recorded in September 1981, which consisted of ~16 million IP addresses. As of 18 July 2019, the lower 75% of the 44/8 block (~12 million addresses) remained for amateur radio usage, with the upper 25% (44.192/10, ~4 million IP address) having been sold.

Owing to IPv4 address exhaustion, by 2016 the 44/8 block was worth over $100 million. The 44/8 routing prefix aggregation stopped being advertised on 4 June 2019. John Curran, CEO of the American Registry for Internet Numbers registry stated that a request for the transfer of IP addresses had been received and reviewed in accordance with ARIN policy.

On 18 July 2019, the designation recorded by Internet Assigned Numbers Authority was altered from "044/8 Amateur Radio Digital Communications" to "044/8 Administered by ARIN". On 18 July 2019, there was a sale of 44.192.0.0/10 address space to Amazon Technologies Inc, which was the highest bidder, for use by Amazon Web Services. AMPRNet subsequently consisted of 44.0/9, and 44.128/10, with no plans to sell any more address space.

The aspiration expressed by those involved in the sale was that money be held by a non-profit 501(c)(3) organization for the advancement of amateur radio. The sale raised over $50 million. Prior to sale, addresses in the 44.192/10 block had been allocated to amateur radio areas for the outer space-amateur radio satellite service, to roaming, Oceania, Antarctica, the Arctic, Italy for Centro Italiano Sperimentazione ed Attività Radiantistiche (CisarNet) Germany for Stuttgart/Tübingen, Eppstein, plus the Germany/pan-European Highspeed Amateur-radio Multimedia NETwork (HAMNET).

==== Responses ====
Paul Vixie stated after the sale of IP address space that "ampr.org can make better use of money than IP space in fulfilling its nonprofit mission, at this stage of the game."

Doug Barton, a former manager of Internet Assigned Numbers Authority, said the "reaction that we're seeing now is 100% predictable ... that doesn't change anything about my opinion that the sale itself was totally reasonable, done by reasonable people, and in keeping with the concept of being good stewards of the space.

== Governance ==
=== Initial committee ===
An Amateur Radio Digital Communications committee was formed to offer advice on digital standards to the American Radio Relay League (ARRL) board of directors, following a meeting in 1981. The original working name was the "ARRL Ad Hoc Committee on Digital Communication", abbreviated to "digital committee". During the mid-1980s, the committee had been meeting twice per year: during the middle of the year, and again at the annual Computer Networking conference.

In September 1987, the committee recommended the list of frequencies that would be used in North America for packet radio and digital communications. In January 1988, the committee held a meeting to standardise AX.25 version 3. In March 1988, the "Packet Radio Frequency Recommendations" were published by the committee.

During early 1993 the committee and ARRL board of directors were working on guidelines for semi-automatic digital stations, with the proposals passed to the Federal Communications Commission.

=== Non-profit transition ===
Amateur Radio Digital Communications, Inc.
Year	US$, assets at end of year
2012	456($-842 equity)
2013	830($-1,584 equity)
2014	6,399($3,700 equity)
2015	6,567($3,558 equity)
2016	6,717($3,708 equity)
2017	2,621($1,731 equity)
2018	13,829($-7,855 equity)
2019	109,130,548
2020	127,858,353
2021	135,676,708
2022	107,895,897
2023	117,236,719

On 6 October 2011 a Californian non-profit company was founded with the name of "Amateur Radio Digital Communications", and recorded by the State of California on 11 October 2011 with an address of "5663 Balboa Avenue, Suite 432, San Diego, California, a UPS store address. On 22 June 2012, 29 September 2015, and 18 September 2017, filings were made listing the company officers as:

Brian Kantor
President or Chief Executive Officer
Erin Kenneally
Secretary
Kimberly Claffy
Treasurer or Chief Financial Officer

In 2011, the American Registry for Internet Numbers approved a request to change the registration of the whole 44/8 network block from an individual contact, to the "Amateur Radio Digital Communications" non-profit company.

Activities were to "conserve scarce AMPRNet Internet protocol resources, and to educate networks users on how to efficiently utilize these resources as a service to the entire Internet community" initiated "in the second half of 2012 by the President via communications with American Registry for Internet Numbers (ARIN)". Plans included "the issuance of grants and other financial support to educational institutions, foundations and other organizations. [...] expected to commence in 2013 via a joint effort of the three founding Directors [...]".

During December 2017 Kantor announced his retirement from University of California San Diego. Re-stated (changed) articles of incorporation for the "Amateur Radio Digital Communications" non-profit were signed on 13 December 2017, and filed on 17 December 2017. In May 2019, Kantor signed an agreement extending UCSD/CAIDA's use of Amprnet addresses for data collection until 31 July 2023.

Brian Kantor died in November 2019. In February/March 2020, the Center for Networked Systems (CNS) of the University of California, San Diego (UCSD) received $225,000, given by ARDC to allow financial endowment of a student scholarship in the name of Alan Turing and honouring Brian Kantor.

==== Distributions ====
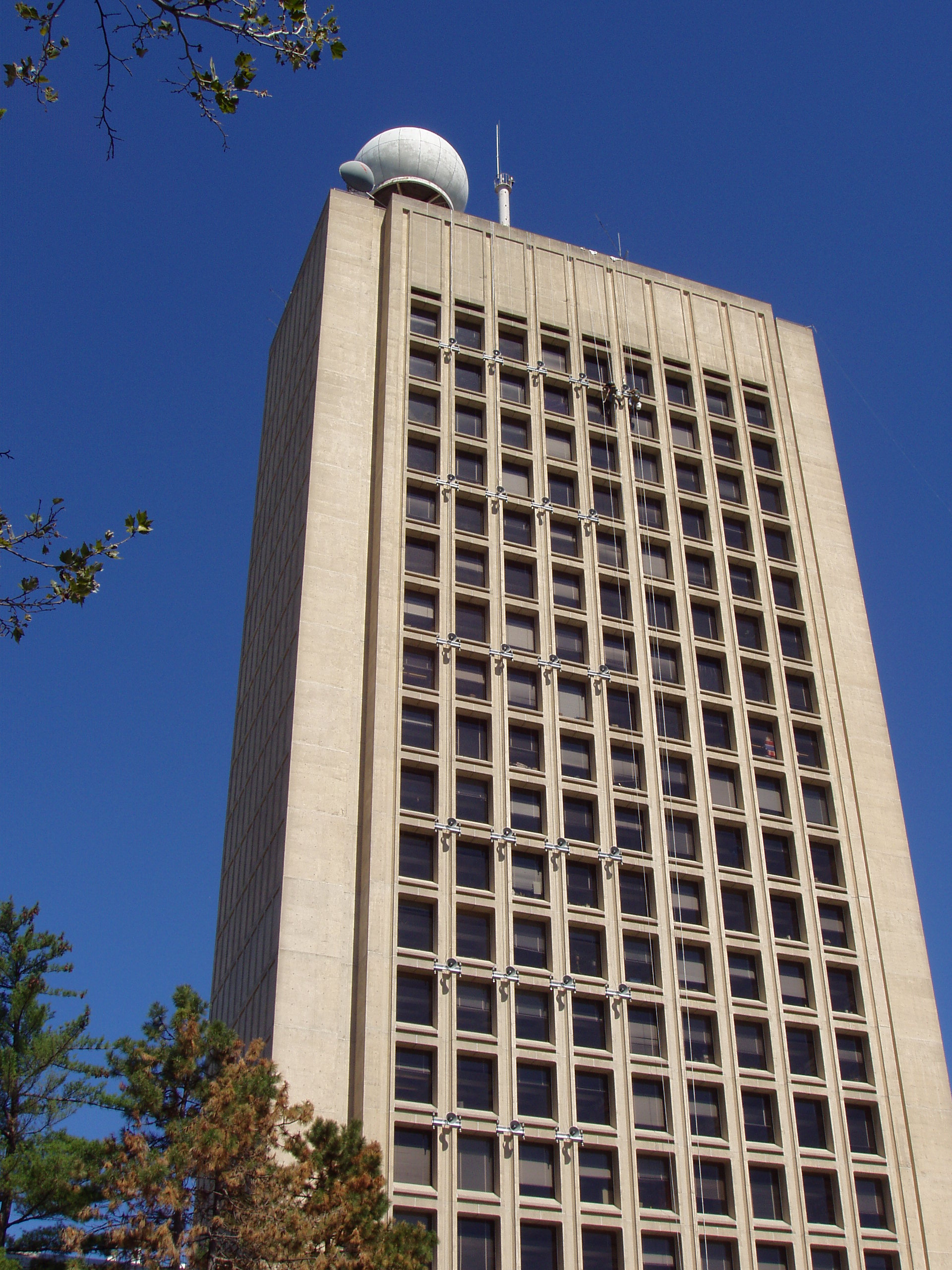
Radome on Green Building at MIT saved by ARDC support in 2021

In May 2021, ARDC provided a one-off grant of $1.6 million to the Massachusetts Institute of Technology amateur radio club (W1MX) to save and rebuild the radome on top of the MIT Green Building (building 54).

In November 2021, ARDC awarded a five-year grant, for a total of $1.3 million, to support US-based activities around Amateur Radio on the International Space Station (ARISS-USA).

===== Digital Library of Amateur Radio and Communications =====
In January 2022, the Internet Archive received a grant of $0.9 million for assembling a Digital Library of Amateur Radio and Communications (DLARC). Internet Archive began the project in earnest in September 2022, and began seeking contributions of material in October. By November 2022, the library had grown to 25,000 items. In January 2023 the library held over 51,000 items including more than 3,300 books and magazines available via controlled digital lending.

===== Other ARDC grants =====
An updated list of ARDC grants is maintained on their website at . Information on applying for a grant is at.

== See also ==
- AX.25
- High-speed multimedia radio
- Winlink
