= Student SPILL =

Student SPILL (Supporting Peers In Laidback Listening) is an anonymous and confidential peer-to-peer online support system for college students launched in December 2008. Available 24 hours a day, students can go to the Student SPILL website and vent about problems they are experiencing in an email message (a “Spill”). Student SPILL receives the message, makes the student's identity anonymous, and forwards the Spill to four to six student volunteers who are “trained in effective listening and writing empathetic responses”. Each volunteer sends a response to the student within 24 hours for free. In their response to Spills, Student Supporters provide local and national resources that may also be helpful to the Spiller. The Spilling process ends here, as all Spills are "one-shot deals".

As of February 2011, Student SPILL is available to ten post-secondary education campuses across the United States, and only students with .edu email addresses from these institutions may use the messaging service. However, Student SPILL is expanding rapidly and has affected over 1,000 students since its creation. Student SPILL also categorizes each Spill registered by the website to find unique trends to each college. At the end of a term, “Spill-using schools can leverage the data the service provides for student retention, risk mitigation, suicide prevention and to develop recommendations for services they should consider.”

Student SPILL intends to be a complement of existing counseling services and decrease the stigma associated with seeking professional help. It does not attempt to replace counseling services. There is a rising gap in ratio of counselors to students of only about one to every 1,600 students. Whereas the recommendation to counseling centers is one full-time equivalent counselor for every 1,000 students. At the same time the student need for counseling services is increasing. As a result, waitlists at college and university counseling centers are escalating. SPILL may serve as a one-time substitute when students who need immediate support and cannot acquire professional assistance. SPILL may also be a stepping stone for students afraid to seek professional help. Student Supporters often provide the college counseling center as a resource in their responses to Spills. Peer referrals to counseling centers may be most effective because peer providers have the capacity to be as effective, or more effective, than professionals at delivering some services.
