= .edu =

Internet top-level domain for educational institutions

edu
- Introduced: January 1, 1985; 41 years ago
- TLD type: Sponsored top-level domain
- Status: Active
- Registry: Educause (operated by VeriSign)
- Intended use: US Educational institutions
- Structure: Registrations at second level permitted
- Documents: RFC 920; RFC 1591
- DNSSEC: yes
- Registry website: net.educause.edu

edu is a sponsored top-level domain (sTLD) in the Domain Name System of the Internet. The domain was implemented in 1985 to create a domain name hierarchy for organizations with a focus on education. At the time, it was open for registration for entities from any region. Since October 29, 2001, new registrants for second-level domain names have been required to be United States-accredited institutions of higher education.

== History ==
The domain edu was implemented in April 1985 as a generic top-level domain. Six universities were the initial registrants that month. The University of California, Los Angeles, was among this group of the first schools to have their domains registered. And while the first ARPAnet message was sent from UCLA to Stanford, Stanford did not have their domain registered until half a year after these first schools, becoming the 18th .edu site.

Until 2001, Network Solutions served as registrar for edu under an arrangement with the United States Department of Commerce. Domain registration was done at no cost to educational institutions. In 2001, the Commerce Department entered into a five-year agreement with Educause making that organization the registrar for domain edu. The agreement with Educause was extended for an additional five-year period in 2006; at that time Educause was authorized to begin charging a yearly administrative fee to registrants.

The domain edu was originally intended for educational institutions anywhere in the world. However, most of the institutions that obtained edu registrations were in the United States, while non-U.S. educational institutions typically used country-level domains. In 1993, a decision attributed to Jon Postel limited new registrations in the edu domain to four-year postsecondary educational institutions. This prevented new edu registrations by community colleges and other institutions offering less than four years of postsecondary schooling.

Enforcement of the restrictions in the 1990s was not entirely effective. The webmaster for the Exploratorium, a San Francisco science museum, recalled in 2006 that the museum obtained its edu domain name at a time in the early 1990s "when there were about 600 websites and only one for a museum." The museum's Internet registrar allowed it to sidestep the then-extant domain-naming rules by using edu despite not being an academic institution and by using a name with more than 12 characters. Some community colleges were reported to have registered edu second-level names after 1993. In 1999 an article in Mother Earth News quoted an authority on distance education as saying, "Anyone who has the necessary $70 can register an edu domain name and use it to archive any type of enterprise on the Internet."

In 2001, the domain was restricted to U.S.-accredited postsecondary educational institutions. Subsequent changes expanded its use beyond four-year institutions, allowing registrations by accredited community colleges as well as by university systems, community college districts, and similar entities.

Between 2004 and 2019, the number of registered names in domain edu remained relatively persistent, with more than 7,000 but fewer than 8,000 names registered at any given time.

== Eligibility ==
Since October 29, 2001, only postsecondary institutions and organizations that are institutionally accredited by an agency on the United States Department of Education's list of nationally recognized accrediting agencies are eligible to apply for an edu domain. To be eligible, an institution must be located in the United States, legally organized in the United States, or recognized by a United States state, territorial, or federal agency. University system offices, community college district offices, and other entities within the United States that are organized to manage and govern multiple accredited postsecondary institutions may also register .edu domain names. Each eligible institution is limited to registering one .edu domain name, but institutions may also use names in other top-level domains.

== Grandfathered uses ==
Domains that were already registered in edu as of October 29, 2001, were grandfathered into the system. Holders of such domain names can retain their edu domain names without regard to the current eligibility criteria.

In 2003, Educause undertook an initiative to clear the edu registry of domain names that were not accurately registered by removing names whose registrants did not respond to requests that they log into the registry and review their whois entries. Through this effort, Educause expected to eliminate a number of domains that did not appear to qualify for registration in the edu domain, such as oracle.edu, geraldine.edu, and jedi.edu. Since 2006, Educause has been authorized to implement measures to prevent edu domain name owners from transferring their domain names to other entities. These measures, together with the imposition of registration fees, were intended to reduce the number of inactive or ineligible edu domain names.

The United States Department of Education notes that some "suspect" or "illegitimate" educational institutions continue to use edu addresses that were registered before the stringent eligibility criteria were adopted on October 29, 2001.

== Related domains ==
Many countries operate .edu or .ac namespaces within their country code top-level domains that serve the same purpose as the edu top-level domain. In the United States, community colleges and technical and vocational schools also have the option of registering fourth-level domains under the .cc.state.us and .tec.state.us affinity namespaces, while elementary and secondary schools and school districts may register under the .k12.state.us namespace.

In September 2015, the .college top-level domain emerged as an option for organizations that do not meet edu's more stringent criteria, such as non-accredited institutions and institutions based outside the United States.

== See also ==
- .ac (second-level domain)
- .edu (second-level domain)
