= IBR =

IBR may refer to:

== Science and technology ==
- Image-based modeling and rendering
- Internet background radiation
- Integrally bladed rotor, a turbomachinery component
- Infectious bovine rhinotracheitis, a herpes-type viral disease of cattle
- Iodine monobromide (IBr)
- Inverter-based resource (IBR), a generator connected to the electrical grid through a power converter

== Organisations ==
- Institute of Boiler and Radiator Manufacturers
- Institute of Biomedical Research, at the University of Birmingham, UK

== Other uses ==
- Income-based repayment, a method of student loan repayment in the US
- International Bibliography of Book Reviews of Scholarly Literature and Social Sciences
- Inverted Box Rib, a type of metal roof
- Ivey Business Review, an undergraduate business publication of Ivey Business School
- Ibaraki Airport (IATA airport code)
- Incorporation by reference, the act of including a second document within another document by only mentioning the second document

== See also ==
- IBRS (disambiguation)
