= Datacube Inc. =

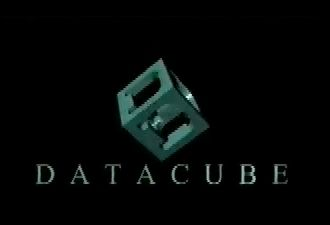
- Formerly: Datacube SMK, Inc.
- Type: Private
- Industry: Computer hardware Computer software
- Predecessor: Datacube Corporation
- Founded: 1978; 48 years ago
- Founders: Stanley Michael Karandanis; J. Stewart Dunn
- Defunct: 2005; 21 years ago
- Headquarters: Danvers, Massachusetts
- Website: datacube.com (archived)

Datacube Inc. was an American computer company active from 1978 to 2005. The company focused on products for image processing, developing real-time hardware and software products for the industrial, medical, military and scientific markets. Datacube's MaxVideo line of image processors enjoyed a high market share in the image processing field owing to its modularity. The company was also responsible for a number of industry firsts, including the first single-board frame grabber and the first real-time image convolver.

== Early history ==
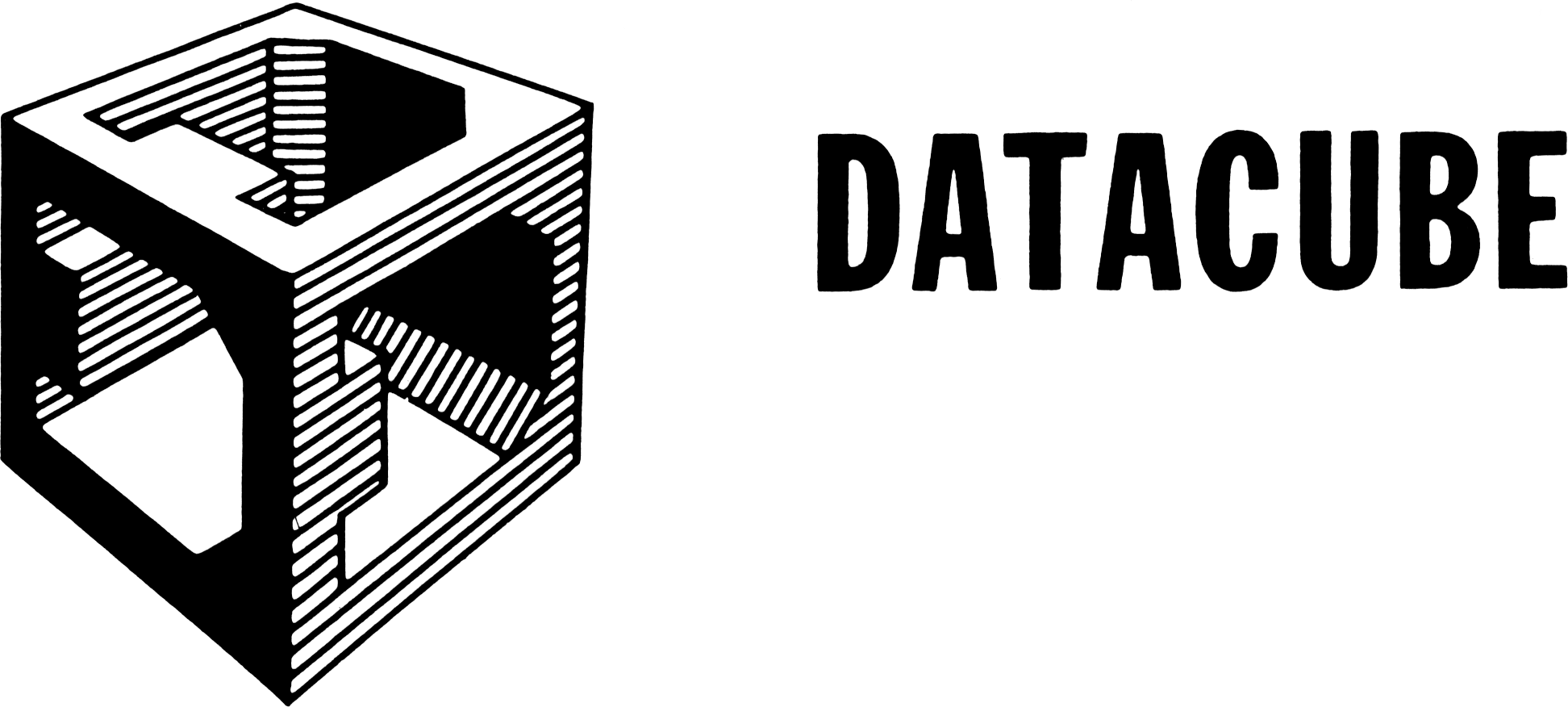
Old logo

Datacube brochure from 1981 showcasing various Multibus products

Datacube was founded as Datacube SMK, Inc., in 1978 by Stanley Michael Karandanis (1934–2007) and J. Stewart Dunn (1941–2020). Dunn and Karandanis headquartered Datacube SMK in Danvers, Massachusetts; it shares its name with an earlier company founded in 1969 by Karandanis, called Datacube Corporation. That company's only product was a precision, miniature (1.6-cubic inch) power supply for integrated circuits. The Datacube Corporation was founded in Billerica, Massachusetts, but later moved to Salem, New Hampshire. Initially, Datacube SMK manufactured board-level products for the Multibus, one of the first computer buses developed for microprocessors. Early boards designed by Dunn for Datacube SMK were PROM, RAM and character generator boards. Character display boards, such as the VT-103 and VR-107, were used in programmable read-only memory (PROM) programmers and similar systems.

Early in his career, Datacube's president and CEO Stanley Karandanis followed the leaders in the semiconductor field from Transitron to Bell Labs. Karandanis was the director of engineering at Monolithic Memories (MMI) when John Birkner and H.T. Chua designed the first successful programmable logic device, the programmable array logic (PAL) device. His contacts in the semiconductor field were instrumental in providing Datacube with components for its products. As well, programmable logic was important to Datacube's functional density: from the early days of bipolar PALs and PROMs to generic array logic (GAL), to every generation of FPGAs from Xilinx and then Actel and Quick Logic and Altera CPLDs. Said Rick Cooley, a hardware engineer at Datacube, "We use programmables like other designers use jellybeans".

In early 1980, Datacube introduced the VG-120, a frame grabber built on a single Multibus board. At the time, a frame grabber was a large box with multiple boards. The VG-120 was the first ever commercial single-board frame grabber; based on programmable array logic (PAL), it had a 320 × 240 × 6-bit resolution, grayscale video input and output.

Karandanis hired Rashid Beg and Robert Wang from Matrox to develop the first Q-Bus (DEC LSI-11) frame grabber. They developed the QVG/QAF-120 dual board, an 8-bit product primarily for a new startup named Cognex. While the latter were developing the hardware for Datacube, they were also planning to spin off and form a competitor, Imaging Technology, Inc. (ITI). To recover from this loss, and to complete the QVG-120 product, Dave Erickson was hired as a consultant in 1981 from Octek by the engineering manager Paul Bloom. Erickson came on full-time in 1982, as did Dave Simmons who was to head applications, and Bob Berger, who was to head software. At this time, ITI was developing a line of frame grabber products for Multibus and Q-Bus, with a real time image processor based on a single-point multiplier, adder and lookup table (LUT). In 1983, Karandanis hired Shep Siegel from Ampex, who had worked on the advanced and successful Ampex Digital Optics (ADO) real-time video spatial manipulator for the broadcast television market. At Datacube, Siegel developed a line of modular machine-vision products for the Motorola's VMEbus. The first in the line, the VVG-128 first video-acquisition, frame-grabber, and display system for the VMEbus, intended for factory automation. With Dunn's help, Simmons developed the VG-123 Multibus and Q-Bus frame grabber boards. During this development, Paul Bloom died, and Dave Erickson was promoted to engineering manager to replace Bloom.

== MaxVideo 10 ==
In late 1985, Datacube introduced the VMEbus-based MaxVideo 10 family of image processing boards for the machine vision market. The first seven MaxVideo boards were the Digimax (digitizer and display), Framestore (triple 512 × 512 framestore with unprecedented density), VFIR (the first real-time 3×3 image filter), SNAP (3×3 Systolic Neighborhood Array Processor), Featuremax (for real-time statistics), SP (a single-point general-purpose processor), and Protomax (a MaxVideo prototyping board). All boards interfaced through the proprietary MaxBus databus, while MaxWare was the software and drivers written to control the new boards. The MaxBus required accurate synchronization: clocking and timing of each board plus a flexible way to route data from function to function. A simple differential ECL bus with a driver on one end and terminator on the opposite end was used. For data, 14-pin ribbon cables allowed 8-bit 10 MHz data to be routed from any output to any input.

At the turn of the 1990s, Datacube experienced massive growth, tying with their rival spin-off ITI for the top spot for market share in the image processing market, at 17 percent. Around this time Barry Egan was brought on as vice president of manufacturing, and Barry Unger was promoted to chief operating officer from financial advisor. Robert C. Berger meanwhile expanded the software department and moved the main computers from CP/M machines to Unix machines, based on LSI-11s from Digital Equipment Corporation. A Unix-based Pyramid mainframe computer was purchased for hardware and software development. Accordingly, software development switched from assembly language to C. Later the company transitioned to workstations by Sun Microsystems. On April 23, 1987, he registered "datacube.com" as the 68th oldest internet domain name in existence (now owned by an unaffiliated private individual). In hardware, John Bloomfield was hired from Ampex. In 1990, the second tier of MaxVideo products was developed. Siegel began the company's first image warper, consisting of Addgen, Interp and XFS. Bloomfield expanded the fixed 512 × 512 processing to include regions-of-interest (ROI) processing. He began developing with the new FPGAs from Xilinx. Datacube's vertical integration of modular image processing boards established the company as a technology leader in real-time imaging.

== MaxVideo 20 and 200 ==
The next step was to condense up to a full rack of MaxVideo 10 hardware in a dual-slot VMEbus package, increase the pipeline to 20 MHz, maintain the modularity and flexibility and eliminate most of the MaxBus cables. After two years in development starting in 1988, the MaxVideo 20 was released in late 1990. This required a new 3-port image memory module based on the 72-pin SIMM form factor. Up to 6 SIMMs were used on each MaxVideo 20. The MaxVideo 20 also leveraged a new line of imaging chips from LSI Corporation, including a 32 × 32 digital crosspoint and an 8 × 8 20-MHz finite impulse response (FIR) filter. Dunn developed a new display controller, AG capable of up to 40 MHz display, and Erickson developed a new family of 20 MHz analog and flexible digital front ends, AS and AD. Dunn developed the color digitizer, AC. Another feature of the MaxVideo 20 was the new general processing ASIC, AU, developed by Dunn. This device contained many innovative linear, nonlinear and statistical imaging functions. Its architecture was to be the core of not only the MaxVideo 20 but the next generation imaging system as well. Built in the pre-RTL age of schematics, Dunn's AU ASIC incorporated booth multipliers designed by mathematician Steve Gabriel.

The memory SIMM was implemented with complex programmable logic devices (CPLDs), FPGAs and graphics DRAM. It was limited to 1 MB of memory and required 14 devices tightly packed onto the SIMM. Siegel developed VSIM, a fast and powerful ASIC to control high density SDRAMs.

A number of MaxModule processing modules were developed for MaxVideo 20. One of these was Siegel's MiniWarper, a 20 MHz real-time warper based on a new ASIC design. With the advent of MaxModules, it was now possible to implement an imaging function on a small and simple board with much less overhead than a full VME board.

In early 1993, Datacube introduced the MaxVideo 200, their third entry in the MaxVideo line. Powering the MaxVideo 200 is the D52, a 225,000-gate ASIC designed by Siegel that handles pipelines and image processing and permits the system to be expanded with conventional DRAM, on top of the 24 MB of graphics DRAM it possesses stock.

== MaxPCI ==
Until 1996, MaxVideo has been entirely VMEbus based. VMEbus and Unix had served markets well, but Pentium-based personal computers (PCs) with the Peripheral Component Interconnect (PCI) bus were coming on strong. Over the span of two years, Datacube developed a version of MaxVideo for PCs. Released in 1996, the MaxPCI had a processing speed of 40 MHz and featured a new, giant crosspoint ASIC: 50 x 40 x 8 with full ROI timing crosspoint and many imaging functions as well, developed by Erich Whitney. Dunn redesigned the AU ASIC to operate at 40 MHz and developed a new statistics unit. Tim Ganley developed the acquisition subsystem and Simmons developed a new family of 40 MHz analog and digital front-ends, QA and QD. For an integrated display, a VGA board from another imaging company, Univision was used. For a real-time disc solution, Shep developed NTD, a software solution for real-time disc access.

Meanwhile, Datacube recognized the need to better help its customers develop complex solutions in the medical, web inspection and machine vision markets. In 1994, three vertical integration development groups were formed. Siegel headed Medical, Simmons headed Web, and Scott Roth headed Machine Vision. Each of these groups developed systems for OEMs in their respective markets.

== MaxVision Toolkit ==
In 1995, the machine vision group produced the MaxVision Toolkit, a software library for image acquisition, object finding, metrology, inspection functions and camera calibration. More specifically, the Toolkit provided image acquisition (normalized correlation and connectivity), metrology tools (line fitting, arc fitting and edge locators), inspection tools (golden template, pixel counting and histogramming), image processing tools (Sobel edge filters, cross-gradient edge filters, threshold operations, morphology, image arithmetic, image copy, X and Y projections and convolutions) and high accuracy calibration that corrected for perspective distortion. Swami Manickam, Scott Roth and Tom Bushman of the machine vision group developed a significant tool called VsFind which performed intelligent normalized grayscale correlation that is invariant to rotation, scaling, and perspective distortion.

In 1997, Datacube designed and manufactured a single-board image processor with an embedded PowerPC 603e CPU for the VMEbus, called mvPower. Using mvPower, Datacube introduced MvTD, a compact machine-vision system, in the same year. Shortly afterward, Datacube created the mvPower-PCI with similar specifications as mvPower for VME. Both boards used Datacube ASICs for custom image processing and image acquisition.

== Decline and shutdown ==
Datacube was always a hardware-centric company; when CPUs were in the 100–1000 MIPS range, Datacube's 1000–10000 solutions were considered more useful. When CPUs and multi-core CPUs began to exceed 1000 MIPS, however, Datacube solutions were no longer needed, except for the very highest-end applications, whose profits were not adequate to sustain a business. In 2005, after years of steady decline, Datacube's remaining intellectual property, comprising the VMEbus- and PCI-based MaxVideo products, were sold to Shearwater Technology, Inc.

== Works cited ==
- Fountain, T. J. (1994). Parallel Computing: Principles and Practice. Cambridge University Press. p. 226. ISBN 9780521451314 – via Google Books.
