= List of HSMM nodes =

This is intended to be a comprehensive list of HSMM or "hinternet" nodes worldwide.

- The minimum criteria for a system being a node on this list is as follows:

1. Operate at a speed of greater than 56kbit/s
2. Accommodate IPv4, IPv6 or both
3. Accept connections and/or be used as a digipeater
4. Operational within an authorized Amateur radio or MARS band
5. Continuously powered on and accepting connections or digipeating, excluding power outages and maintenance downtime

== 802.11 ==
=== United States ===
==== Kansas ====
SSID	WEP Key	Channel	Frequency	City	Coordinates	Features
KD0NRC-HOMEGW		1	2.412 GHz	Lenexa, KS	38°58.47' N 94°43.72' W	NTP, Squid Proxy
KD0NRC-2		1	2.412 GHz	Lenexa, KS	38°58.47' N 94°43.72' W	Mesh Gateway
N0PGH-10		1	2.412 GHz	De Soto, KS		Mesh Node 1
N0PGH-12		1	2.412 GHz	De Soto, KS		Mesh Node 2

==== Texas ====
SSID	WEP Key	Channel	Frequency	City	Coordinates	Features
k8ocl-2	HSMM-	1	2.412 GHz	Richardson, TX		802.11g

== D-Star ==
=== United States ===
==== Alabama ====
Callsign	IPv4 Address	IPv6 Address	Frequency	Offset	City	Coordinates	Features
WB4GNA			1251.00 MHz		Anniston		
KD4SO			1250.00 MHz		Birmingham		
KI4PPF			1251.800 MHz		Huntsville		
KI4SAZ			1251.00 MHz		Magnolia Springs		
KI4SAY			1251.00 MHz		Mentone		

==== Florida ====
Callsign	IPv4 Address	IPv6 Address	Frequency	Offset	City	Coordinates	Features
K1XC A			1255.00 MHz	+ 5Mhz	Orlando		

== See also ==
- 802.11
- AX.25
- D-Star
- HSMM
- Packet radio
