= IBRS =

IBRS may refer to:

- International Business Reply Service, a postal service
- Indirect Branch Restricted Speculation, an extended feature flag for the x86 architecture
- Princess Anastasia (1986) (callsign IBRS), a cruiseferry

== See also ==
- IBR (disambiguation)
