= High-speed multimedia radio =

High-speed multimedia radio (HSMM) is the implementation of high-speed wireless TCP/IP data networks over amateur radio frequency allocations using commercial off-the-shelf (COTS) hardware such as 802.11 Wi-Fi access points. This is possible because the 802.11 unlicensed frequency bands partially overlap with amateur radio bands and ISM bands in many countries. Only licensed amateur radio operators may legally use amplifiers and high-gain antennas within amateur radio frequencies to increase the power and coverage of an 802.11 signal.

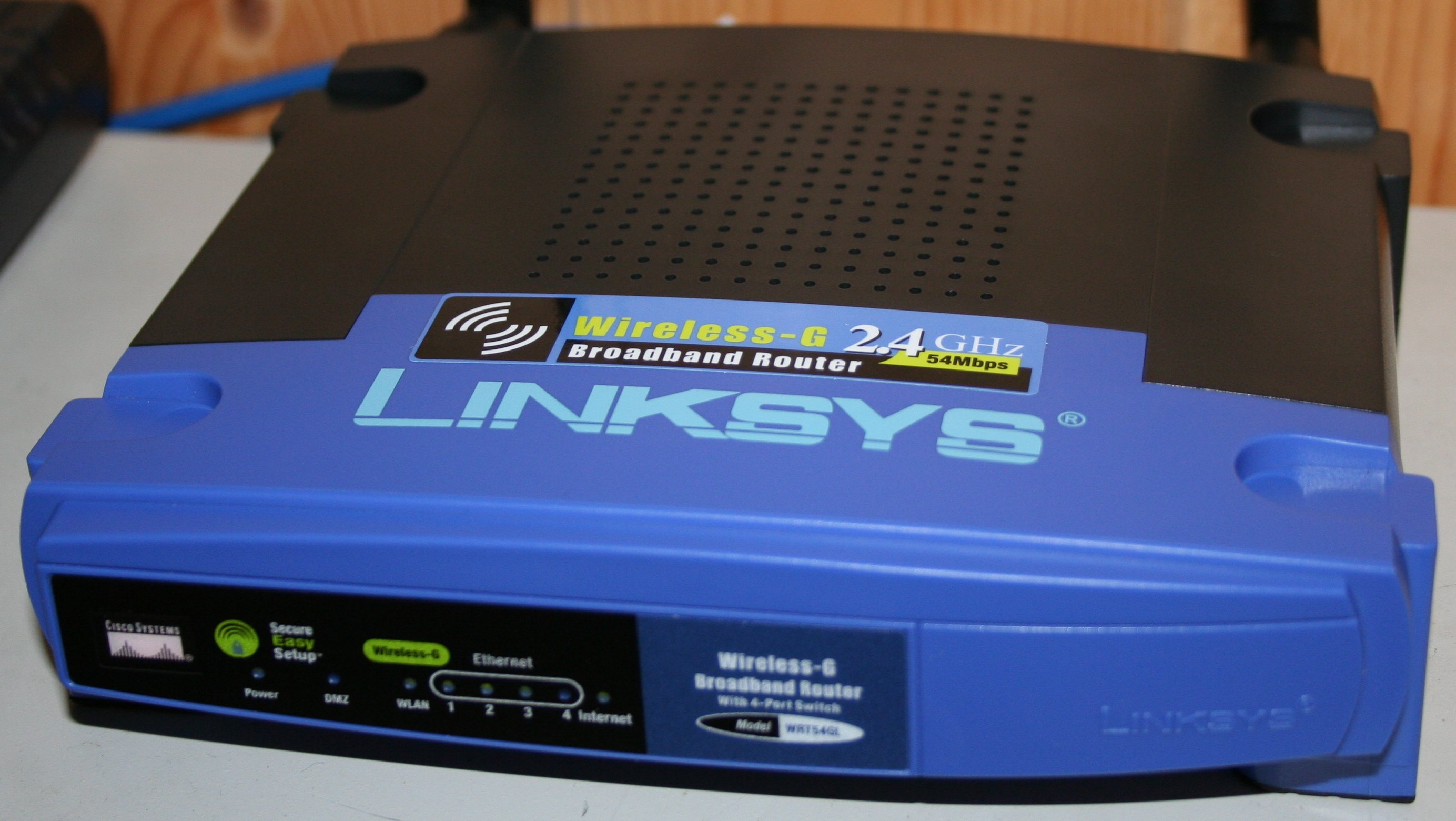
A typical piece of equipment used for HSMM (Linksys WRT54G)

== Basics ==
The idea behind this implementation is to modify commercial 802.11 equipment for use on licensed amateur radio frequencies. The main frequency bands being used for these networks are: 900 MHz (33 cm), 2.4 GHz (13 cm), 3.4 GHz (9 cm), and 5.8 GHz (5 cm). Since the unlicensed 802.11 or Wi-Fi frequency bands overlap with amateur frequencies, only custom firmware is needed to access these licensed frequencies. Such networks can be used for emergency communications for disaster relief operations as well as in everyday amateur radio communications (hobby/social).

== Capabilities ==
HSMM can support most of the traffic that the Internet currently does, including video chat, voice, instant messaging, email, the Web (HTTP), file transfer (FTP), and forums. The only differences being that with HSMM, such services are community instead of commercially implemented and it is mostly wireless. HSMM can even be connected to the Internet and used for web surfing, although because of the FCC regulations on permitted content, this is done only when directly used for ham radio activities (under Part 97). Using high gain directional antennas and amplifiers, reliable long-distance wireless links over many miles are possible and only limited by propagation and the radio horizon.

== Bandwidths and speeds ==
HSMM networks most-often use professional hardware with narrower channel bandwidths such as 5 or 10 MHz to help increase range. It is common for networks to use channel -2 with a 5 MHz bandwidth. For long-range links extending outside of metropolitan areas 802.11b DSSS modulations, 802.11g BPSK/QPSK, or 802.11ah (900 MHz) equipment can be used, further increasing range at the cost of speed.

802.11b Speeds Table 5 MHz bandwidth 2.4 GHz band
Mode	Modulation	Max Speed
1	DSSS BPSK	0.25 Mbps
2	DSSS QPSK	0.5 Mbps
5.5	DSSS QPSK	1.375 Mbps
11	DSSS QPSK	2.75 Mbps

- DSSS is 10 watts max PEP in USA

802.11b Speeds Table 10 MHz bandwidth 2.4 GHz band
Mode	Modulation	Max Speed
1	DSSS BPSK	0.5 Mbps
2	DSSS QPSK	1 Mbps
5.5	DSSS QPSK	2.75 Mbps
11	DSSS QPSK	5.5 Mbps

- DSSS is 10 watts max PEP in USA

802.11g Speeds Table 5 MHz bandwidth 2.4 GHz band
Mode	Modulation	Max Speed
6	OFDM BPSK	1.5 Mbps
9	OFDM BPSK	2.25 Mbps
12	OFDM QPSK	3 Mbps
18	OFDM QPSK	4.5 Mbps
24	OFDM 16QAM	6 Mbps
36	OFDM 16QAM	9 Mbps
48	OFDM 64QAM	12 Mbps
54	OFDM 64QAM	13.5 Mbps

802.11g Speeds Table 10 MHz bandwidth 2.4 GHz band
Mode	Modulation	Max Speed
6	OFDM BPSK	3 Mbps
9	OFDM BPSK	4.5 Mbps
12	OFDM QPSK	6 Mbps
18	OFDM QPSK	9 Mbps
24	OFDM 16QAM	12 Mbps
36	OFDM 16QAM	18 Mbps
48	OFDM 64QAM	24 Mbps
54	OFDM 64QAM	27 Mbps

802.11ah Speeds Table 1 MHz bandwidth 900 MHz band
Mode	Modulation	Max Speed
0	OFDM BPSK	0.36 Mbps
1	OFDM QPSK	0.72 Mbps
2	OFDM QPSK	1.085 Mbps
3	OFDM 16-QAM	1.445 Mbps
4	OFDM 16-QAM	2.165 Mbps
5	OFDM 16-QAM	2.89 Mbps
6	OFDM 16-QAM	3.25 Mbps
7	OFDM 16-QAM	3.61 Mbps
8	OFDM 256-QAM	4.335 Mbps

802.11ah Speeds Table 2 MHz bandwidth 900 MHz band
Mode	Modulation	Max Speed
0	OFDM BPSK	0.72 Mbps
1	OFDM QPSK	1.44 Mbps
2	OFDM QPSK	2.17 Mbps
3	OFDM 16-QAM	2.89 Mbps
4	OFDM 16-QAM	4.33 Mbps
5	OFDM 16-QAM	5.78 Mbps
6	OFDM 16-QAM	6.5 Mbps
7	OFDM 16-QAM	7.22 Mbps
8	OFDM 256-QAM	8.67 Mbps

802.11ah Speeds Table 4 MHz bandwidth 900 MHz band
Mode	Modulation	Max Speed
0	OFDM BPSK	1.44 Mbps
1	OFDM QPSK	2.88 Mbps
2	OFDM QPSK	4.34 Mbps
3	OFDM 16-QAM	5.78 Mbps
4	OFDM 16-QAM	8.66 Mbps
5	OFDM 16-QAM	11.56 Mbps
6	OFDM 16-QAM	13 Mbps
7	OFDM 16-QAM	14.44 Mbps
8	OFDM 256-QAM	17.34 Mbps

== US / FCC frequencies and channels ==
The following is a list of the 802.11 channels that overlap into an amateur radio band under the FCC in the United States. Note that the 5 cm amateur band extends from 5.65 to 5.925 GHz, so that there are many frequencies outside the Part 15 ISM/UNII block used for 802.11a. Many commercial grade 802.11a access points can also operate in between the normal channels by using 5 MHz channel spacing instead of the standard 20 MHz channel spacing. 802.11a channels 132, 136 and 140 are only available for unlicensed use in ETSI regions. Channels and frequencies marked in red should not be used.

2.4 GHz (13 cm)
Channel	Center Frequency	FCC Rules
−2*	2.397 GHz*	Part 97*
−1	2.402 GHz	Part 97
0	2.407 GHz	(Guard band)
1	2.412 GHz	Part 97 & Part 15
2	2.417 GHz	Part 97 & Part 15
3	2.422 GHz	Part 97 & Part 15
4	2.427 GHz	Part 97 & Part 15
5	2.432 GHz	Part 97 & Part 15
6	2.437 GHz	Part 97 & Part 15

* must use 5/10Mhz bandwidth

3.5 GHz (9 cm)
Channel	Center Frequency	FCC Rules
76	3.380 GHz	Part 97
77	3.385 GHz	Part 97
78	3.390 GHz	Part 97
79	3.395 GHz	Part 97
80	3.400 GHz	Part 97
81	3.405 GHz	Part 97
82	3.410 GHz	Part 97
83	3.415 GHz	Part 97
84	3.420 GHz	Part 97
85	3.425 GHz	Part 97
86	3.430 GHz	Part 97
87	3.435 GHz	Part 97
88	3.440 GHz	Part 97
89	3.445 GHz	Part 97
90	3.450 GHz	Part 97
91	3.455 GHz	Part 97
92	3.460 GHz	Part 97
93	3.465 GHz	Part 97
94	3.470 GHz	Part 97
95	3.475 GHz	Part 97
96	3.480 GHz	Part 97
97	3.485 GHz	Part 97
98	3.490 GHz	Part 97
99	3.495 GHz	Part 97

5 GHz (5 cm)
Channel	Center Frequency	FCC Rules
132	5.660 GHz	TDWR
134	5.670 GHz	TDWR
136	5.680 GHz	Part 97 & Part 15
138	5.690 GHz	Part 97 & Part 15
140	5.700 GHz	Part 97 & Part 15
142	5.710 GHz	Part 97 & Part 15
144	5.720 GHz	Part 97 & Part 15
149	5.745 GHz	Part 97 & Part 15
151	5.755 GHz	Part 97 & Part 15
153	5.765 GHz	Part 97 & Part 15
155	5.775 GHz	Part 97 & Part 15
157	5.785 GHz	Part 97 & Part 15
159	5.795 GHz	Part 97 & Part 15
161	5.805 GHz	Part 97 & Part 15
165	5.825 GHz	Part 97 & Part 15
169	5.845 GHz	Part 97
170	5.850 GHz	Part 97
171	5.855 GHz	Part 97
172	5.860 GHz	Part 97
173	5.865 GHz	Part 97
174	5.870 GHz	Part 97
175	5.875 GHz	Part 97
176	5.880 GHz	Part 97
177	5.885 GHz	Part 97
178	5.890 GHz	Part 97
179	5.895 GHz	Part 97
180	5.900 GHz	Part 97
181	5.905 GHz	Part 97
182	5.910 GHz	Part 97
183	5.915 GHz	Part 97
184	5.920 GHz	Part 97

The following images show the overlapping relationship of the Part 15 unlicensed bands and the Part 97 licensed bands. The images are not to scale.

3.4 GHz 802.11b/g

5.8 GHz 802.11a

Acronyms Used: (amateur radio) (ISM) (Radar)

== Channels and power ==
=== FCC / United States ===
==== 5 GHz ====
All 802.11 standards in the 5 GHz band are OFDM. This band consists of 30 overlapping channels in the 5.650–5.925 GHz.(5 cm) band.

The 802.11a/h/n/ac/ax/be standards use Orthogonal Frequency Division Multiplexing (OFDM) to transmit data and therefore is not classified as spread-spectrum. Because of this 802.11a/h/n/ac/ax/be hardware is not subject to the power rules in FCC Part 97 § 97.311 and the maximum allowable output power is 1,500 watts (W) PEP.

This band also exists in ITU Regions 1 and 3, but it is narrower at 5.650–5.850 GHz.

==== 2.4 GHz ====
The amateur ratio band in 2.4 GHz consists of 8 overlapping channels in the 2.390–2.450 GHz (13 cm) band.

The 802.11b specification uses Direct Sequence Spread Spectrum (DSSS) to transmit data and is subject to the rules of FCC Part 97 § 97.311. Therefore, the maximum allowable power output for 802.11b transmission in the USA is 10 W PEP.

The 802.11g/n/ax/be standard use Orthogonal Frequency Division Multiplexing (OFDM) to transmit data and therefore is not classified as spread-spectrum. Because of this 802.11g/n/ax/be hardware is not subject to the power rules in FCC Part 97 § 97.311 and the maximum allowable output power is 1,500 W PEP.

==== 3.4 GHz ====
The 3.300–3.500 GH amateur ratio band is allocated on a secondary basis. It consists of 24 overlapping channels.

The 802.11y standard uses Orthogonal Frequency Division Multiplexing (OFDM) to transmit data and therefore is not classified as spread-spectrum. Because of this 802.11y hardware is not subject to the power rules in FCC Part 97 § 97.311 and the maximum allowable output power is 1,500 W PEP.

It exists in ITU Region 2 and 3, but not in ITU Region 1.

The standardized frequency for 802.11y is 3.655–3695 GHz with 8 non-overlapping channels (and 6 overlapping ones built on top of them). This used to be a licensed range, but is now part of the 3.55–3.7 GHz Citizens Broadband Radio Service (CRBS) band, managed by an automated Spectrum Access System.

== Frequency sharing ==
=== FCC / United States ===
==== 5 GHz ====
The 5 cm band is shared with the fixed-satellite service in ITU Region 1, and the radiolocation service. In ITU Region 2 (US) the primary user is military radiolocation, specifically naval radar. Amateur radio operators have secondary privileges to the Federal radiolocation service in the entire band and may not cause interference to these users. Amateur operators are allocated this band are in a co-secondary basis with ISM devices and space research. Amateur, space research, and ISM operators each have the "right to operate". Due to the lack of a high number of Part 15 users (compared to 2.4 GHz), the noise level tends to be lower in many parts of the US but can be quite congested in urban centers and on mountaintops. The frequencies from 5.6-5.65 GHz (channel 132) should generally be avoided to prevent interfering with TDWR weather radar stations.

==== 2.4 GHz ====
The 13 cm band is shared with Part 15 users as well as the Federal radiolocation service, and ISM (industrial, scientific, medical) devices. Amateur radio operators have secondary privileges to the Federal radiolocation service in the entire band and may not cause interference to these users. Amateur radio operators have primary privileges to ISM devices from 2.390–2.417 GHz and secondary privileges from 2.417–2.450 GHz. Because of the high number of Part 15 users, the noise level in this band tends to be rather high.

==== 3.4 GHz ====
The 9 cm band is shared with fixed services and space-to-Earth communications. Amateur radio operators using this band may not cause interference to other licensed users, including government radar stations. The low number of users tends to make this band quiet.

== Identification ==
As with any amateur radio mode, stations must identify at least once every 10 minutes. One acceptable method for doing so is to transmit one's call sign inside an ICMP echo request (commonly known as a ping). If the access point is set to "master" (base station) then the user's call sign may be set as the "SSID" and therefore will be transmitted at regular intervals (usually 100 milliseconds, the default beacon interval).

It is also possible to automatically send an amateur call sign in plain text (ASCII) every 10 minutes using DHCP. This requires that a computer's hostname be set to the call sign of the amateur operator and that the DHCP server's lease time be set to less than or equal to 10 minutes. With this method implemented the computer will send a DNS "push" request that includes the local computers hostname every time the DHCP lease is renewed. This method is supported by all modern operating systems including but not limited to Windows, Mac OS X, BSD, and Linux.

802.11 hardware may transmit and receive the entire time it is powered on even if the user is not sending data. Periodic transmissions called "keep-alives" are made to keep the base station aware of the client's continued presence. A BSS Max Idle Period setting reported by the base station determines how often the client must transmit to stay associated. Power-saving features such as 802.11v can help reduce the need of keep-alives.

== Security ==
Because the meaning of amateur transmissions may not be obscured, security measures that are implemented must be published. This does not necessarily restrict authentication or login schemes, but it does restrict fully encrypted communications. This leaves the communications vulnerable to various attacks once the authentication has been completed. This makes it very difficult to keep unauthorized users from accessing HSMM networks, although casual eavesdroppers can effectively be deterred. Current schemes include using MAC address filtering, WEP and WPA/WPA2/WPA3-PSK. MAC address filtering and WEP are all hackable by using freely available software from the Internet, making them the less secure options. The newer WPA/WPA2/WPA3 are relatively more secure, though the "personal" per-shared key (PSK) mode allows anyone with the password to eavesdrop on the session key establishment, in contrast to the enterprise 802.1X mode.

There is a concern that the FCC Rule 97.113(a)(4) prohibition against "messages encoded for the purpose of obscuring their meaning" would apply to encrypted HSMM. According to a 2013 ARRL comment to the FCC, the FCC has historically allowed encryption for the purpose of authentication and identification, but it does remain difficult to discern the relative degree of intention. Some have advocated for publishing the encryption keys themselves in a publicly accessible place (like authors of new radio protocols would make their software open-source), but KD0LIX advises against such a practice, especially since it would not be correct given that WPA and later protocols exchange per-session keys. Accessing parts of the Internet through common encrypted protocols such as HTTPS is not possible either way.

(There is no broadly-supported combination of 802.11 protocols that implements cryptographic authentication without encryption. KD0LIX has suggested that since authenticated-but-not-encrypted VPN programs exist, one can run it on top of a 802.11 network.)

A commonly stated reason for encryption is to prevent connection by non-HAM users using regular unlicensed (Part 15) 802.11 devices. Using professional or modified hardware it is possible to operate on 802.11a channels that are outside the FCC authorized Part 15 bands but still inside the 5.8 GHz (5 cm) or 2.4 GHz (13 cm) amateur radio bands. Transverters or "frequency converters" can also be used to move HSMM 802.11b/g/n operations from the 2.4 GHz (13 cm) band to the 3.4 GHz (9 cm) amateur radio band.

== Custom frequencies ==
Using amateur-only frequencies provides better security and interference characteristics to amateur radio operators. In the past it used to be easy to use modified consumer grade hardware to operate 802.11 on channels that are outside of the normal FCC allocated frequencies for unlicensed users but still inside an amateur radio band. However, regulatory concerns with the non-authorized use of licensed band frequencies is making it harder. Historically it has been easier to perform non-authorized use on Linux, but the check has been tightened:

- Since Linux 2.6.28 (2008) the drivers use a Central Regulatory Domain Agent to prevent a casual user from operating outside of the country-specific operating bands. There is also a digital signature check on the database file. The stated goal is to prevent accidental non-compliance using a single copy of the database; a skilled user can still install a relaxed regulatory database, but only when using a custom version of CRDA with digital signature checking disabled.
- Since Linux 4.5 (2016) the kernel itself handles a centralized database file called regulatory.db as a more up-to-date alternative to the CRDA. Again there is a signature check; to disable it a custom build of the kernel is required.

More drastic frequency changes require the use of radio transceivers based on the use of Transverter (or frequency converter) technology. Such a device converts the operating frequency of the 802.11b/g device from 2.4 GHz to another band entirely. Transverter is a technical term and is rarely used to describe these products which are more commonly known as frequency converters, up/down converters, and just converters.

=== 420 MHz ===
The Atheros chipset's ability to use 5 MHz transmission bandwidths could allow part 97 operation on the 420–430 MHz ATV sub-band. (Note that 420–430 MHz operation is not allowed near the Canada–US border. Refer to the "Line A" rule.) Products that use the Atheros chipset for this band include:

- Doodle Labs DL-435, a mini-PCI adapter. Doodle Labs is a privately held manufacturing company with headquarters in Singapore that designs and manufactures a line of long range Wireless Data Transceiver devices.
- XAGYL Communications XC420M, a mini-PCI adapter. XAGYL Communications is a Canadian Distributor of Ultra High-Speed, Long Range Wireless equipment.

=== 900 MHz ===
Transverters as well as using 802.11 hardware such as the original NRC WaveLan or FHSS modems made by Aerocomm and FreeWave make it possible to operate on this band. Ubiquiti M9-series also provide hardware capable in this band. Beware that noise floor on this band in the larger cities is usually very high, which severely limits receiver performance.

=== 2.4 GHz custom frequencies ===
Using professional grade hardware or modified consumer grade hardware it is possible to operate on 802.11b/g hardware on channels that are effectively: "−1" at 2.402 GHz, and "−2" at 2.397 GHz. Using these channels allows amateur operators to move away from unlicensed Part 15 operators but may interfere with amateur radio satellite downlinks near 2.400 GHz and 2.401 GHz.

=== 3.3–3.8 GHz ===
Commercially available converters can convert a 2.4 GHz 802.11b/g signal to the 3.4 GHz (9 cm) band which is not authorized for unlicensed Part 15 users.

Ubiquiti Networks has four radios based on Atheros chipsets with transverters on board for this band. The PowerBridge M3 and M365 for 3.5 GHz and 3.65 GHz respectively for aesthetically low profile PtP (Point-to-Point) connections. The Nanostation M3 and M365 are in a molded weatherproof case with 13.7 dBi dual polarization antennas. The Rocket M3, M365 and M365 GPS are in a rugged case using a hi-power, very linear 2x2 MIMO radio with 2x RP-SMA (Waterproof) connectors. Finally the NanoBridge M3 and M365 for long range PtP connections. These devices use N mode Atheros chipsets along with Ubiquiti's airMax TDMA protocol to overcome the hidden node problem which is commonly an issue when using ptmp wireless outdoors. UBNT currently does not allow sales to U.S. Amateurs and only sell these radios under FCC License. This may be due to exclusion areas near coasts and US Navy installations. The 3.5 GHz band is currently used for DoD or Navy (shipborne and ground-based) radar operations and covers 60 percent of the U.S. population. This however may change due to a recent FCC NPRM & Order.

=== 5.8 GHz custom frequencies ===
Using professional grade hardware or modified consumer grade hardware it is possible to operate on 802.11a channels 116–140 (5.57–5.71 GHz) and channels above 165 (> 5.835 GHz). These frequencies are outside of the FCC-allocated Part 15 unlicensed band, but still inside of the 5.8 GHz (5 cm) amateur radio band. Modifying consumer hardware to operate on these expanded channels often involves installing after-market firmware and/or changing the "country code" setting of the wireless card. When buying professional grade hardware, many companies will authorize the use of these expanded frequencies for a small additional fee.

== Custom firmware ==
One popular way to access amateur-only frequencies is to modify an off-the-shelf access point with custom firmware (firmware for the AP, not the wireless card itself; it is equivalent to the "software" on a Linux-based computer). This custom firmware is freely available on the Internet from projects such as DD-WRT and OpenWrt. The AREDN Project supports off-the-shelf firmware that supports Part-97-only frequencies on Ubiquiti and TP-Link hardware. A popular piece of hardware that is modified is the Linksys WRT54GL because of the widespread availability of both the hardware and third-party firmware, however, the Linksys hardware is not frequency agile due to the closed nature of the Linksys drivers.

== See also ==
- Map of AREDN network HSMM nodes
- Amateur radio emergency communications
- Amateur radio frequency allocations
- AMPRNet
- DD-WRT
- Metropolitan Area Network
- Orthogonal frequency-division multiplexing
- Packet Radio
- Spread spectrum
- Tomato Firmware
- Ultra wideband
- Wireless Distribution System
- Wireless LAN
- List of HSMM nodes
