= Mcast.net =

Domain reserved by the Internet Assigned Numbers Authority

mcast.net is a second level domain reserved by the Internet Assigned Numbers Authority (IANA) and maintained by Verisign used to bind DNS records unique to multicast addressing. The domain and its subdomains are not associated with any web site.

In 2011 it was proposed to make it flow into the domain .arpa without having found success.

== Examples ==
Examples of multicast address definitions in the domain mcast.net are:

Domain name	Address	Description
base-address.mcast.net	224.0.0.0	base address
all-systems.mcast.net	224.0.0.1	all systems on the local networks
all-routers.mcast.net	224.0.0.2	all routers in the local networks
dvmrp.mcast.net	224.0.0.4	all routers for the Distance Vector Multicast Routing Protocol (DVMRP)
igmp.mcast.net	224.0.0.22	IGMP protocol
mdns.mcast.net	224.0.0.251	Multicast DNS protocol
ntp.mcast.net	224.0.1.1	Network Time Protocol (NTP)
sip.mcast.net	224.0.1.75	Session Initiation Protocol (SIP) servers

== See also ==
- Multicast
- .net
