= .edu (second-level domain) =

Domain used for academia

The sequence edu (short for educational) is in use in many countries as a second-level domain for academic institutions such as universities, colleges, and research institutes.

Many countries use .ac for the same purpose. Still others do not maintain a second-level domain specifically for academic institutions. In France, Germany, Switzerland, and the Netherlands, for example, each institution will have its own second-level domain (thus sorbonne.fr for the Sorbonne, hslu.ch for the Lucerne University of Applied Sciences and Arts and tum.de for the Technical University of Munich). In Italy, this applies only for university and higher education institutions, such as Sapienza University of Rome whose website is uniroma1.it, or unibo.it for the University of Bologna and so on. In the past, schools had to use the .gov.it domain. That changed with Agid's Order no.36 of February 12, 2018.

In some countries, both edu and ac second-level domains exist, differentiating between different types of academic institutions. China, for example, announced in 2006 that it would use edu.cn for educational institutions and ac.cn for research institutions.

== Countries with second-level domain edu for educational institutions ==
- Antigua and Barbuda: edu.ag
- Argentina: edu.ar
- Australia: edu.au
- Azerbaijan: edu.az
- Bangladesh: edu.bd
- Brazil: edu.br
- Brunei: edu.bn
- China: edu.cn
- Colombia: edu.co
- Djibouti: edu.dj
- Ecuador: edu.ec
- Egypt: edu.eg
- El Salvador: edu.sv
- Eritrea: edu.er
- Estonia: edu.ee
- Ethiopia: edu.et
- Finland: edu.fi
- Ghana: edu.gh
- Greece: edu.gr
- Guatemala: edu.gt
- Hong Kong: edu.hk
- Italy: edu.it
- India: edu.in
- Jamaica: edu.jm
- Jordan: edu.jo
- Kazakhstan: edu.kz
- Lebanon: edu.lb
- Libya: edu.ly
- Macao: edu.mo
- Malaysia: edu.my
- Malta: edu.mt
- Mexico: edu.mx
- Myanmar: edu.mm
- Nepal: edu.np
- Nicaragua: edu.ni
- Nigeria: edu.ng
- North Korea: edu.kp
- Oman: edu.om
- Pakistan: edu.pk
- Peru: edu.pe
- Philippines: edu.ph
- Poland: edu.pl
- Qatar: edu.qa
- Saudi Arabia: edu.sa
- Scotland: edu.scot
- Serbia: edu.rs
- Singapore: edu.sg
- Somalia: edu.so
- South Africa: edu.za
- Spain: edu.es
- Sri Lanka: edu.lk
- Sudan: edu.sd
- Taiwan: edu.tw
- Tyrol: edu.tirol
- Turkey: edu.tr
- Ukraine: edu.ua
- Uruguay: edu.uy
- Vietnam: edu.vn

== See also ==
- edu (top-level domain)
- .ac_(second-level_domain)
