= .tr =

Internet country code top-level domain for Turkey

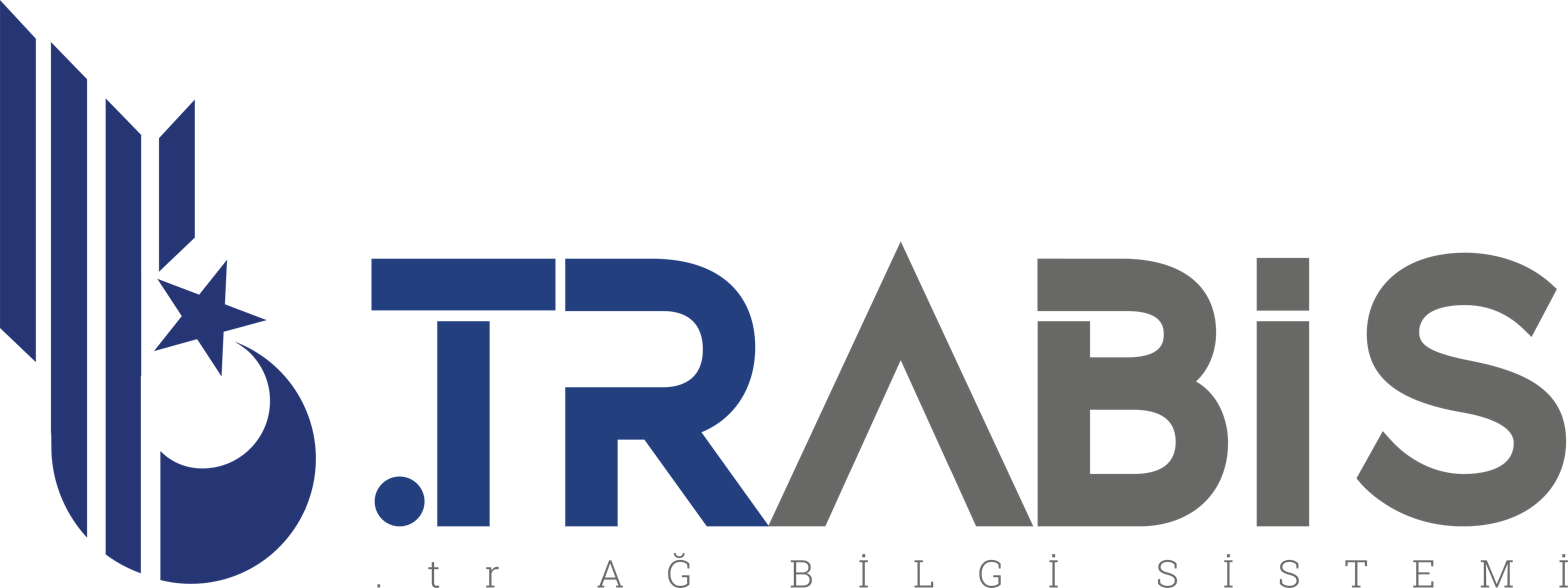
- Introduced: 17 September 1990
- TLD type: Country code top-level domain
- Status: Active
- Registry: TRABİS (run by Information and Communication Technologies Authority of Turkey)
- Sponsor: .tr Domain Registry (managed by Information and Communication Technologies Authority of Turkey's Computer Center DNS Group)
- Intended use: Entities connected with Turkey
- Actual use: Very popular in Turkey, especially com.tr subdomain (as of 19 February 2008, there were 103,175 com.tr registrations); gets some other uses related to Turkey
- Registered domains: 1.303.091 (13 March 2025)
- Registration restrictions: Varying restrictions on generic 3rd-level subdomain names; registrant must be located in Turkey or have a representative there
- Structure: Registrations are made directly at the second or third level beneath generic-category 2nd level domains
- Documents: Regulations; FAQ
- Dispute policies: Dispute Resolution
- DNSSEC: no
- Registry website: www.trabis.gov.tr

Former logo when administered under NIC.tr

.tr is the Internet country code top-level domain (ccTLD) for Turkey. It is administered by trABİS (under the Information and Communication Technologies Authority of Turkey) and managed by the Computer Center DNS Group of the ICT Authority. The domain was formerly administered by NIC.tr and managed by the Turkey Internet Society (the local chapter of ISOC) until September 2022.

== Statistics ==
As of March 2017, around 15.53% of all the .tr domains were served via secured HTTPS protocol, with the Let's Encrypt Authority X3 being the most popular SSL certificate. Microsoft-IIS is the most popular web server, serving 35.31% of the .tr domains, followed by Apache serving 35.14% of the total .tr domains.

== History ==
.nic.tr, formerly the official registry's domain, was closed on 12 September 2022. Since then domain management is only possible via accredited registrars. The registry TRABIS is the registrar for restricted SLDs like gov.tr. Additionally com.tr, org.tr and net.tr can be registered without additional documents since this date.

== Domains ==
=== Second-level ===
In 2023 the registry started a 3-phase launch process with different priorities of current SLD registrants to apply for the second level variant. On 7 August 2024 the third phase ended, since then domains are allocated first-come first-served.

==== .ct.tr and .nc.tr ====
.ct.tr and .nc.tr are the second level domain names of Northern Cyprus. Because Northern Cyprus is an unrecognised state, it does not have a top-level domain and uses .tr, the top-level domain name of Turkey. Infrastructure has been created for the future spread of the domain names, which only hosts the websites of some Turkish Cypriot state institutions. ct.tr hosts 44+ websites, while nc.tr is never used except for two websites, one of which is a duplicate version of the Republican Assembly's ct.tr version. That has two versions: One that has https, which is expired, and one without it, which is faster than the ct.tr version. The other website is the searching feature of the Republican Assembly.

=== Third-level ===
Several third-level domains are present under .tr:

- gov.tr (reserved for the Government of Turkey and state institutions/organizations)
- mil.tr (reserved for the Turkish Armed Forces; retired in 2010 and replaced by tsk.tr)
- tsk.tr (reserved for the Turkish Armed Forces; used since 2010)
- k12.tr (reserved for schools approved by the Ministry of National Education)
- edu.tr (reserved for higher education institutions approved by the Council of Higher Education)
- av.tr (reserved for freelance lawyers, law firms and attorney partnerships)
- dr.tr (reserved for medical doctors, medical partnerships, hospitals, and healthcare services)
- bel.tr (reserved for provincial, district, and town municipal organizations and governments)
- pol.tr (reserved for the General Directorate of Security and police)
- kep.tr (reserved for Registered Electronic Mail Service Providers [KEPHS] authorized by the Information and Communication Technologies Authority)
- com.tr (intended for commercial entities)
- net.tr (reserved for network operators/providers, as well as internet-related access services such as portals, e-mail, etc.)
- org.tr (reserved for nonprofit entities such as foundations, associations, and non-governmental organizations)
- info.tr (intended for informational websites)
- bbs.tr (reserved for entities providing BBS services)
- nom.tr (reserved for individual/personal use)
- tv.tr (reserved for entities in the television industry)
- biz.tr (intended for commercial entities)
- tel.tr (reserved for use in connection with Turkish telephone numbers)
- gen.tr (general use)
- web.tr (general use)
- name.tr (reserved for individual/personal use)

== See also ==
- Country code top-level domain
- Telecommunications in Turkey
- Internet in Turkey
