= .ac (second-level domain) =

Domain used for academia

The sequence ac (short for academia) is in use in many countries as a second-level domain for academic institutions such as universities, colleges, and research institutes. In the United Kingdom and Japan, for example, academic institutions use domain names ending in ac.uk and ac.jp respectively.

Many countries use edu for the same purpose, such as Australia (edu.au) and Malaysia (edu.my). Still others do not maintain a second-level domain specifically for academic institutions. In France, Germany, Switzerland, and the Netherlands, for example, each institution will have its own second-level domain (thus sorbonne.fr for the Sorbonne, hslu.ch for the Lucerne University of Applied Sciences and Arts and tum.de for the Technical University of Munich).

In some countries, both .edu and .ac second-level domains exist, differentiating between different types of academic institutions. China, for example, announced in 2006 that it would use edu.cn for educational institutions and ac.cn for research institutions.

== Countries with .ac as second-level domain for educational institutions ==
- Austria: ac.at
- Bangladesh: ac.bd
- Belgium: ac.be
- Botswana: ac.bw
- China: ac.cn
- Costa Rica: ac.cr
- Cyprus: ac.cy
- Fiji: ac.fj
- India: ac.in
- Indonesia: ac.id
- Iran: ac.ir
- Israel: ac.il
- Japan: ac.jp
- Kenya: ac.ke
- Morocco: ac.ma
- New Zealand: ac.nz
- North Korea: ac.kp (also uses aca.kp)
- Papua New Guinea: ac.pg
- Rwanda: ac.rw
- Serbia: ac.rs
- South Africa: ac.za
- South Korea: ac.kr
- South Sudan: ac.ss
- Sri Lanka: ac.lk
- Tanzania: ac.tz
- Thailand: ac.th
- Uganda: ac.ug
- United Kingdom: ac.uk
- United Arab Emirates: ac.ae
- Uzbekistan: ac.uz
- Zambia: ac.zm
- Zimbabwe: ac.zw

== See also ==
- ac (a first-level domain for the Ascension Island but also used worldwide)
- .edu_(second-level_domain)
