= N2n =

n2n
- Developer: n2n team
- Initial release: March 27, 2008
- Stable release: 3.0 / 27 October 2021; 4 years ago
- Written in: C
- Operating system: FreeBSD, Linux, OpenWrt, Mac OS X, Unix, Windows, Android
- Type: VPN
- License: GNU General Public License
- Website: https://www.ntop.org/products/n2n/
- Repository: https://github.com/ntop/n2n

n2n is an open source Layer 2 over Layer 3 VPN app utilising peer-to-peer architecture for network membership and routing.

Unlike many other VPN programs, n2n can also connect computers which reside behind NAT routers. These connections are set up with help from a third computer that both computers can reach. This computer, called a supernode, can then route the information between NATed nodes.

It is free software licensed under the terms of the GNU General Public License v3.

n3n forked from n2n in 2023.

Turbo VPN is a custom Windows server/client implementation of n2n.
