= TRABİS =

Organization responsible for administering .tr domain

TR Network Information System
- Turkish: TR Ağ bilgi sistemi
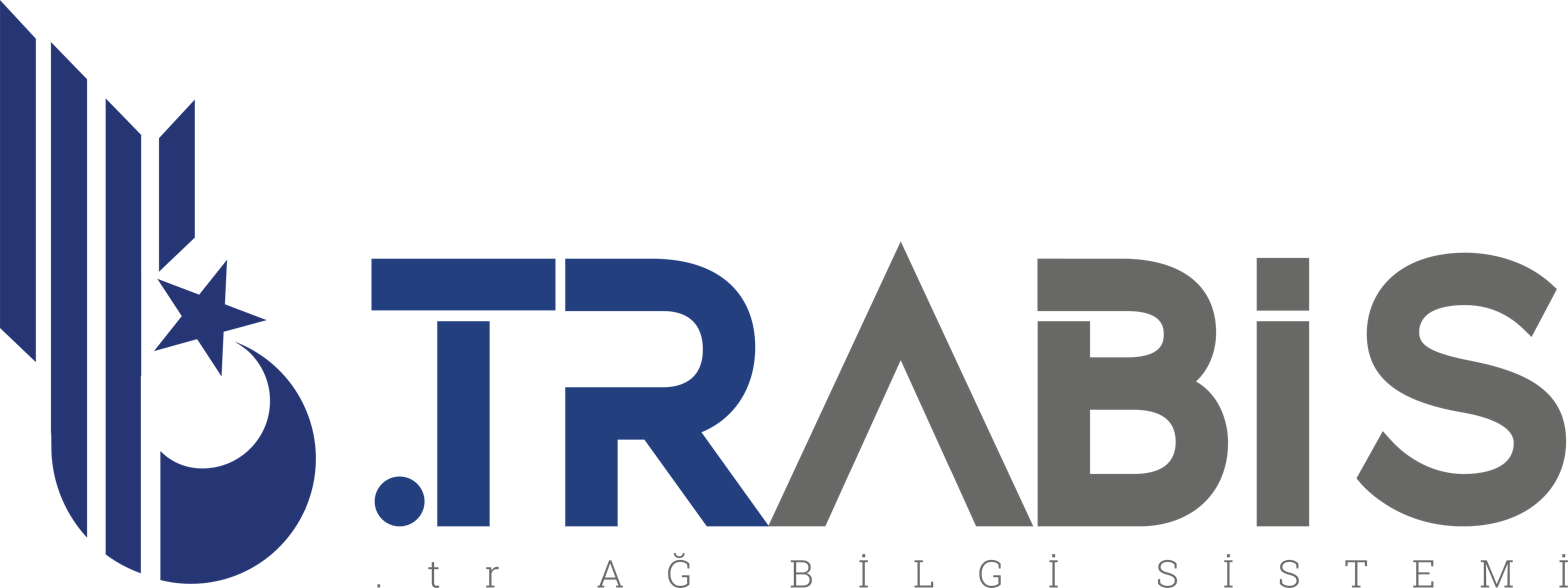
- logo of TRABİS

Agency overview
- Formed: 14 September 2022; 3 years ago
- Preceding agency: Nic.TR
- Status: Active
- Headquarters: Çankaya District, Ankara
- Parent department: Information and Communication Technologies Authority
- Website: trabis.gov.tr

The TR Network Information System (Turkish: TR Ağ Bilgi Sistemi, abbreviation: TRABİS) is the organization which is responsible for administering the .tr country code top-level domain name. It was founded on 14 September 2022. It is a subsidiary of the Information and Communication Technologies Authority.

== History ==
Although TRABİS started to be gradually introduced in 2010s, its operation did not start until 2022. Between 1991 and 2022, the organization responsible for the management of the .tr domain was Nic.TR, a part of Middle East Technical University. However, with the publication in the Official Gazette dated 10 November 2008, the Information and Communication Technologies Authority (BTK) have had a say in the management of the TLD. It has been understood that the management of the domain name would gradually be transferred from Nic.TR to BTK following this decision.

As of 23 March 2020, Nic.TR stopped managing .tr domains except "gov.tr, edu.tr, av.tr, bel.tr, dr.tr, tsk.tr, k12.tr, pol.tr and kep.tr" which are mostly government-related ones. With the establishment of TRABİS on 14 September 2022, all the .tr second level domains started to be administered by them.

Between September 2023 and August 2024, the plain .tr domain were launched on the market step by step.
