= WiscNet =

Networking services in Wisconsin

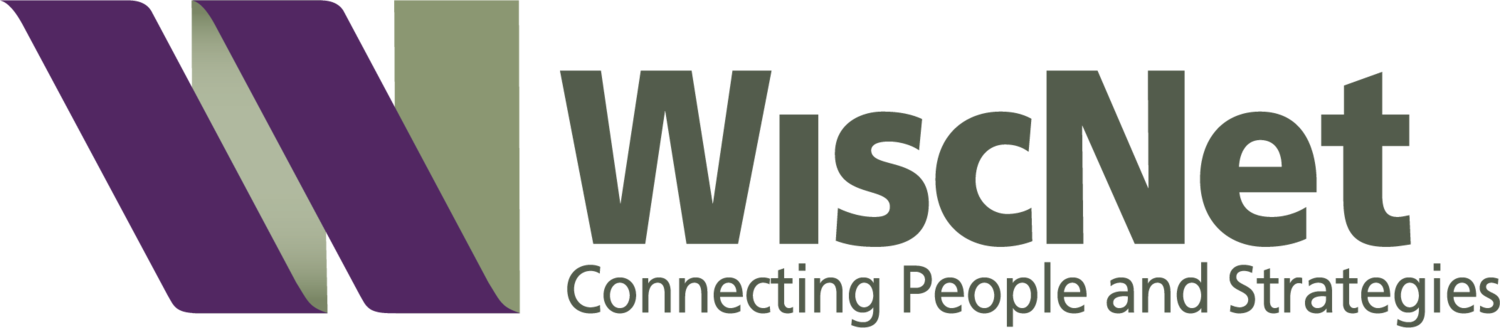
- Type: Nonprofit
- Region served: Wisconsin
- Services: Internet access
- Website: https://www.wiscnet.net/
- ASNs: 2381, 2382

WiscNet is a non-profit organization that maintains a computer network for Internet access for school districts, colleges, universities, and libraries in the U.S. state of Wisconsin. As of 2013, WiscNet was the Internet provider for over half of school districts and public libraries in the state. WiscNet was founded in 1990. Its services are not restricted to government owned institutions.
