= 5-centimeter band =

Amateur radio frequency band

The 5-centimeter or 5 GHz band is a portion of the SHF (microwave) radio spectrum internationally allocated to amateur radio and amateur satellite use on a secondary basis. In ITU regions 1 and 3, the amateur radio band is between 5,650 MHz and 5,850 MHz. In ITU region 2, the amateur radio band is between 5,650 MHz and 5,925 MHz. The amateur satellite service is allocated 5,830 to 5,850 MHz, for down-links only on a secondary basis, and it is also allocated 5,650 to 5,670 MHz, for up-links only on a non-interference basis to other users (ITU footnote 5.282). Amateur stations must accept harmful interference from ISM users operating in the band. The band is within the IEEE C Band spectrum.

The 5 cm band in the United States overlaps part of the U-NII band and all of 5 GHz ISM band. Both overlapping bands are available for license-free applications such as WiFi or Part 15 devices.

5 cm is one of the primary bands for high-speed multimedia radio, as most U-NII and Part 15 equipment may be re-tuned to amateur frequencies.

== List of notable frequencies ==
ITU regions. Region 1 Region 2 Region 3

- 5,668.2 MHz Region 1 Calling Frequency 1
- 5,760.1 MHz Region 2 Calling Frequency
- 5,760.2 MHz Region 1 Calling Frequency 2
- 5,800 MHz ISM band center frequency

== See also ==
- Amateur radio frequency allocations

Range	Band	ITU Region 1	ITU Region 2	ITU Region 3
LF	2200 m	135.7–137.8 kHz		
MF	630 m	472–479 kHz		
MF	160 m	1.810–1.850 MHz	1.800–2.000 MHz	
HF	80 / 75 m	3.500–3.800 MHz	3.500–4.000 MHz	3.500–3.900 MHz
HF	60 m	5.3515–5.3665 MHz		
HF	40 m	7.000–7.200 MHz	7.000–7.300 MHz	7.000–7.200 MHz
HF	30 m^{[t2]}	10.100–10.150 MHz		
HF	20 m	14.000–14.350 MHz		
HF	17 m^{[t2]}	18.068–18.168 MHz		
HF	15 m	21.000–21.450 MHz		
HF	12 m^{[t2]}	24.890–24.990 MHz		
HF	10 m	28.000–29.700 MHz		
VHF	8 m^{[t3]}	40.000–40.700 MHz	—	
VHF	6 m	50.000–52.000 MHz (50.000–54.000 MHz)^{[t4]}	50.000–54.000 MHz	
VHF	5 m^{[t3]}	58.000–60.100 MHz	—	
VHF	4 m^{[t3]}	70.000–70.500 MHz	—	
VHF	2 m	144.000–146.000 MHz	144.000–148.000 MHz	
VHF	1.25 m	—	220.000–225.000 MHz	—
UHF	70 cm	430.000–440.000 MHz	430.000–440.000 MHz (420.000–450.000 MHz)^{[t4]}	
UHF	33 cm	—	902.000–928.000 MHz	—
UHF	23 cm	1.240–1.300 GHz		
UHF	13 cm	2.300–2.450 GHz		
SHF	9 cm	3.400–3.475 GHz^{[t4]}	3.300–3.500 GHz	
SHF	5 cm	5.650–5.850 GHz	5.650–5.925 GHz	5.650–5.850 GHz
SHF	3 cm	10.000–10.500 GHz		
SHF	1.2 cm	24.000–24.250 GHz		
EHF	6 mm	47.000–47.200 GHz		
EHF	4 mm^{[t4]}	75.500 GHz^{[t3]} – 81.500 GHz	76.000–81.500 GHz	
EHF	2.5 mm	122.250–123.000 GHz		
EHF	2 mm	134.000–141.000 GHz		
EHF	1 mm	241.000–250.000 GHz		
THF	Sub-mm	Some administrations have authorized spectrum for amateur use in this region; others have declined to regulate frequencies above 300 GHz.		
[t1]	All allocations are subject to variation by country. For simplicity, only common allocations found internationally are listed. See a band's article for specifics.			
[t2]	HF allocation created at the 1979 World Administrative Radio Conference. These are commonly called the "WARC bands".			
[t3]	This is not mentioned in the ITU's Table of Frequency Allocations, but many individual administrations have commonly adopted this allocation under "Article 4.4".			
[t4]	This includes a currently active footnote allocation mentioned in the ITU's Table of Frequency Allocations. These allocations may only apply to a group of countries.			
See also: Radio spectrum, Electromagnetic spectrum
