= Internet background noise =

Network traffic lacking a routable destination

Internet background noise (IBN), also known as Internet background radiation (IBR, by analogy with natural background radiation), consists of data packets on the Internet addressed to IP addresses or ports where there is no network device set up to receive them. Network telescopes observe the Internet background radiation.

These packets often contain unsolicited commercial or network control messages, backscatters, port scans, and worm activities.

Smaller devices such as DSL modems may have a hard-coded IP address to look up the correct time using the Network Time Protocol. If, for some reason, the hard-coded NTP server is no longer available, faulty software might retry failed requests up to every second, which, if many devices are affected, generates a significant amount of unnecessary request traffic.

== History ==
In the first 10 years of the Internet, there was very little background noise, but with its commercialization in the 1990s, the noise factor became a permanent feature.

It was estimated in the early 2000s that the average dial-up modem user lost around 20 bits per second of their bandwidth to unsolicited traffic. During that decade, the amount of background noise for an IPv4 /8 address block (which contains 16.7 million address) increased from 1 to 50 Mbit/s (1 KB/s to 6.25 MB/s). By November 2010, it was estimated that 5.5 gigabits (687.5 megabytes) of background noise were being generated every second. In the following 15 years, this number has likely increased to a traffic rate in the order of hundreds of gigabits per second by 2025.

The newer IPv6 protocol, which has a much larger address space, makes it more difficult for viruses to scan ports and also limits the impact of misconfigured equipment.

The Conficker worm was responsible in 2010 for a large amount of background noise generated by viruses looking for new victims. In addition to malicious activities, misconfigured hardware and leaks from private networks are also sources of background noise.

Internet background noise has been used to detect significant changes in Internet traffic and connectivity during the 2011 political unrest from IP address blocks that were geolocated to Libya.

== Types ==
Backscatter is a term coined by Vern Paxson to describe Internet background noise resulting from a DDoS attack using multiple spoofed addresses. This noise is used by network telescopes to indirectly observe large scale attacks in real time.
