= List of streaming media services =

A streaming media service is an online provider that allows users to watch or listen to content, such as films, TV series, music, or podcasts, over the Internet. Instead of downloading the content to a media device, users can stream it in real-time, which means they can start watching or listening immediately without having to wait for the entire file to download. Streaming services offer instant access to content, allowing users to watch or listen on-demand without the need for downloads or physical media. Some streaming services started as an add-on to a Blu-ray video title as a supplement to the material watched. Popular examples of video and audio streaming services include Netflix, YouTube, Disney+, Audible, and Spotify.

Over-the-top media service (OTT) (also known as streaming platform) is a streaming media service delivered via the public Internet. OTT television bypasses terrestrial, cable, and satellite transmissions, the systems that have traditionally been the controllers or distributors of television content. As with broadcast networks and cable channels, many major film studios are involved in the production of the content provided by streaming television platforms.

Digital streaming acts in a similar way to video on demand in that the program to watch is selected. But the program is not recorded or stored like it might be on TiVo, etc. Digital video purchases grant a user indefinite access to a show or film, but the terms and conditions vary as to whether the file can be downloaded or must be streamed.

A client end-user can use a streaming device, smart TV, computer, or smartphone to start and continue playing digital video content before the entire file is transmitted. Users will need an Internet connection to stream or download video content. Users lacking compatible hardware or software systems may be unable to stream or download certain content.

== Video on demand streaming platforms ==
=== 100+ million subscribers ===
| Service | Parent | Launch | Country of origin | Subscribers | Content | Areas served | Ref. |
|---|---|---|---|---|---|---|---|
| Netflix | Netflix, Inc. | January 16, 2007 (Note: As a streaming video provider) | United States | 325 million | Netflix Originals, Studio Ghibli, (Note: Excluding Japan and the United States.) Warner Bros. Entertainment, Wizarding World, BBC Studios, ITV Studios, Studio 100, WildBrain, Wow Unlimited Media, Lionsgate Studios, Bento Box Entertainment, MarVista Entertainment, Chicken Soup for the Soul Entertainment, STX Entertainment, Skydance Media, Gaumont, Xilam, A&E Networks, ABS-CBN Studios, GMA Network, Viva Entertainment, Regal Entertainment, Astro Shaw, Primeworks Studios, CJ ENM, JTBC, Sony Pictures Entertainment, NFL, MLB, WWE, licensed content from other vendors. | Worldwide (Note: Except in Mainland China, North Korea, Russia, and Syria.) | |
| JioHotstar | JioStar | February 11, 2015 (as Hotstar) February 14, 2025 (Note: Disney+ Hotstar India and JioCinema merged to form JioHotstar on February 14, 2025. Hotstar was launched on February 11, 2015 and rebranded as Disney+ Hotstar on April 3, 2020. JioCinema was launched on May 4, 2016.) | India | 280 million | JioHotstar Originals, Star Studios, Viacom18 Studios, Jio Studios, Disney+, Hulu, Peacock, Paramount+, HBO Max, The Pokémon Company, Muse Communication, licensed content from other vendors. | Canada, India, Singapore, United Kingdom | |
| Paramount+ | Skydance | March 4, 2021 (Note: Launched on October 28, 2014; as CBS All Access.) | United States | 252.7 million | Paramount+ Originals, CBS, CBS Sports, Paramount Pictures, Paramount Television Studios, Skydance Pictures, Miramax, Dimension Films, Republic Pictures, CMT, MTV, VH1, Nickelodeon Group, Comedy Central, Showtime Networks, Smithsonian Channel, BET, Tyler Perry Studios, NFL, UFC, Zuffa Boxing, licensed content from other vendors. | Worldwide | |
| HBO Max | Skydance | May 27, 2020 | United States | 252.7 million | HBO Inc., HBO Max Originals, Warner Bros. Pictures, Warner Bros. Television, The CW, Discovery Channel, Food Network, TLC, Asian Food Network, HGTV, ID, Travel Channel, Animal Planet, Magnolia Network, New Line Cinema, DC Studios, TNT Sports, CNN, BBC Studios, Major League Baseball, National Hockey League, The Cartoon Network Inc., TBS, TNT, TruTV, Wizarding World, Discovery+ Originals, Discovery Channel, OWN, licensed content from other vendors such as A&E Networks and ABS-CBN Studios. | Worldwide | |
| Discovery+ | Skydance | January 4, 2021 | United States | 252.7 million | HBO Inc., HBO Max Originals, Warner Bros. Pictures, Warner Bros. Television, The CW, Discovery Channel, Food Network, TLC, Asian Food Network, HGTV, ID, Travel Channel, Animal Planet, Magnolia Network, New Line Cinema, DC Studios, TNT Sports, CNN, BBC Studios, Major League Baseball, National Hockey League, The Cartoon Network Inc., TBS, TNT, TruTV, Wizarding World, Discovery+ Originals, Discovery Channel, OWN, licensed content from other vendors such as A&E Networks and ABS-CBN Studios. | Austria, Germany, India, Ireland, Italy, MENA, Norway, Sweden, United Kingdom, United States | |
| SkyShowtime | Skydance | September 20, 2022 | United States | 252.7 million | Paramount+ Originals, CBS, CBS Sports, Paramount Pictures, Paramount Television Studios, Skydance Pictures, Miramax, Dimension Films, Republic Pictures, CMT, MTV, VH1, Nickelodeon Group, Comedy Central, Showtime Networks, Smithsonian Channel, BET, Tyler Perry Studios, NFL, UFC, Zuffa Boxing, licensed content from other vendors. | Albania, Andorra, Bosnia & Herzegovina, Bulgaria, Croatia, Czechia, Denmark, Finland, Hungary, Kosovo, Montenegro, North Macedonia, Norway, Netherlands, Poland, Portugal, Romania, Serbia, Slovakia, Slovenia, Spain, Sweden | |
| Amazon Prime Video | Amazon | Amazon Prime Video: September 7, 2006 | United States | 205 million | Amazon Originals, Amazon MGM Studios, Metro-Goldwyn-Mayer, Orion Pictures, American International Pictures, Lightworkers Media, National Football League, WNBA, NBA, ABS-CBN Studios, GMA Network, Regal Entertainment, Viva Entertainment, Astro Shaw, Primeworks Studios, CJ ENM, JTBC, licensed content from other vendors. | Worldwide (Note: Except in Belarus, Mainland China, Cuba, Iran, North Korea, Russia, Sudan, Syria, and Vietnam.) | |
| MGM+ | Amazon | MGM+: October 30, 2009 | United States | 205 million | Amazon Originals, Amazon MGM Studios, Metro-Goldwyn-Mayer, Orion Pictures, American International Pictures, Lightworkers Media, National Football League, WNBA, NBA, ABS-CBN Studios, GMA Network, Regal Entertainment, Viva Entertainment, Astro Shaw, Primeworks Studios, CJ ENM, JTBC, licensed content from other vendors. | Worldwide | |
| Disney+ | The Walt Disney Company | Disney+: November 12, 2019 (Note: Disney+ Hotstar, then Hotstar, was launched in India on February 11, 2015.) | United States | 196 million | Disney+ Originals (Hulu), (Note: Selected first-party contents only.) Walt Disney Pictures, Walt Disney Animation Studios, Disney Branded Television, Pixar, Marvel Studios, Lucasfilm, National Geographic, ABC, The Muppets Studio, 20th Television, Freeform, FX Networks, 20th Century Studios, Searchlight Pictures, ESPN, NFL, NHL, College sports, WNBA, NBA, licensed content from other vendors. | Worldwide (Note: Except in Cuba, U.S. Virgin Islands, Sub-Saharan Africa, and majority of Asia and Oceania. Disney+ is available in South Africa and Southeast Asia (previously as Disney+ Hotstar).) | |
| Hulu | The Walt Disney Company | Hulu: October 29, 2007 | United States | 196 million | Disney+ Originals (Hulu), Walt Disney Pictures, Walt Disney Animation Studios, Disney Branded Television, Pixar, Marvel Studios, Lucasfilm, National Geographic, ABC, The Muppets Studio, 20th Television, Freeform, FX Networks, 20th Century Studios, Searchlight Pictures, ESPN, NFL, NHL, College sports, WNBA, NBA, licensed content from other vendors. | Worldwide | |
| YouTube Premium | Google (Alphabet) | November 14, 2014 | United States | 125 million | YouTube Originals, licensed content from other vendors. | 120 countries | |
| Tencent Video (Note: WeTV outside of China.) | Tencent Holdings Ltd. | June 2011 | China | 120 million | Tencent Video Originals, licensed content from other vendors. | Bangladesh, China, Hong Kong, Indonesia, Macau, Malaysia, Philippines, Singapore, South Korea, Taiwan, Thailand, Vietnam | |
| iQIYI | Baidu, Inc. | April 22, 2010 | China | 101.4 million | iQIYI Originals, licensed content from other vendors. | Worldwide | |

=== 50–100 million subscribers ===
| Service | Parent | Launch | Country of origin | Subscribers | Content | Areas served | Ref. |
|---|---|---|---|---|---|---|---|
| Youku | Alibaba Group | December 21, 2006 | China | 90 million | Youku Originals, licensed content from other vendors. | China | |
| Mango TV | Hunan Broadcasting System | April 20, 2014 (Note: As a streaming video provider.) | China | 73.31 million | MangoTV Originals, Hunan Television, Hunan Broadcasting System, licensed content from other vendors. | Worldwide | |
| ZEE5 | Zee Entertainment Enterprises | February 14, 2018 | India | 65.9 million | Zee5 Originals, Zee TV, &TV, Zee Marathi, Zee Yuva, Zee Sarthak, Zee Kannada, Zee Telugu, Zee Bangla, Zee Punjabi, Zee Keralam, Zee Tamizh, Zee Café, licensed content from other vendors. | 190+ countries | |
| Vidio | Emtek | October 15, 2014 | Indonesia | 60 million | Vidio original content, licensed content from other vendors. | Indonesia | |
| Apple TV | Apple Inc. | November 1, 2019 | United States | 60 million | Apple TV Originals, MLB, MLS, F1 | 114 countries | |

=== 10–50 million subscribers ===
| Service | Parent | Launch | Country of origin | Subscribers | Content | Areas served | Ref. |
|---|---|---|---|---|---|---|---|
| Peacock | NBCUniversal (Comcast) | April 15, 2020 (Note: Early access for Comcast Xfinity Flex and X1 customers. The service launched globally on July 15, 2020.) | United States | 48 million | Peacock Originals, NBC, NBC News, NBC Sports, Universal Pictures, Focus Features, DreamWorks Animation, Illumination, Universal Animation Studios, Universal Television, Telemundo, Bravo, NFL, MLB, WNBA, NBA, licensed content from other vendors. | Worldwide | |
| SonyLIV | Sony Pictures Networks India (Sony) | January 22, 2013 | India | 33.3 million | Sony TV, Sony SAB, Sony Marathi, Sony Ten, Sony Max, Sony Max 2, Sony PIX, Sony Six, licensed content from other vendors. | Canada, Europe, Middle East, Indo-Pacific, United States | |
| BiliBili | Bilibili Inc. | June 26, 2009 | China | 28.5 million | Bilibili Original, licensed content from other vendors. | Worldwide | |
| iflix | Tencent | May 27, 2014 | Malaysia | 25 million (Note: April 2020, Iflix has more than 25 million active users on its service, with over 2.5 billion minutes viewed in a month.) | Previous licensed content: The Walt Disney Company, MGM, Paramount Pictures, Warner Bros., Fox, and Starz | Bangladesh, Brunei, Cambodia, Indonesia, Malaysia, Maldives, Myanmar, Nepal, Pakistan, Philippines, Sri Lanka, Thailand, Vietnam | |
| Curiosity Stream | Curiosity | March 18, 2015 | United States | 25 million | Factual nonfiction content in science, history, mathematics, technology, robotics, and nature | 175 countries | |
| MBC Shahid | MBC Group | 2008 | Saudi Arabia | SVOD: 4.8 million AVOD: 17.8 million Total: 22.6 million | Shahid Originals, MBC Group, Rotana Media Group, Saudi Sports Company, Al Arabiya, SBA, licensed content from other vendors. | Worldwide | |
| WATCH IT | United Media Services | March 5, 2019 | Egypt | SVOD: 3.3 million AVOD: 17.1 million Total: 20.4 million | Al Hayah, CBC, Egyptian Television Network, Mehwar TV, National Media Authority, ON E, DMC TV, TeN TV licensed content from other vendors. | Worldwide | |
| Crunchyroll | Sony Group | May 14, 2006 | United States | 21 million | Aniplex, Kadokawa Corporation, Pony Canyon, Shogakukan, Shueisha, Toei Animation, licensed content from other vendors. | Worldwide | |
| DAZN | Access Industries | July 8, 2015 | United Kingdom | 20 million | DAZN original content, Eurosport, Sportdigital, Juventus TV, Inter TV, LFC TV, Milan TV, MLB Network, NBA TV, NFL Network, Golden Boy Promotions, UEFA Champions League, UFC, PGA Championship, Formula One, WWE. | Worldwide | |
| Lionsgate+ | Starz Entertainment | October 8, 2012 (Note: Starz On Demand launched on September 19, 2001. Starzplay Arabia launching on April 2, 2015. On September 28, 2022, Lionsgate announced the international Starzplay service would be rebranded as Lionsgate+.) | United States | 19.6 million (Note: OTT Subscribers includes subscribers of Starz Domestic, Lionsgate+, Lionsgate Play and Starz Play Arabia.) | Starz Original, Lionsgate, Lantern Entertainment, Dimension Films, (Note: post-2005) Hearst Entertainment, Tribune Entertainment, licensed content from other vendors. | India, Indonesia, (Lionsgate Play), Ireland, Malaysia, Pakistan, Philippines, (Lionsgate+) and 17 countries in the MENA region (Starzplay Arabia), United States and Canada (Starz). | |
| Eros Now | Eros Media World | August 2012 | India | 19 million (Note: As of March 31, 2021, Eros Now had 19.0 million Premium Paid subscribers. The other 20.9 million paid subscribers, who purchase content a la carte or with sachet pricing (including single downloads or subscriptions lasting a day or a week), are defined as Base Paid subscribers.) | Eros Now originals, Hum TV, ARY TV, licensed content from other vendors. | Worldwide | |
| Viu | Viu International Ltd (PCCW Media Limited) | October 26, 2015 | Hong Kong | 13.8 million | Viu Originals, licensed content from other vendors. | Bahrain, Egypt, Hong Kong, Indonesia, Jordan, Kuwait, Malaysia, Myanmar, Oman, Philippines, Qatar, Saudi Arabia, Singapore, South Africa, Thailand, United Arab Emirates | |
| VMX | Viva Communications | January 29, 2021 | Philippines | 12 million | VMX Originals, Viva Films, Viva Cinema, Studio Viva, licensed content from other vendors. | 78 countries | |
| Kinopoisk | Yandex | May 23, 2018 | Russia | 11.9 million | Kinopoisk originals, licensed content from other vendors. | Armenia, Azerbaijan, Belarus, Georgia, Kazakhstan, Kyrgyzstan, Moldova, Russia, Uzbekistan | |
| iWant | ABS-CBN Corporation | January 8, 2010 | Philippines | 11 million | iWant Originals, ABS-CBN channels like S+A, ANC, Kapamilya Channel, DZMM TeleRadyo, ABS-CBN Studios, Star Cinema, GMA Network, GTV, Regal Entertainment, Viva Films, Studio Viva, MediaQuest Holdings | Worldwide | |

=== 1–10 million subscribers ===
| Service | Parent | Launch | Country of origin | Subscribers | Content | Areas served | Ref. |
|---|---|---|---|---|---|---|---|
| YouTube TV | Google | April 5, 2017 | United States | 10 million | 100+ TV networks, including ABC, CBS, NBC affiliates, The CW, FOX, and PBS. | United States | |
| Rakuten TV | Rakuten Group | 2010 | Japan; Spain | 7 million | Starz Play, (Note: Available in France, Germany, Italy, Spain, and the United Kingdom.) licensed content from other vendors. | Europe and Japan | |
| Globoplay | Grupo Globo | November 3, 2015 | Brazil | 6.5 million | Globoplay Originals, TV Globo, licensed content from other vendors. | Australia, Austria, Belgium, Brazil, Canada, Denmark, Finland, France, Germany, Greece, Ireland, Italy, Japan, Luxembourg, Netherlands, Norway, Portugal, Spain, Sweden, Switzerland, United Kingdom, United States | |
| FuboTV | FuboTV | January 1, 2015 | United States | 6.2 million | NFL, MLB, NBA, NHL, MLS and international association football, includes cable television channels like ABC, CBS, Fox, NBC, ESPN | Canada, Spain, United States | |
| Viaplay | Viaplay Group | May 2007 | Sweden | 5.55 million | Viaplay Originals, Nickelodeon, Sport, licensed content from other vendors. | Australia, Austria, Germany, Netherlands, Nordics, Switzerland | |
| U-Next | U-Next Holdings | June 1, 2007 | Japan | 5 million | NBCUniversal, Skydance, Paravi, TBS Television, TV Tokyo, Wowow, licensed content from other vendors. | Japan | |
| TVING | CJ ENM | October 2, 2020 | South Korea | 5 million (Note: Subscribers from South Korea only.) | TVING Originals, TvN, Mnet, OCN, Tooniverse, Paramount+, licensed content from other vendors. | Japan, South Korea, Taiwan | |
| GagaOOLala | Portico Media Company Ltd. | 2017 | Taiwan | 5 million | GOL Studios | Worldwide | |
| Hulu + Live TV | The Walt Disney Company | May 3, 2017 | United States | 4.4 million | 100+ TV networks including ABC and ESPN | United States | |
| Fox Nation | Fox | Fox Nation: November 27, 2018 | United States | Fox Nation: 2.5 million | Fox News Media Originals and Fox Sports Media Originals | United States and U.S. territories | |
| Fox One | Fox | Fox One: August 21, 2025 | United States | Fox One: 2.3 million | Fox News Media Originals and Fox Sports Media Originals | United States and U.S. territories | |
| - | Fox | - | United States | Total: 4.8 million | Fox News Media Originals and Fox Sports Media Originals | United States and U.S. territories | |
| Crave | Bell Media | October 30, 2014 | Canada | 4.6 million | Crave Originals, Bell Media, HBO, Showtime, Starz, licensed content from other vendors. | Canada | |
| Artear+ | Grupo Clarín | May 28, 2016 | Argentina | SVOD: 3.5 million | Artear+ Originals, El Trece, Arcine, Artear+ Niños | United States, Hispanic America | |
| Showmax | MultiChoice Group | August 19, 2015 | South Africa | 3.1 million | Hollywood, British, Kenyan, Nickelodeon, Disney, Cartoon Network, Boomerang, ABC, HBO and South African content. | Africa | |
| Hulu Japan | Nippon Television Network | September 1, 2011 | Japan | 2.8 million | Hulu Japan Originals, Nippon TV, licensed content from other vendors. | Japan | |
| Stan. | Nine Entertainment | April 1, 2014 | Australia | 2.6 million | Stan Originals, Nine Network, NBCUniversal, Lionsgate, Sony Pictures, Village Roadshow, ABC Commercial, Paramount Skydance, licensed content from other vendors. | Australia | |
| D Anime Store | NTT Docomo; Kadokawa | July 3, 2012 | Japan | 2.5 million | Kadokawa, content licensed from other vendors. | Japan | |
| Aha | Arha Media & Broadcasting Private Limited | March 25, 2020 | India | 2.5 million | Aha Originals | India | |
| NOW | Sky Group (Comcast) | July 17, 2012 | United Kingdom | 2.21 million (Note: Subscribers from the United Kingdom only.) | Sky channels, Nickelodeon, Cartoon Network, DeA Kids, (Note: Italy only.) Comedy Central, licensed content from other vendors. | Austria, Germany, Ireland, Italy, Switzerland, United Kingdom, United States | |
| Telasa | KDDI; TV Asahi | May 15, 2012 | Japan | 2.2 million | Telasa Originals, TV Asahi, licensed content from other vendors. | Japan | |
| BritBox (Note: Merged with ITVX in the United Kingdom.) | ITV plc BBC Studios/BBC | March 7, 2017 | United Kingdom | 2 million (Note: 1.5 million in the United States and Canada October 2020, 0.5 million in the United Kingdom March 2020.) | BritBox Originals, BBC, ITV, Channel 4, (Note: United Kingdom only) Channel 5, Comedy Central, Endemol Shine, (Note: United States and Canada only.) ITVX originals, (Note: United Kingdom only.) StudioCanal, (Note: United Kingdom only.) licensed content from other vendors. | Australia, Canada, South Africa, United Kingdom, United States | |
| Lemino | NTT Docomo | November 18, 2011 | Japan | 2 million | Lemino Originals, Hikari TV, Wowow, licensed content from other vendors. | Japan | |
| Angel Studios | | 2023 | United States | 2 million | Original and licensed content. | United States, Canada, other countries are coming soon | |
| Sling TV | Dish Network (EchoStar) | February 9, 2015 | United States | 1.89 million | 50+ TV networks | United States | |
| Mubi | | February 14, 2007 | United Kingdom | 1.7 million | Licensed content from other vendors. | 200 territories | |
| Neon | Sky Network Television Limited | February 1, 2015 | New Zealand | 1.7 million (Note: Subscribers include former Lightbox users merged into Neon in 2020.) | Warner Bros., HBO, NBCUniversal, Sony Pictures Television, BBC Studios, MGM, licensed content from other vendors. | New Zealand | |
| Smash. | Showroom | October 22, 2020 | Japan | 1.63 million | Original content. | Japan and South Korea | |
| Kayo Sports | Foxtel | November 26, 2018 | Australia | 1.61 million | Fox Sports, ESPN Australia, belN Sports, Racing.com | Australia | |
| Binge | Foxtel | May 25, 2020 | Australia | 1.53 million | All3Media, NBCUniversal, Sony Pictures Television, StudioCanal, Paramount Skydance, ITV Studios | Australia | |
| Abema Premium | CyberAgent; TV Asahi | April 2017 | Japan | 1.5 million | Abema Originals, TV Asahi, licensed content from other vendors. | Japan | |
| DMM TV | DMM | December 1, 2022 | Japan | 1.5 million | DMM TV Originals, licensed content from other vendors. | Japan | |
| FOD | Fuji Television | September 2005 | Japan | 1.5 million | FOD Originals, Fuji Television, Fuji Television ONE TWO NEXT, licensed content from other vendors. | Japan | |
| Philo | A&E Networks | November 14, 2017 | United States | 1.3 million (Note: November 2020) | Licensed content from other vendors. | United States | |
| Videoland | RTL Nederland | 2010 | Netherlands | 1.006 million (Note: As of May 2021.) | RTL NL and Videoland original content, licensed content from other vendors. | Netherlands | |
| HayU | Comcast | March 1, 2016 | United States | 1 million (Note: 200,000 in Australia, 5% of households in the United Kingdom.) | E!, Bravo, NBCUniversal, licensed content from other vendors. | Australia, Austria, Benelux, Canada, Central and Eastern Europe, Cyprus, France, Germany, Hong Kong, Iberia, Ireland, Italy, Malta, New Zealand, Nordics, Philippines, Singapore, Spain, Switzerland, Turkey | |
| Acorn TV | AMC Networks | August 15, 2013 | United Kingdom | 1 million (Note: Subscribers from the United States and Canada only.) | Acorn Media Group, BBC Studios, ITV, Channel 4, All3Media, DRG, ZDF, Content Media, licensed content from other vendors. | Australia, Canada, Ireland, New Zealand, United Kingdom, United States | |
| Shudder | AMC Networks | 2015 | United States | 3 million (Note: Subscribers from the United States only.) | Shudder Originals, AMC Networks, licensed content from other vendors. | Australia, Canada, Ireland, New Zealand, United Kingdom, United States | |
| Howdy | Roku | 2025 | United States | 1 million | Content from Lionsgate, FilmRise, Sony Pictures, Disney, NBCUniversal and Warner Bros. Discovery, licensed content from other vendors. | United States and Mexico | |
| Dropout | Independent (Formerly majority owned IAC, still a minority stakeholder) | September 26, 2018 | United States | 1 million | Originally developed, produced, and distributed content with a focus on short and long-form improv comedy, actual play, and panel shows, as well as a back catalog of CollegeHumor's content including sketches and scripted comedy. | Worldwide | |

=== Fewer than 1 million subscribers ===
| Service | Parent | Launch | Country of origin | Subscribers | Content | Areas served | Ref. |
|---|---|---|---|---|---|---|---|
| Nebula | Nebula Entertainment & Broadcasting LLC | May 23, 2019 | United States | 680,000 (Note: January 2024) | Sponsorship-free content by over 175 creators who collectively have over 120 million collective YouTube subscribers. | United States and Worldwide | |
| Atresplayer Premium | Atresmedia | September 8, 2019 | Spain | 670,000 (Note: Q4 2024) | Atresmedia | Americas and Spain | |
| Venevisión Play | Grupo Cisneros | August 25, 2023 | Venezuela | 600,000 | Venevisión telenovelas, Miss Venezuela, licensed content from other vendors. | Venezuela | |
| DigitAlb | Digit-Alb Sh.A | July 15, 2022 | Albania | 567,000 | Licensed content from third-parties. | Worldwide | |
| BlazeTV | Blaze Media | September 12, 2011 | United States | 450,000 (Note: Q4 2020) | Glenn Beck Program, Levin TV, Louder with Crowder | United States | |
| AMC+ | AMC Networks | 2020 | United States | 100,000 (Note: Over 2 million combined subscribers with other AMC Streaming Services including (Acorn TV, Shudder, Sundance Now and UMC).) | AMC Originals, AMC Networks, licensed content from other vendors. | Australia, Canada, India, New Zealand, South Korea, Spain, United States | |
| IFC Films Unlimited | AMC Networks | 2019 | United States | 100,000 | IFC Originals, AMC Networks, licensed content from other vendors. | United States and Canada | |
| Sundance Now | AMC Networks | 2014 | United States | 100,000 | Sundance TV Originals, AMC Networks, licensed content from other vendors. | United States | |
| Allblk | AMC Networks | 2020 | United States | 100,000 | Allblk Originals, AMC Networks, licensed content from other vendors. | United States | |
| We TV+ | AMC Networks | 2020 | United States | 100,000 | We TV Originals, AMC Networks, licensed content from other vendors. | United States | |

=== Unknown amount of subscribers ===
| Service | Parent | Launch | Country of origin | Content | Areas served | Ref. |
|---|---|---|---|---|---|---|
| Criterion Channel | The Criterion Collection | 2019 | United States | Licensed content from other vendors. | United States and Canada | |
| ETV Win | ETV Network | 2019 | India | ETV Win Originals | India | |
| SOMM TV | Forgotten Man Films | 2019 | United States | Original and licensed content. | Worldwide | |
| WOW Presents Plus | World of Wonder | November 2017 | United States | Original and exclusive content. | Worldwide | |

== Free ad-supported television (FAST) ==
Free ad-supported television
| Service | Parent | Launch | Country of origin | Monthly Active Users (MAU) | Platform | Content Linear | Content SVOD | Content Linear Originals | Content SVOD Originals | Areas served | Ref. |
|---|---|---|---|---|---|---|---|---|---|---|---|
| Roku Channel | Roku | September 6, 2017 | United States | 145 million | Roku | Yes | Yes | Yes | Quibi Originals, Roku Originals | Canada, Mexico, United Kingdom, United States | |
| Tubi | Fox | April 1, 2014 | United States | 100 million | | Yes | Yes | Yes | Tubi Originals | Australia, Canada, Latin America, New Zealand, United Kingdom, United States | |
| Pluto TV | Skydance | August 2, 2013 | United States | 80 million | | Yes | Yes | Yes | No | Canada, Europe, Latin America, United States | |
| Abema | CyberAgent / TV Asahi | April 11, 2016 | Japan | 34.09 million | Amazon Fire TV, Apple TV, Chromecast, iOS, Android | Yes | Yes | Yes | Abema Originals | Japan | |
| Samsung TV Plus | Samsung | November 12, 2015 | South Korea | 17.4 million | Samsung TV OS | Yes | Yes | Yes | No | Worldwide | |
| GalxyTV | Invincinble Entertainment Corp. | 2026 | United States | | Roku, Vizio | Yes | Yes | No | No | United States, Canada, Europe, Australia | |
| Crackle | Chicken Soup for the Soul | May 4, 2007 | United States | 40 million | | No | Yes | No | Crackle Originals | United States | |
| FilmRise | Comcast / Charter Communication | 2012 | United States | 31.5 million | | No | Yes | No | No | Worldwide | |
| Xumo | Comcast / Charter Communication | 2011 | United States | 24 million | | Yes | Yes | Yes | No | United States, Canada | |
| Facebook Watch | Meta | August 10, 2017 | United States | 1.25 billion | | No | Yes | No | Facebook Watch Originals | Worldwide | |
| Amazon Freevee | Amazon | January 11, 2019 | United States | | | No | Yes | No | Amazon Freevee Originals | United States, United Kingdom, Germany | |
| LG Channels | LG | August 16, 2016 | South Korea | | LG TV OS | Yes | Yes | Yes | No | Worldwide | |
| WatchFree+ | Vizio | August 1, 2018 | United States | 17.4 million | Vizio TV OS | Yes | Yes | Yes | No | Worldwide | |
| Plex TV | Plex | July 23, 2020 | United States | 16 million | Amazon Fire TV, Apple TV, Chromecast, Roku, Nvidia Shield TV, iOS, Android | Yes | Yes | Yes | No | Worldwide | |
| YouTube | Google | March 23, 2022 | United States | | | No | Yes | No | No | Worldwide | |
| Free Stream | Sling TV | February 9, 2023 | United States | | Roku | Yes | Yes | No | No | United States | |

== Streaming by broadcast and cable television networks ==
The following services are owned and operated by terrestrial and cable television networks, or other conglomerates in that market. They are major content producers, and their streaming services provide the digital distribution of content that often first airs on their networks or channels.

Streaming linear television
| Service | Supporting company/companies | Regional availability | Website-based | Windows application | Mac application | Linux application | iOS application | Android application | Console application | TV set application | Set Top Box application | Free |
|---|---|---|---|---|---|---|---|---|---|---|---|---|
| 7plus | Southern Cross Media Group | Australia | Yes | No | No | No | Yes | Yes | PS4, PS5 | Android TV, Samsung, LG, Panasonic, Philips | Apple TV, Chromecast, Amazon Fire TV | Yes |
| 9Now | Nine Entertainment | Australia | Yes | No | No | No | Yes | Yes | PS4 (discontinued) | Android TV, Samsung, LG, Panasonic, Philips | Apple TV, Chromecast, Amazon Fire TV, Roku | Yes |
| 10 | Paramount Networks UK & Australia (Paramount Skydance) | Australia | Yes | No | No | No | Yes | Yes | Xbox 360 (discontinued), Xbox One, Xbox Series X/S | Android TV, Samsung, LG, Panasonic, Philips | Apple TV, Chromecast, Amazon Fire TV | Yes |
| ABC | Walt Disney Television (The Walt Disney Company) | United States | Yes | No | No | No | Yes | Yes | PS4, PS5, Xbox One, Xbox Series X/S | Android TV, Samsung, Vizio | Amazon Fire TV, Roku, Apple TV, Chromecast | Yes |
| ABC iview | ABC | Australia | Yes | No | No | No | Yes | Yes | PS3 (discontinued), PS4, PS5, Xbox 360 (discontinued), Xbox One, Xbox Series X/S | Android TV, Samsung, LG, Sony, Panasonic, Philips | Apple TV, Chromecast, Amazon Fire TV | Yes |
| Adult Swim | Skydance | United States | Yes | No | No | No | Yes | Yes | None | None | Amazon Fire TV, Roku | (Note: Some content is free, but many programs require a pay-TV subscription.) |
| APSFL IPTV | SAYT-TV2 | India | No | No | No | No | No | Yes | None | None | APSFL IPTV and video on Demand | Yes |
| BBC iPlayer | BBC | United Kingdom | Yes | Yes | Yes | Yes | Yes | Yes | Wii, PS3, PS4, PS5, Xbox 360, Xbox One, Xbox Series X/S | Android TV, Samsung, LG, Sony, Panasonic, Philips | Virgin Media On Demand, Freesat, Amazon Fire TV, Roku, Apple TV, Chromecast | No |
| CBC Gem | CBC/Radio-Canada | Canada | Yes | No | No | No | Yes | Yes | None | Android TV | Amazon Fire TV, Roku, Apple TV, Chromecast | Yes |
| CBS | Skydance Direct-to-Consumer (Skydance) | United States | Yes | No | No | No | Yes | Yes | PS4, PS5, Xbox One, Xbox Series X/S | Android TV, Samsung, Vizio | Amazon Fire TV, Roku, Apple TV, Chromecast | Yes |
| Channel 4 | Channel 4 | United Kingdom; Ireland | Yes | Yes | Yes | No | Yes | Yes | PS3, PS4, PS5, Xbox 360, Xbox One, Xbox Series X/S | Android TV | Virgin Media On Demand, Amazon Fire TV, Roku, Apple TV, Chromecast | Yes |
| Eros Now | Eros | India | Yes | Yes | Yes | No | Yes | Yes | None | Android TV, Samsung, LG, Sony, Panasonic, Philips | Bollywood on Demand, Amazon Fire TV, Roku, Apple TV, Chromecast | Yes |
| 5 | 5, Skydance | United Kingdom | Yes | No | No | Yes | Yes | Yes | None | Samsung Smart TV, LG Smart TV, Google TV | Amazon Fire TV, Apple TV, Chromecast, Now TV, Roku, Sky Glass, Virgin Media On Demand | No |
| Foxtel Now | Foxtel | Australia | Yes | No | No | No | Yes | Yes | PS4 and PS5 | Android TV, Samsung, LG, Sony, Hisense | Apple TV and Chromecast | No |
| Global Video | Global | Canada | Yes | No | No | No | Yes | Yes | None | Android TV | Amazon Fire TV, Roku, Apple TV, Chromecast | No |
| Ici TOU.TV | CBC/Radio-Canada | Canada | Yes | No | No | No | Yes | Yes | None | Android TV | Amazon Fire TV, Roku, Apple TV, Chromecast | Yes |
| ITVX | ITV | United Kingdom | Yes | Yes | Yes | Yes | Yes | Yes | PS3, PS4, PS5, Xbox 360, Xbox One, Xbox Series X/S | Android TV | Virgin Media On Demand, Amazon Fire TV, Roku, Apple TV, Chromecast | Yes |
| JioTV | LYF | India | No | No | No | No | Yes | Yes | None | None | Jio on Demand | Yes |
| myTV | OSN, Rotana Media Group, SNA Corp | Americas and Australasia | No | No | No | No | Yes | Yes | None | Samsung Smart TV, LG Smart TV, Google TV | Western Digital, Boxee Box, Netgear NTV 300, Google TV devices, Samsung and Android tablets | No |
| NBC | NBCUniversal (Comcast) | United States | Yes | No | No | No | Yes | Yes | PS3, Xbox 360, Xbox One, Xbox Series X/S | Android TV, Samsung, Vizio | Amazon Fire TV, Roku, Apple TV, Chromecast | Yes |
| NRK TV | NRK | Norway | Yes | No | No | No | Yes | Yes | PS3, PS4, PS5, Xbox 360, Xbox One, Xbox Series X/S | Samsung Smart TV, LG Smart TV, Google TV | Western Digital, Boxee Box, Netgear NTV 300, Google TV devices, Samsung and Android tablets | Yes |
| PBS | PBS | United States | Yes | No | No | No | Yes | Yes | None | Android TV, Samsung, Vizio | Apple TV, Amazon Fire TV, Chromecast, Roku | Yes |
| PBS Kids | PBS | United States | Yes | No | No | No | Yes | Yes | None | Android TV, Samsung, Vizio | Apple TV, Amazon Fire TV, Chromecast, Roku | Yes |
| Pilipinas Live | Cignal TV, TV5 | Philippines | Yes | No | No | No | Yes | Yes | – | Android TV | | No |
| PTCL Smart TV App | PTCL | Pakistan | Yes | Yes | No | No | Yes | Yes | None | None | Standalone PTCL Smart Settop Box | No |
| RTÉ Player | RTÉ | Ireland | Yes | No | No | No | Yes | Yes | None | Android TV | Apple TV and Chromecast | Yes |
| RTP Play | RTP | Portugal; Worldwide | Yes | No | No | No | Yes | Yes | None | Android TV, Samsung, LG | Apple TV, Chromecast, Amazon Fire TV, MEO, NOS, Vodafone | Yes |
| SBS On Demand | SBS | Australia | Yes | No | No | No | Yes | Yes | PS3 (discontinued), PS4 (discontinued), Xbox 360 (discontinued), Xbox One (discontinued) | Android TV, Samsung, LG, Sony, Panasonic, Philips | Apple TV, Chromecast, Amazon Fire TV | Yes |
| Sky Go | Sky UK (Comcast) | United Kingdom; Ireland | Yes | Yes | Yes | No | Yes | Yes | PS3, PS4, PS5, Xbox 360, Xbox One, Xbox Series X/S | Android TV, Samsung, LG, Sony, Panasonic, Philips | Amazon Fire TV, Apple TV, Chromecast | No |
| STV Player | STV | United Kingdom | Yes | Yes | Yes | Yes | Yes | Yes | PS3 | Android TV | Amazon Fire TV, Apple TV, Chromecast, Now TV, Roku, Sky Glass, Virgin Media On Demand | Yes |
| TG4 Beo | TG4 | Ireland; Worldwide | Yes | No | No | No | No | No | None | Android TV | Amazon Fire TV, Roku, Apple TV, Chromecast | Yes |
| TBS | Skydance | United States | Yes | No | No | No | Yes | Yes | Xbox One, Xbox Series X/S | Android TV | Amazon Fire TV, Roku, Apple TV, Chromecast | Yes |
| The CW | The CW Network | United States | Yes | No | No | No | Yes | Yes | PS4, PS5, Xbox One, Xbox Series X/S | Android TV, Samsung, Vizio | Amazon Fire TV, Roku, Apple TV, Chromecast | Yes |
| Tivibu | Argela | Turkey | Yes | Yes | Yes | No | Yes | Yes | Pending | None | Ttnet on Demand | No |
| TVer | Nippon TV, TV Asahi, TBS Television, TV Tokyo, Fuji Television | Japan | Yes | No | No | No | Yes | Yes | PS5 | Android TV, Funai, Hisense, Iris Ohyama, LG, Panasonic, TVS Regza, Sharp, Sony, TCL | Amazon Fire TV, Chromecast, J:com Link, KDDI Cable-plus STB-2, au Hikari STA3000, Aladdin X | Yes |
| Virgin Media Play | Virgin Media Television Ireland | Ireland | Yes | No | No | No | Yes | Yes | None | Android TV | Amazon Fire TV, Roku, Apple TV, Chromecast | Yes |

== Livestreaming ==
=== Active services ===
- 17Live
- AcFun
- Bigo Live
- Bilibili
- Dailymotion
- DouYu
- DLive (owned by BitTorrent; 2017–)
- Facebook Live (owned by Meta Platforms; 2015–)
- Huya
- Instagram (owned by Meta Platforms)
- KakaoTV
- Kick (service)
- Kuaishou
- Likee
- LINE LIVE
- LinkedIn Live
- Livestream
- Naver TV
- Niconico
- On Air (streaming service)
- OK.ru
- OnlyFans
- Patreon
- Pixiv Sketch
- Rumble
- SHOWROOM
- SOOP
- Steam.tv
- TikTok/Douyin
- Triller
- Twitch (owned by Amazon; 2011–)
- X (Twitter)
- VK
- Youku
- YouNow (2011–)
- YouTube (owned by Alphabet Inc.'s Google; 2005–)
- YuppTV

=== Former services ===
- AnimeLab (2014–2021)
- Azubu (2012–2017)
- Boomerang (2015–2024)
- Caffeine (2018–2024)
- CaveTube (2011–2016 or 2017)
- Colon (2018–2019)
- Cube TV (2018–2019)
- Fan Live (2016–2018)
- Fresh Live (2016–2020)
- Hitbox (owned by Azubu; 2013–2017)
- Houseparty (2016–2021)
- Huomao (2014–2021)
- Justin.tv (owned by Twitch Interactive/Justin.tv, Inc; 2007–2014)
- KingKong (2018–2020)
- Meerkat (2015–2016)
- Mixer (owned by Microsoft; 2016–2020)
- Noggin (2015–2024)
- Panda.tv (2015–2019)
- Periscope (owned by Twitter, Inc.; 2015–2021)
- Play2Live (2017–2019)
- Quanmin.tv (2015–2018)
- Rabb.it (2014–2019)
- Smashcast (2017–2020)
- Stream.me (2015–2019)
- StreamCraft (2018–2019)
- V Live (owned by Naver Corporation; 2015–2022)
- Wakanim (2009–2023)
- Funimation (2016–2024)

== Overview of platforms and availability ==
| Service | Supporting company/companies | Regional availability | Website-based | Windows application | Mac application | Linux application | iOS application | Android application | Console application | TV set application | Set Top Box application | Free |
|---|---|---|---|---|---|---|---|---|---|---|---|---|
| APSFL IPTV | SAYT-TV2 | Andhra Pradesh, India | No | No | No | | No | APSFL Android Player | No | No | APSFL IPTV and video on Demand | Yes |
| BBC iPlayer | BBC | UK | Yes | Yes | Yes | Yes | Yes | Yes | Wii, PS3, PS4, PS5, Xbox 360, Xbox One, Xbox Series X/S | Android TV, Samsung, LG, Sony, Panasonic, Philips | Virgin Media On Demand, Freesat, Amazon Fire TV, Roku, Apple TV, Chromecast | Yes |
| Citytv | Citytv Rogers Communications Inc. | Canada | Yes. Website | | | | | | | | Amazon Fire TV, Roku, Apple TV, Chromecast | Yes. Free until February 5, 2024. |
| NBC | NBCUniversal (Comcast) | US | Yes | No | No | No | Yes | Yes | PS3, Xbox 360, Xbox One, Xbox Series X/S | Android TV, Samsung, Vizio | Amazon Fire TV, Roku, Apple TV, Chromecast | Yes |
| ABC | Walt Disney Television (The Walt Disney Company) | US | Yes | No | No | No | Yes | Yes | PS4, PS5, Xbox One, Xbox Series X/S | Android TV, Samsung, Vizio | Amazon Fire TV, Roku, Apple TV, Chromecast | Yes |
| FOX Now | Fox Corporation | US | Yes | No | No | No | Yes | Yes | PS4, PS5, Xbox One, Xbox Series X/S | Android TV, Samsung, Vizio | Amazon Fire TV, Roku, Apple TV, Chromecast | Yes |
| The CW | The CW Network | US | Yes | No | No | No | Yes | Yes | PS4, PS5, Xbox One, Xbox Series X/S | Android TV, Samsung, Vizio | Amazon Fire TV, Roku, Apple TV, Chromecast | Yes |
| CBS | Paramount Streaming (Paramount Skydance) | US | Yes | No | No | No | Yes | Yes | PS4, PS5, Xbox One, Xbox Series X/S | Android TV, Samsung, Vizio | Amazon Fire TV, Roku, Apple TV, Chromecast | Yes |
| Jio TV | LYF | India | No | No | No | No | Yes | Yes | No | No | Jio on Demand | Yes |
| Tivibu | Argela | Turkey | Yes | Yes | Yes | | Yes | Argela Android Player | Pending | None | Ttnet on Demand | No |
| Sky Go | Sky UK (Comcast) | UK & Ireland | Yes | Yes | Yes | | Yes | Yes | PS3, PS4, PS5, Xbox 360, Xbox One, Xbox Series X/S | Android TV, Samsung, LG, Sony, Panasonic, Philips | Amazon Fire TV, Apple TV, Chromecast | No |
| Eros Now | Eros | India | Yes | Yes | Yes | | Yes | Eros Android Player | No | Yes | Bollywood on Demand, Amazon Fire TV, Roku, Apple TV, Chromecast | Yes |
| ITVX | ITV | UK | Yes | Yes | Yes | Yes | Yes | Yes | PS3, PS4, PS5, Xbox 360, Xbox One, Xbox Series X/S | Android TV | Virgin Media On Demand, Amazon Fire TV, Roku, Apple TV, Chromecast | Yes |
| STV Player | STV | UK | Yes | Yes | Yes | Yes | Yes | Yes | PS3 | Android TV | Amazon Fire TV, Apple TV, Chromecast, Now TV, Roku, Sky Glass, Virgin Media On Demand | Yes |
| ABC iview | ABC | Australia | Yes | No | No | No | Yes | Yes | PS3, PS4, PS5, Xbox 360, Xbox One, Xbox Series X/S | Android TV, Samsung, LG, Sony, Panasonic, Philips | Apple TV, Chromecast, Amazon Fire TV | Yes |
| SBS On Demand | SBS | Australia | Yes | No | No | No | Yes | Yes | PS3, PS4, Xbox 360 | Android TV, Samsung, LG, Sony, Panasonic, Philips | Apple TV, Chromecast, Amazon Fire TV | Yes |
| 7plus | Seven West Media | Australia | Yes | No | No | No | Yes | Yes | PS4, PS5 | Android TV, Samsung, LG, Panasonic, Philips | Apple TV, Chromecast, Amazon Fire TV | Yes |
| 9Now | Nine Entertainment | Australia | Yes | No | No | No | Yes | Yes | PS4 | Android TV, Samsung, LG, Panasonic, Philips | Apple TV, Chromecast, Amazon Fire TV, Roku | Yes |
| 10Play | Paramount Networks UK & Australia (Paramount Skydance) | Australia | Yes | No | No | No | Yes | Yes | Xbox 360, Xbox One, Xbox Series X/S | Android TV, Samsung, LG, Panasonic, Philips | Apple TV, Chromecast, Amazon Fire TV | Yes |
| Foxtel Now | Foxtel | Australia | Yes | No | No | No | Yes | Yes | PS4 and PS5 | Android TV, Samsung, LG, Sony, Hisense | Apple TV and Chromecast | No |
| Channel 4 | Channel 4 | UK & Ireland | Yes | Yes | Yes | | Yes | Yes | PS3, PS4, PS5, Xbox 360, Xbox One, Xbox Series X/S | Android TV | Virgin Media On Demand, Amazon Fire TV, Roku, Apple TV, Chromecast | Yes |
| RTÉ Player | RTÉ | Ireland | Yes | | | | Yes | Yes | | Android TV | Apple TV and Chromecast | Yes |
| TG4 Beo | TG4 | Ireland and Worldwide/International | Yes | | | | | | | Android TV | Amazon Fire TV, Roku, Apple TV, Chromecast | Yes |
| Virgin Media Player | Virgin Media Ireland | Ireland | Yes | | | | Yes | Yes | | Android TV | Amazon Fire TV, Roku, Apple TV, Chromecast | Yes |
| Global Video | Global | Canada | Yes | | | | Yes | Yes | | Android TV | Amazon Fire TV, Roku, Apple TV, Chromecast | No |
| CBC Gem | CBC | Canada | Yes | | | | Yes | Yes | | Android TV | Amazon Fire TV, Roku, Apple TV, Chromecast | Yes |
| myTV | OSN, Rotana Group, SNA Corp | Americas, Australasia | No | Not yet | Not yet | No | Yes | Yes | Not yet | Samsung Smart TV, LG Smart TV, Google TV | Western Digital, Boxee Box, Netgear NTV 300, Google TV devices, Samsung and Android tablets | No |
| PTCL Smart TV App | PTCL | Pakistan | Yes | Yes | No | No | Yes | Yes | No | None | Standalone PTCL Smart Settop Box | No |
| 5 | 5, Paramount Skydance | UK | Yes | No | No | Yes | Yes | Yes | None | Samsung Smart TV, LG Smart TV, Google TV | Amazon Fire TV, Apple TV, Chromecast, Now TV, Roku, Sky Glass, Virgin Media On Demand | No |

== See also ==
- Direct-to-video
- Major film studios
- Live streaming
- Livestreamed news
- National Streaming Day
- Comparison of video hosting services
- List of online video platforms
- List of content platforms by monthly active users
