= Telephone numbers in Turkey =

- Country: Turkey
- Continent: Europe
- Numbering plan type: Closed
- NSN length: 10
- Format: +90 (xxx) xxx xx xx
- Country code: +90
- International access: 00
- Long-distance: 0

Telephone numbers in Turkey went from six (2+4) to seven digits (3+4) circa 1988. There used to be more than 5,000 local area codes of varying lengths (one to five digits) with correspondingly varying local number lengths.

The new system imposes three-digit area codes for provinces and seven digit local phone numbers. Istanbul is the only exception, having two different area codes (212 for the European side, and 216 for the Asian side).

The prefixes for the three major Turkish operators are as follows: Turkcell (530-539, 561 61, 516 16), Vodafone Turkey (540-549), and Türk Telekom (500-509 and 550-559).

On 30 August 1993, local numbers in most areas were changed in conjunction with a new numbering plan.

== Description ==
The country calling code of Turkey is 90.

- Language digit: (Note: In Turkish telephony (historically in PTT and Türk Telekom routing tables), the language digit determined which operator or announcement language the caller would hear) 0 (Direct Dialing)
- Language digit: 2 (Operator Assistance)
- National (significant) number: 10 digits
  - Area code: 3 digits
  - Local subscribers' number: 7 digits. (Note: Subscribers' numbers cannot be prefaced with the number 1. 1 is only to be used for certain special services.)
  - Only exceptions to this are call center numbers which start with 444, which cannot be dialed like area codes. They must be dialed with 7 digits from any phone in the country. The number format is 444 XX XX. To dial call center numbers from other countries, the number must be dialed as country code + call center number like 90 444 XX XX. If a caller dials a call center number including the area code, the IVR system instructs them to redial the number without the area code.
- Dialing procedure:
  - A call from another country would have the following dialing format:

International call prefix +	90 +	Area code +	Subscribers' number
(00) or +	90	(3 Digit)	(7 Digit)

Example: + 90 312 213 2965
International call prefix +	90 +	Area code +	Subscribers' number
+	90	312	213 2965

Access to automatic telephone service within Turkey:

trunk / inner - city code number: 0

Access to international telephone service from Turkey:

international code: 00

=== International Switched Digital Service ===
Ankara DMS-300

Istanbul DMS-300

İzmir DMS-300

Ankara, İstanbul and İzmir DMS-300 International Exchanges accept:

L/D + area code + subscriber number + ST

L/D = language digit: 0 (direct dialing)

L/D = language digit: 2 (operator assistance)

=== Operator access code ===
There are two international operator centers in Turkey, Ankara and İstanbul. Each one of these centers provides operator telephone services according to ITU-T dialing:

L/D + code11 + ST (random)

L/D + code12 + 312 + ST (Ankara)

L/D + code12 + 212 + ST (İstanbul)

L/D: language digit 2 English

C11: operator assistance

C12: international transits

ST: stop pulse

The operators of the international exchanges in Ankara and Istanbul are available under C11 and C12.

== List of area codes ==
Area Code	Province
212	Istanbul-I (European side)
216	Istanbul-II (Anatolian side)
222	Eskişehir
224	Bursa
226	Yalova
228	Bilecik
232	İzmir
236	Manisa
242	Antalya
246	Isparta
248	Burdur
252	Muğla
256	Aydın
258	Denizli
262	Kocaeli
264	Sakarya
266	Balıkesir
272	Afyonkarahisar
274	Kütahya
276	Uşak
282	Tekirdağ
284	Edirne
286	Çanakkale
288	Kırklareli
312	Ankara
318	Kırıkkale
322	Adana
324	Mersin
326	Hatay
328	Osmaniye
332	Konya
338	Karaman
342	Gaziantep
344	Kahramanmaraş
346	Sivas
348	Kilis
352	Kayseri
354	Yozgat
356	Tokat
358	Amasya
362	Samsun
364	Çorum
366	Kastamonu
368	Sinop
370	Karabük
372	Zonguldak
374	Bolu
376	Çankırı
378	Bartın
380	Düzce
382	Aksaray
384	Nevşehir
386	Kırşehir
388	Niğde
392	TRNC
412	Diyarbakır
414	Şanlıurfa
416	Adıyaman
422	Malatya
424	Elazığ
426	Bingöl
428	Tunceli
432	Van
434	Bitlis
436	Muş
438	Hakkâri
442	Erzurum
446	Erzincan
452	Ordu
454	Giresun
456	Gümüşhane
458	Bayburt
462	Trabzon
464	Rize
466	Artvin
472	Ağrı
474	Kars
476	Iğdır
478	Ardahan
482	Mardin
484	Siirt
486	Şırnak
488	Batman

== List of mobile codes ==
In use by	Prefixes
Türk Telekom	500 to 509; 551 to 559
Turkcell	530 to 539
Vodafone Turkey	540 to 549

(Note: These are the codes that wireless operators in Turkey assign to new subscribers. Because of mobile number portability, a subscriber's telephone number may not accurately reflect their actual operator.)

== List of other special domestic codes ==
In use by	Prefix(es)
Paging-I	512
NMT-I	522
GMPCS assigned to Globalstar	592
GSM-R numbers allocated to TCDD	594
Toll-free	800
Dial-up Internet access	822
Non-geographic	850
Pay-line (services other than those with special content and sexual content)	888
Pay-line (services with special content)	898
Pay-line (services with sexual content)	900
