= List of Turkey mobile virtual network operators =

Mobile virtual network operators (MVNOs) in Turkey lease wireless telephone and data spectrum from three major carriers Türk Telekom, Turkcell and Vodafone for resale.

== Active operators ==
Brand	Host network	Wireless technology			WiFi calling	MVNO type
Brand	Host network	2G	3G	4.5G	WiFi calling	MVNO type
61Cell	Turkcell	Yes	Yes	Yes	Unknown	Branded reseller
BİMcell	Türk Telekom	Yes	Yes	Yes	Unknown	Branded reseller
Bursa Mobile	Turkcell	Yes	Yes	Yes	Unknown	Branded reseller
Fenercell	Türk Telekom	Yes	Yes	Yes	Unknown	Branded reseller
Galatasaray Mobile	Türk Telekom	Yes	Yes	Yes	Unknown	Branded reseller
Pttcell	Türk Telekom	Yes	Yes	Yes	Unknown	Branded reseller
Teknosacell	Türk Telekom	Yes	Yes	Yes	Unknown	Branded reseller
Vestelcell	Türk Telekom	Yes	Yes	Yes	Unknown	Branded reseller

== Defunct and merged operators ==
Brand	Host network	Defunct date	MVNO Type	Notes
TTNET Mobil	Türk Telekom	Unknown	Service Provider	Was the first and the only MVNO that had the ability to set its tariffs independently from the retail prices set by the MNO. Then merged with Türk Telekom's mobile services.
Uğurcell	Türk Telekom	Unknown	Branded reseller	
KAFKAFcell	Türk Telekom	Unknown	Branded reseller	
Trabzoncell	Türk Telekom	21 September 2016	Branded reseller	The company has announced that they came to the end of the contract made with Türk Telekom. They also announced that they will continue their services under the network of Turkcell with the name of 61Cell.
Samsuncell	Türk Telekom	Unknown	Branded reseller	
Bursasporcell	Türk Telekom	Unknown	Branded reseller	
POCell	Türk Telekom	Unknown	Branded reseller	
Fix Kart	Telsim	Unknown	Branded reseller	
MyCep	Telsim	Unknown	Branded reseller	
Ox Kart	Telsim	Unknown	Branded reseller	
Pratik Hat	Telsim	Unknown	Branded reseller	
Star Cep	Telsim	Unknown	Branded reseller	
Muhabbet Kart	Turkcell	Unknown	Branded reseller	

== See also ==
- Mobile virtual network operator
- List of mobile network operators of Europe#Turkey
