= Telephone services in Turkey =

This article covers the telephone services in Turkey.

== Authority ==
The political authority overseeing telecommunications in Turkey is the Ministry of Transport, Maritime and Communication. Additionally, a supreme council, the Information and Communication Technologies Authority (abbreviated as BTK), regulates the internet and point-to-point telecommunications.

== Landline Telephony ==
Türk Telekom, a private company established from the state-owned PTT in 1995, is responsible for landline telephone services in Turkey. As of 2013, the number of landline subscribers was 15.2 million. The international dialing code for Turkey is +90.

== Mobile Telephony ==
Mobile phone services in Turkey are provided by three private companies: Turkcell, Vodafone Turkey, and Türk Telekom. As of 2024, Turkcell had 43.2 million subscribers, Vodafone had 25.4 million, and Türk Telekom had 26.2 million.

== International Satellite and Cable Connections ==
Turkey's national satellite operator, Türksat, manages the country's communication satellites under the "Turksat" brand. These satellites provide services such as broadcasting, internet, and data communications.

== Internet Service Providers ==
As of 2024, internet services in Turkey are provided by major operators including Türk Telekom, Turkcell Superonline, Vodafone, TurkNet, and Türksat, as well as smaller providers like Millenicom. Türk Telekom and Turkcell Superonline dominate with extensive fiber and broadband services, while Vodafone focuses on mobile internet. Türksat offers internet through its cable network.

Internet penetration in Turkey has reached over 80%, with approximately 68 million users. The country code for Turkish internet domains is ".tr".
