= Cem Uzan =

Turkish businessman and politician

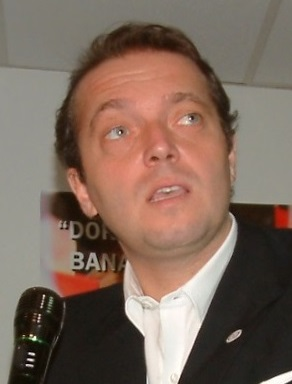

Cem Cengiz Uzan (born 26 December 1960, Istanbul) is a Turkish businessman and politician involved in the media and banking industries, while also chairing the social liberal Young Party (GENÇPARTİ). His family's media empire (Uzan Group) at one time included both television stations and print media. His family was one of Turkey's most influential families. His supporters claim Uzan's political rivalry resulted in the group's companies being seized by the government under Prime Minister Recep Tayyip Erdoğan, eventually resulting in Uzan's flight to France to escape what he claimed was political persecution. He has been sentenced in absentia to jail terms in the United Kingdom, United States and Turkey for fraud-related offences. Uzan attempted to buy three units of Trump World Tower, but he ultimately defaulted on the contract and lost an $8 million deposit.

Cem Uzan announced his intention to run for president in 2023 Turkish presidential election but his application for presidential candidacy was rejected by the Supreme Election Council (YSK) due to the reason of application were not made to the council in person.

== Early life ==
Cem Uzan was born in Istanbul on 26 December 1960, to businessmen Kemal Uzan and Melahat Uzan. He has two siblings named Ayşegül and Hakan Uzan. He completed high school at Deutsche Schule Istanbul and received his bachelor's degree in business administration from Pepperdine University in the US.

== Professional career ==
He founded many of the firsts on the Turkish media industry such as the first commercial TV channel 'Star TV', first entertainment TV channel 'Teleon TV', first music-oriented TV channel 'Kral TV', and first Turkish cinema and series channels 'Yeşilçam TV' and 'Dizi TV'; first commercial radio channel 'Süper FM', first arabesque music radio 'Kral FM', first foreign music radio 'Metro FM' and first slow music radio 'Joy FM'; as well as first digital media platform 'Star Digital'.

He also founded the telecommunication company Telsim which implemented many technological advances such as GPRS, MMS, WAP and Push to talk in Turkey as first and as well as one of the first ones worldwide.

The Star newspaper which he owned had the highest circulation in Turkey.

Uzan was also involved in soccer. He at one point owned İstanbulspor, transferring several star players into the team such as Sergen Yalçın, Aykut Kocaman, and Oğuz Çetin.

The concession agreements for Çukurova and Kepez Electric companies which were managed by the Uzan family, were cancelled in June 2003. On 3 July 2003, İmarbank and Adabank were seized. In February 2004, the Savings Deposit Insurance Fund (TMSF), took over the management of 219 companies owned by Uzans which many of them had precautionary measures in place as part of the İmarbank investigation.

In 2008, a lawsuit was filed against him for fraud and embezzlement within the scope of the İmarbank investigation. On 29 March 2013, the court ruled that Cem Uzan had fraudulently transferred a total of 1,468,240,378 TL belonging from the bank to himself and other Uzan family members to conceal the embezzlement. Uzan was sentenced to 18 years, 5 months and 20 days in prison, though his sentence was later reduced to 9 years and 2 months under execution law.

== Criticism ==
Uzan has often been criticized for using his professional life to bolster his political life, and even benefiting from criminal charges leveled against him. In 2003, U.S. District Court Judge Jed Rakoff commented, "I think the proof is very strong that the Uzans are business imperialists of the worst kind, in that they will go to any lengths, including fraud and racketeering, to preserve their business empire..." Cem Uzan responded by asserting that the judge "is biased against Turkey, against the Turkish people."

== Fraud and convictions ==
In December 2002, a U.K. court sentenced Cem Uzan to 15 months imprisonment for contempt of court after he failed to appear in the U.K. to testify in a case involving a $4.3billion defrauding of Motorola corporation.

In 2009, Motorola and Nokia won a $4.8 billion judgement against the Uzan family. The Uzans failed to show up in court and the judge ordered an arrest warrant for them should they enter the United States. In 2009, he fled to France claiming political asylum. The request was granted by the French government. He was later indicted of racketeering in Turkey.

After his flight to France, Uzan was sentenced in absentia in Turkey to twenty-three years in prison on 15 April 2010.
