= Murat Erkan =

Murat Erkan is a Turkish businessman who on 15 March 2019 became Turkcell's fifth CEO.

== Education ==
Erkan earned his undergraduate degree at Yıldız Technical University between 1986 and 1992, at the Department of Electronics and Telecommunication Engineering. In 2010, he attended the Strategic Marketing Management program at the Harvard Business School.

== Career ==
Murat Erkan, born in 1969, joined Turkcell Group in June 2008 as the General Manager of Turkcell Superonline, and in December 2015, he was appointed as the Executive Vice President of Sales. Mr. Erkan is the acting CEO effective March 15, 2019.

Mr. Erkan, who started his professional life at Toshiba, worked as an Application Engineer at Biltam Muhendislik and then served as the first “System Engineer” of Turkey at Cisco Turkey. He served as Chief Officer at Cisco Systems in charge of Technology, Sales, Business Development and Channel Management.

As from 2006, Mr. Erkan served as the Business Unit Manager at Aneltech responsible for solutions related to telecommunications, mobile, ICT, defense industry and industrial products sectors.

Murat Erkan graduated from the Yildiz Technical University Electronics and Telecommunication Engineering Department. He completed the Strategic Marketing Program at Harvard Business School in 2010.
