= Kuzey Kıbrıs Turkcell =

Mobile phone operator in Northern Cyprus

Kibris Mobile Telekomunikasyon Ltd.
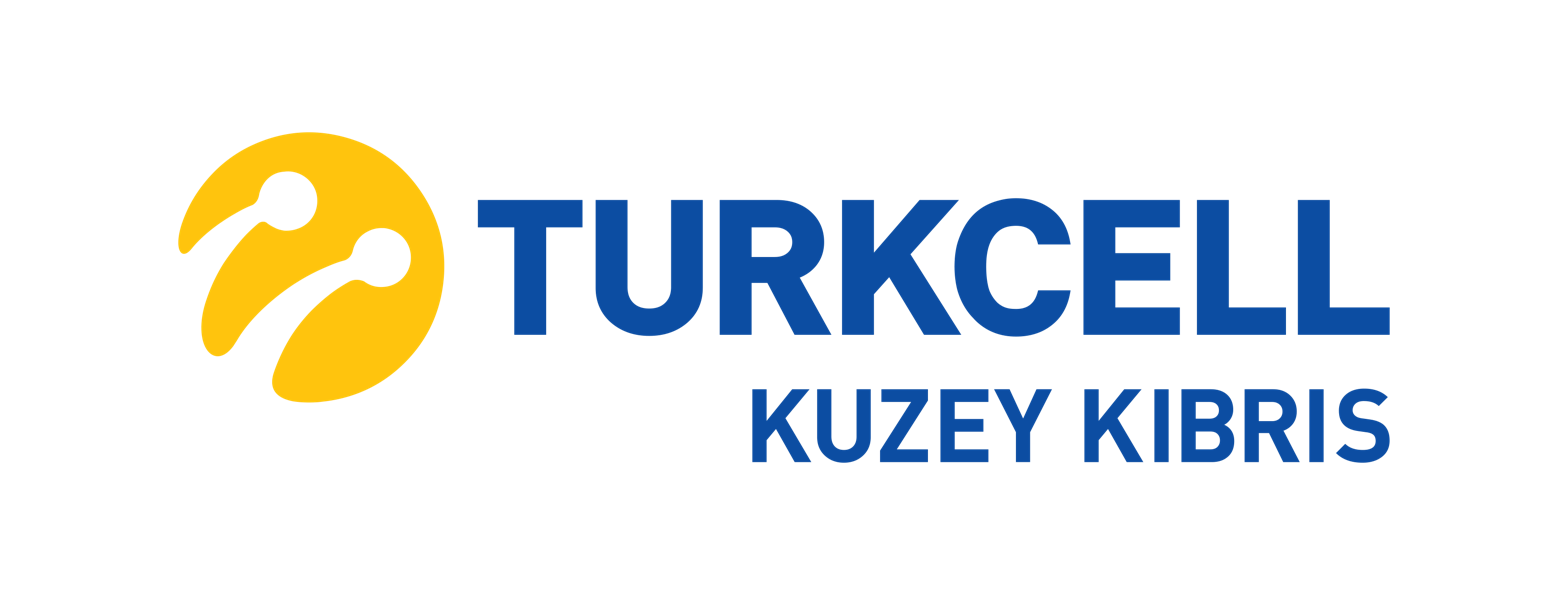
- 4th generation of Kuzey Kıbrıs Turkcell company logo
- Trade name: Kuzey Kıbrıs Turkcell
- Company type: Public
- Industry: Mobile Telecommunications
- Founded: 3 August 1999
- Headquarters: North Nicosia, Northern Cyprus
- Products: Mobile phone services,3G, mobile phone related goods
- Parent: Turkcell
- Website: www.kktcell.com

Kıbrıs Mobile Telekomünikasyon Ltd., doing business as Kuzey Kıbrıs Turkcell or KKTCELL is one of the two major mobile carriers in Northern Cyprus. A subsidiary of Turkcell, it was launched as the second provider in the country after KKTC Telsim on 28 July 1999. By March 2009, Kuzey Kıbrıs Turkcell had reached 318 thousand subscribers.

Kuzey Kıbrıs Turkcell subscribers have started to be able to use 3G (3rd Generation) technology in 2008, and 4G as of September 2023.

== Old logos ==
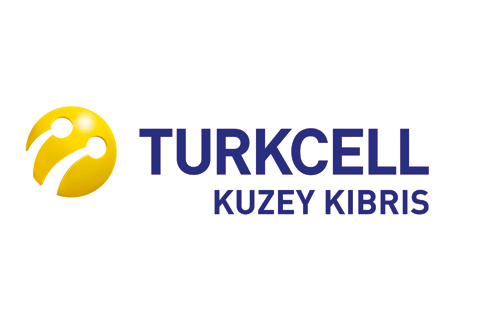
3rd generation of Kuzey Kıbrıs Turkcell company logo

== See also ==
- List of mobile network operators in Europe
