= Türk Telekom (mobile operator division) =

Avea İletişim Hizmetleri A.Ş.
- Avea logo (2004–2016)
- Native name: TT Mobil İletişim Hizmetleri A.Ş.
- Industry: Mobile telecommunications
- Predecessor: Aria (2001–2004); Aycell (2001–2004)
- Founded: February 19, 2004
- Defunct: January 27, 2016
- Successor: Türk Telekom (mobile services)
- Headquarters: Istanbul, Turkey
- Products: Mobile phone services, mobile phone related goods
- Parent: Türk Telekom
- Website: turktelekom.com.tr
- Footnotes; Name: The name AVEA comes from "Aycell VE Aria" meaning "Aycell and Aria".

TT Mobil İletişim Hizmetleri A.Ş., formerly Avea İletişim Hizmetleri A.Ş. (commonly Avea), is the mobile telecommunications arm of Türk Telekom in Turkey. Founded in 2004 through the merger of the mobile operators Aycell and Aria, it was one of Turkey's three nationwide GSM operators alongside Turkcell and Vodafone Turkey. It had reached a nationwide customer base of 17 million as of 30 September 2015. In January 2016 the Avea brand was retired and its services continue under the Türk Telekom brand.

== History ==
=== Predecessors: Aycell and Aria (2001–2004) ===
Aycell Haberleşme ve Pazarlama Hizmetleri A.Ş. was established as a subsidiary of Türk Telekom to operate a GSM 1800 mobile network, and began commercial operation in 2001.

İş-TİM Telekomünikasyon Hizmetleri A.Ş. was established through the partnership of İş Bankası Group, with a 51% share, and Telecom Italia Mobile, with a 49% share, and started operating under the brand Aria in 2001.

=== Merger and launch of the Avea brand (2004) ===
TT&TİM İletişim Hizmetleri A.Ş. was officially established on 19 February 2004 as a consequence of the merger between Aycell, Türk Telekom's GSM operator, and İş-TİM. Following the merger, the Aria and Aycell brands continued to exist for a period under TT&TİM. A new brand, "Avea", was introduced to the market on 23 June 2004. The business name "TT&TİM İletişim Hizmetleri A.Ş." was replaced with "Avea İletişim Hizmetleri A.Ş." on 15 October 2004.

=== Ownership changes (2005–2015) ===
The privatization of 55% of Türk Telekom's shares was completed in November 2005 by Oger Telecom, which changed the control of Avea's parent company.

In September 2006, Türk Telekom acquired Telecom Italia's 40.6% stake in Avea for US$500 million, raising its holding above 81%.

In July 2009, Avea launched 3G services.

In October 2014, Avea secured a US$400 million club loan from a consortium of banks. At that time Türk Telekom held approximately 89.99% of Avea and İş Bankası the remaining 10.01%. In April 2015, Türk Telekom reportedly bought İş Bankası's remaining 10% share, becoming the sole owner of the company.

=== 4.5G licence (2015) ===
In 2015, Avea took part in the spectrum auction held by the Information and Communication Technologies Authority (BTK) for IMT services, commonly called the 4.5G or LTE tender, in which the winning operators committed to pay a total of €3.96 billion.

=== Rebranding as Türk Telekom (2016) ===
On 27 January 2016, Türk Telekom started to use a single brand, "Türk Telekom", for its mobile networking, landlines and internet service provider. The announcement was made by the company's then chief executive Rami Aslan and covered both Avea and TTNET. 4.5G services began in Turkey on 1 April 2016. The company's current legal name is TT Mobil İletişim Hizmetleri A.Ş.

=== Infrastructure tender (2017) ===
In June 2017, Türk Telekom's mobile arm presented a US$450 million joint bid with Vodafone Turkey to provide mobile communications infrastructure in areas where such infrastructure was still lacking.

=== Türk Telekom Mobil today ===
In 2020 Türk Telekom Mobil carried out a refarming of 1800 MHz spectrum, moving 10 MHz from 2G to LTE and raising its LTE bandwidth in that band to 30 MHz. By the fourth quarter of 2024 Türk Telekom reported about 27.3 million mobile subscribers, with a BTK-reported market share of around 29%.

== Naming ==
Logo of Avea until 2016

"Avea" is a derived name from the names of the two merged operators, "Aycell" and "Aria". It is a combination of the first letters of the two names: "A" "ve" "A" in Turkish, meaning "A" "and" "A".

== Ownership ==
Date	Türk Telekom	Other shareholders	Notes
2004		Aycell and İş-TİM shareholders	Merger of Aycell and İş-TİM
September 2006	above 81%	İş Bankası	Acquisition of Telecom Italia's 40.6% stake for US$500 million
October 2014	≈89.99%	İş Bankası ≈10.01%	
April 2015	100%	—	İş Bankası's 10% stake bought

== Coverage area ==
The merging of two GSM operators resulted in the need to redesign the network architecture to extend coverage and to solve the issues created by the network load. Avea completed most of that process about one year after its creation and covered a vast majority of Turkey's land area with more than 7,000 base stations. Offering services to 97.4% of Turkey's population through its next-generation network, the company was growing fast in both corporate and individual services under the "Avea" brand and investing in technology and infrastructure, as well as in its management and more than 2,700 employees. Having roaming agreements with 656 operators in 201 countries, the company continued to expand its roaming partnerships.

Being a merger of two networks, Avea suffered from the heterogeneity of roaming partners and customers with numbers beginning with 50 and 55.

== Subscribers ==
Avea reported a customer base of more than 12.5 million at one point in its history, and 17 million as of 30 September 2015.

== See also ==
- List of companies of Turkey
- Turkcell
- Vodafone Turkey
- TTNET
