= Vargı =

Vargı is a surname. Notable people with the surname include:

- Murat Vargı (born 1947), Turkish billionaire businessman
- Ömer Vargı, Turkish film director and producer
