= Ahmet Akça =

Turkish businessman

Ahmet Akça is a Turkish entrepreneur, the chairman of the leading Turkish mobile network operator and technology company Turkcell and a philanthropist.
