= KKTC Telsim =

Vodafone subsidiary in Northern Cyprus

Vodafone Mobile Operations Ltd.
- Trade name: KKTC Telsim
- Company type: Public
- Industry: Mobile telecommunications
- Founded: August 1995
- Headquarters: North Nicosia, Northern Cyprus
- Products: Mobile phone services, mobile phone related goods
- Parent: Vodafone Turkey
- Website: kktctelsim.com

Vodafone Mobile Operations Ltd. or legally KKTC Telsim is the first GSM operator in Northern Cyprus. It was granted a licence in August 1995, and started service accepting subscribers on 23 October 1995.

The company was a subsidiary of Telsim Group in Turkey, part of the Uzan Group. When Telsim was taken over by the Vodafone Group on 23 August 2006, it became a subsidiary of the global Vodafone Group.

The company still operates under the brand KKTC Telsim in Northern Cyprus, although in Turkey Telsim has been rebranded Vodafone. This is due to Vodafone Group having a partnership agreement with the Cytamobile-Vodafone network in the Republic of Cyprus. The exclusive agreement on the use of the Vodafone brand name covers the entire territory claimed by Republic of Cyprus, thus including Northern Cyprus so the use of the Vodafone brand by a company other than Cytamobile is not allowed on the entire island.

KKTC Telsim also provides Vodafone TV service in North Cyprus.

== Subscribers ==
KKTC Telsim has 353,060 subscribers as 2022 Q2 and market share around 39%.

== See also ==
- List of mobile network operators of Europe
