= Türk Telekom =

Turkish telecommunications company

Türk Telekomünikasyon A.Ş.
- Type: Public; Anonim Şirket
- Traded as: BİST: TTKOM
- Industry: Telecommunications
- Founded: 23 October 1840; 186 years ago (as Postahane-i Amire); 24 April 1995; 31 years ago (as Türk Telekomünikasyon A.Ş.)
- Headquarters: Ankara, Turkey
- Key people: Ebubekir Şahin (CEO); Ömer Fatih Sayan (Chairman of the Board)
- Services: Fixed-line telephony, mobile telephony, broadband internet, digital television, Wi-Fi, cloud computing, information technology services
- Revenue: ▲ ₺ 100.2 billion (2023)
- Operating income: ▲ ₺ 33.5 billion (2023)
- Net income: ▲ ₺ 16.4 billion (2023)
- Total assets: ▲ ₺ 26,874 million (2016)
- Owner: Turkey Wealth Fund (60%); Ministry of Treasury and Finance (25%); Public float (15%)
- Number of employees: 33,224 (2016)
- Subsidiaries: Türk Telekom International; TTNET; Argela; Innova; AssisTT; Sebit; Pantel; Sobee Studios
- Website: www.turktelekom.com.tr

Türk Telekomünikasyon A.Ş. (lit. 'Turkish Telecommunications Inc.'), commonly known as Türk Telekom, is a state-controlled Turkish telecommunications company headquartered in Ankara. It was separated from the Turkish Post (PTT) on 24 April 1995 and today offers fixed-line telephony, broadband internet, mobile services, digital television and information technology solutions to individual and corporate customers across Turkey.

Türk Telekom Group provides integrated telecommunication services for PSTN, GSM and broadband internet. With a network infrastructure covering the whole country, the group's companies offer a wide range of services to personal and corporate customers. The group's subsidiaries include TTNET, Argela, Innova, Sebit and AssisTT, and the group historically owned the mobile operator Avea, one of Turkey's three GSM operators, which was rebranded under the Türk Telekom name in 2016. Türk Telekom also held an indirect stake in Albania's Albtelecom through CETEL.

As of the most recent ownership data published by the company, the Turkey Wealth Fund holds 60% of the shares and the Ministry of Treasury and Finance 25%, while the remaining 15% is offered to the public on Borsa Istanbul (BIST).

In 2018, in the course of the Turkish currency and debt crisis, Turkish and international banks took control of the company's majority stake due to billions of dollars in unpaid debt of its owner Oger Telekom. Creditors set up a special purpose vehicle to hold the stake while they tried to resolve what was described as Turkey's biggest-ever debt default. The stake was later acquired by the Turkey Wealth Fund (see History).

Between 2011 and 2021, the company was holding the naming rights to Ali Sami Yen Complex, home to the Galatasaray S.K.

== History ==
=== Origins and early telecommunications ===
The institutional roots of Türk Telekom go back to Postahane-i Amire, the Ottoman postal administration founded on 23 October 1840. After the founding of the Republic, postal, telegraph and telephone services were run by the state under the PTT organisation, which held a monopoly on fixed-line telecommunications for most of the 20th century.

Turkey met with GSM technology in 1994, when the system was first put into service for subscribers in Ankara, Istanbul, and İzmir.

=== Separation from PTT and early growth (1995–2004) ===
On 24 April 1995, the telecommunication and postal services of PTT were separated, leading to the foundation of Türk Telekomünikasyon A.Ş.

In April 1998, the GSM network was licensed for 25 years to the firms Turkcell and Vodafone Turkey (then Telsim). In June 1999, ADSL service was introduced to provide high-speed voice and image communication. Cable Internet applications began in 2000 on the existing cable TV infrastructure.

In January 2001, Aycell Haberleşme ve Pazarlama Hizmetleri A.Ş. was founded, followed by the start of operations by Iş-TIM Telekomünikasyon Services Inc. under the commercial name Aria in March 2001.

In February 2004, TT&TIM Communication Services Inc. was established through the merger of Türk Telekom's GSM operator Aycell and İŞ-TİM. Its commercial name was changed to Avea İletişim Hizmetleri A.Ş. in October 2004. In July 2004, Türksat A.Ş. was formed as a separate entity.

=== Privatization and public offering (2005–2008) ===
On 14 November 2005, Türk Telekom's privatization was completed, with 55% of its shares sold to Saudi Oger. On 15 September 2006, Türk Telekom acquired İŞ-TİM's 40.56% stake in Avea for US$500 million, increasing its ownership to 81.12%.

On 15 May 2008, an initial public offering of 15% of Türk Telekom shares was completed, and the shares began trading on the Istanbul Stock Exchange.

=== Mobile expansion and consolidation (2009–2017) ===
In July 2009, Avea launched 3G services. In September 2009, the group's companies had 16.8 million PSTN customers, 6 million ADSL customers and 12.1 million GSM customers. In October 2014, Avea secured a US$400 million club loan, and Türk Telekom held approximately 89.99% of the company at the time. In 2016, Avea was rebranded under the Türk Telekom name.

Türk Telekom's logo between 1995 and 2016

=== Debt crisis and change of control (2018–2022) ===
In July 2018, in the course of the Turkish currency and debt crisis, reports said that Turkish and international banks were poised to take control of Türk Telekom due to billions of dollars in unpaid debt. On 22 December 2018, Oger Telekom's creditors took control of Türk Telekom.

In March 2022, the Turkey Wealth Fund signed an agreement to purchase the 55% stake, regaining the shares previously held by Oger Telekom.

=== Recent developments (2023–present) ===
In 2023, the company reported revenue of ₺100.2 billion, operating income of ₺33.5 billion and net income of ₺16.4 billion.

== Operations ==
Türk Telekom operates Turkey's principal fixed-line network and provides PSTN voice service and broadband internet access through DSL and fibre technologies, in addition to mobile, digital television and corporate IT services.

== Subsidiaries ==
=== TTNET ===
TTNET is a Turkish Internet service provider. The 2013 annual report stated that TTNET had 6.3 million subscribers, 620,000 fiber subscribers, and 1.8 million TV subscribers.

It provides ADSL, dial-up, Wi-Fi, G.SHDSL, ATM, Frame Relay, and Metro Ethernet Internet access services to corporate and personal customers in 81 cities in Turkey. TTNET became the first Turkish company to be accepted into the United Nations' "Business Call to Action (BCtA)" program, which seeks to encourage companies to "develop inclusive business models that offer the potential for both commercial success and development impact", for its "Internet 4All initiative".

=== Innova IT Solutions ===
Innova Bilişim Çözümleri A.Ş. provides services to institutions in areas such as distribution, finance, and telecommunications. It includes the consultancy-design-application development-integration-maintenance value chain.

=== AssisTT ===
AssisTT is a customer service and call center company that also provides sales and marketing data. Türk Telekom holds a 100% interest in AssisTT, which was established in November 2007. As of the end of 2013, there were 115 million incoming calls (an 11% annual increase), which generated 360 million minutes of service time (a 13% annual increase).

AssisTT provides its services to other corporations and institutions in addition to its parent company Türk Telekom, and has been described as Turkey's largest call center.

=== Argela ===
Argela Software and Information Technologies sells technologies and services for telecom operators. The company started its activities in 2004 and is wholly owned by Türk Telekomünikasyon A.Ş.

=== Avea ===
Avea (Avea İletişim Hizmetleri A.Ş.) was a Turkish mobile operator founded in 2004 through the merger of Aycell and İŞ-TİM, and one of Turkey's three GSM operators together with Turkcell and Vodafone Turkey. It had a nationwide customer base of more than 12.5 million and offered services to 95.4% of Turkey's population through its network. Türk Telekom's ownership rose from 81.12% in 2006 to approximately 89.99% by 2014, with İşbank holding the remaining 10.01%. The company was rebranded as Türk Telekom in 2016.

=== Sebit ===
The activities of SEBIT Eğitim ve Bilgi Teknolojileri A.Ş. had started in 1988, in a multimedia laboratory founded within Turkey's Scientific and Technological Research Council (TÜBİTAK). The lab was privatized in 1996 and began producing computer-supported education content for K-12 level. After the product "Akademedia" produced in 1998, Educational software with the brand "Vitamin" was introduced. In the following years, "KidsPlus" products joined the series. The company has a presence in Chinese, Malaysian, American, and British markets.

It has been conducting the only integrated R&D project in the education area of the European Union's 6th Framework Program. Active in corporate education, it has developed e-learning solutions for institutions such as IES, Union of Banks of Turkey, Secretariat of Defense Industries, Public Procurement Agency, Coca-Cola, Migros, Siemens, and TTNET.

=== CETEL ===
CETEL was incorporated by Çalık Enerji and Türk Telekom having 80% and 20% shares, respectively, on 1 June 2007 as a special-purpose entity. CETEL purchased the 76% shares of Albtelecom on 1 October 2007. Albtelecom is the incumbent fixed-line operator in Albania, which also has a GSM license.

== Controversies ==
=== Spyware injection ===
Citizen Lab found that a series of middleboxes on Türk Telekom's network were being used to redirect hundreds of users attempting to download certain legitimate programs to versions of those programs bundled with spyware. The spyware Citizen Lab found bundled by operators was similar to that used in the StrongPity APT attacks. Before switching to the StrongPity spyware, the operators of the Turkey injection used the FinFisher "lawful intercept" spyware, which FinFisher asserts is sold only to government entities.

== See also ==
- Telephone services in Turkey
- Türk Telekom Stadium
- Türk Telekom (mobile operator division)
