= Metro FM (Turkey) =

- Istanbul; Turkey
- Frequency: See list

Programming
- Format: Music radio

Ownership
- Owner: Spectrum Medya
- Sister stations: Süper FM, Joy FM, Joy Türk

History
- First air date: 7 July 1992

Links
- Webcast: http://www.metrofm.com.tr/metrofmaac.asx
- Website: http://www.metrofm.com.tr/

Metro FM is a nationwide FM radio network broadcasting from Istanbul, Turkey.

It is one of the first privately founded radio stations in Turkey and the first foreign music station. Broadcasting Pop Music in languages other than Turkish, Metro FM can be listened to via terrestrial broadcast, Turksat 2A Satellite, BlackBerry and iPhone applications.

Founded by the private Uzan Group, Metro FM remained one of the media branches of the holding for over ten years. The station briefly stayed under government entity after the takeover of the Uzan Holding companies by government banking regulation agency TMSF. Following an auction held in September 2005, Metro FM was sold to the Canadian communication group Canwest for a sum of US$22,850,000. Failing its operations in Turkey as a result of the 2007 global recession, Canwest sold Metro FM along with its sister stations Süper FM, Joy FM and Joy Türk to Spectrum Medya, one of the domestic investment fund Actera Group’s companies. The name of the company has been changed to Karnaval Media.

Since its foundation in 1992, Metro FM has always been among the first two foreign music radio stations in the country in terms of rating. The station manager and program/music director is Cengiz Ünsal.

== Frequencies ==
- 97.2 Istanbul
- 97.2 Ankara
- 97.2 İzmir
- 96,0 Adana
- 102.6 Antalya
- 98.0 Alanya
- 93.5 Balıkesir
- 92.4 Bodrum
- 97.2 Bursa
- 97.2 Çeşme
- 95.2 Çorlu
- 96.0 Denizli
- 91.2 Diyarbakır
- 102.6 Edirne
- 97.2 Erzurum
- 97.2 Eskişehir
- 96.4 Fethiye
- 103.7 Gaziantep
- 103.3 Göcek
- 105.5 Mersin
- 98.9 Kayseri
- 95.6 Kocaeli
- 104.0 Köyceğiz
- 97.0 Malatya
- 96.1 Marmaris
- 103.1 Osmaniye
- 103.7 Şanlıurfa
- 91.2 Sakarya
- 99.1 Samsun
- 96.0 Tekirdağ
- 98.2 Trabzon
- 96.5 Zonguldak
