= List of programs broadcast by Sundance TV =

The following is a list of programs broadcast on Sundance TV and Sundance Now.

== Original programming ==
=== Drama ===
Title	Genre	Premiere	Seasons	Length	Status
Rectify	Drama	April 22, 2013	4 seasons, 30 episodes	43–68 min	Ended
The Red Road	Drama	February 27, 2014	2 seasons, 12 episodes	42–45 min	Ended
Hap and Leonard	Crime drama	March 2, 2016	3 seasons, 18 episodes	42–44 min	Ended
Sanctuary: A Witch's Tale (Note: SundanceNow exclusive)	Supernatural drama	January 4, 2024	2 seasons, 13 episodes	45–50 min	Pending

=== Comedy ===
Title	Genre	Premiere	Seasons	Length	Status
This Close	Comedy drama	February 14, 2018	2 seasons, 14 episodes	24–28 min	Ended
State of the Union	Comedy	May 6, 2019	2 seasons, 20 episodes	9–12 min	Ended

=== Unscripted ===
==== Docuseries ====
Title	Subject	Premiere	Seasons	Length	Status
Anatomy of a Scene	Filmmaking	2001	5 seasons, 37 episodes	30 min	Ended
Big Ideas for a Small Planet	Environmentalism	April 17, 2007	1 season, 13 episodes	25 min	Ended
Sin City Law	Crime/Government	September 10, 2007	1 season, 10 episodes	53–54 min	Ended
Brick City	Crime/Government	September 21, 2009	2 seasons, 11 episodes	45–52 min	Ended
Jonestown: Terror in the Jungle	True crime	November 17, 2018	4 episodes	43 min	Miniseries
No One Saw a Thing	True crime	August 1, 2019	1 season, 6 episodes	43 min	Ended
The Preppy Murder: Death in Central Park	True crime	November 13, 2019	5 episodes	43 min	Miniseries
True Crime Story: It Couldn't Happen Here	True crime	September 9, 2021	3 seasons, 20 episodes	42–43 min	Pending
True Crime Story: Indefensible	True crime	October 14, 2021	2 seasons, 12 episodes	20–21 min	Ended
True Crime Story: Look Into My Eyes	True crime	June 15, 2023	4 episodes	43–44 min	Miniseries
True Crime Story: Citizen Detective	True crime	October 12, 2023	6 episodes	43 min	Miniseries
True Crime Story: Smugshot	True crime	March 14, 2024	2 seasons, 12 episodes	43 min	Pending
The Tailor of Sin City	True crime	September 12, 2024	4 episodes	43 min	Miniseries
The Hunt for the Chameleon Killer	True crime	October 10, 2024	3 episodes	46–47 min	Miniseries
The Killer Clown: Murder at the Doorstep	True crime	June 5, 2025	3 episodes	45–46 min	Miniseries
Butchers of L.A.	True crime	June 26, 2025	3 episodes	45–46 min	Miniseries
The Furry Detectives: Unmasking a Monster	True crime	July 17, 2025	4 episodes	45–46 min	Miniseries
Wasp Woman: The Murder of a B-Movie Queen	True crime	October 2, 2025	3 episodes	44–47 min	Miniseries
The Idaho Murders: A College Town Nightmare	True crime	July 23, 2026	2 episodes	45–47 min	Miniseries
Hollywood Crime Story: The Mob Takes Over the Movies	True crime	August 13, 2026	3 episodes	48 min	Miniseries
Archive X: Unexplained Phenomena	Paranormal	October 1, 2026	1 season, 6 episodes	43 min	Pending

==== Reality ====
Title	Genre	Premiere	Seasons	Length	Status
Girls Who Like Boys Who Like Boys	Reality	December 7, 2010	2 seasons, 20 episodes	24 min	Ended
Push Girls	Reality	April 17, 2012	2 seasons, 24 episodes	19–24 min	Ended
Dream School	Reality	April 17, 2012	2 seasons, 10 episodes	24 min	Ended
Close Up with the Hollywood Reporter	Reality	August 2, 2015	6 seasons, 77 episodes	39–44 min	Ended

==== Variety ====
Title	Genre	Premiere	Seasons	Length	Status
Iconoclasts	Talk show	November 17, 2005	6 seasons, 36 episodes	45 min	Ended
The Mortified Sessions	Human interest	December 5, 2011	2 seasons, 12 episodes	23–26 min	Ended
The Writers' Room	Television	July 29, 2013	2 seasons, 12 episodes	21–22 min	Ended
Off Script with the Hollywood Reporter	Talk show	December 31, 2023	2 seasons, 15 episodes	39–44 min	Pending

=== Co-productions and third-party exclusive distribution ===
Title	Genre	Partner/Country	Premiere	Seasons	Length	Status
Top of the Lake	Drama	BBC Two/United Kingdom; BBC UKTV/Australia & New Zealand	March 18, 2013	2 seasons, 13 episodes	47–51 min	Ended
The Honourable Woman	Political spy thriller	BBC Two/United Kingdom	July 31, 2014	8 episodes	58–59 min	Miniseries
Deutschland 83	Spy thriller	RTL/Germany	June 17, 2015	1 season, 8 episodes	45–49 min	Ended
Cleverman	Science fiction supernatural drama	ABC/Australia	June 1, 2016	2 seasons, 12 episodes	48–51 min	Ended
The A Word	Drama	BBC One/United Kingdom	July 13, 2016	3 seasons, 18 episodes	57–59 min	Ended
Riviera	Drama	Sky Atlantic/United Kingdom	September 14, 2017	3 seasons, 28 episodes	40–50 min	Ended
Rosehaven	Comedy	ABC/Australia	September 27, 2017	5 seasons, 40 episodes	24–28 min	Ended
Liar	Thriller	ITV/United Kingdom	December 7, 2017	2 seasons, 12 episodes	43–45 min	Ended
The Split	Legal drama	BBC One/United Kingdom	May 28, 2018	2 seasons, 12 episodes	57–59 min	Ended (Note: Moved to BBC America for final season)
Deutschland 86	Spy thriller	Amazon Prime Video/Germany	October 25, 2018	1 season, 10 episodes	43–47 min	Ended
The Name of the Rose	Period drama	Rai 1/Italy	May 23, 2019	8 episodes	46–52 min	Miniseries
The Oslo Killing	True crime docuseries	Viaplay/Norway	June 4, 2019	1 season, 6 episodes	41–44 min	Ended
The Cry	Mystery drama	BBC One/United Kingdom; ABC/Australia	October 23, 2019	4 episodes	56–59 min	Miniseries
The Gulf	Crime drama	Three/New Zealand; ZDF/Germany	December 4, 2019	2 seasons, 14 episodes	41–52 min	Ended
Wisting	Crime drama	Viaplay/Norway	December 18, 2019	3 seasons, 18 episodes	42–47 min	Ended
Blinded	Crime drama	TV4/Sweden	July 2, 2020	3 seasons, 22 episodes	43–44 min	Ended
Deutschland 89	Spy thriller	Amazon Prime Video/Germany	October 29, 2020	8 episodes	49–52 min	Miniseries
The Pact	Drama anthology	BBC One/United Kingdom	December 2, 2021	2 seasons, 12 episodes	55–60 min	Ended
The Suspect	Police procedural	ITV/United Kingdom	August 28, 2022	1 season, 5 episodes	46–49 min	Ended
Black Snow	Crime drama	Stan/Australia	February 23, 2023	2 seasons, 12 episodes	49–52 min	Renewed
Totally Completely Fine	Dark comedy	Stan/Australia	April 20, 2023	1 season, 6 episodes	46–50 min	Ended
Clean Sweep	Thriller	RTÉ/Ireland	June 22, 2023	6 episodes	46–52 min	Miniseries
Wrongly Accused	True crime docuseries	CBS Reality/United Kingdom	August 3, 2023	1 season, 10 episodes	47 min	Ended
The Vanishing Triangle	Drama	Virgin Media Television/Ireland	September 28, 2023	6 episodes	42–44 min	Miniseries
The Lovers	Romantic comedy	Sky Atlantic/United Kingdom	December 7, 2023	1 season, 6 episodes	24–31 min	Ended
Far North	Comedy drama crime caper	TV3/New Zealand	February 15, 2024	6 episodes	48–52 min	Miniseries
The Long Shadow	True crime drama	ITV1/United Kingdom	March 21, 2024	7 episodes	48–50 min	Miniseries
Scrublands	Thriller	Stan/Australia	May 2, 2024	2 seasons, 8 episodes	36–40 min	Renewed
Domino Day	Supernatural drama	BBC Three/United Kingdom	June 27, 2024	1 season, 6 episodes	42–45 min	Ended
Fifteen-Love	Sports drama	Amazon Prime Video/United Kingdom	August 22, 2024	1 season, 6 episodes	48–52 min	Ended
White Lies	Crime thriller	M-Net/South Africa	December 5, 2024	8 episodes	44–52 min	Miniseries
The Newsreader	Historical drama	ABC/Australia	December 12, 2024	2 seasons, 12 episodes	54–57 min	Pending
Fallen	Supernatural thriller	Globoplay/Brazil	February 6, 2025	1 season, 8 episodes	45–53 min	Ended
The Last Anniversary	Mystery drama	Binge/Australia	March 30, 2025	6 episodes	40–55 min	Miniseries
Kidnapped: The Chloe Ayling Story	Crime thriller	BBC Three/United Kingdom	August 28, 2025	6 episodes	27–29 min	Miniseries
The Basement: A Vanishing in Apple Valley	True crime docuseries	5/United Kingdom	November 6, 2025	2 episodes	45 min	Miniseries

== Acquired programming ==
=== Current ===
- The A-Team
- The Andy Griffith Show
- Blue Bloods
- Columbo
- Gilligan's Island
- Law & Order
- Magnum, P.I.
- Monk
- NCIS
- Night Court
- Perry Mason
- Rizzoli & Isles
- Sanford and Son
- S.W.A.T.

=== Former ===
- All in the Family
- Back
- Barney Miller
- Blue Planet II
- The Bob Newhart Show
- Breaking Bad
- Burn Notice
- Criminal Minds
- Dynasties
- Gomer Pyle, U.S.M.C.
- Gomorrah
- The Great Christmas Light Fight
- Hogan's Heroes
- JAG
- Kath & Kim
- Law & Order: Criminal Intent
- Mama's Family
- The Mary Tyler Moore Show
- M*A*S*H
- My So-Called Life
- Orphan Black
- The Returned
- Roots
- Saved by the Bell
- Seven Worlds, One Planet
- Transparent
