= List of Discovery+ original programming =

Discovery+ is a streaming service owned and operated by Warner Bros. Discovery, which features a catalog of programming from Warner Bros. Discovery's factual networks. The service also streams programming from the BBC and A&E Networks. It was first launched in India on March 23, 2020.

== Original programming ==
=== Documentary ===
Title	Genre	Premiere
Auto Biography	Driving	January 4, 2021
Pig Royalty		March 23, 2021
Destination Fear	Psychological horror	January 4, 2021
Undercover Underage	True crime	November 2, 2021

=== Drama ===
Title	Genre	Premiere
American Detective with Joe Kenda	Crime drama	January 4, 2021
Amityville Horror House	Horror	January 4, 2021
UFO Witness	Science fiction	January 14, 2021

=== Reality ===
Title	Genre	Premiere
90 Day Bares All	Aftershow	January 4, 2021
90 Day Diaries		January 4, 2021
90 Day Journey		January 4, 2021
Amy Schumer Learns to Cook: Uncensored		January 4, 2021
BattleBots: Bounty Hunters		January 4, 2021
Bobby and Giada in Italy	Cooking show	January 4, 2021
Cakealikes	Cooking show	January 4, 2021
Chopped Challenge		January 4, 2021
Christina: Stronger By Design	Home improvement	January 4, 2021
Dr. Pimple Popper: This is Zit		January 4, 2021
Elephant Hospital		January 4, 2021
Family Dinner		January 4, 2021
The Fieldhouse		January 4, 2021
First Time Fixer		January 4, 2021
Fixer Upper: Welcome Home		January 4, 2021
Frozen in Time	Home improvement	January 4, 2021
Ghost Adventures: Cecil Hotel		January 4, 2021
Ghost Adventures: Top 10		January 4, 2021
Gold Rush: Freddy Dodge's Mine Rescue		January 4, 2021
Growing Floret		January 4, 2021
HGTV's House Party		January 4, 2021
Home on the Road with Johnnyswim		January 4, 2021
Home Town: Ben's Workshop		January 4, 2021
House Hunters: Comedians on Couches Unfiltered		January 4, 2021
The Lost Kitchen		January 4, 2021
Lovely Bites with Chef Lovely		January 4, 2021
Luda Can't Cook	Cooking show	January 4, 2021
Magnolia Table with Joanna Gaines	Cooking show	January 4, 2021
Martha Gets Down and Dirty	Lifestyle	January 4, 2021
Monster Garage		January 4, 2021
Mysterious Planet	Nature documentary	January 4, 2021
Onision: In Real Life		January 4, 2021
The Other Way Strikes Back!		January 4, 2021
Point of View: A Designer Profile		January 4, 2021
Prisoner of Love		January 4, 2021
Race Across the World		January 4, 2021
Restoration Road with Clint Harp		January 4, 2021
Road to Launch		January 4, 2021
Say Yes to the Dress: In Sickness and In Health	Fashion design	January 4, 2021
Self Employed		January 4, 2021
Six Degrees with Mike Rowe	History	January 4, 2021
Super Dad		January 4, 2021
Tarek's Flip Side	Home improvement	January 4, 2021
Tregaye's Way in the Kitchen		January 4, 2021
Toddlers & Tiaras: Where Are They Now?		January 21, 2021
Undercover Billionaire: Comeback City		January 7, 2021
Design Star: Next Gen		February 24, 2021
The Laundry Guy		March 31, 2021
Queen of Meth	True crime	May 7, 2021
90 Day: Foody Call		May 29, 2021
Clipped		May 12, 2021
Duff's Happy Fun Bake Time		April 29, 2021
Richard Hammond's Workshop		October 18, 2021
Foodgod		November 14, 2021
Alaskan Killer Bigfoot		December 7, 2021
Trixie Motel	Renovation	June 3, 2022

=== Indian originals ===
Title	Genre	Premiere
Ladakh Warriors: The Sons of the Soil	War history	December 9, 2020
Mission Frontline with Rana Daggubati	Military adventure	January 21, 2021
Secrets of Sinauli	Civilization history	February 9, 2021
Vande Bharat Flight IX1344	Disaster	March 6, 2021
Star V Food	Cooking	April 15, 2021
