= Uzan Group =

Turkish conglomerate

Uzan Group was a Turkish conglomerate owned by Cem Uzan. The group formerly owned (via the Star Media Group) Star TV, which it had founded as the first private broadcaster in the country, Metro FM, and the Star newspaper it launched in 1999. Other group companies included the Telsim mobile network and Imar Bank. In 2003 the Turkish government seized 219 group companies to cover $5.7 billion of debts arising from bank fraud at Imar.

Uzan Group's ÇEAŞ and Kepez companies were seized by the Turkish government in 2003. A Cypriot company controlled by the Uzan family, Libananco, sued the Turkish government for $10 billion in damages, but lost the case in front of the International Centre for Settlement of Investment Disputes trade panel.
