= Showroom (service) =

Japanese live streaming service

- Website type: Live streaming
- Owners: Showroom Co., Ltd.
- Creator: Yuji Maeda
- Parent: DeNAYuji Maeda
- Commercial: Yes
- Registration: Optional
- Launched: November 25, 2013; 12 years ago
- Current status: Online

Showroom (stylized in all caps) is a Japanese live streaming service used primarily for Japanese idols and voice actors. A development of DeNA, it has been integrated into the audition process for idol groups such as 22/7, Nogizaka46, and Keyakizaka46.

App analytics company App Annie announced on September 13, 2017, that for the first half of 2017, in terms of revenue, Showroom is Japan's top-ranked video distribution application.

== Events ==
The service is used for daily live-streams, which may be viewed for free. As of March 2018, there are no paid or subscription-based memberships. Revenue is generated from paid virtual gift items given to the performer by registered members during live-streams. Earnings are shared with the performers based upon the number of points they accumulate based on audience size, the number of comments, and other factors, and production companies may offer licensing deals or other music offers.

Initially, it only allowed streaming by the DeNA headquarters studio and by officially-recognized entertainers. After September 13, 2014, any registered member could live-stream. English language support was also added.

== History ==
- November 25, 2013 – Browser-based service initiated by DeNA Corporation
- December 20, 2013 – Android app launched
- January 14, 2014 – iOS app launched
- September 13, 2014 – All registered members are allowed to live-stream, English support added.
- April 1, 2015 – Released the iOS version of "Showroom Producer"
- August 3, 2015 – DeNA Corporation spins off Showroom Co., Ltd. to operate the service.
- October 22, 2020 – Launched Smash, a video streaming app.
