= List of Mango TV original programming =

Mango TV is a streaming platform owned by HBS.

== Original drama ==
Title	Genre	Premiere	Seasons	Length	Status
Gank Your Heart (Chinese: 陪你到世界之巅)	Romance	June 9, 2019	35 episodes	40 min.	Ended
Love of Thousand Years (Chinese: 三千鸦杀) (Note: Co-distributed with Youku)	Romance	March 19, 2020	30 episodes	42 - 45 min.	Ended
Beautiful Time With You (Chinese: 时光与你都很甜)	Romance	February 14, 2020	32 episodes	28 - 34 min.	Ended
Guardians of the Ancient Oath (Chinese: 上古密约)	Fantasy	February 9, 2020	45 episodes	35 - 45 min.	Ended
Love Unexpected (Chinese: 不可思议的爱情)	Romance	January 31, 2021	25 episodes	40 - 43 min.	Ended
I Don't Want To Be Friends With You (Chinese: 我才不要和你做朋友呢)	Romance	May 19, 2020	24 episodes	42 - 53 min.	Ended
Intense Love (Chinese: 韫色过浓)	Romance	May 2, 2020	24 episodes	36 episodes	Ended
Girlfriend (Chinese: 楼下女友请签收)	Romance	April 5, 2020	36 episodes	33 min.	Ended
Well-Dominated Love (Chinese: 奈何BOSS又如何)	Romance	June 10, 2020	24 episodes	46 - 53 min.	Ended
Great Escape Season 2 (Chinese: 密室大逃脱 第二季)	Mystery	June 20, 2020	13 episodes	1 hr. 25 min.	Ended
Perfect and Casual (Chinese: 完美先生和差不多小姐)	Romance	September 28, 2020	24 episodes	45 min.	Ended
Begin Again (Chinese: 从结婚开始恋爱)	Comedy	October 29, 2020	35 episodes	45 min.	Ended
Killer and Healer (Chinese: 恨君不似江楼月)	Crime thriller	March 3, 2021	37 episodes	40 min.	Ended
Don't Disturb My Study (Chinese: 别想打扰我学习)	Comedy	March 10, 2021	24 episodes	45 min.	Ended
Unforgettable Love (Chinese: 贺先生的恋恋不忘)	Romance	July 10, 2021	24 episodes	45 min.	Ended
Remembrance of Things Past (Chinese: 我在他乡挺好的)	Romance	July 19, 2021	12 episodes	1 hr. 15 min.	Ended

=== Short ===
Title	Genre	Premiere	Seasons	Length	Status
Study together (Chinese: 一起学习吧)	Teen drama	February 1, 2021	26 episodes	11 min.	Ended
Dim Light In the Shadow (Chinese: 那年夏天的秘密)	Teen drama	January 2, 2020	16 episodes	10 - 15 min.	Ended
A Family Stranger (Chinese: 虚颜)	Historical	September 23, 2022	18 episodes	10 min.	Ended

== Distribution ==
Title	Genre	Original network/co-distribution	Premiere	Seasons	Length	Status
The Blessed Girl (Chinese: 玲珑)	Romance	Tencent video original series	January 29, 2021	40 episodes	42 - 49 min.	Ended
Unrequited Love（Chinese: 暗恋橘生淮南）	Romance		January 20, 2021	38 episodes	45 min.	Ended
Shuke and Peach Blossom (Chinese: 舒克与桃花)	Romance		January 1, 2021	40 episodes	40 min.	Ended
Basket Loveball (Chinese: 夏夜知君暖)	Romance		June 12, 2020	24 episodes	34 - 39 min.	Ended
Love And The Emperor (Chinese: 手可摘星辰)	Romance	Mango exclusive acquisition	March 4, 2020	24 episodes	28 - 45 min.	Ended
Forget You Remember Love (Chinese: 忘记你，记得爱情)	Romance	Tencent video original series	March 23, 2020	38 episodes	41 - 47 min.	Ended
Legend of Awakening (Chinese: 天醒之路)	Wuxia	Co-distributed with iQIYI	April 23, 2020	48 episodes	45 - 47 min.	Ended
The Chang'an Youth (Chinese: 长安少年行)	Romance	Tencent video original series	April 20, 2020	24 episodes	43 - 47 min.	Ended
Fake Princess (Chinese: 山寨小萌主)	Romance	Mango exclusive acquisition	May 17, 2020	27 episodes	38 - 51 min.	Ended
Go Ahead (Chinese: 以家人之名)	Drama	Co-distributed with Hunan TV	August 10, 2020	46 episodes	35 min.	Ended
Our Secret (Chinese: 暗格里的秘密)	Romance	Co-distributed with iQIYI	August 10, 2021	24 episodes	45 min.	Ended
Young Blood (Chinese: 大宋少年志)	Romance	Co-distributed with Hunan TV	June 3, 2019	42 episodes	45 min.	Ended

== Variety ==
Title	Genre	Premiere	Seasons	Length	Status
Listen to me (Chinese: 听姐说)	Reality	March 28, 2021	12 episodes	1 hour 23 - 58 min.	Ended
Workplace Newcomers (Chinese: 初入职场的我们)	Reality	April 6, 2021	12 episodes	1 hour 35 - 41 min.	Ended
Xúnzhǎo yānhuǒ lǐ de shēngyīn (Chinese: 寻找烟火里的声音)	Reality	May 17, 2021	12 episodes	15 - 36 min.	Ended
Boom! Heart (Chinese: 扑通扑通的心)	Reality	June 21, 2021	12 episodes	1 hour 14 - 18 min.	Ended
See You Again (Chinese: 再见爱人)	Reality	July 28, 2021	13 episodes	1 hour 10 - 2 hour 8 min.	Ended
Call Me By Fire (Chinese: 披荆斩棘的哥哥)	Music reality	August 12, 2021	12 episodes	1 hour 21 - 4 hour 18 min.	Ended
Wǒ de jiāxiāng hǎoměi (Chinese: 我的家乡好美)	Reality	November 1, 2021	Updating	50 min.	Ongoing
Zuò péngyǒu yě méiguānxì (Chinese: 做朋友也没关系)	Reality	November 2 2021	13 episodes	40 min.	Ended
Night in the Greater Bay (Chinese: 大湾仔的夜)	Reality	November 17, 2021	Updating	1 hour 24 - 49 min.	Ongoing
Brave Life (Chinese: 我们的滚烫人生)	Reality	December 10, 2021	Updating	1 hour 36 min.	Ongoing
FaFa Store (Chinese: 马栏花花便利店)	Reality	December 21, 2021	Updating	38 min.	Ongoing
Show It All	Reality	March 25, 2024	Updating	52 min - 1 hour 30 min.	Ongoing
