= Houseparty (app) =

Defunct social networking app

- Original author: Ben Rubin
- Developer: Life on Air Inc. (Epic Games)
- Release: February 2016; 10 years ago - October 2021; 5 years ago
- Operating system: iOS, Android, macOS
- Predecessor: Meerkat
- Available in: English
- Type: Video streaming, social networking service
- Website: www.houseparty.com

Houseparty was a social networking service developed by Life On Air, Inc. and launched in 2016. Sima Sistani was the company's chief executive officer and co-founder. The platform allowed users to join spontaneous video conversations with friends and became known for notifying users when their contacts were online. The service was available through mobile and desktop apps.

In 2019, the company was acquired by Epic Games.

== History ==
In early 2015, Life On Air, Inc., a team headed by founder and CEO Ben Rubin, released the live streaming app Meerkat and raised $12 million in venture capital funding from Greylock Partners. Following the release, the creators began developing a new app called Houseparty that moved "away from public broadcasts in favor of private chats."

Houseparty was released to the App Store and Play Store in February 2016 under a pseudonym. It was developed over 10 months with a website redirecting to the Houseparty app in October 2016. The company raised $52 million in venture capital funding from Sequoia Capital in late 2016. It was made available on macOS in 2018, and later became available on iOS, Android mobile devices, and Google Chrome.

=== Epic Games acquisition ===
Co-founder Sistani was announced as the company's chief executive officer in March 2019 and led the acquisition of Houseparty by Epic Games later that year. Life on Air, Inc. became a subsidiary of Epic Games and the monetary terms of the acquisition were not disclosed.Sistani noted that Houseparty was being used by Fortnite players, so "the partnership made a lot of sense."

In May 2020, Houseparty announced "In The House", a three-day festival with live at-home performances by celebrities such as Alicia Keys, Dion Dublin, Neil Patrick Harris, Zooey Deschanel and Terry Crews.

On September 9, 2021, Epic Games announced that they were planning to shut down the Houseparty service in October of the same year, having announced that the app was to be delisted immediately from mobile app stores. Both the main video chatting service and the app's "Fortnite Mode" which integrated the app's video chat into Fortnite Battle Royale which was introduced in November 2020, were to function as usual until the service's discontinuation.

== Technology ==
Houseparty was a "face-to-face social network" where up to eight participants could interact in a single session. Users would receive a notification when friends are online and available to group video chat or float between chat rooms. On average, users spent more than 60 minutes per conversation on the app in group or one-on-one chats.

During early 2019, the company partnered with Ellen DeGeneres's app, "Heads Up!", which is similar to charades. In the summer of 2020, Houseparty partnered with Mattel to add Magic 8 Ball and the card game Uno to the app. The app contains other popular games such as Quick Draw, Chips & Guac and trivia games that can be played with friends in a video chat.

It has been called the "virtual living room" of apps by The New Yorker.

== Usage during COVID-19 pandemic ==
As many countries went into lockdown during the beginning of the COVID-19 pandemic in early 2020, the app experienced a large increase in popularity. It was downloaded more than 17 million times in March 2020, winning a 2020 Webby Award for "Breakout of the Year". In late March 2020, media outlets reported that Houseparty had been hacked. The report was denied by CEO Sistani stating that "if anyone wanted to know whether we had been hacked, it would be us." According to Fast Company, the app ranked first in Social Networking on the iOS App Store with 50 million downloads through April 2020.
