= TTNET =

TTNET A.Ş.
- Company type: Public, subsidiary of Türk Telekom
- Industry: Telecommunication; Internet service provider Digital television
- Founded: 26 April 2006
- Defunct: 26 January 2016
- Headquarters: Istanbul, Turkey
- Website: TTNET

TTNET A.Ş., operating under the Türk Telekom brand, is the largest Internet service provider in Turkey and has around 7 million subscribers. TTNET is a subsidiary of Türk Telekom Group.

Currently, Mohammad Hariri is Chairman of the Board of Directors and Abdullah Orkun KAYA is the CEO of the TTNET.

In February 2010, TTNET launched a new service called Tivibu, which combines television and cinema. This service allows users to access both television and a library of movies via both mobile phones and computers.

On 26 January 2016, Türk Telekom decided to use single brand "Türk Telekom", for its mobile networking, landlines and Internet service provider.

== Brands ==
Tivibu is an Internet television service that is provided by TTNET. This service offers television and cinema experiences to the users in Turkey through its high-speed broadband service. WebTV does not require the user to have a fixed location or a set-top-box. The software and the middleware for Tivibu, have been developed by Argela.

TTNET Wifi is a wireless internet connection service of TTNET. It is available on 7500 service points. TTNET Wi-Fi service also offers abroad access service through TTNET and iPass Inc. collaboration.

TTNET Müzik is a service enabling 6M+ ADSL subscribers of TTNET to download and stream music freely on the Internet. The project includes all Turkish and foreign music libraries as long as the user uses TTNET ADSL as a service provider. It was replaced by Muud.

TTNET Aile Koruma Şifresi is a content restriction program designed to filter out objectionable sites for children. Introduced in November 2007. A maximum of 2 licenses can be created per TTNET ADSL subscriber and you can download TTNET Aile Koruma Şifresi from your computer and enter the license key to install it. The original of this program is ContentWatch.

TTNET Video is a defunct video streaming site. TTNET Video was founded in 2008 and its video service was discontinued in December 2009. We need a TTNET ADSL subscriber to upload the video. It was replaced by Tivibu.

TTNET 3G is a service that offers mobile internet with 3G technology in several places in addition to coverage area of TTNET WiFi service points.

TTNET Güvenlik is a service of TTNET to protect computers from viruses and malware with TTNET GÜVENLİK McAfee Internet Security.

TTNET Oyun is a game site exclusive to TTNET subscribers. TTNET Oyun was established in 2009. In the early days, it included games with Flash plugins and a web browser was required on the computer to play the game. It was replaced by TT Play Store.

NETDİSK was a service of TTNET for cloud storage that gave 20GB free to all TTNET subscribers.

=== Special campaign ===
TTNET Bil Bil Kazan is a Facebook campaign-based quiz application. The campaign was launched on 1 December 2009 and ended on 28 February 2010. To participate in the campaign, a Facebook account, a TTNET ADSL subscriber and a person over the age of 18 is required. In the quiz, points will be earned by correctly answering questions about culture, history, music, cinema, literature, sports and other categories related to TTNET. In the quiz where each question is scored according to its difficulty level, the 10 people who get the most points each day will win a 49 TL hepsiburada.com gift certificate and will have the chance to win one of 1 Mini Cooper Hatchback, 5 Sony Full HD LCD TV, 5 HP Pavilion Notebook and 10 iPod Nano 16 GB Black by participating in the draw to be held at the end of 3 months. The winners were announced on the www.ttnetbilbilkazan.com.tr website and in the Posta newspaper on 11 March 2010.
