= Smash (app) =

Japanese mobile streaming app

smash.
- Developer(s): Showroom Co., Ltd.
- Initial release: October 22, 2020
- Operating system: iOS, Android
- Website: smash-media.jp

Smash (stylized as smash.) is a Japanese video on demand mobile application. It offers original content such as music, dramas, animated series, and variety shows, all in vertical video format optimized for viewing on smartphones. It is notable for featuring exclusive content from popular Japanese and Korean pop groups, such as the AKB48 Group, the Sakamichi Series, Hey! Say! JUMP and BTS. It is officially available for use in Japan, the United States, and South Korea. Its major shareholders include the Korean entertainment company Hybe.

As of October 2021, the app has over 1.63 million downloads.

== See also ==
- Showroom (streaming service)
