= Meerkat (app) =

Defunct live streaming mobile application

- Original author: Ben Rubin
- Developers: Life On Air, Inc.
- Stable release: iOS: 1.3 (May 2, 2015; 11 years ago) [±] Android: 0.9.6 (May 10, 2015; 11 years ago) [±]
- Operating system: iOS, Android
- Platform: Unity
- Successor: Houseparty
- Available in: English
- Type: Video streaming, social networking service
- Website: www.meerkatapp.co

Meerkat was a mobile app that allowed users to broadcast live video streaming through their mobile devices. Upon registration, Meerkat users had the choice to connect their Facebook and Twitter accounts, facilitating direct streaming to their followers immediately upon going live. The app was available for both iOS and Android.

The app was launched in February 2015 and gained rapid popularity following its debut on the Product Hunt. It also saw widespread use during the South by Southwest Interactive Festival in March 2015.

On October 4, 2016, Meerkat was shut down and subsequently replaced by Houseparty.

== Development ==
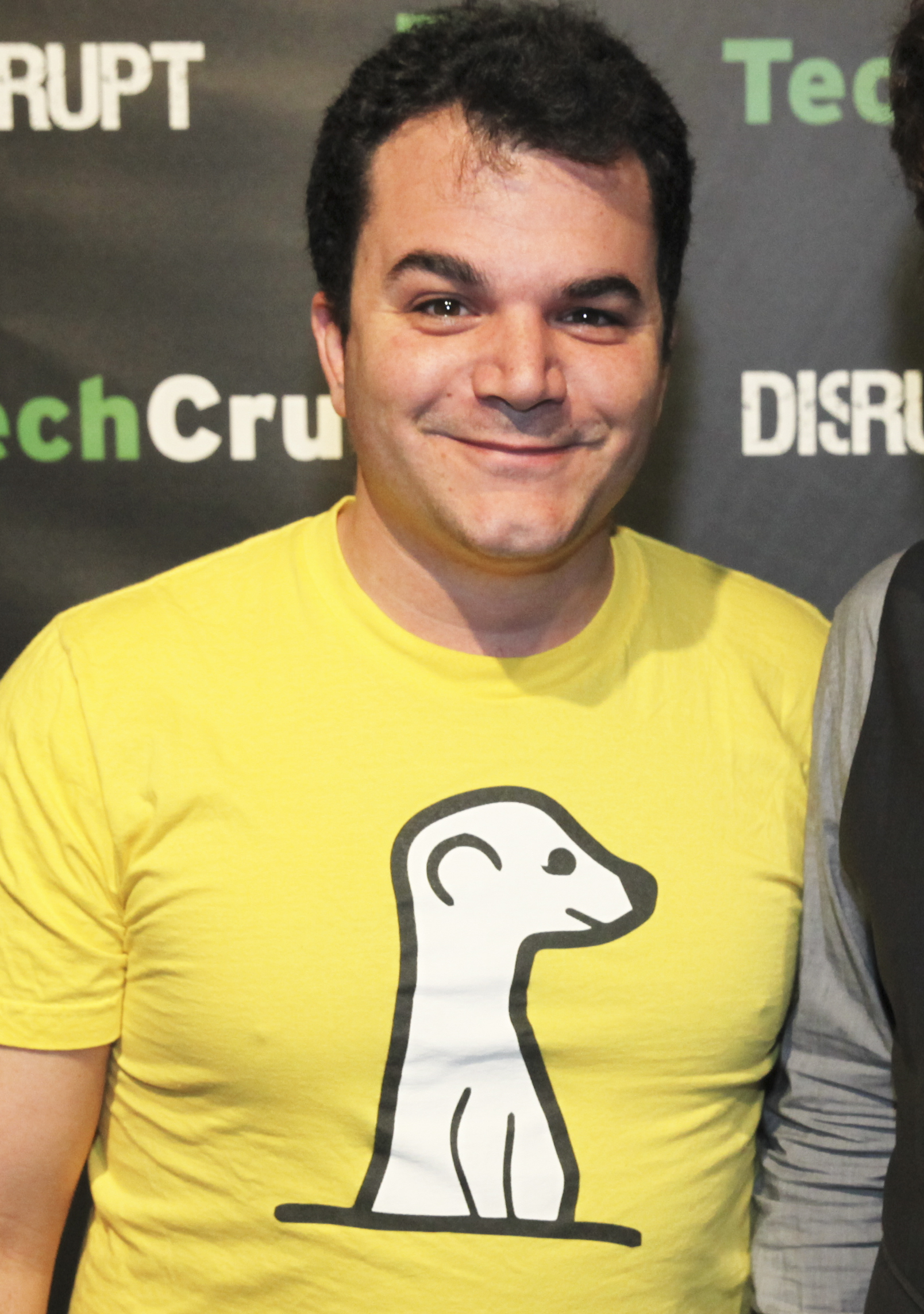
Ben Rubin promoting Meerkat in 2015

Meerkat was developed by Life On Air, Inc., a team led by founder and CEO Ben Rubin. The back-end that powered the app was developed over the course of two years for a previous video product of theirs.

The company raised $12 million in venture capital funding from Greylock Partners in March 2015.

On October 4, 2016, The app was withdrawn from the App Store and Play Store, and all associated services stopped. The Meerkat website now redirects to the creator's new app, Houseparty. According to the creators, the new app, which "has been in development for 10 months, and moves away from public broadcasts in favour of private chats."

== Twitter reaction ==
In March 2015, weeks after the release of Meerkat, Twitter cut off Meerkat's access to its social graph, then announced the acquisition of the competing app Periscope. Twitter publicly launched Periscope on March 26, 2015. Apart from providing the similar functionality of live-streaming to users' Twitter followers, Periscope also gives users an option to let anyone play the stream back.
