= List of Youku original programming =

Youku Tudou Inc. (formerly Youku Inc.), doing business as Youku is a video hosting service based in Beijing, China. It operates as a subsidiary of Alibaba Group Holding Limited.

On 12 March 2012, Youku reached an agreement to merge with Tudou in a stock-for-stock transaction, the new entity being named Youku Tudou Inc. In 2014, it had more than 500 million monthly active users, with 800 million daily video views.

Youku is one of China's top online video and streaming service platforms, along with iQiyi, Sohu, LeTV, Tencent Video, PPTV, 56.com and Funshion. However, Youku's domination in the Chinese market was toppled by its competitor Baidu's iQiyi in 2015.

== Original programming ==
Youku original programs:

Title	Genre	Premiere	Seasons	Status
The Ten Deadly Sins	Crime	July 26, 2016	21 episodes	Ended
Mengfei Comes Across	Comedy/romance	June 8, 2018	36 episodes	Ended
Day And Night	Crime	August 30, 2017	32 episodes	Ended
Guardian	Fantasy	June 13, 2018	40 episodes	Ended
Bloody Romance	Drama	July 24, 2018	36 episodes	Ended
S.C.I.	Crime	June 26, 2018	24 episodes	Ended
Rakshasa Street	Fantasy	August 2, 2017	24 episodes	Ended
A Step into the Past	Fantasy	January 18, 2018	40 episodes	Ended
Let's Shake It	Comedy/fantasy	August 7, 2017	25 episodes	Ended
Fresh Teachers	Comedy	March 28, 2017	24 episodes	Ended
Cambrian Period	Fantasy	May 9, 2017	24 episodes	Ended
Women In Shanghai	Drama	May 8, 2018	20 episodes	Ended
Women In Beijing	Drama	April 10, 2018	20 episodes	Ended
My Wife Is A Fox	Drama	October 10, 2016	45 episodes	Ended
Mr. Express & Miss Concubine	Drama	March 8, 2017	13 episodes	Ended
Eagles And Youngster	Drama	August 30, 2018	40 episodes	Ended
I'm not Gonna be Bullied by Girls	Teen drama	April 12, 2018	24 episodes	Ended
Best Lover	Comedy/drama	November 14, 2016	16 episodes	Ended
Martial Universe II	Fantasy/drama	October 11, 2018	20 episodes	Ended
Surprise	Comedy	August 6, 2013	3 seasons, 2 specials, 42 episodes	Ended
The Strongest Men Of God	Drama	January 5, 2018	36 episodes	Ended
Xiya Xia	Comedy	December 12, 2016	30 episodes	Ended
Seventeen Blue	Drama	November 8, 2015	24 episodes	Ended
Waiting For Someone	Fantasy drama	March 13, 2017	17 episodes	Ended
Shadow of Justice	Crime	September 19, 2018	36 episodes	Ended
Superpower Family	Comedy	December 19, 2016	30 episodes	Ended
I am Sorry, I Love You	Drama	August 24, 2015	39 episodes	Ended
Pal Inn	Fantasy	June 16, 2015	30 episodes	Ended
Your Majesty	Fantasy	April 25, 2016	39 episodes	Ended
Limbo Biography	Drama	October 29, 2014	23 episodes	Ended
Hip Hop Quartets	Comedy	August 12, 2009	5 seasons, 60 episodes	Ended
Super Hero Made in China Season 2	Comedy	November 8, 2016	10 episodes	Ended
To Be A Better Man	Comedy	September 24, 2015	15 episodes	Ended
New Hip Hop Quartets	Comedy	October 10, 2015	18 episodes	Ended
Shan Hai Jing Zhi Shan He Tu	Fantasy	December 31, 2015	20 episodes	Ended
Jue Shi Gao Shou Zhi Da Xia Lu Xiao Yu	Comedy	January 15, 2014	6 episodes	Ended
Proud Of Love	Teen drama	September 19, 2016	2 seasons, 38 episodes	Ended
Jenius	Drama	April 24, 2015	10 episodes	Ended
You Show	Talk show	December 11, 2015	16 episodes	Ended
Ex-MoDel	Comedy/short	April 1, 2014	2 seasons, 20 episodes	Ended
Lonely Gourmet	Drama	May 28, 2015	12 episodes	Ended
Dream Knight	Korean/teen drama	May 13, 2015	12 episodes	Ended
Super Soccer	Comedy drama	July 25, 2014	20 episodes	Ended
The Longest Day In Chang'an	Drama	June 27, 2019	48 episodes	Ended
Jiang Hu Xue Yuan	Comedy	February 21, 2015	8 episodes	Ended
City Of Fantasy	Drama	October 21, 2014	8 episodes	Ended
Nan Ren Bu Huai	Comedy	March 10, 2015	20 episodes	Ended
Se Nv Lang	Comedy	August 30, 2010	4 episodes	Ended
The Breakup Guru	Comedy	June 27, 2014	8 episodes	Ended
The Lively Family	Comedy	December 12, 2017	24 episodes	Ended
Miss Badass	Comedy	March 10, 2015	2 seasons, 15 episodes	Ended
Newbie Sales	Comedy	May 25, 2014	13 episodes	Ended
Fei Chang Ai Qing Kuang	Comedy	March 26, 2010	24 episodes	Ended
YIF show	Comedy	March 26, 2010	2 seasons, 28 episodes	Ended
The party B and party A	Comedy	May 17, 2013	2 seasons, 20 episodes	Ended
Hero's Dream	Drama	May 10, 2018	8 episodes	Ended
She's Adam	Drama	August 18, 2015	8 episodes	Ended
CEO Of Love	Drama	October 10, 2015	14 episodes	Removed
Dream and Reality	Drama	November 14, 2014	7 episodes	Ended
Tou Hao Fei Wen	Comedy	October 3, 2014	12 episodes	Ended
My Bubble Summer	Drama	October 25, 2010	20 episodes	Removed
Tian Sheng Yun Dong Kuang	Comedy	March 31, 2010	8 episodes	Ended
Xing Fu Qi Dian Zhan	Comedy	April 9, 2010	10 episodes	Ended
Quan You 7 Xiao Guo	Comedy	October 9, 2010	11 episodes	Ended

=== Co-productions ===
Title	Genre	Co-network	Premiere	Seasons	Status
DIRENJIE - The Famous Detective	Comedy drama	Tencent Video	February 25, 2015	12 episodes	Ended
Lie Ren Gong Hui Zhi Fei Ni Mo Shu	Comedy drama	Tianjin Television	December 31, 2014	11 episodes	Ended
