= Murat Vargı =

Turkish billionaire businessman (born 1947)

- Born: 1947 (age 78–79)
- Education: Helsinki School of Economics
- Occupations: founder, chairman and president of MV Holding
- Known for: founder of Turkcell
- Spouse: Married
- Children: 2

Murat Vargı (born 1947) is a Turkish billionaire businessman, the founder, chairman and president of MV Holding, and the founder of Turkcell, Turkey's largest mobile phone service provider. He is also the co-founder of KVK.

Vargı was born in 1947. He has a bachelor's degree from the Helsinki School of Economics.

Vargı is married, with two children, and lives in Monaco.
