= National Streaming Day =

Unofficial holiday for streaming media

- Observed by: International
- Type: Cultural
- Significance: A day celebrating streaming services and promotional offers
- Celebrations: Streaming media
- Date: May 20
- Frequency: annual
- Related to: Roku, Disney+, ESPN+, Streaming media

National Streaming Day is an unofficial holiday occurring on May 20, intended to celebrate streaming media. It was established in 2014 by Roku. In recent years, some streaming services have used the holiday to offer streaming promotions or discounted products.

== Origins ==
National Streaming Day was started by the streaming platform Roku, initially to celebrate the anniversary of their first streaming device launch, The Netflix Player, on May 20, 2008. The first holiday was celebrated on May 20, 2014. It began as a celebration of streaming, with users of streaming platforms "encouraged to stream at least 60 minutes of their favorite entertainment today and share their selection using hashtag."

More recently, the holiday began to see streaming services make announcements of upcoming content and/or releases. Roku often offers discounts on their devices, such as Roku Streaming Stick+ and Roku Ultra. They also offered free access to normally exclusive content that would require payment or subscription. This was following a partnership with Showtime to offer some of their exclusive content for free on May 20.

On National Streaming Day 2020, Disney+, ESPN+ and Roku announced a collaboration to release exclusive news and series sneak peeks.

== Announcements ==
On National Streaming Day 2020, Disney announced the release of Muppets Now, an unscripted Muppets show to air on Disney+. It also used the unofficial holiday to announce a monthly bundle deal where the three streaming services were available for $12.99 a month. Disney used May 20, 2020, to also announce the release of new content, the film Artemis Fowl. During the same year, ESPN used National Streaming Day to announce the return of Peyton's Places for a second season.

In 2021, Roku announced the release of their new Roku Originals on National Streaming Day.
