= Argela =

Turkish telecommunications corporation

Argela Technologies
- Company type: Private
- Industry: Telecommunication; Small cells Network performance monitoring Software-defined networks
- Founded: Istanbul, Turkey; 2004
- Founder: Bulent Kaytaz
- Headquarters: İTÜ Ayazağa Kampüsü, Teknokent Arı 3 Binası, Kat:6 34469 Maslak Sarıyer; Istanbul, Turkey
- Area served: Worldwide
- Products: See products listing
- Website: www.argela.com

Argela is a multinational corporation based in Turkey that develops communication technologies mainly for the telecom, public safety, and defense sectors. Founded in 2004, it was acquired by Türk Telekom in 2007. It is headquartered in Istanbul. Argela also has branches in Sunnyvale and Ankara.

Argela's products include Femtocell, fixed-mobile convergence, IMS/IN Applications, service delivery framework, three-screen TV services and performance-monitoring tools

== Products ==
=== iTV ===
Argela's iTV is an Internet television service distributed via the Internet. It allows the users to choose the program or the TV show they want to watch from an archive (VoD, TSTV) or live from a channel directory.

=== Argela ADz-on advertising platform ===
Argela ADz-on consists of: ADz-on-Voice, ADz-on-Messaging, ADz-on-TV, ADz-on-Internet and ADz-on-VAS, and Adz-on Ringback Tone Advertising.

=== SCP & IN Applications ===
Argela’a Service Control Platform (SCP) is the platform where multiple IN services can be deployed, including ICS(Intra Call Service), Ring Back Tone (RBT), Mobile Virtual Private Network (MVPN), Anonymous Call Rejection (ACR), Smart Call Termination (SCT), Virtual Mobile Attendant (VMA).

=== IMS Applications ===
Argela's IMS Application portfolio includes Multimedia Ring Back Tone (M-RBT), Sponsored Call (SPC), Collect Call Service (CCS), 3rdParty Call Control (3PCC), Virtual Subscription (VS) and Centralized Service Management Platform.

=== Performance monitoring tools ===
Argela's monitoring tool dedicated to Prepaid subscribers; Prepaid Watcher has mechanisms to watch over and measure operators pre-paid systems.
