= Turkcell =

Turkish mobile phone operator

Turkcell İletişim Hizmetleri A.Ş.
- Type: S.A. (Public)
- Traded as: BİST: TCELL; Nasdaq: TKC; NYSE: TKC
- Industry: Telecommunications
- Founded: 27 February 1994; 32 years ago
- Founder: Finland PTT; Ericsson Telekomünikasyon Anonim Şirketi; Kavala Yatırım Anonim Şirketi; Hüseyin Murat Vargı
- Headquarters: Istanbul, Turkey
- Area served: Turkey, Northern Cyprus
- Key people: Şenol Kazancı (Chairman); Ali Taha Koç (CEO)
- Products: Mobile telephony & Internet services
- Revenue: ▲ ₺ 35.9 billion (2021)
- Operating income: ▲ ₺ 7.7 billion (2021)
- Net income: ▲ ₺ 5 billion (2021)
- Total assets: ▲ ₺ 17.147 billion (2011)
- Total equity: ▲ ₺ 10.793 billion (2011)
- Owner: Turkey Wealth Fund (26.2%); LetterOne (19.8%); Free float (54%)
- Number of employees: 26,000 (December, 2021)
- Divisions: List: Turktell Uluslararası Turkcell Global Bilgi Financell Turktell Bilişim A-Tel Fintur Holdings B.V. (%41,45)
- Subsidiaries: List: Turkcell Europe BeST Kuzey Kıbrıs Turkcell Turkcell Superonline İnteltek Global Tower
- Website: www.turkcell.com.tr www.kktcell.com (Northern Cyprus)

Turkcell İletişim Hizmetleri A.Ş. (lit. 'Turkcell Communication Services') (BİST: TCELL, NYSE: TKC) is the leading mobile phone operator in Turkey, based in Istanbul. The company has 39.3 million subscribers as of September 2021. In 2015, the company's number of subscribers climbed to 68.9 million, in nine countries. The largest shareholder is Turkey Wealth Fund with 26.2% ownership. It is listed on the Fortune 2000 list of the world's biggest companies, published by Fortune. Turkcell has also developed Yaani, a browser for mobile and desktop. Turkcell's general manager is Ali Taha Koç.

== Company background ==
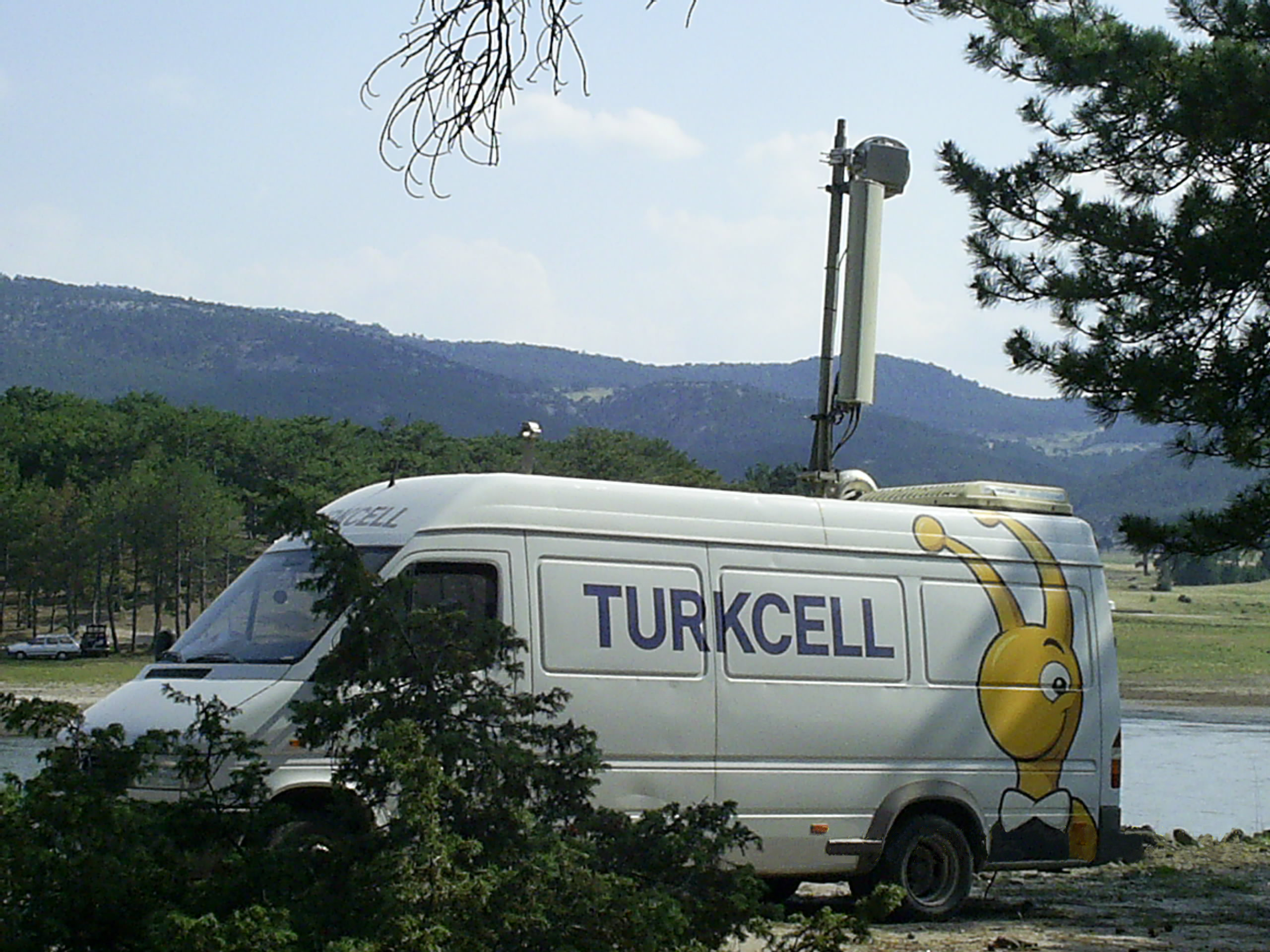
Turkcell mobile base station in Eskişehir, Turkey, 2007

In February 1994, Turkcell started Turkey's first GSM network. In Q3 2012, it had a market share of 52.4%. Its competitors were Vodafone with a market share of 27.9% and Avea with a market share of 19.7%.

Turkcell is the first Turkish company to be listed on the New York Stock Exchange, where its shares have been traded since 11 July 2000 along with trading on the Istanbul Stock Exchange.

Turkcell also provides GSM services internationally. It has 9.6 million subscribers via Fintur Holdings and its affiliates in partnership with TeliaSonera in Azerbaijan, Kazakhstan, Georgia and Moldova, as of 30 September 2007. In 2009, they were the first company to get 3G services for their customers in Turkey. In 2015, Turkcell completed the acquisition of a 44.96% stake in Ukrainian mobile phone operator Life :) It had 13.6 million subscribers at that time.

Turkcell also provides IPTV service in Turkey.

In October 2020, TVF Bilgi Teknolojileri Iletisim Hizmetleri Yatirim Sanayi ve Ticaret A.S. a subsidiary of Turkey Wealth Fund, the wealth fund of the Republic of Turkey, acquired control of 26.2% of Turkcell. 19.8% of Turkcell's shares are controlled by the second-largest shareholder IMTIS Holdings S.a r.l., an entity in which Letterone Investment Holdings S.A. has an indirect economic interest.

== Coverage area ==
Turkcell provides coverage of an area that, as of 31 March 2007, includes 100% of the population living in cities of 3,000 or more people, 97.21% of the total population, and 80.44% of Turkey's land area. The company has a few blind spots, especially in mountainous areas in the Eastern region.

== Northern Cyprus ==
Turkcell also operates overseas. Its Northern Cyprus brand is known as Kuzey Kıbrıs Turkcell (North Cyprus Turkcell) which operates only in the Northern Cyprus. KKTcell runs completely separately from Turkey's Turkcell, although the ownership of the network is the same. KKTcell is currently also the North's largest Network Provider in terms of registered users and network coverage. KKTcell numbers can be distinguished from Mainland Turkey Turkcell numbers easily, as KKTcell numbers begin with 90 (533) 8XX-XXXX.

== Roaming ==
Turkcell has international roaming agreements with 605 operators in 201 countries as of September 2008. It claims to have more international GPRS roaming agreements than any other operator (356 operators in 143 countries as of 31 August 2008). It also applies discounted roaming costs when calling from a Turkcell mobile to a KKTurkcell number.

== Sponsorship ==
Turkcell has been the "Official Communication Sponsor" of the national football and basketball teams since 2002. Turkcell was the main and name sponsor of the first Turkish football league, the Turkish Super League, from 2005 to 2010. It also sponsors 14 of the 18 football teams in the Süper Lig. The "Turkcell Football Awards" project was initiated in 2003 to encourage "fair play" by awarding athletes who show fairness, impartiality, and solidarity.

Turkcell also sponsors the International Istanbul Film Festival and co-sponsors the Istanbul International Jazz Festival. Since 1999, Turkcell has supported the restoration of the ancient city walls in Bodrum. The last phase of the project, the restoration of an ancient theater, was completed in June 2003.

Turkcell has also continued to sponsor the CeBIT Bilişim Eurasia event, one of the major information technology fairs in Europe, for the tenth time in 2007.

Turkcell's main educational project, "Modern Girls of Modern Turkey", which started in 2000, grants scholarships to 5,000 young women in less developed parts of the country. The project received international recognition in June 2001, when it won the UK "Institute of Public Relations Excellence Award" and the "Crystal Obelisk Award" from the Foundation of Women Executives in Public Relations in New York City in 2002.

== Criticisms ==
=== Advertisement injection ===
Turkcell Superonline, one of Turkcell's subsidiaries and a major Internet service provider in Turkey, has been criticized for injecting advertisements. The company has not responded to questioning about the injections. This event was described as the first evidence of traffic monitoring and manipulation in Turkey with deep packet inspection.

== MTN Group court case ==
In May 2013, Turkcell dropped its multibillion-dollar US lawsuit against MTN Group, citing a US Supreme Court ruling that hurt its case. The operator filed a $4.2 billion lawsuit in Washington in 2012 alleging the company used bribery to win a mobile license in Iran that was first awarded to Turkcell. The court delayed the case in October 2012 pending a US Supreme Court decision on the Alien Tort Statute, the U.S. human rights law on which Turkcell's suit is based.
