= Vodafone Turkey =

Turkish telecommunications company

Vodafone Telekomünikasyon Anonim Şirketi
- Type: Subsidiary
- Industry: Mobile telecommunications
- Founded: 19 May 1994 (Telsim); 24 May 2006 (Vodafone Turkey)
- Headquarters: Istanbul, Turkey
- Key people: Engin Aksoy (CEO)
- Products: Mobile phone services, mobile phone related goods
- Revenue: GBP 424 million
- Parent: Vodafone Group Plc
- Website: vodafone.com.tr/en

Vodafone Telekomünikasyon Anonim Şirketi or Vodafone Turkey (Turkish: Vodafone Türkiye) is a Turkish mobile telecommunications company. It was formed when Telsim, which was founded by the Uzan Group, was incorporated into Vodafone on 28 December 2005. On 24 May 2006 Telsim brand name was changed to Vodafone Turkey. Incorporated by the Vodafone, Vodafone Turkey is the second-biggest mobile communication company of Turkey with 20.6 million users as of 11 November 2014, an increase of 105,000 customers from the fourth quarter of 2011. The total investment of Vodafone Turkey, including the acquisitions, since 2006 has exceeded TL 11 billion.

Vodafone Turkey operates in 81 cities of Turkey with its approximately more than 3300 employees, more than 1200 stores, 23 thousand points of sale and a stakeholder family of 53 thousand people.

Vodafone Turkey also provides IPTV service in Turkey.

Vodafone Turkey's subsidiary in Northern Cyprus is KKTC Telsim.
