= Media censorship and disinformation during the Gezi Park protests =

The 2013 Gezi Park protests in Turkey saw massive amounts of censorship and disinformation by the mainstream media, especially by those supporting Prime Minister Recep Tayyip Erdoğan and his Justice and Development Party (AKP). A poll done by Istanbul Bilgi University in the first week of the protests showed that 84% of the demonstrators cited the lack of media coverage as a reason to join the protests, higher than the 56% of protesters who referred to the destruction of Gezi Park.

== Censorship during protests ==
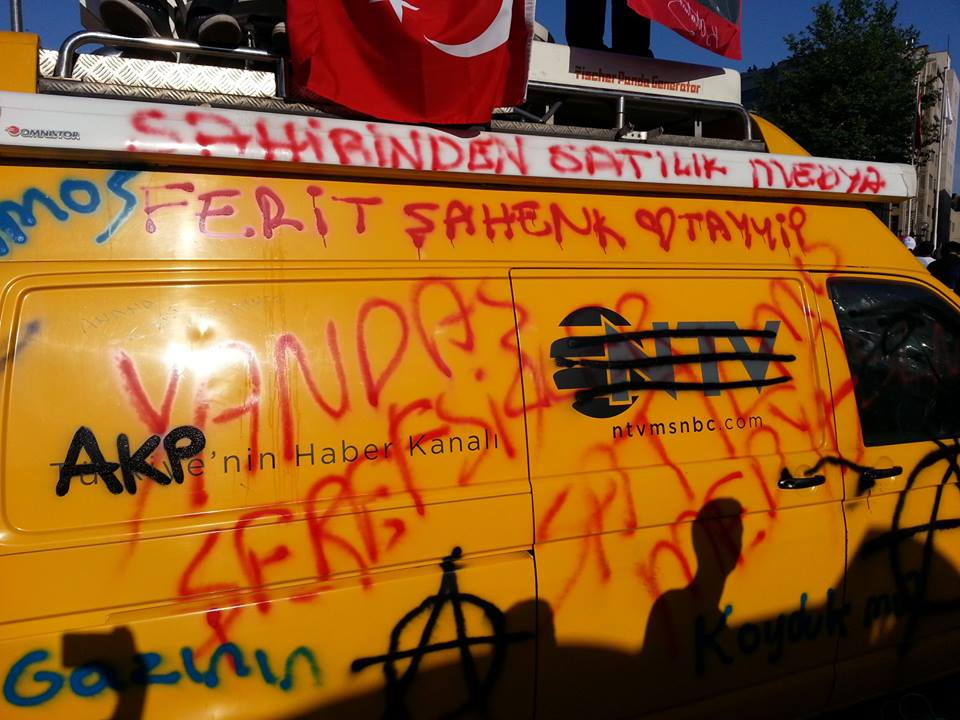
This NTV broadcast van has been covered with protest graffiti, in response to the indifference of mainstream media to protests.

=== History ===
Censorship is a common issue in Turkey. Since 2011, the AKP has increasingly levied restrictions on freedom of speech, freedom of the press, and internet use, and television content, as well as the right to free assembly. It has also developed links with media groups, and used administrative and legal measures (including, in one case, a $2.5 billion tax fine) against critical media groups and critical journalists: "over the last decade the AKP has built an informal, powerful, coalition of party-affiliated businessmen and media outlets whose livelihoods depend on the political order that Erdoğan is constructing. Those who resist do so at their own risk."

=== Televisions ===
[On the afternoon of Friday, May 31, 2013] CNN Turk was broadcasting a food show, featuring the "flavors of Niğde." Other major Turkish news channels were showing a dance contest and a roundtable on study-abroad programs. It was a classic case of the revolution not being televised. The whole country seemed to be experiencing a cognitive disconnect, with Twitter saying one thing, the government saying another, and the television off on another planet.

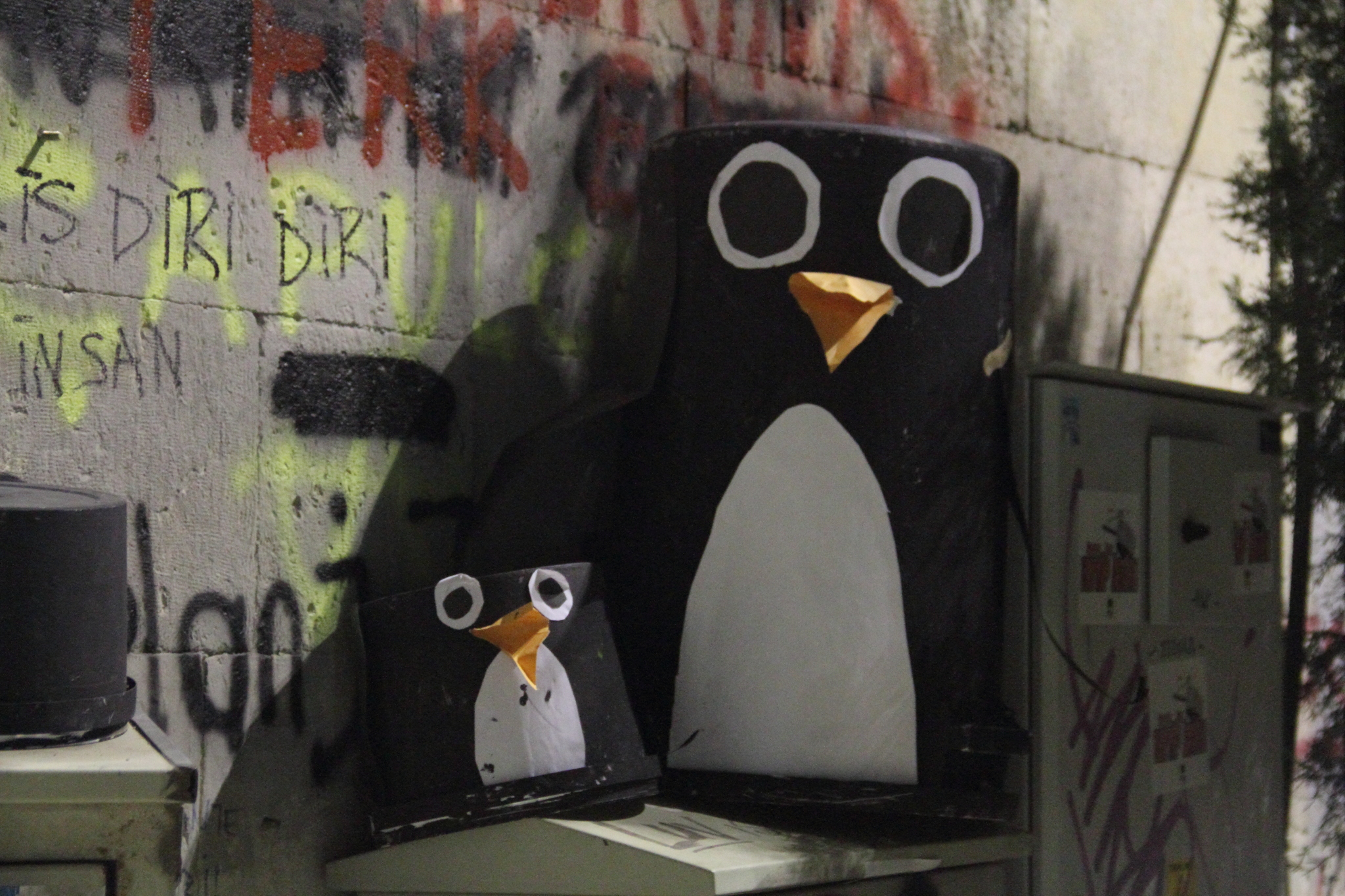
Penguin art at Gezi Park, satirizing the extended CNN Turk broadcast of a documentary on penguins despite the massive protests occurring on the streets.

- At 1 am on 2 June, CNN Turk was broadcasting a documentary on penguins while CNN International was showing live coverage of the protests in Turkey. "Many of the protesters complained about the lack of coverage on Turkish television. Some newspapers too were largely silent on the protests: on Saturday morning [2 June], the lead article in Sabah, a major pro-government newspaper, was about Erdoğan's campaign against smoking." Sabah's front page on 2 June did not feature the protests at all, but found space to cover "President Abdullah Gul being presented with a horse during his official visit to Turkmenistan."
- On 3 June, the TV game show Kelime Oyunu ("Word Game"), on Bloomberg HT TV, hosted by Ali İhsan Varol supported the protests by placing 70 questions and answers (e.g. "gazmaskesi", gas masks) that referred to the protests. A previous attempt to smuggle protest support into other television shows included Kenan Doğulu taking off his top on a Turkish TV show ("Elidor Miss Turkey", Star TV, 31 May) to reveal an "Occupy Gezi" T-shirt.

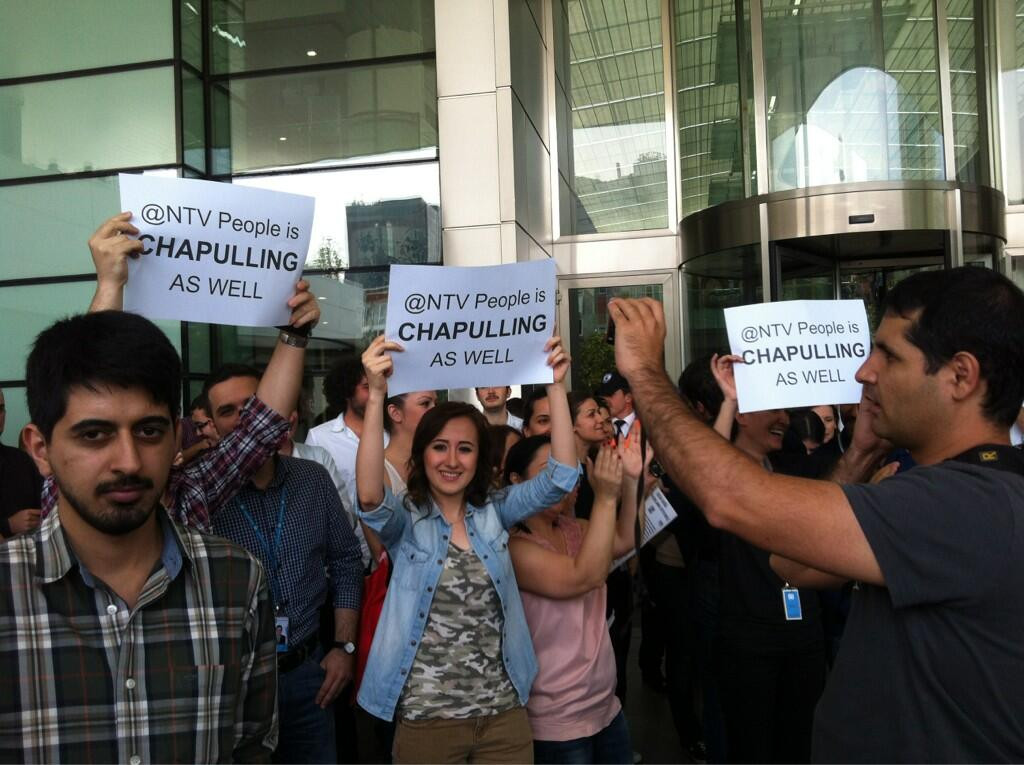
Protesters in front of NTV, which also broadcast a documentary instead of the protests.

- On 3 June, thousands of white-collar people working in the financial district of Maslak and Levent were gathered in front of Doğuş Media Center to protest coverage by Doğuş Holding's NTV, one of the major news channels. NTV was forced to broadcast events live, while protesters chanted "satılmış medya istemiyoruz" ("We do not want media that is for sale."), "Tayyip istifa" ("Resign Tayyip"), "Her yer Taksim, her yer direniş" ("Taksim everywhere, resistance everywhere"). Some NTV staff resigned in protest at the lack of coverage. The CEO of Doğuş Media Group, Cem Aydın, conceded that the criticisms were "fair to a large extent", and that "Our audience feels like they were betrayed." Shortly after his comments, Aydın left Doğuş Media.

=== Newspapers ===
- Seven pro-government newspapers were published with an identical headline in support of Erdoğan on June 7.

=== Social media ===
As a result of the lack of mainstream media coverage, social media played a key role in keeping people informed, with Twitter hashtags #OccupyGezi and #DirenGeziParki ("Resist, Gezi Park") being adopted. In the 12 hours from 4 pm 31 May, there were more than 2 million tweets for the 3 leading hashtags, with 88% in Turkish and 90% of geolocated tweets coming from Turkey. Erdoğan said in a speech that "There is now a menace which is called Twitter. The best examples of lies can be found there. To me, social media is the worst menace to society." A December 2012 Pew Research Center study showed 35% of Turks using social networking sites.

Sixteen people in İzmir and thirteen people in Adana were detained for posting provocative messages on Twitter but were released later. Sabah wrote that some of those people were arrested for tweets about actions like "We've burned Bank Asya", "We destroyed the Körfez cram school", "We've burned the FEM cram school".

There were reports that the 3G signal in some areas had been turned off; in response, some shops and offices removed security from their Wifi networks. Rumours of censorship led to increasing use of virtual private networks (VPNs) during the protests.

According to The Economist, "Mr Erdogan's perceived enemies" have been "inundated with menacing tweets." These include a correspondent covering the protests being called a "dirty Armenian" and "a slut" by pro-government supporters.

=== Reactions to censorship ===
- NTV Turkey refused to air a BBC World News package on press freedom in Turkey; in response, the BBC suspended its contract with the channel.
- A campaign was started to force CNN International to pull its name franchise from CNN Türk in response to its lack of coverage of the protests as well as the aforementioned infamous penguin incident. More than 108,000 people signed the petition.

=== Pressure on journalists ===
- According to the Turkish Journalists Union (TGS), at least 22 journalists have been fired and 37 forced to quit over their coverage of the Gezi Park protests.
- The controversial mayor of Ankara, Melih Gökçek, who is also a member of the ruling AKP launched a Twitter campaign against Selin Girit of BBC, accusing her of being an English spy and trying to undermine the Turkish economy in her reporting.
- Turkey's premier popular history magazine NTV Tarih was closed down by its administration, because it was preparing a special issue on Gezi Park protests. Owner of the magazine was Doğuş Media Group, also owner of the NTV television channel. CEO of the group Ferit Şahenk was criticised for his auto-censorship policy, which was aimed not to anger the AKP government. The Gezi Park issue later got published on the internet and as a book by the sacked journalists of NTV Tarih.
- Later in June, the state media regulator RTÜK fined a number of channels (including Halk TV and Ulusal Kanal) "for 'harming the physical, moral and mental development of children and young people' by broadcasting coverage of the Gezi Park protests". Members of RTÜK are appointed by the government, and the fines were approved by the 6 AKP members of the 9-member group, against the 3 votes of the opposition. Hayat TV, which had also given the protests extensive coverage, was ordered to stop broadcasting on 14 June, although RTÜK reversed its decision in the face of protests.
- The governor of Eskişehir sent a threatening e-mail to the journalist İsmail Saymaz, over his reports on a Gezi protester's murder in Eskişehir.
- Mehmet Barlas, chief editor of the pro-AKP newspaper Sabah wrote that the CEO of the Doğan Holding Aydın Doğan should warn his writers who sympathize with Gezi park protesters. A few days later Akif Beki, a pro-AKP columnist started writing for Hürriyet, Doğan Holding's main newspaper.
- Administration of Sabah newspaper fired its ombudsman Yavuz Baydar because he criticised the newspaper's disinformative approach during Gezi protests.

== Disinformation during protests ==
The 2013 protests in Turkey witnessed a large amount of disinformation being spread by pro-AKP, conservative, and Islamist media, also dubbed as Yandaş Medya ("Slanted Media"). Leading newspapers said to be spreading disinformation were Yeni Şafak, Yeni Akit, Daily Sabah, Star, Takvim, Bugün, Akşam, Zaman, Türkiye, Milli Gazete, Güneş, and Milat, among others. Leading TV channels spreading disinformation were Kanal 7, 24, Ülke TV, TRT, Samanyolu, ATV, TGRT, Sky Turk 360, TV Net, TV8, Beyaz TV, Kanaltürk, and Kanal A. Leading internet portals said to be spreading disinformation were Haber 7, Habervaktim, En Son Haber, and Rotahaber.

- June 1: Some pro-AKP journalists like Nihal Bengisu Karaca claimed that women in headscarves were being attacked by Gezi protesters. One claimed case in Istanbul's Kabataş district became the centre of attention and pro-AKP media claimed that there was security camera footage of the attack. However, the governor of Istanbul said that he didn't see any videos of an attack. Eight months later, on 14 February 2014, the video was released, showing that there had been no attack on the woman, disproving her and the AKP's claims.
- June 4: Pro-AKP newspapers like Yeni Şafak claimed that protesters who took refuge in Dolmabahçe Mosque during a police raid had drunk beer inside the mosque. PM Recep Tayyip Erdoğan said that they would release security cam videos of this action. However, the imam of Dolmabahçe mosque denied those allegations and no videos were ever released to the public. Later, the imam of the mosque got assigned to the mosque of a small village on the outskirts of Istanbul. Yeni Şafak claimed on the same day that Gezi protesters were preparing for a big provocation and planning to burn the streets an on the holy Islamic day of Isra and Mi'raj. Yeni Şafak also claimed that protests were organized by some Turkish advertising agencies and they released an open list of the agencies they accused of organizing the protests.
- June 5: Mustafa Durdu, a columnist of the Islamist extremist Akit newspaper, claimed that protesters may even have performed group sex inside Dolmabahçe Mosque.

Turkish public broadcasting service TRT aired footage of people burning the Turkish flag. The footage was originally aired in 2010 but featured doctored dates, implying the current demonstrations were somehow secessionist in nature.

- June 6: Pro-AKP newspapers like Sabah reported that the protests were planned by the Serbian civil society organization Otpor!. Pro-AKP newspaper Yeni Şafak claimed that the Zello mobile app, which was used by protesters to communicate during the protests, was served to them by a source in Houston and that protesters were taking orders from that source.
- June 7: Police officer Mustafa Sarı died after falling off a bridge into an underpass while pursuing protesters in Adana. However, pro-government media sources like Rotahaber claimed that protesters pushed the police officer from the bridge. Family of Mustafa Sarı denied those claims.
- June 10: The newspaper Yeni Şafak claimed that a theatre play called "Mi Minor", allegedly supported by an agency in Britain, had held rehearsals of "revolution" in Turkey for months.
- June 12: The state-owned Anadolu Agency provided extensive reporting of protests in London over the G8, and attempted to create a Twitter campaign around the hashtag #occupylondon, which was picked up by AKP supporters.
- June 13: The Islamist Akit newspaper claimed that prostitution and group sex was common at Gezi park after 2 am. They based this claim on an "anonymous journalist who saw this happening with his own eyes and told it to someone else".
- June 14: Pro-government internet portal RotaHaber claimed that a Turkish national working as security chief at the United States embassy in Adana was active during protests and that he was an American agent.
- June 15: Akit accused supermarket chain Migros of delivering free supplies to the protesters at Gezi park. However, goods delivered to the park were bought by protesters through supermarket's internet shop.
- June 18: After the clearing of Gezi Park camp, Erdem Gündüz started the Standing Man/Woman protest that spread to all over Turkey. Pro-AKP newspapers claimed that standing protest is a CIA tactic from their handbook for non-violent action.

Takvim newspaper devoted its front page to a fake "interview" with CNN's Christiane Amanpour, in which Amanpour supposedly confesses that CNN's coverage of the protests was motivated by "the express interest of destabilizing Turkey for international business interests". The paper included a small disclaimer on the 14th page, saying "This interview is not real, but what you will read here is real." Takvim newspaper also sued Amanpour.

- June 18: Pro-AKP internet portal Haber 7 claimed that during the first days of the protests, anti-government protesters were planning a civilian coup d'état by occupying PM Recep Tayyip Erdoğan's Ankara home and Istanbul office.
- June 24: During one of the public forums in Istanbul, which was televised live on Halk TV, a protester said that maybe they should wear police uniforms to protest police brutality. Pro-AKP media sources like Yeni Şafak served this as "Halk TV is planning a provocation by telling protesters to wear police uniforms and make false flag attacks".
- June 27: Ethem Sarısülük was shot dead by a police officer during the protests in Ankara. Pro-AKP newspapers released pictures of Ethem Sarısülük holding an assault rifle and claimed that he was a member of a terrorist organization. However, later it was found out that those pictures were taken when Ethem Sarısülük was working as a labourer for the construction of a military post.
- July 22: Pro-AKP businessman Zeynel Abidin Erdem claimed that some source in Mexico bought 600 pizzas for the gezi park protesters.
- August 24: The Islamist Akit newspaper claimed that Gezi protesters were preparing for a big provocation on the August 30 Victory Day celebrations.
- August 26: World famous linguist and activist Noam Chomsky accused the pro-government Yeni Şafak newspaper of fabricating some parts of an interview that was done with him via email. The administration of Yeni Şafak denied this allegation and promised to release the original English content of emails. However, the released content was full of grammatical mistakes. Later it was found out that Yeni Şafak used the Google Translate service to translate fabricated Turkish content to English and served that as the original interview. After grammatical errors, particularly "milk port" became a sensation at social media, Yeni Şafak finally admitted some parts were fabricated and removed the interview from its web site.
- September 9: Istanbul was a candidate for the 2020 Summer Olympics, but lost out to Tokyo. Pro-AKP media and government officials blamed Gezi protesters for conspiring internationally so that Istanbul would lose.
- September 28: Beyaz TV, which is owned by the son of the mayor of Ankara, aired a program showing a 13-year-old child who claimed that he was paid by Gezi park protesters to throw stones at the police. The child also said that "protestors were probably drinking cat blood at the Gezi park".
- October: During autumn, Istanbul witnessed long traffic jams. Pro-AKP journalists accused Gezi protesters of deliberately causing traffic jams.
- November 3: The day after the grand opening of Marmaray project, many technical problems occurred. Pro-AKP Türkiye newspaper accused Gezi protesters of deliberately sabotaging Marmaray.
- November 20: The pro-AKP Takvim newspaper, which printed a fabricated interview with CNN's Christiane Amanpour, claimed that seven Turkish Jewish citizens who did their military service in Israel were agents of Mossad and they were the leaders of Gezi protests. The newspaper also accused CNN and BBC of being part of "this dirty plan".
- February 14: Months after the end of the protests, video footage revealed that there had been no attack on a woman wearing a headscarf by protesters on June 1. The woman and Prime Minister Erdoğan had claimed in press conferences and political rallies that protesters had attacked her and her baby.
- July 14: Pro-AKP Yeni Şafak released an article titled "The Horrible Istanbul Plan of Gezi Protestors" on their internet portal. The article claimed that Gezi protesters are conspiring to undermine the AKP government by wasting water in order to empty the dams supplying Istanbul. After the article became a source of mocking nationwide, Yeni Şafak removed the article from their web site.

== See also ==
- Backward Run (Turkish: Tornistan) a Turkish animated short film about media censorship during the 2013 protests
