= CNBC-e =

Turkish television channel

- Logo used since 2026
- Country: Turkey
- Headquarters: Istanbul, Turkey

Programming
- Languages: Turkish; English (with Turkish subtitles)
- Picture format: 16:9

Ownership
- Owner: Doğuş Media Group (2000–2015); Discovery Communications (2015); İlbak Holding (2024–present); NBCUniversal (2024–2026); Versant (2026–present)
- Parent: Versant
- Sister channels: NTV e2 Kral TV; NTV Spor (before 2015); CNBC Europe (Hotbird 13.0E is broadcasting on satellite) (2024–present)

History
- Launched: 16 October 2000; 25 years ago (original); 10 June 2024; 2 years ago (relaunch)
- Replaced: Kanal E
- Closed: 6 November 2015; 10 years ago (original)
- Replaced by: TLC (original)

Links
- Webcast: www.cnbce.com/canli-yayin
- Website: www.cnbce.com

CNBC-e is a Turkish free-to-air television channel operated in Turkey by Versant and İlbak Holding since 10 June 2024. Formerly, the channel with the same name was operated by NBCUniversal and the Doğuş Media Group between 2000 and 2015.

== History ==
=== 1995–2000: Establishment of Kanal E ===
In 1995, Hakan Çizem launched Kanal E, Turkey's first channel dedicated to economic news.

Korkmaz Yiğit, the owner of Kanal 6, one of Turkey's first private channels, acquired Kanal E in 1998, along with Yeni Yüzyıl, Ateş, and Milliyet newspapers, to expand his media center. However, Yiğit's legal troubles in the late 1990s forced him to sell all his media properties, mostly back to their original owners. Kanal E was later sold to Doğuş Group, which also owned the continuous news channel NTV.

=== 2000–2015: Rise in mainstream media and closure ===
The CNBC-e logo used between 2000 and 2015.

Seeking to promote the channel using a globally recognized brand, Doğuş Holding partnered with NBC Universal, the owner of CNBC, to rebrand Kanal E as CNBC-e, with 50% ownership by NBC Universal and the remainder by Doğuş Holding. CNBC-e divided its programming into daytime and evening segments.

From 6:00 AM to 6:00 PM local time, CNBC-e targeted professionals and individual investors with real-time access to economic and market information. From 6:00 PM onwards, it aired series from American TV channels like FOX, HBO, The CW, ABC, NBC, and CBS, along with feature films, either with original subtitles or Turkish dubbing. Weekends included a Nickelodeon block for children.

On September 9, 2011, HD-en, a high-definition TV channel broadcasting programs from NTV, NTV Spor, CNBC-e, and e2, rebranded as HDe, the high-definition version of CNBC-e, and began simultaneous broadcasting. On September 12, 2011, the channel switched to a 16:9 aspect ratio. NTV Spor HD, for broadcasting sports events in HD, launched on July 23, 2012.

The SD version of HD-en, planned to be released as TV-en, was canceled after Doğuş Holding acquired Star TV, transferring the planned TV-en programs to Star TV instead.

The visual design of the channel's logo was inspired by the color codes of the peafowl logo of the parent channel, NBC.

==== Censorship ====
The channel faced multiple administrative fines from Turkey's Radio and Television Supreme Council (RTÜK) for the content of many American-origin movies and series, as well as the advertisements aired during these shows. This put the channel's management in a dilemma, as fans wanted to watch the series in their original form, while RTÜK demanded the removal of scenes involving sexuality and homosexuality. CNBC-e chose to be transparent with its viewers, explaining the reasons for scene cuts or penalties through detailed messages. Tobacco products were censored using a flower symbol, and self-censorship was applied in Nickelodeon block cartoons with their own dubbing.

==== Closure ====
Discovery Communications decided to acquire CNBC-e, a national economy and series channel owned by Doğuş Media Group. The acquisition was officially completed in October 2015. On November 6, 2015, CNBC-e ceased broadcasting, replaced by TLC Turkey, as announced on CNBC-e’s official Facebook page and website.

The channel ended its broadcast after airing the show Shameless on November 5, 2015.

Post-acquisition, the CNBCE.com economic portal was moved to NTVPara.com.

=== 2024: Reopening ===
The CNBC-e logo used between 2024 and 2026.

Since 2022, former CNBC-e employees, including former general manager Artunç Kocabalkan, hinted at the channel's revival. Kocabalkan stated, "Our team has been working to bring CNBC back to Turkey since September 2021."

In 2023, the current owner, İlbak Holding, and CNBC's websites officially announced the channel's reopening. In 2024, the return was promoted through billboards referencing the channel's comeback.

The official social media accounts announced the channel's relaunch on June 10, 2024, and as stated, the channel resumed broadcasting on that date.

== Programming ==
=== Economy ===
- 2024: Sabah Notları (with Meryem Kenan)
- 2024: e-Cafe (with Naz Özdeğirmenci)
- 2024: Para Ekranı (with Şafak Tükle)
- 2024: Finans Sohbetleri (with Güzem Yılmaz Ertem)
- 2024: Son Baskı (with Melis Hazal Karagöz)
- 2024: 4'te Ekonomi

=== Series ===
- 2024: The X-Files (10th and 11th season)
- 2024: The Offer
- 2024: Halo

=== Animated ===
- 2024: The Simpsons (30th season)

=== Contests ===
- 2024: Letterbox Türkiye (with Yiğit Kirazcı)
- 2024: America's Got Talent (also on CITV in the United Kingdom)

=== Talk Show ===
- 2024: The Tonight Show Starring Jimmy Fallon(also on CBBC in the United Kingdom)

=== Life Style ===
- 2024: Ece Sükan'la 3 S
- 2024: İş'ten Sohbetler (with Şafak Tükle)

=== Concerts ===
- 2024: 2Cellos
- 2024: Noah Jones
- 2024: Andrea Bocelli
- 2024: Lang Lang

=== Documentary ===
- 2024: American Greed
- 2024: Marketing: Media Money
- 2024: The Elon Musk Show(also on BBC Four)

=== Sports ===
- 2024: NBC Sports

== See also ==
- CNBC Europe
- Doğuş Group
- Cine5, a defunct Turkish pay-TV channel, was founded in 1993 and had similar coverage with CNBC-e except business news
