= Begüm Doğan Faralyalı =

Turkish businesswoman (born 1976)

- Born: Yaşar Begümhan Doğan; 25 July 1976 (age 50); Istanbul, Turkey
- Citizenship: Turkey
- Education: London School of Economics Stanford University
- Occupations: Entrepreneur; Businesswoman
- Spouse: Ahmet Faralyalı
- Children: Ayşenaz Faralyalı; Melisa Faralyalı
- Parent(s): Aydın Doğan; Sema Doğan
- Relatives: Arzuhan Doğan Yalçındağ (sister); Vuslat Doğan Sabancı (sister); Hanzade Doğan Boyner (sister); Ersin Faralyalı (father-in-law)

Yaşar Begümhan Doğan Faralyalı (born 1 January 1976) is a Turkish businesswoman who is the chairwoman of Doğan Holding. She is the youngest daughter of Aydın Doğan and Sema Doğan. She is the top 50 leading women in the world.

== Life and education ==
She was born in 1976 in Istanbul, the fourth daughter of Aydın Doğan and Sema Doğan, after Arzuhan, Vuslat and Hanzade. During her high school years, she played basketball for Beşiktaş until the age of 18. She completed her university education in economics and philosophy at the London School of Economics. After finishing his undergraduate education, he did his master's degree at Stanford University. In 2004, she married Ahmet Faralyalı, the son of former Minister of Energy Ersin Faralyalı. She had 2 children from this marriage.

== Business career ==
She started her professional career as a consultant at Arthur Andersen in New York. After this experience, she moved to Monitor Group in London. She advised on restructuring projects for leading European media and technology companies.

She joined Doğan Media Group in 2004 as vice president in charge of international growth and foreign investments before assuming the position of chairperson of the Board of Doğan Holding. In 2007, she founded Kanal D Romania, Romania's national entertainment channel. In 2009, he became CEO of Star TV, and in 2010 he became Chairman of Doğan TV Holding, which includes Kanal D and CNN Türk.

In January 2012, she became the chairperson of the board of Doğan Holding. Faralyalı is also the chairman of the board of Doğan Publishing, Sesa Production, Sesa Packaging and Karel.

Begüm Doğan Faralyalı is the founder and spokesperson of the "Common Values Movement" in Turkey.

== Memberships ==
- Member, B for Good Leaders
- Regular participant, World Economic Forum (WEF)
- Member, Business and Sustainable Development Commission (BSDC) established within the World Economic Forum
- Trustee member, World Wide Fund for Nature (WWF)
- Member, Turkish Industry and Business Association (TÜSİAD)
- Member, Global Relations Forum (GRF)
