= E2 (TV channel) =

e2
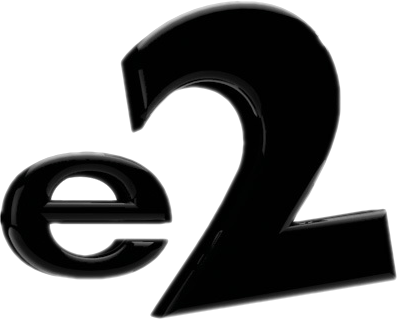
- Country: Turkey
- Broadcast area: Turkey

Programming
- Languages: Turkish, English
- Picture format: 16:9 (576i, SDTV); 16:9 (1080i, HDTV)

Ownership
- Owner: Doğuş Holding
- Sister channels: CNBC-e; Kral TV; NTV; NTV Spor; Star TV

History
- Launched: 3 December 2006; 19 years ago (Test broadcasting); 15 January 2007; 19 years ago (Regular broadcasting)
- Closed: 31 January 2016; 10 years ago

Links
- Website: www.e2.tv.tr

Availability

Streaming media
- tvyo: http://www.tvyo.com/canli-tv/e2

e2 was a Turkish television channel that often broadcasts American series. Owned by the Doğuş Group, it launched on January 15, 2007. The channel closed on January 31, 2016 when the rights to air its series expired; these moved to TLC which had taken over sister channel CNBC-e a few months earlier.

== Logos ==
2006-2011

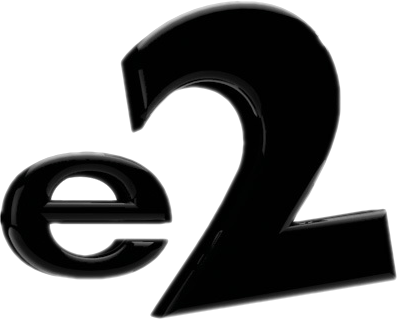
2011-2016

== Entertainment programmes ==
The following is an incomplete list of shows which have aired throughout the existence of e2:

- 24
- American Idol
- Battlestar Galactica
- Bored to Death
- Breaking Bad
- Chuck
- Cold Case
- Come Fly with Me
- Conan
- CSI: NY
- Desperate Housewives
- Dexter
- Dirt rerun
- Doctor Who rerun
- Eastbound & Down
- Family Guy
- Five Days
- Footballers' Wives
- Gossip Girl rerun
- Hollyoaks
- How I Met Your Mother
- Hung
- It's Always Sunny in Philadelphia rerun
- Late Night with Jimmy Fallon
- Later... with Jools Holland
- Little Britain USA
- Lucky Louie
- Mad Men rerun
- Married... with Children
- Martha Stewart Show rerun
- Masters of Horror
- Masters of Science Fiction
- Merlin
- Mongrels
- Nightmares and Dreamscapes: From the Stories of Stephen King
- Nip/Tuck
- Poker After Dark
- Prison Break
- Rachael Ray Show rerun
- Smallville
- South Park
- The Closer
- The Daily Show with Jon Stewart: Global Edition
- The Ellen DeGeneres Show
- The New Adventures of Old Christine
- The O.C.
- The Pacific
- The Sarah Silverman Program rerun
- The Simpsons
- The Sopranos
- The Tonight Show with Jay Leno
- The Tudors
- Treme
- Two and a Half Men
- Winners & Losers
- Without a Trace
- Women's Murder Club
- Workaholics
- The Big Bang Theory rerun
- A Young Doctor's Notebook (TV series) rerun
- Hannibal (TV series) rerun
- Vikings (2013 TV series) rerun
- Parade's End (TV series)
