= Vuslat Doğan Sabancı =

Turkish businesswoman (born 1971)

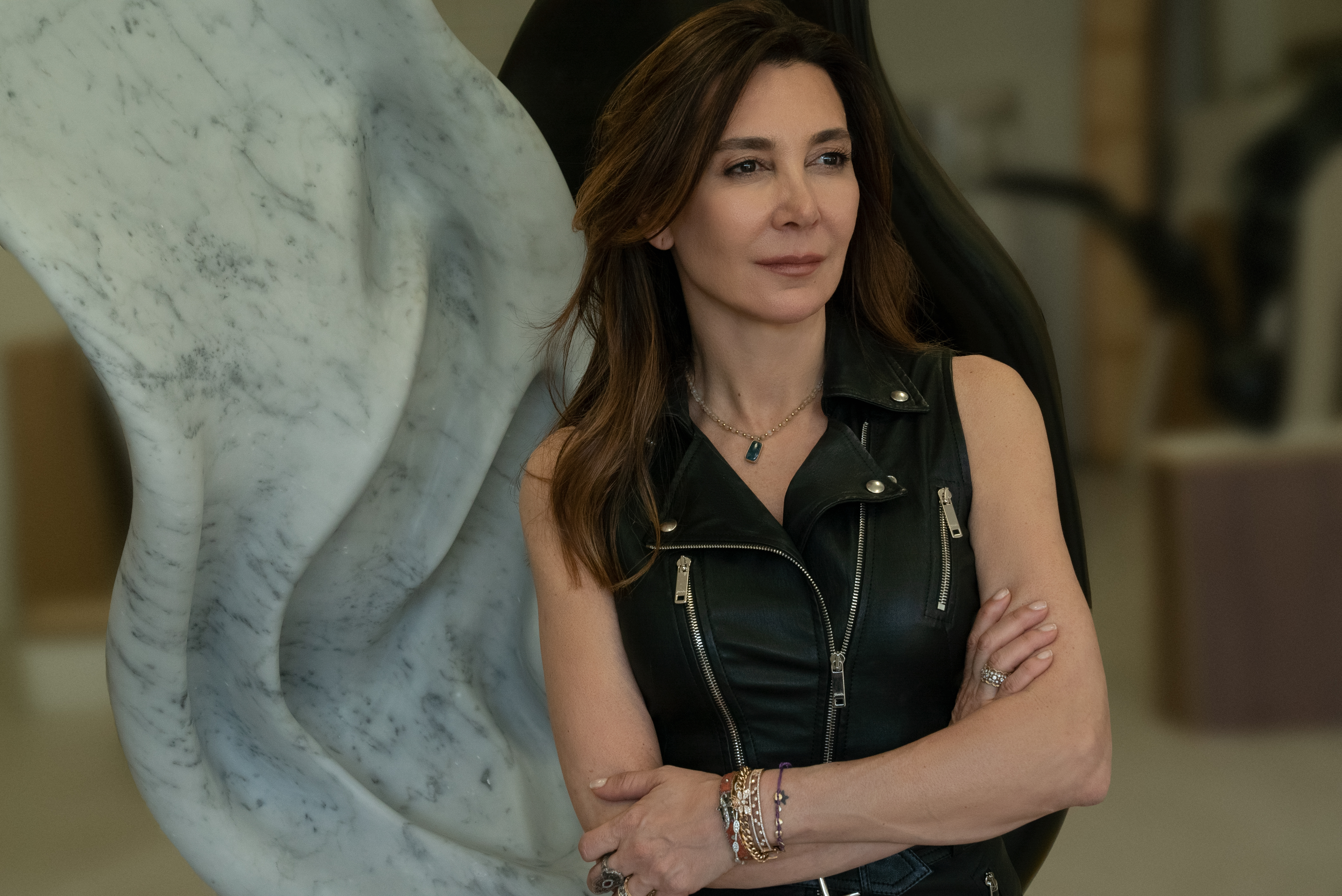
- 2011
- Born: January 16, 1971 (age 55); Istanbul, Turkey
- Education: Bilkent University (BS); Columbia University (MA)
- Occupations: Artist; Philanthropist; Entrepreneur
- Spouse: Ali İsmail Sabancı
- Children: 2
- Parent(s): Aydın Doğan; Sema Doğan
- Relatives: Hanzade Doğan Boyner (sister); Begüm Doğan Faralyalı (sister); Arzuhan Doğan Yalçındağ (sister)
- Website: https://vuslat.art https://vuslafoundation.org

Vuslat Doğan Sabancı (born 16 January 1971 in İstanbul, Turkey) is a former publisher of the Hürriyet daily newspaper. She is the vice chair of the Aydın Doğan Foundation and a board member of Doğan Holding and Hepsiburada. Sabancı is also the founder of the Vuslat Foundation, established in 2020.

== Biography and education ==
Born in 1971 in Istanbul, Turkey, Sabancı is the second daughter of Aydın Doğan and Sema Doğan. Her father is a business magnate, entrepreneur, philanthropist, and investor who founded Doğan Holding, one of Turkey's largest conglomerates. Her mother is a former Board Member at Doğan Group of Companies. Her sisters are Hanzade Doğan, Begüm Doğan Faralyalı and Arzuhan Doğan Yalçındağ.

After graduating from Bilkent University’s Department of Economics, she completed her master's degree in International Media and Communication at Columbia University in New York.

== Career ==
Sabancı is a multidisciplinary artist whose practice encompasses drawing, sculpture, installation, and storytelling. She also is the founder of the Vuslat Foundation. Sabancı worked at the Hürriyet Newspaper Group for 22 years — as CEO from 2004 to 2008, and as Chairwoman of the Board from 2008 to 2018. She stepped down from her role in 2018 following the Doğan Family’s withdrawal from all media-related activities. Prior to joining Hürriyet, she worked at The New York Times and The Wall Street Journal.

=== Hürriyet ===
Sabancı led a substantial digital transformation at Hürriyet. Under her leadership, one of every two people in Turkey engaged with Hürriyet’s digital content.

Sabancı also transformed Hürriyet from a solely Turkish paper into an international publication through her acquisition of Trader Media East (TME) in 2007. It was the largest ever foreign procurement executed by a Turkish company.

As a lifetime honorary board member of the International Press Institute (IPI) and CEO of Hürriyet Media Group, Sabancı attended a hearing in Khartoum, Sudan, to support Lubna Hussein, who, along with several other women, had been sentenced to 40 lashes for wearing trousers. After the hearing, she expressed her support for Hussein as both a women's rights defender and a journalist

Sabancı, who has extensively worked to support gender equality, delivered a speech titled “Women and Media: Gender Equality” at Columbia University's School of International and Public Affairs (SIPA) on January 28, 2013.

Sabancı played an important role in the establishment of the Editorial Principles Board in 2013, a first of its kind in Turkey, which oversees journalistic principles such as “peace journalism”, “hate speech”, “women and children-oriented (biased) view”, as well as professional ethical rules such as not allowing press trips to be used for advertisements, not allowing those covering the economy and stock market to engage in stock exchange transactions, and not allowing journalists to engage in other commercial activities.

In 2013, she played a crucial role in establishing Turkey’s first Editorial Principles Board, overseeing journalistic guidelines on peace journalism, hate speech, and issues affecting women and children. The board also set professional standards, such as prohibiting press trips for advertising, barring journalists who cover the economy from stock trading, and preventing reporters from engaging in commercial activities.

In 2015, while Sabancı was CEO, Hürriyet newspaper was targeted in a series of attacks on opposition newspapers. The paper was attacked both on social media by President Recep Tayyip Erdoğan, and by a physical mob that attempted to storm Hürriyet’s headquarters on September 17. These attacks occurred amid a crackdown on the Turkish press.

In April 2016, at the Women in the World Summit (WITW), she made a speech as the guest of honour at the gala dinner of the meeting.

In February 2017, at the Columbia University World Leader Forum, she gave a speech on ‘Fostering a Better Conversation and Understanding of Islam: The Vital Role of Media’ together with Lee Bollinger.

In October 2017, in the United States, the Atlantic Council organized a conference entitled “Islamophobia: Dispelling Myths and Promoting Better Dialogue.” Sabancı delivered a keynote address on the panel’s theme, criticizing Islamophobia

At Hürriyet, she worked on human rights, with a particular focus on gender equality issues. In 2004, she launched Turkey’s first “End Domestic Violence” movement. She also initiated a widespread training program for imams and police forces on domestic violence.

== Art career ==
Sabancı is a self-taught contemporary artist. An activist, civil society leader and former newspaper publisher, Vuslat has spent most of her life working to make an impact on gender equality, domestic violence and freedom of expression.

Sabancı is a multidisciplinary artist whose practice spans drawing, sculpture, ceramics, and installations. Her works frequently delve into themes such as trust, interconnectedness, memory, and collective consciousness. Drawing inspiration from mythological narratives, nature-culture dynamics, and philosophical discourses, Sabancı’s art embodies a rich interplay of ideas and mediums. One of her significant projects, titled Emanet, reflects deeply on values such as trust, care, and guardianship. This body of work serves as a meditation on ancient traditions, spiritual practices, healing, and the act of remembering.

After almost two decades of making art privately, her first exhibition took place in May 2022, “Silence”, curated by Chus Martinez at Pi Artworks Gallery in London, England. In June 2023, her first institutional show "Emanet" which was curated by Chus Martínez, was held at the Baksı Museum in Bayburt in the north eastern side of Turkey. Her third solo exhibition was in May 2024 at MSGSU Tophane-i Amire Five Domes Hall in Istanbul, curated by Ebru Yetişkin. In 2025, her second institutional solo show took place at Troy Museum in Çanakkale, Turkey.

As of 2024, Sabancı is pursuing a Master of Fine Arts degree at Otis College of Art and Design in Los Angeles, USA.

== Philanthropy ==
A law was enacted on domestic violence following an eight-year effort on her part through the “No More Domestic Violence” campaign she has initiated while she was the chief executive officer of Hürriyet.

Carrying out activities on domestic violence, Sabancı pioneered the establishment of the ‘24/7 Domestic Violence Hotline’ on October 15, 2007, for emergency support on domestic violence. European Union has also allocated funds for this social responsibility project. It was stated that more than 10,000 women were helped by this line in the first year. In 2022, with technical and financial support of the United Nations Population Fund (UNPF), more than 28,000 call records were reviewed and analyzed.

Sabancı also helped establish a platform to gather all NGOs formed around issues concerning women and function as a pressure lobby to ensure more women could be voted into the Parliament, prior to the General Elections in 2010. As a consequence of this effort, the number of female MPs rose to 78 after the 2011 elections, from 48.

In 2020, Sabancı founded the Vuslat Foundation, a philanthropic organization dedicated to raising awareness and promoting the practice of "Generous Listening," defined as "hearing beyond words with both the heart and the mind." She established the Vuslat Foundation with a large group of advisors from academia, opinion leaders, and philanthropists, including Zainab Salbi, Anna Maria Corazza Bildt, Irina Bokova, Kai Deikmann, Peggy Dulany, Jochen Zeitz, and Hashim Sarkis. The Foundation made its debut at the 17th Venice Architecture Biennale, aligning its work with the event’s overarching theme, "How will we live together?" This included the presentation of The Listener, an installation by Italian artist Giuseppe Penone, and a series of public programs, including a symposium exploring the same theme. The Foundation collaborates with academia, civil society, artists, and businesses to develop knowledge, research, methodologies, and tools that further the concept of Generous Listening. Through these efforts, it seeks to foster deeper connections and understanding across diverse sectors.

One of the key initiatives of the Vuslat Foundation is the "Generous Listening Emotional Support Groups," which was launched in response to the 2023 Kahramanmaraş and Hatay earthquakes to provide social and emotional support for women affected by the disaster. The program is focused on reducing loneliness, promoting a sense of belonging, building resilience and contributing to community rebuilding efforts. Additionally, the Vuslat Foundation aligns its mission with the Wellbeing Summit, working to raise awareness and inspire action around the principles of generous listening. Vuslat has further advocated for the Foundation's mission through articles on platforms such as the World Economic Forum and Forbes, emphasizing the importance of generous listening in addressing global challenges.

Generous listening is the practice of listening with openness, empathy, and courage to oneself, others, and the nature. It goes beyond merely hearing words, engaging both the heart and the mind to foster understanding, trust, and meaningful connections. Vuslat Foundation seeks to embed this transformative skill across diverse areas of life by developing tools, generating awareness, and advancing academic research through its collaboration with the Generous Listening and Dialogue Initiative (GLADI) at Tufts University.

=== Generous Listening and Dialogue Initiative ===
Vuslat Foundation in collaboration with the Tufts University, established the Generous Listening and Dialogue Initiative (GLADI) at the Tisch College of Civic Life. GLADI is dedicated to promoting authentic connections —within oneself, with others, and with the natural world— through the practice of generous listening. The initiative focuses on conducting research, developing courses and curricula, and establishing generous listening as an academic discipline. Through these efforts, GLADI aims to deepen both the understanding and application of generous listening as a transformative tool for fostering dialogue and connection across diverse communities. Many symposia have been organised around his principle.
