= Radio Impuls =

- Cluj-Napoca, Romania; Romania
- Frequency: 101.5 MHz (FM)

Programming
- Language: Romanian

Ownership
- Owner: Doğan Holding

Links
- Website: radioimpuls.ro

Radio Impuls is a Top40/hit radio station broadcasting in Cluj-Napoca, Romania. It is owned by Turkish conglomerate Doğan Holding, which also owns the television channel Kanal D.
