= Ahmet Yeşiltepe =

Turkish journalist, radio host, and television presenter

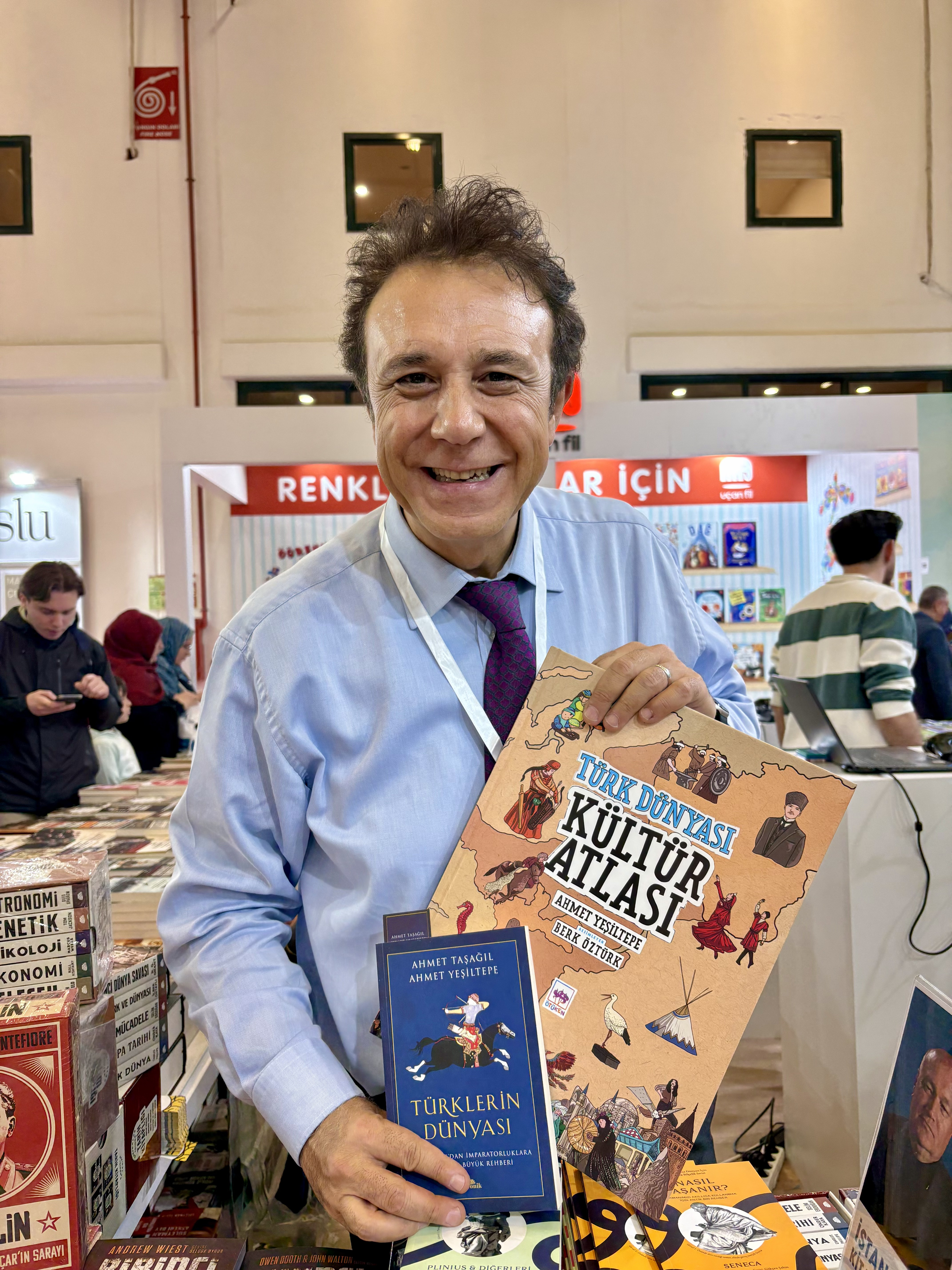
- Born: March 1968 (age 58); Turkey
- Education: Anadolu University (Cinema and Television)
- Occupations: Journalist, radio host, television presenter
- Years active: 2004-present
- Awards: 28th Sedat Simavi Awards by Turkish Journalists' Association(2004) Successful Journalist by Contemporary Journalists Association(2006) Ismail Gasprinsky Media Award by the International Turkic Academy (TWESCO) in Kazakhstan

Ahmet Yeşiltepe (born March 1968) is a Turkish journalist, radio host, and television presenter.

He reported on many international events such as the Bosnian War, Kosovo War, and the September 11 attacks. He worked as a correspondent for the NTV television channel, presenting various news programs including the "Main News" program. Besides journalism, he has also produced and hosted documentary programs focusing on history and culture, especially on topics related to Central Asia and the origins of Turkic people.

== Early life ==
Yeşiltepe was born in 1968. He studied Cinema and Television at Anadolu University. He began his television reporting career at TRT in 1992, covering various international events, including the Bosnian War.

After returning to Turkey from Bosnia, he received a scholarship to study media marketing in London and later in New York. During his studies abroad, he continued his career in journalism. He served as the New York City and Washington, DC correspondent for TRT for two years. In 1997, he established NTV's New York bureau and served in that position for seven years.

== Career ==
Since 2004, Yeşiltepe has been involved in producing and presenting various news programs, including the "Main News" program on NTV. He has also held positions such as Radio General Broadcast Coordinator at the Doğuş Media Group and General Director of NTVMSNBC. As of 2015, he serves as the Coordinator of External Relations and News at the Doğuş Media Group.

In the joint radio program Babil Kulesi, broadcast on NTV Radio, historical events and significant figures are discussed, along with the evolution of musical trends from their origins to the present day. Due to this program, Özgünay Ünal was recognized for her commendable work alongside the 28th Sedat Simavi Awards by the Selection Committee of the Turkish Journalists' Association in 2004. In 2006, the same program was honored in the Radio category at the Contemporary Journalists Association's Awards for Successful Journalists.

Yeşiltepe has a keen interest in history, art history, and archaeology, which is reflected in the documentary programs he has produced and hosted for NTV.

In addition to his television work, Yeşiltepe has also been a member of the editorial board of NTV History magazine and has written research articles. His work was recognized with the Ismail Gasprinsky Media Award by the International Turkic Academy (TWESCO) in Kazakhstan.
