= Seda Domaniç =

Turkish fashion writer (born 1975)

- Born: 1975 (age 50–51); Turkey
- Education: Johns Hopkins University; Sabancı University
- Occupation: fashion writer
- Known for: Editor-in-Chief of Vogue Turkey

Seda Domaniç (born 1975) is the editor-in-chief of Vogue Turkey. She is also the president of Doğuş Media Group's publishing division.

== Education ==
Seda Domaniç graduated magna cum laude ("Highest Honor") from the Georgetown University School of Foreign Service in 1997, after which she received her M.A. degree from Johns Hopkins University SAIS in Bologna. She was awarded a Bologna Center Fellowship in 1998–1999. Upon her return to Turkey she achieved her PhD degree in political science at Sabancı University.

== Career ==
Seda Domaniç began her professional career as a journalist and a reporter at CNN television in Washington, then in Milan with Dow Jones Newswires. Moving back to Turkey, she continued her professional career in CNN Türk television in Istanbul. Following this period, she worked as a communications consultant with Tribeca Communications Consultancy for the European Commission, Ministry of Tourism and various private companies.

In 2002, she started working as a director in the European Union Information Center established in Istanbul. Her post had the objective to improve public awareness of the European Union and Turkey's accession process.

Domaniç then became the secretary general in the Centre for Economics and Foreign Policy Studies (EDAM) in 2004. She directed EDAM's team of researchers in cooperation with board members and conducted research projects while creating policies on various topics related to Turkish foreign and economic policy.

She joined Doğuş Group, one of Turkey's leading conglomerates, as the external affairs manager in 2006. In 2008, she became the business development and strategic planning director of Doğuş Media Group. Domaniç initiated partnerships and contributed to the brand development of media licensed through CNBC, Condé Nast, Virgin, Billboard, National Geographic, CurtCo Media, Dennis Publishing, Haymarket, IPC Media, Ink Publishing and MSNBC.

Along with her position in Dogus Media Group, she hosted her own TV programme named Business Turkey on CNBC Europe/World television.

Since 2009, Seda Domaniç has been the editor-in-chief of Vogue Turkey, where she oversees management of online and offline brand assets of the company, including the printed monthly magazine, vogue.com, iPad and Android editions, events and social media (with over 1 million followers); managing creative direction and monitoring the editorial content of the magazine. She also provides consultancy in fashion and luxury brands in line with Vogue vision while initiating establishments of joint projects beneficial to both parties.

In 2013 she was promoted to the presidency of DMG's Publishing Group. She is currently directing a team of 92 employees in overall operations, sales, advertising, marketing and editorial teams of Dogus Group magazines and NTV Publications.

== Personal interests ==
Apart from her native tongue, Turkish, she speaks English, French, and Italian, and is currently learning Spanish. She loves travelling and is specifically drawn to the Southern Hemisphere. Domaniç is a certified yoga instructor.
