= NTV Spor =

- Country: Turkey
- Broadcast area: Turkey; Azerbaijan
- Affiliates: NTV Spor Radyo
- Headquarters: Istanbul

Programming
- Language: Turkish
- Picture format: 576i (16:9 SDTV); 1080i (HDTV)

Ownership
- Owner: Doğuş Media Group
- Sister channels: CNBC-e e2 Kral TV; NTV; Star TV

History
- Launched: 2006 (web portal); 17 March 2008; 17 years ago (TV channel)
- Closed: 17 March 2018; 7 years ago (cease of TV broadcasting)
- Replaced by: DMAX

Links
- Website: ntvspor.net

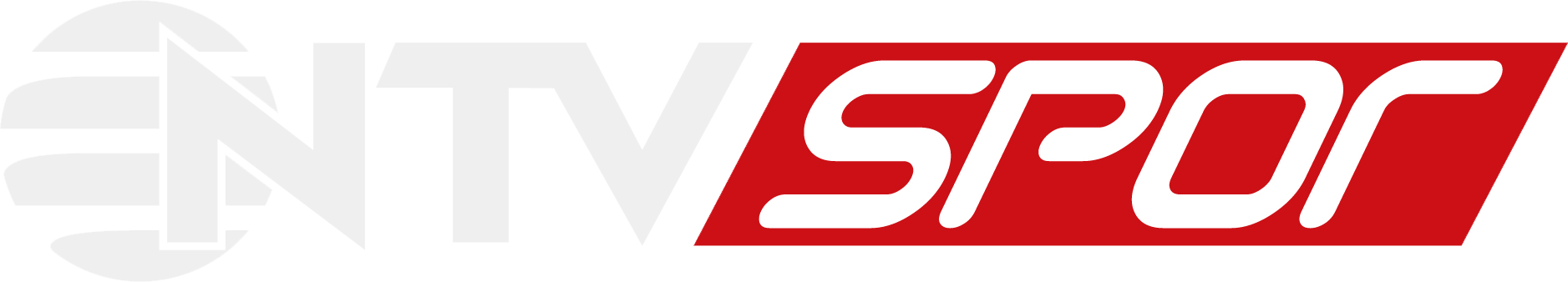
Former logo

NTV Spor is a Turkish online sports platform. NTV Spor used to be a nationwide TV channel between 2008 and 2018. As of April 2021, NTV Spor continues to produce content via their website and YouTube channel.

NTV Spor used to hold broadcasting rights of varied sports events including La Liga, NBA, FA Cup, Wimbledon, EuroBasket, UEFA Euros and FIFA World Cup qualifying phase.

== History ==
NTV Spor, a subsidiary of Doğuş Media Group, was launched as a web portal in June 2006. NTV Spor TV channel was launched on 17 March 2008. The channel started nationwide terrestrial broadcasting on 19 November 2008. In same year, they acquired broadcasting rights of Spanish La Liga, Italian Serie A, Argentine Primera División, NBA and NASCAR.

In 2010, NTV Spor started to air the 2010–11 season of World Series of Boxing of AIBA, in which a Turkish boxing team named "Istanbulls" also competed. On 24 June 2011, the channel started HD broadcasting.

Following the strategic cooperation agreement between Doğuş Media Group and Discovery Communications signed in 2015, Discovery Communications approached to acquire NTV Spor from Doğuş Media Group, in 2018. Parties agreed terms for the transaction, which was completed in 31 January 2018. On 6 March 2018, it was announced that the channel will cease their broadcasting and it will be replaced by DMAX.

The take-over took place at 22:30 local time, right after the credits of "%100 Futbol", the weekly football punditry feature of the channel, which was aired after The Intercontinental Derby game played on 17 March 2018.
