= Jazz in Turkey =

- Film poster
- Directed by: Batu Akyol
- Written by: Batu Akyol
- Produced by: Loyka Productions
- Release date: July 2013 (Istanbul Jazz Festival)
- Running time: 100 minutes
- Country: Turkey
- Language: Turkish-English

Jazz in Turkey is a 2013 documentary directed by Batu Akyol. The film explores the condition, evolution, and interaction of Turkish jazz music and its musicians, in parallel to Turkish history.

Filming for the documentary commenced in 2011, featuring interviews with more than 50 musicians, producers and academians including Terence Blanchard, İlhan Erşahin, Herbie Hancock and Cüneyt Sermet. The film premiered in Turkey on July 14, 2013.

== Interviewees ==
Hakan Atala, Murat Beşer, Terence Blanchard, Sadettin Davran, Craig Dicker, Baki Duyarlar, Dr. JB Days, İlhan Erşahin, Feridun Ertaşkan, Muvaffak Falay,
Emin Fındıkoğlu, Önder Focan, Zuhal Focan, Bozkurt İlham Gencer, Kerem Görsev, Selen Gülün, Ediz Hafızoğlu, Herbie Hancock, Emre Kartari, Dost Kip, Can Kozlu, Joe Mardin,
Güngör Mimaroğlu, T.S Monk, Dan Morgenstern, Pelin Opcin, Tuna Ötenel, Ali Perret, Mike Ringquist, Mehmet Ali Sanlıkol, Cüneyt Sermet, Çağrı Sertel, Wayne Shorter, Selçuk Sun,
Görgün Taner, Orhan Tekelioğlu, Okay Temiz, Sabri Tuluğ Tırpan, Hülya Tunçağ, Şenova Ülker, Nail Yavuzoğlu, Ayşegül Yeşilnil, Nezih Yeşilnil, Ahmet Yeşiltepe
