= Doğuş Media Group =

Turkish media conglomerate

- Industry: Television, Radio, Digital Platform, Internet, Newspaper
- Headquarters: Büyükdere Avenue, Maslak, Büyükdere, Sarıyer, Istanbul
- Area served: Turkey
- Key people: Ayhan Şahenk, Ferit Şahenk
- Website: www.dogusyayingrubu.com

Doğuş Media Group (Doğuş Yayın Grubu) is a Turkish media conglomerate, part of the Doğuş Group conglomerate. Its properties include the news channel NTV (since 1999) the music channel Kral TV (since 2008) the entertainment channel Star TV (since 2011).

From 2009 to 2013, it published history magazine NTV Tarih.

== Properties ==
=== Television ===
- 1999–: NTV (acquired from Nergis Grubu)
- 2008–: Kral TV (acquired from TMSF)
- 2011–: Euro Star (acquired from Doğan Media Group)
- 2011–: Kral Pop TV
- 2011–: Star TV (acquired from Doğan Media Group)

=== Radio ===
- 2000–2016, 2021–: Radyo Eksen (Sold to Pozitif Group, later bought it back.)
- 2000–: NTV Radyo
- 2008–: Kral FM (acquired from TMSF)
- 2009–2016, 2021–: Radyo Voyage (Sold to Pozitif Group, later bought it back.)
- 2011–: Kral Pop Radyo

=== Internet ===
- ntv.com.tr
- ntvspor.net
- puhutv.com
- startv.com.tr
- eurostartv.com.tr
- kralmuzik.com.tr

== Old properties ==
=== Television ===
- 1993–1994: Kanal D (sold to Doğan Media Group)
- 1999–2000: Kanal E
- 2000–2015: CNBC-e (sold to Discovery Communications)
- 2004–2017: NTV Avrupa
- 2004–2011: NBA TV (sold to Doğan Media Group)
- 2007–2016: e2
- 2008–2018: NTV Spor (sold to Discovery Communications)
- 2008–2011: Kral Avrupa
- 2011: Kral İlaç Gibi TV
- 2011–2013: HDe
- 2012–2013: Kral Pop Avrupa (Transferred the frequency to Kral World TV.)

=== Radio ===
- 1999–2000: Radyo Pop (Transferred the frequency to NTV Radyo.)
- 2003–2011: Radyo N101
- 2006–2008: Rokket FM
- 2007–2015: Capital Radio (Transferred the frequency to Kral World Radio.)
- 2008–2013: Virgin Radio
- 2008–2009: Nostalji Türk
- 2009–2014: NTV Spor Radyo
- 2010–2011: Radyo5 (acquired from TMSF)
- 2010–2016: Radyo Babylon
- 2013–2016: Maximusic! 99.4
- 2014–2020: Kral World Radio

=== Magazines ===
- NTV Mag
- National Geographic Türkiye
- National Geographic Kids
- Robb Report
- Vogue Türkiye
- GQ Türkiye
- Conde Nast Traveller
- Popüler Tarih
- Slam Dergi
- CNBC-e Dergi
- CNBC-e Business
- Billboard
- NTV Tarih
- NTV Bilim
- Conde Nast Traveller
- Glamour Türkiye
- N-Style
- L’officel Türkiye

=== Internet ===
- ntvpara.com
- ntvhava.com
- tvyo.com
- cnbce.tv
- cnbce.com
- e2.tv.tr
