= Hanzade Doğan Boyner =

Turkish businesswoman, philanthropist (born 1972)

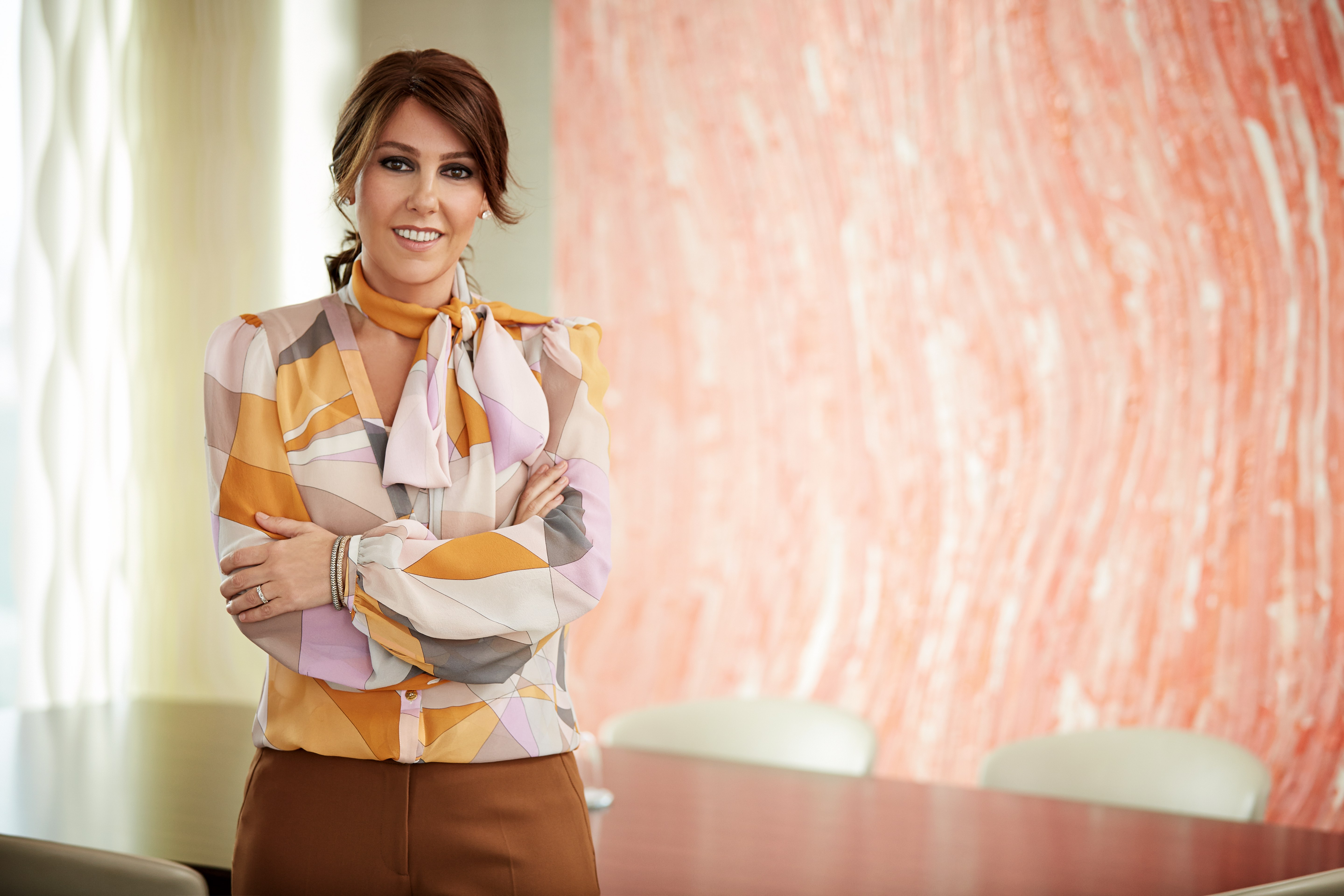
- Born: Hanzade Doğan; 1972 (age 53–54); Istanbul, Turkey
- Education: Lycée Français Saint-Michel
- Alma mater: London School of Economics; Columbia University
- Occupation: Businesswoman
- Organization(s): Doğan Holding; Doğan Media Group; Hepsiburada.com; Doğan Online; Aydın Doğan Foundation
- Spouse: Osman Boyner (m. 2007)
- Children: 2
- Parent(s): Aydın Doğan; Sema Doğan

Hanzade Doğan Boyner (born 1972) is a Turkish businesswoman, philanthropist, entrepreneur and e-commerce pioneer. She is the founding chairwoman of Doğan Online Group Companies, the largest online corporation in Eastern Europe, the Middle East, and Africa, and is the founder and chairperson of the e-commerce platform Hepsiburada, often called “The Amazon of the East". In July 2019, Forbes called her “one of the most successful women tech entrepreneurs in the world,” and Fortune Turkey has credited her with leading the country’s digital transformation.

Boyner is chairwoman of Doğan Holding, one of Turkey’s largest conglomerates operating in the energy, media, industry, trade, insurance, and tourism industries. She was chairperson of the Doğan Media Group, which includes Posta, one of Turkey's highest-selling daily newspapers. She also was the chairperson of Petrol Ofisi.

A frequent speaker at international fora, Boyner presented at the 2020 World Economic Forum (WEF) annual meeting in Davos, Switzerland, and at the 2019 Fortune Global Forum in Paris, France. She is a founding member and vice chairwoman of the Global Relations Forum (GRF), and is on the Brookings Institution Board of Trustees and the Board of Overseers at Columbia University’s Columbia Business School.

== Early life ==
Born in 1972 in Istanbul, Turkey, Hanzade Doğan Boyner is the third daughter of Aydın Doğan and Sema Doğan. Her father is a Turkish billionaire businessman who founded Doğan Holding, one of Turkey's largest conglomerates. Her mother is a former Board Member at Dogan Sirketler Grubu Holdings.

Boyner attended high school at Lycée Français Saint Michel in Istanbul. She obtained a bachelor's degree from the London School of Economics and a master's degree in business administration from Columbia University in New York City.

== Business career ==
After graduating from the London School of Economics, Boyner commenced her professional career at Goldman Sachs London’s Chartered Market Technician (CMT) department as a financial analyst.

After working briefly for the family business, Boyner launched Doğan Online, the country’s leading internet holding company, and founded tech companies Hepsiburada in 2001 and Nesine in 2006.

=== Hepsiburada ===
Credited by Fortune Turkey with leading the country’s digital transformation, Hanzade Doğan Boyner founded Hepsiburada in 2000, and it is now known as "the Amazon of the East."

Under Boyner’s leadership, the Hepsiburada Group operates the leading e-commerce platform in Turkey and the greater region. Hepsiburada’s fully integrated business ecosystem includes: Hepsijet, a last-mile delivery service; Hepsipay, an online licensed payment platform, and Hepsiexpress, offering everything from groceries to laptops.

=== Nesine ===
Founded in 2006, Nesine is the leading sports betting company in Turkey and the legal e-ticket dealer for Turkey’s National Lottery Administration. Nesine offers daily horse racing bulletins, statistics and race results; broadcasts Iddaa games online and on mobile platforms; and provides a coupon-sharing platform for Iddaa.

== Philanthropy ==
In 2017, Boyner launched the Women’s Empowerment through Technology program, directly supporting more than 5,000 women entrepreneurs in 72 cities across Turkey. The program offers women entrepreneurs the opportunity to open virtual stores at no cost on Hepsiburada’s website and provides supports through: on-site e-commerce trainings, up to 75% discount on commission fees, free cargo shipping for six months, higher advertising visibility on Hepsiburada's website, SEO and SEM optimizations, AdWords and content support, free studio usage for photo shootings, operations and marketing support, and access to a direct special customer service hotline for assistance.

As President of the Aydın Doğan Foundation, Boyner oversees the Doğan Group's philanthropic activities and invests deeply in the education and empowerment of girls and women in Turkey. She launched the "Dad, Send Me to School" campaign, which aims to remove economic and cultural barriers to education for girls and young women nationwide. The campaign has granted more than 50,000 scholarships and built 33 girls' dormitories across the country, leading to a significant increase in the enrollment of school-age girls.

Boyner has been voted the 'Most Successful Woman in Business' in Turkey on several occasions, by the Gazi University Faculty of Economics and Administrative Sciences, Boğaziçi University, Istanbul Technical University and Yıldız Technical University. In 2019, she was considered one of the most successful women in tech global entrepreneurs.

== Personal life ==
In April 2007, she married Turkish businessman Osman Boyner, CEO of Boyner Sanayi A.Ş. She is the mother of two daughters.
