= Lycée Français Saint-Michel =

International school in Istanbul, Turkey

Lycée Français Saint-Michel (English: Saint Michel French High School, Turkish: Aziz Mikâel Fransız Lisesi) is an international French school located in Istanbul. It is one of the three Lasallian schools in Turkey along with Lycée Saint-Joseph in Istanbul and Lycée Saint-Joseph in Izmir. The Agency for French Education Abroad (AEFE) does not include the school in its list of French international schools in Turkey (under "Turquie").

== History ==
=== Early development ===
In September 1886, the De La Salle Brothers established a school in Beyoğlu, near Galatasaray High School, replacing a school that had burned down in 1870. They named this new school Saint-Michel. In 1896, the Frères built a new school in Feriköy, north of the city, under the name Saint-Jean Chrysostome. The building served as a primary school, middle school, and provided basic commercial education. The school gained recognition and reached up to 180 students by 1912 but closed in 1914.

=== Re-establishment ===
In 1921, after World War I, a dynamic and active northerner named Frère Florin established a larger, more organized, and better-equipped school in place of Saint-Jean Chrysostome and named it Sainte-Jeanne D'Arc. After three years of education at this school, the students completed their studies at Saint-Michel College (in Beyoğlu) or Saint-Joseph College (in Kadıköy). They also had the option to continue at the commercial institute. This institute was initially housed within Saint-Joseph and later moved to Sainte-Jeanne d'Arc.

=== Modernisation ===
In 1936, a law was enacted prohibiting foreigners from opening schools in Turkey, resulting in the closure of all foreign schools. Saint-Michel College relocated from the bustling environment of Beyoğlu and settled in the buildings of Sainte-Jeanne d'Arc College in Bomonti. The merger of these two schools formed the present-day Saint-Michel High School. In 1956, for various reasons, the De La Salle Brothers closed the middle section of the school. The middle section was reopened in 1970, and female students were also admitted. Saint-Michel became the first French school in Istanbul to offer co-education. Since 1976, the De La Salle Brothers who were the founders have not been involved in the school administration.

== Notable alumni ==
- Arzuhan Doğan Yalçındağ, chairperson of Doğan Holding
- Hüseyin Yalın, singer and songwriter
- İshak Alaton, co-founder of Alarko Holding
- Leyla İpekçi, journalist and screenwriter
- Mario Levi, modern novelist
- Oya Aydoğan, actress
