= Backward Run =

- French title poster
- Turkish: Tornistan: Bir Ayçe Kartal filmi
- Directed by: Ayçe Kartal
- Release date: July 2013
- Running time: 3 minutes 59 seconds
- Country: Turkey

Backward Run (Turkish: Tornistan: Bir Ayçe Kartal filmi) is a 2013 Turkish animated short film written and directed by Ayçe Kartal.

== Plot ==
The film satirizes the press censorship during the Gezi Park protests that took place in Turkey during May–July 2013.

== See also ==
- Media censorship and disinformation during the Gezi Park protests in Turkey
