= Arzuhan Doğan Yalçındağ =

Turkish businesswoman (born 1965)

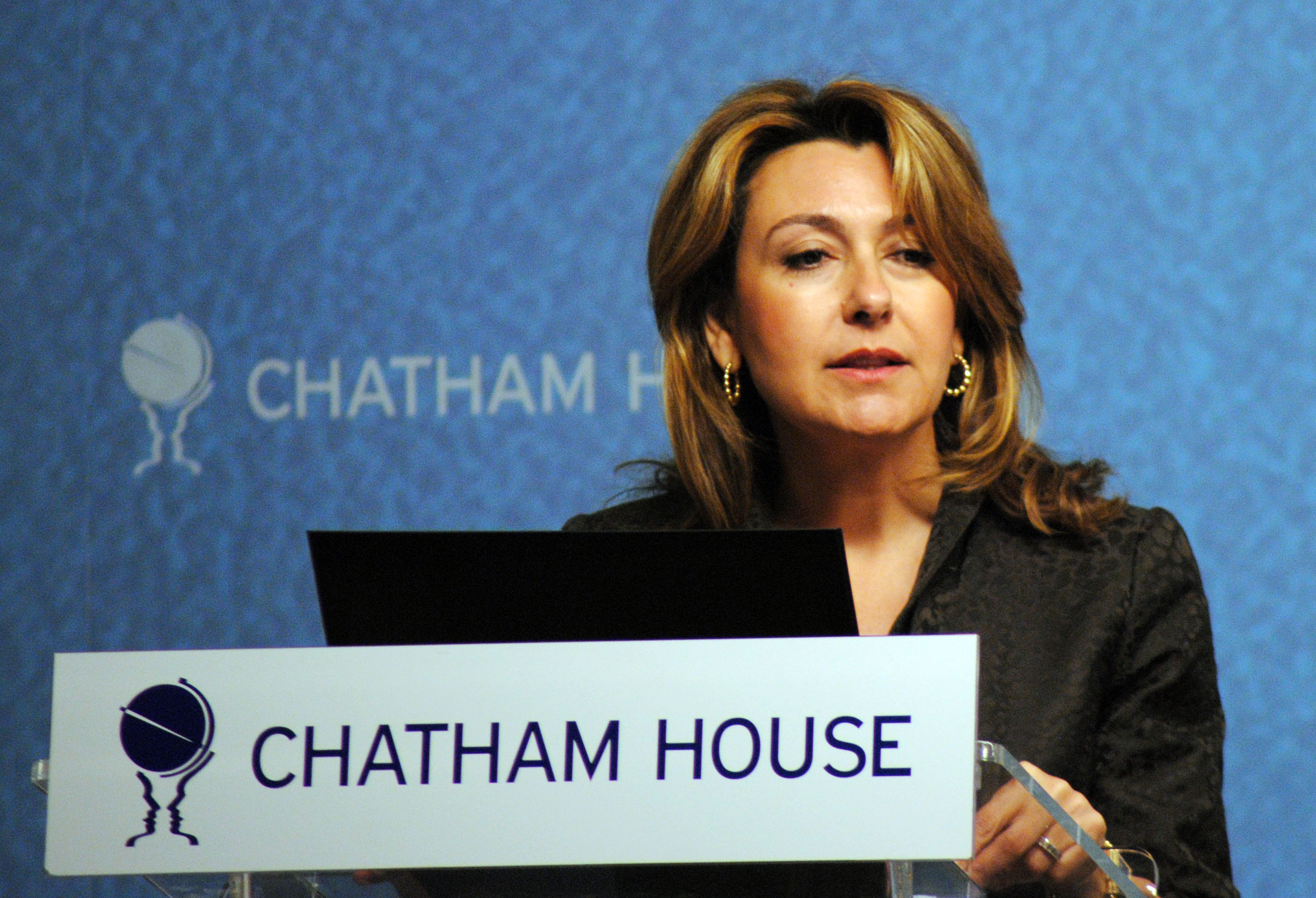
- Yalçındağ at Chatham House in 2013.
- Born: Arzuhan Doğan; 1965 (age 60–61)
- Education: Lycée Français Saint-Michel
- Alma mater: Boğaziçi University
- Occupation: Businesswoman
- Organization: Doğan Media Group
- Spouse: Mehmet Ali Yalçındağ
- Children: 2
- Parent(s): Aydın Doğan; Sema Doğan

Arzuhan Doğan Yalçındağ (born 1965) is a Turkish businesswoman and chairwoman of the Doğan Holding industrial conglomerate.

== Early life and education ==
She is the daughter of the Turkish media proprietor Aydın Doğan, who was chairman of Dogan Holding before she took over 1 January 2010. Between 2007 and 2010, she served as the first female chairperson of the Turkish Industrialists' and Businessmen's Association (TÜSİAD), the top association of businesspeople in Turkey.

Doğan finished high school at Lycée Français Saint Michel in Istanbul. She was educated in sociology at the Boğaziçi University earning a bachelor's degree. She went later to the United Kingdom to study business administration. She is married to businessman Mehmet Ali Yalçındağ.

== Career ==
Since 1996, she has been in the broadcast media business and has initiated a joint venture with AOL Time Warner in establishing CNN Türk. Prior to that, she served in the Milliyet Group, where she was responsible for finance, and worked in the establishment of Alternatif Bank, where she later became a board member. She established and managed the mail order company in MILPA CO in a joint venture with the German Quelle Company.

She is a board member of the Education Volunteers Foundation of Turkey (Turkish: Türkiye Eğitim Gönüllüleri Vakfı, TEGV), Turkish-American Businessmen's Association (TABA) Turkish Women Entrepreneurs Association (KAGİDER) and the Third Sector Foundation of Turkey (TÜSEV). Yalçındag is also the founding Director of the Women's Initiative for Turkey in the European Union and the founding board member of the AydIn Doğan Foundation.

Doğan is a member of the Board of Directors of the American Turkish Society. She was a member of the executive committee and head of the Social Affairs Committee of TÜSİAD before becoming the president.
