= Ali Sabancı =

Turkish businessman

Ali İsmail Sabancı (born May 5, 1969; Adana) is a Turkish businessperson and a third generation member of the Sabancı Family. He is the Chairperson of Esas Holding.

== Education ==
Ali Sabancı earned his M.B.A. degree with a major in International Finance from Columbia Business School and B.A. degree in Politics and Economics from Tufts University.

== Career ==
Ali Sabancı is the Chairperson of Esas Holding and Pegasus Airlines, vice chairperson of Mars Athletic and a board member of Ayakkabı Dünyası, which are part of the Esas Private Equity portfolio. He also serves on the board of Esas Properties.

Ali is one of the co-founders of Esas Social. In January 2020 his father Şevket Sabancı handed the chairmanship of Esas Holding to Ali Sabancı, with Emine Sabancı Kamışlı as vice-chair and H. Çağatay Özdoğru continuing as chief executive officer.

Ali is a member of the Turkish American Business Association and the Turkish Family Business Association. He is a member of Board of Trustees of Entrepreneurship Foundation and a founding member of GEN (Global Entrepreneurship Network ) Türkiye.

In 2018 he was awarded the Légion d'Honneur by the French government for his contributions to economic relations between Turkey and France.

== Personal life ==
Ali Sabancı is married to Vuslat Doğan Sabancı and has two sons, Emrecan Şevket Sabancı and Kaan Ali Sabancı.

== See also ==
- Pegasus Airlines
