= DMC =

DMC or dmc may refer to:

== Science and technology ==
- Data monitoring committee, for clinical trials
- Dimethyl carbonate, a chemical compound
- Dissimilar metal corrosion, an electrochemical process
- Double monocable, a type of ropeway technology
- Disaster Monitoring Constellation, a satellite constellation
  - DMC International Imaging, a British satellite operator

=== Computing ===
- Data Matrix Code, a laser etched square code used for marking products in the production area
- Diffusion Monte Carlo, a method
- Digital Media Controller, a category within the DLNA standard for finding content on digital media servers
- Discrete memoryless channel; see Channel capacity
- Dynamic Markov compression, an algorithm
- Dynamic Mesh Communication, a mesh-based intercom system developed for motorcycle communication

== Arts and entertainment ==
- Digital mixing console, used in audio mixing
- DMC (rapper) (Darryl McDaniels, born 1964), member of hip hop group Run–DMC
- DMC World DJ Championships, an international turntablism competition
- Devil May Cry, a Japanese video game series
  - Devil May Cry (video game), the first game in the series
  - DmC: Devil May Cry, a reboot commonly referred to as simply "DmC"
- Detroit Metal City, a manga franchise
- Dhammakaya Media Channel, a Thai television channel
- Deathmatch Classic, a Half-Life mod
- "DMC", a song by Romy on the album Mid Air

== Organizations ==
- Damak Multiple Campus, Jhapa, Nepal
- Davao Medical Center, a government hospital in Davao City, Philippines
- Dhaka Medical College, Bangladesh
- Diablos Motorcycle Club, an American outlaw motorcycle club
- Divisional Model College, Pakistan
- Deseret Management Corporation, an LDS Church company
- Destination management company, a professional travel services company with local knowledge
- Detroit Medical Center, Michigan, US
- DMC (company) (Dollfus-Mieg et Compagnie), a textile company in Mulhouse, France

=== Transportation ===
- DeLorean Motor Company, a former American automobile manufacturer (1975-1982)
- DeLorean Motor Company (Texas), a company founded in 1995 supplying parts and services to owners of DeLoreans
- Daelim Motor Company, a South Korean motorcycle, motorscooter and ATV manufacturer

== Other uses ==
- Drummond Money-Coutts (born 1986), English magician
- Detailed marks certificate, a detailed report of academic performance
- Digital Media City, Seoul, South Korea
- Domestic material consumption, a measurement of material used
- Dubai Maritime City, a multipurpose maritime zone in Dubai, United Arab Emirates
- Gavak language (ISO 639-3 code: dmc)

== See also ==
- DMC-College Foundation (DMC-CFI), Dipolog City, Philippines
