= Hepsiburada =

Turkish shopping website

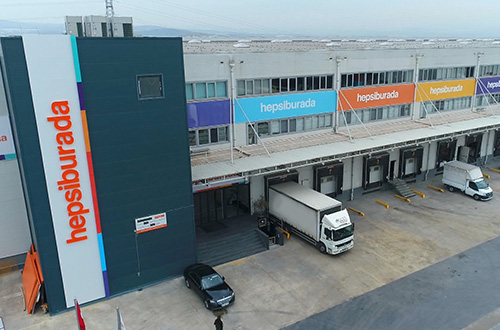
- Hepsiburada's Operation Centre
- Traded as: Nasdaq: HEPS
- Industry: E-commerce
- Headquarters: Istanbul, Turkey
- Key people: Hanzade Doğan Boyner(Founder & Chairwoman) Nilhan Onal Gökçetekin CEO
- Owner: Kaspi.kz; (2025–present)
- Website: Hepsiburada.com

Hepsiburada.com, (from Turkish hepsi burada, "all of it/everything is here") is an Istanbul-based retail shopping website that has been in operation since 2000.

Headquartered in Şişli, Istanbul, with an operations center in Gebze, Kocaeli, it is a pioneer of retail e-commerce in Turkey. Products sales in 30 categories. These include Electronics, Fashion, Home, Life, Stationery, Office.

== History ==
Originally launched as a direct selling 1P-based e-commerce platform, Hepsiburada managed its own inventory to deliver products directly to consumers. In 2015, the company went through a renewal process, gathering feedback from approximately 6 million individuals. This shift led to the adoption of an e-marketplace model, enabling various companies to open their own stores and directly deliver products to end-users. Consequently, it evolved into an e-commerce platform that integrates both 1P-based operations and an e-marketplace model.

Since July 1, 2021, it has been listed on the NASDAQ. It was first Turkish company to go public on the Nasdaq Stock Exchange.

Hanzade Doğan was the founder and chairwoman of the Board of Directors, while Nilhan Onal Gökçacetekin has been CEO since January 2023.

In its 2023 financial report, the company reported a total sales volume of 96.5 billion TRY, which adjusts to 116.5 billion TRY after accounting for inflation. This reflects a growth rate of 104 percent before inflation adjustments and 31 percent afterward. Hepsiburada boasts 12 million active customers and 101,500 active merchants. In 2022, the company reported a total sales volume amounting to 47.3 billion TRY.

Since its inception in 2017, the Technology Power for Women Entrepreneurs program has successfully integrated over 50,000 women entrepreneurs, nearly 250 women’s cooperatives and 30 civil society organizations into the marketplace.

On June 7, 2023, Hepsiburada entered into a sponsorship agreement with the Turkish Basketball Federation, becoming the main sponsor of both the Men's and Women’s National Basketball Teams for two years.

On January 29, 2025, it was reported that Kaspi.kz had completed the acquisition of a controlling stake in Hepsiburada.

== Timeline ==
- 2000: Hepsiburada commenced operations under of Doğan Online.
- 2006: Hepsiburada was recognized as the “Fastest-Growing E-Commerce Site” by the Deloitte Technology Fast 50 Survey.
- 2015: Hepsiburada launched its new business model, the Marketplace, allowing users to open a free store and market their own products.
- 2016: Hepsiburada launched Hepsipay, a 100-percent-owned venture, to facilitate online payment transactions.
- 2021: Hepsiburada became the first and only Turkish company to be listed on the NASDAQ Stock Exchange. Hepsiburada shares started trading on the NASDAQ stock exchange in the USA on July 1, 2021. The company launched the HepsiTürkiye’den Program, designed to deliver geographically marked and local products to consumers throughout Turkey.
- 2022: Hepsiburada signed the United Nations Global Compact, the world's largest voluntary corporate sustainability initiative. Hepsiburada supported the establishment of the first “E-Commerce Competence Center” at TÜBİTAK-BİLGEM Artificial Intelligence Institute, which was inaugurated as a part of Turkey’s National Artificial Intelligence Strategy.
- 2022: Hepsiburada partnered with the Turkish Patent and Trademark Office through the ‘HepsiTürkiye’den’ program to promote awareness of geographically marked products. This initiative aims to connect local entrepreneurs with the e-commerce sector and support their national and international marketing efforts.
- 2022: Hepsiburada launched Smart by MIMEX, Turkey’s first smart and cashless store that features a ‘buy and check out’ concept.
- 2023: Hepsiburada launched Hepsiburada Premium, the first membership-based loyalty program developed in Turkey. Murat Emirdağ, who had been CEO since 2019, was succeeded by Nilhan Onal Gökçetekin on January 1, 2023.
- 2025: On January 29, Hepsiburada was purchased by Kaspi.kz.

== Brands ==
- HepsiJet: a transportation company that operates across all 81 provinces of Turkey in the e-commerce sector.
- HepsiLojistik: a logistics company that provides services including stocking, addressing, packaging, shipping, invoicing, delivery, and returns for sales conducted on Hepsiburada and other e-commerce platforms.
- HepsiPay: a fintech company that provides users with a digital wallet, prepaid card, and offers payment gateway services to businesses.
- Hepsiburada Market: a delivery application that brings supermarket items such as food, water, and flowers directly to consumers.
- Hepsiburada Premium: a paid loyalty program.
- Hepsiburada Global: an export platform established for Hepsiburada and Hepsiburada sellers to sell products abroad.
