= NTV Tarih =

History magazine in Turkey (2009–2013)

- Frequency: Monthly
- Total circulation: 35,000 (2013)
- First issue: January 2009
- Final issue: 2013
- Company: Doğuş Media Group
- Country: Turkey
- Based in: Istanbul
- Language: Turkish
- Website: www.ntvtarih.com.tr
- ISSN: 1308-7878
- OCLC: 354466302

NTV Tarih (English: NTV History) was a monthly history magazine owned by Doğuş Media Group. It was in circulation between 2009 and 2013 and was headquartered in Istanbul, Turkey.

== History and profile ==
NTV Tarih was first published in February 2009. The founding editor-in-chief was Gürsel Göncü.

It was closed down in mid-2013 by its owner in response to the magazine's coverage of the 2013 protests in Turkey, with Doğuş refusing to distribute the final edition. The magazine's staff published the last edition online and sought to continue the magazine independently. The final edition was published by Metis Publications as a book under the title Gezi Direnişi in October 2013.
