= Ayhan Şahenk =

Turkish businessman

- Born: 11 June 1929; Niğde, Turkey
- Died: 3 April 2001 (aged 71); Istanbul, Turkey
- Resting place: Niğde, Turkey
- Education: Ankara University (LLB)
- Occupation: Founder of Doğuş Group
- Spouse: Deniz Şahenk
- Children: Ferit Şahenk; Filiz Şahenk

Ayhan Şahenk (June 11, 1929 in Niğde – 1 April 2001 in Istanbul) was a Turkish businessman. In 1951, while studying at Ankara University Law School, he established his company, which would later become the basis of Doğuş Holding, with a capital of 9,000 Turkish liras.

== Career ==
His company was awarded the tender for road, asphalt and sewerage works of the Grand National Assembly of Turkey. The first company in Turkey to be able to build dams has implemented 16 large and small dams and a total of 66 construction projects. Under his leadership, Doğuş Holding has made many important investments in construction, banking, media, tourism, food and automotive and has become one of the largest conglomerates in Turkey. After his death, his son Ferit Şahenk became the chairman of the board of directors of Doğuş Holding.

In 1992, he established a non-profit organization under his name which focused on improvement on education. Şahenk died on April 1, 2001, due to a heart attack. His final resting place is hometown Niğde.

== Personal life ==
Ayhan Şahenk, who married Deniz Şahenk, was the father of 2 children, Ferit Şahenk and Filiz Şahenk.

Some of his relatives from father's line are living outside of Turkey in Azerbaijan, Uzbekistan and Crimea.
