= Damak Multiple Campus =

Community-based campus affiliated to Tribhuvan University

- दमक बहुमुखी क्याम्पस
- Motto: National leadership in continuing education and professional development.(Khulittai)
- Type: Community Campus
- Established: 2038 BS.
- Affiliations: Tribhuvan University
- Chairman: Mr.Indra Bahadur Budhithoki
- Chairperson: Mr. Hari Prasad Jaiswal
- Academic staff: 69
- Administrative staff: 27
- Students: 7000 approx.
- Location: Damak-9,Jhapa, Province No. 1, Nepal
- Language: Nepali, English
- Nickname: DMC
- Website: damakcampus.edu.np (doesn't work)

Damak Multiple Campus (DMC) is a QAA Accredited affiliate Campus of Tribhuvan University (TU). It lies in Damak, Jhapa, Nepal supported and managed by the community. With affiliation from HSEB Damak multiple campus offers 10+2 program in Science, Management, Humanities and Education. It was established in 2038 BS. Initially only management subject was taught.

== Department ==
Department is a division of a university or school faculty devoted to a particular academic discipline. For the effective teaching service and supervision of the teachers towards their respective department, different departments had created. The following are the department in this college:

- Department of English
- Department of Nepali
- Department of Economics
- Department of Physics
- Department of Education
- Department of Mathematics

== See also ==
- List of universities and colleges in Nepal
- Sukuna Multiple Campus
- List of schools in Nepal
