= TLC (Turkish TV channel) =

Television channel operated in Turkey

TLC Turkey
- Country: Turkey
- Broadcast area: Turkey
- Headquarters: Barbaros Boulevard, Beşiktaş, Bebek, Istanbul, Turkey

Programming
- Language: Turkish
- Picture format: 576i (16:9 SDTV)

Ownership
- Owner: Warner Bros. Discovery
- Sister channels: Cartoon Network; Cartoonito; CNN Türk; DMAX; Eurosport 1 Eurosport 2

History
- Launched: 6 November 2015; 10 years ago
- Replaced: CNBC-e

Links
- Website: www.tlctv.com.tr

TLC is a Turkish Free-to-air television channel operated in Turkey. It replaced CNBC-e in November 2015. It is available on Tivibu, Turkcell TV+, Türksat 4A, Digiturk, D-Smart and KabloTV. It is also available on its Turkish website.

== Logos ==
2015-2023

2023-present
