= Kanal D (Romania) =

Romanian television channel

Kanal D Romania
- Country: Romania
- Broadcast area: Romania, Moldova
- Headquarters: Bucharest, Romania

Programming
- Picture format: 16:9 (576i SDTV/1080i HDTV)

Ownership
- Owner: Doğan Media International SA (4.2%); Light Digital Televisions International SA (3.1%)
- Sister channels: Kanal D2

History
- Launched: 18 February 2007; 19 years ago

Links
- Website: www.kanald.ro

Kanal D Romania (short form of Kanal Doğan) is a national television channel in Romania and a part of Doğan Holding, which is owned by the Turkish media tycoon Aydın Doğan. The channel was launched on 1 March 2007. In 2012, Kanal D Romania was ranked among the top three channels in Romania. Kanal D Romania has also been in the first place with many of its television programs in prime-time, such as Turkish television series and Turkish soap operas.

In 2016, in Prime Time (20:00 - 24:00), Kanal D ranked second among the top TV channels in Romania, both in the All Urban target (an increase from 2015 of +21%) and National (an increase from 2015 of +26%).
