= Alternatif Bank =

Turkish bank, founded 1991

Alternatifbank A.Ş.
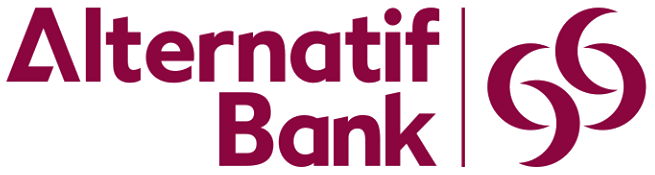
- Company type: Anonim Şirket
- Industry: Banking
- Founded: November 6, 1991; 34 years ago
- Headquarters: Istanbul, Turkey
- Number of locations: 48 branches (2019)
- Key people: Omar Hussain Alfardan (Chairman); Kaan Gür (CEO)
- Products: Banking
- Revenue: ▲ ₺767.1 million (2019)
- Operating income: ▼ ₺219.2 million (2019)
- Net income: ▼ ₺178.1 million (2019)
- Total assets: ▲ ₺30.1 billion (2019)
- Total equity: ▲ ₺2.4 billion (2019)
- Number of employees: 885 (2019)
- Parent: Commercial Bank of Qatar
- Website: www.alternatifbank.com.tr/en

Alternatif Bank, formerly known as ABank, is a Turkish bank with headquarters in Istanbul.

== History ==
The bank was founded in 1991 by the Doğan Holding and was enlisted in 1995.

Having completed 24 years in the banking industry, Alternatif Bank is an important subsidiary of The Commercial Bank (P.S.Q.C.), one of the leading banks in Qatar. Previously owned by one of the leading industrial conglomerates, Anadolu Group. With an asset size of 13.1 billion TRL (as of year-end 2015), Alternatif Bank operates via its 54 branches.

== Sources ==
- Alternatif Bank 2019 Annual Review (PDF), Alternatif Bank, 2019
- Independent Auditor's Report (PDF), Alternatif Bank, 2019
