= Fortune Global Forum =

Fortune Global Forum is an annual conference held by Fortune magazine. The first conference was held in Singapore in 1995. The Fortune Global Forum convenes the presidents, chairmen, CEOs of the world's top companies and also prestigious economists.

The latest forum took place in Riyadh, Saudi Arabia on 26 to 27 October, 2025. The event's theme was "The Great Convergence", which is about presenting great ambition as being more than a slogan, but as a call to transform humanity's future by linking different economies and ideas all over the globe.
