= Third Sector Foundation of Turkey =

Turkish foundation

Third Sector Foundation of Turkey (TUSEV) was established in 1993 by Turkey’s leading civil society organisations (CSOs), and has now grown to a supporting network of over 100 associations and foundations that share a vision of strengthening the legal, fiscal and operational infrastructure of the third (non-profit) sector in Turkey.

TUSEV seeks to promote a legally and fiscally enabling environment for nonprofit organizations in Turkey, encourage strategic and effective giving, facilitate partnerships across the public, private & third sectors, support and engage the international community in learning about and collaborating with the Turkish third sector and conduct research on the sector's role, needs and dynamics to serve as a basis for civil society strengthening initiatives.

TUSEV is a member of the European Foundation Centre, CIVICUS, International Society for Third-Sector Research and WINGS.

TUSEV has four programme areas.

Civil Society Law Reform: This program has been TUSEV's core competency since its establishment in 1993. Over the years, the program has expanded significantly in line with the increased mandate for this focus in the sector. The key objective is to promote an enabling environment for CSOs in Turkey by acting as the key source of information and updates on legal and fiscal issues for the Turkish third sector, promoting mechanisms to increase CSOs participation in the policy making process and CSO-government cooperation, conducting independent policy analysis and advocating for reform, analyzing and monitoring of reform implementation and supporting implementation/capacity building for CSOs and governments in adapting to new legislation and processes.

Social Investment: TUSEV seeks to inform stakeholders (existing and potential donors) about strategic and effective practices, help create a more enabling infrastructure for social investment and philanthropy in Turkey, introduce and support the establishment of new mechanisms that enable the flow of resources to CSOs, such as community foundations and advise new donors and foundations on creating effective giving strategies.

International Relations and Networking: TUSEV, through its International Relations and Networking seeks to create common platforms to exchange best practices and ideas and facilitate cooperation between Turkish civil society organizations, their international counterparts and donors.

Research and Publications:: TUSEV aims to undertake critical research initiatives on issues regarding the third sector and generate useful data and reports that will help to inform practitioners and promote dialogue among all stakeholders.
