= Kral TV =

- Country: Turkey
- Affiliates: Kral FM
- Headquarters: Istanbul

Programming
- Language(s): Turkish
- Picture format: 16:9 (1080i, HDTV)

Ownership
- Owner: Doğuş Media Group
- Sister channels: NTV; NTV Spor; Star TV; Star 2

History
- Launched: 16 August 1994
- Replaced: Teleon

Links
- Website: www.kraltv.com.tr

Kral TV is a music television channel in Turkey owned by Doğuş Group.

Kral TV was launched in August 1994 and became a member of the Doğuş Group in June 2008. Turkey's first music TV channel, Kral TV, triggered the rise of other Turkish music channels and gave a different direction to the Turkish music industry.

Kral TV broadcasts Turkish music videos introduced by on-air hosts 24/7. As the first music channel in Turkey, Kral TV became a platform where both artists and fans found a central location for music news and promotion.

Kral FM is a national radio station based in Istanbul, focusing on arabesque and fantasy music.

== Kral FM ==
Kral FM logo.

Kral FM was founded by Cem Uzan on October 1, 1993, within the Star Media Group, which is affiliated with the Uzan Group, and continued its broadcasts for a long time by remaining affiliated with this group. The radio station was taken over by the state when TMSF seized many Uzan Group companies, including Kral FM. It was sold to Doğuş Group along with Kral TV through a tender. The style change in its broadcasts after being sold to Doğuş Group was initially met with backlash, but these changes were later accepted by the public.

According to many surveys conducted since the nineties, Kral FM is one of the most listened to radio stations in Turkey.

== VJs ==
- VJ Atakan Canbazlar (1st VJ on air in Turkey)
- VJ Ataberk
- VJ Bülent Tapıcı
- VJ Defne Joy Foster
- VJ Gönül Dostu Şener
- VJ Şoray Uzun
- VJ Yeşim
- VJ Ece İncedursun
- VJ Funda Gurdag
- VJ Neslihan
- VJ Refik Sarıöz
- VJ Sibel
- VJ Mohamed
- VJ Adnan
