= Star TV (Turkey) =

Turkish nationwide TV channel

- Country: Turkey
- Broadcast area: Various
- Headquarters: Istanbul, Turkey

Programming
- Language: Turkish
- Picture format: 1080i HDTV (downscaled to 576i for the SD feed)

Ownership
- Owner: Cem Uzan (1989–2004); Ahmet Özal (1989–1992); TMSF (2004–2005); Aydın Doğan (2005–2011); Ferit Şahenk (2011–); Doğuş Media Group (2015–)
- Sister channels: Kral Pop TV; Kral TV; NTV; NTV Spor

History
- Launched: 1 March 1989
- Former names: Magic Box Star 1 (1989–1992); InterStar (1992–2002)

Links
- Website: www.startv.com.tr

Star TV is a Turkish free-to-air national TV channel. It has been owned by Ferit Şahenk's Doğuş Media Group since 2011.

== History ==
Founded by Cem Uzan and Ahmet Özal on 1 March 1989 as Magic Box Incorporated, Star TV is Turkey's first private TV channel. At the time, Turkey had a strict television monopoly law which established TRT as the sole provider of terrestrial television. The company was registered in Liechtenstein, with a capital of 500,000 Swiss francs. To circumvent these problems, Magic Box began negotiations in West Germany on 3 August 1989. The company rented with Eutelsat to deliver its signals on 7 February 1990 and signed an agreement with German commercial channel Sat.1 to use its studios and infrastructure to operate. It then started its test broadcasting on 7 May 1990, from 6pm to 11pm, later expanding its airtime from 1pm to 1am on 11 May; becoming regular on 1 October. For a brief time in the early 1990s, it was called Star Magic Box because the name Star 1 was copyrighted by another media corporation.

Star 1 tried forging partnerships with TRT in order to enable the state broadcaster to liberalize its political viewpoints. Star 1's success on the quick-fast was due to the views public opinion had of the state broadcaster at the time, with 60% favoring Star 1 over 40% favoring TRT's network of channels. Moreover, some former TRT staff members moved to Magic Box Star 1.

Star TV aired many world-known series for the first time in Turkey. Among them were The A-Team, Magnum, P.I. Simon & Simon, MacGyver, Days of Our Lives, M*A*S*H, Lassie, Murphy Brown, Perfect Strangers, Dragnet, Charles in Charge, The Jeffersons, Twin Peaks, Married... with Children, The Bold and the Beautiful, General Hospital, All My Children, Santa Barbara, Another World, Dallas, 21 Jump Street, Miami Vice, The Equalizer, Star Trek: The Next Generation, Wiseguy, Leave It to Beaver, Hunter, Who's the Boss?, Gimme a Break!, Murder, She Wrote, Mission: Impossible, Time Trax, Out of This World and Airwolf. The biggest event in its test phase was the acquisition of the broadcast rights of the Turkish league, with the special Turkish Cup match between Galatasaray and Fenerbahçe on 4 August. This infuriated TRT, which up until then, was against the establishment of a private television channel. The state broadcaster appealed to close the channel, allegedly because it violated its broadcasting monopoly. Magic Box initiated a full-page campaign in newspapers, saying that its Magic Box Star 1 channel had "nothing to do with transmitters and relayers", and that its broadcast was done entirely on satellite. To combat the five TRT channels, on 6 October 1990, the channel made counter-programming with foreign series and music videos.

In 1992, Cem Uzan ended his partnership with Ahmet Özal and, following a long judicial process, moved to Germany and registered the Star 1 trademark all for himself. Because of these events, Cem Uzan renamed the channel as Interstar. Its logo on 13 September 1992 became a blue S with a star on it. Due to an RTÜK violation which resulted in a 15-day suspension, it turned to red in the early 2000s.

The channel is also the first private Turkish channel to start digital broadcasting in 1999; analog satellite broadcasts ended on 11 November 2003.

In February 2004, Star TV was put on the block by Turkish savings and deposit insurance funds (TMSF) along with other media assets, including seven radio stations, a newspaper and another TV station of the Uzan Group, to cover debts owed to the Treasury resulting from the takeover of İmar Bankası and Adabank. TMSF put Star TV up for auction, and it's purchased by Isil Television Broadcasting Corp. of Doğan Media Group, which offered the highest bid of $306.5 m at the auction in September 2005.

Star TV was sold by Doğan Holding to the Doğuş Media Group on 17 October 2011, for $327m. The new management adopted a new logo, replacing the previous S logo with a new, colorful logo featuring a white star in the center, introduced on 1 January 2012. The new logo was developed in Argentina. In late December 2011, the new logo was already placed inside Doğuş Group's building.

== Star TV HD ==
Star TV began broadcasting in HD on 29 May 2009. It's the second active HD channel in Turkey after Kanal D.

== Euro Star ==
The channel also broadcasts in Europe with the name Euro Star, with the difference of not broadcasting international matches live. Euro Star has its own productions in addition to Star TV's productions.
