= Aydın Doğan =

Turkish business magnate and investor

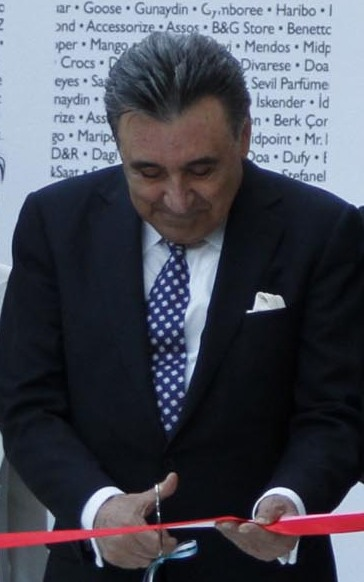
- Born: 15 April 1936 (age 90); Kelkit, Gümüşhane, Turkey
- Education: Istanbul Economy and Commerce Academy
- Occupations: Businessman; investor
- Spouse: Sema Doğan
- Children: Arzuhan; Vuslat; Hanzade; Begümhan
- Website: Aydın Doğan Foundation

Aydın Doğan (born 15 April 1936) is a Turkish business magnate and investor. He is the founder of Doğan Holding, one of Turkey's largest conglomerates.

== Biography ==
Born in 1936 as a member of a well-known family in Kelkit, Doğan went to elementary and secondary school in Kelkit and finished high school in Erzincan. Between 1956 and 1960, he attended Istanbul Economy and Commerce Academy. There, he became the Student Community Leader.

In 1959, he registered his business at the Mecidiyeköy Tax Office and started his professional life trading construction equipment, as well as passenger and other commercial vehicles.

Doğan founded his first industrial company in 1974 and joined both the Assembly and the Administrative Board of the Istanbul Chamber of Commerce. In the years that followed, he served as a board member in the Union of Chambers and Commodity Exchanges of Turkey.

From a small company with just three employees in 1961, he created one of Turkey's top conglomerates with over 13,000 direct employees and an additional 12,000 employment through companies servicing the businesses of Doğan Holding.

Doğan Holding became a publisher with the acquisition of the daily newspaper Milliyet in 1979. With the addition of the prestigious daily newspaper Hürriyet in 1994, he increased his presence in the media. Between 1986 and 1996, he served as the head of the Association of Turkish Newspaper Publishers. In 2004, Doğan became the first elected Turkish Deputy Chairperson of World Association of Newspapers (WAN).

The Doğan Media Holding he founded incorporates the newspapers Posta, Hürriyet, Radikal, Fanatik and Turkish Daily News, and 21 TV channels in Turkey and abroad.

Doğan Holding is active in the fields of energy, media, industry, trade and tourism. In 2016, Doğan Holding generated a profit of US$310 million and it's the biggest collector of advertising revenue in media in Turkey.

Doğan Holding is a public company quoted in Istanbul Stock Exchange. Its ticker symbol is DOHOL.

== Tax investigation ==
In 2009, the Ministry of Finance charged a tax fine in amount of about 3.8 billion Turkish lira (approx. US$2.53 billion) on some companies within the Doğan Media Holding.

Doğan Holding claimed that the decision to impose a tax fine to the group was based on "subjective" evaluations. They argued that if similar fines were to be imposed on other companies on similar grounds, all the share transactions in Turkey could easily be subjected to the same treatment and fined by the tax authorities. And since that was not the case and it was only Dogan Group that was penalized by the Ministry of Finance, the case was politically motivated, they implied.

This implication was voiced strongly by the spokespersons of international bodies like the European Union, while the issue became a priority item in Turkish political agenda.

Doğan Holding held negotiations with the Ministry of Finance in line with the existing legislation. An agreement was concluded and in October 2012, Doğan paid the remainder of the agreed fine earlier than scheduled and thus resolved the tax issue completely.

After 1977 until 2009, Aydın Doğan personally has been the top taxpayer registered with the Istanbul Chamber of Commerce, either in Istanbul or in overall Turkey. He always equated patriotism with proper declaration and prompt payment of taxes.

== Personal life ==
Doğan retired as head of Doğan Holding on 1 January 2010, handing over his post to his daughter, Arzuhan Doğan Yalçındağ, who was chairperson of the TV channel Kanal D and who also serves as head of the Turkish Industrialists' and Businessmen's Association (TÜSİAD). Currently Begümhan Doğan Faralyalı is the Chairwoman of Doğan Holding. Aydın Doğan continues to be the honorary president of the holding firm.

Doğan, with $1 billion net worth, is one of the richest people in Turkey. He is married to Sema Doğan, and has four children and seven grandchildren.

All of his daughters actively take part in the running of Doğan Holding businesses both public and private as chairwomen of respective boards.

== Awards ==
In 1999, Doğan was awarded State Medal of Distinguished Service by the Turkish Government. He received four honorary doctorates in 1999, 2000, 2001 and 2005 respectively from Girne American University, Ege University, Baku State University and Marmara University.

== See also ==
- List of Turks by net worth
