= NTV (Turkish TV channel) =

Turkish nationwide television news channel

- Country: Turkey
- Broadcast area: Worldwide
- Affiliates: NTV Radio
- Headquarters: Büyükdere Avenue, Maslak, Büyükdere, Sarıyer, Istanbul, Turkey

Programming
- Language: Turkish
- Picture format: 576i (16:9 SDTV); 1080i (HDTV)

Ownership
- Owner: Cavit Çağlar (1996-1999); Doğuş Media Group (1999-present)
- Sister channels: Star TV; Kral TV; DMAX; TLC; TV8; TV8,5

History
- Launched: 10 November 1996; 29 years ago

Links
- Website: ntv.com.tr

Availability

Streaming media
- ntv.com.tr: ntv.com.tr/canli-yayin

NTV is a Turkish free-to-air nationwide television news channel owned by Doğuş Media Group.

It was partnered with MSNBC between May 2000 and 2014. Besides domestic and international news, the channel's programming includes documentaries, as well as programs on finance, arts and culture, lifestyle, and sports.

== History ==
NTV was founded in 1996 as a subsidiary of Cavit Çağlar's Nergis Group (hence the original full name of Nergis TV) and as the first news channel of Turkey. In January 1999, the channel became part of Doğuş Media Group. The success of NTV changed the Turkish media industry and started the era of thematic TV channels.

In June 2013, NTV's lack of coverage on the Gezi Park protests saw protests in front of its head office in Istanbul, and the resignation of some NTV staff in protest. The CEO of Doğuş Group at the time, Cem Aydın, conceded that the criticisms were "fair to a large extent", and that "our audience feels like they were betrayed". Shortly after his comments, Aydın left Doğuş Media. Soon after that, NTV refused to air a BBC World News package on press freedom in Turkey, breaking its partnership agreement with the BBC. The BBC suspended the agreement in response.

== NTV HD ==
On 17 January 2016 the channel launched NTV HD, a high-definition simulcast of NTV.

== NTV Radio ==
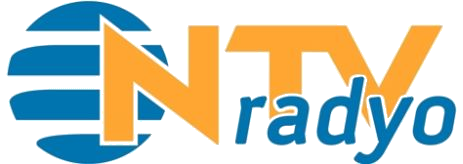
NTV Radio logo

NTV Radyo radio station that started broadcasting on 13 November 2000.
