= Doğuş Group =

Turkish conglomerate

- Company type: Private
- Industry: Conglomerate
- Founded: 1951; 75 years ago
- Founder: Ayhan Şahenk
- Headquarters: Istanbul, Turkey
- Key people: Ferit Şahenk (Chairman & CEO)
- Number of employees: 21,000+
- Website: dogusgrubu.com.tr

Doğuş Holding A.Ş. (Doğuş Group) is one of the largest private-sector conglomerates in Turkey, with a portfolio of 250 companies in 7 industries, including high-end car dealerships, retail stores, restaurants, cafés, construction companies, radio stations, TV channels and tourism businesses. The group used to own one of Turkey's largest private banks, Garanti, now part of BBVA.

== Background ==
Its foundations were originally laid in 1951 when Ayhan Şahenk made his first investments in the construction sector and transformed Doğuş Construction into a leading builder of Turkish roads, ports and hospitals. Doğuş Construction was founded June 17, 1966, the same year Antur Tourism was founded and Club Alantur in Alanya was acquired. He diversified into banking in the late 1970s. While Turkey evolved from a state-controlled economy toward market capitalism in the 1980s, he branched into importing and joint ventures in automotive, tourism and food, with giants like Volkswagen, Sheraton Hotels and Resorts, and ConAgra.

In 1989 Ayhan Şahenk's son, Ferit Şahenk, returned to Istanbul. His father sent him to apprentice at Garanti Bank (now Garanti BBVA). After eight years, he moved to the holding company and has kept adding pieces. Beginning in 1998 he acquired two food retail chains and operated NTV, funding the expansion by selling part of the group's Garanti Bank to the public. Understanding that top talent is essential to running a diverse group, he also created a recruitment division, Humanitas. In 1999, annual revenue of Doğuş Group hit US$5.7 billion.

In April 2001, Ferit took over Doğuş after his father Ayhan Şahenk died at the age of 72. He relinquished some control of the Garanti Bank, selling a quarter of the country's third-largest bank to General Electric for $1.6 billion in 2004, which was regarded as an important step towards greater liberalization in the Turkish banking sector, which had been severely affected by the 2001 economic crisis. He also runs Turkish media properties, capturing more than 10 percent of the country's advertising market.

== Characteristics and structure ==
The Doğuş Group is active in 7 sectors, including automotive, construction, tourism and media.

With over 21,000 employees serving more than 5 million customers, the Group's objective is to use human resources and its superior technological capital to create brand value that will ensure customer loyalty and regional growth through global cooperation.

In 2018, in the course of the Turkish currency and debt crisis, 2018, the group asked its lenders for a debt restructuring. Doğuş’ outstanding loans stood at the equivalent of TRY 23.5 billion (US$5.81 billion) at the end 2017, up 11 percent from the year before. After the crisis, Doğuş divested some of its assets for deleveraging. Some of these divested assets are the Capri Palace Hotel, a 42% stake in İstinye Park shopping mall, MB92 superyacht refit center and its premium yacht marinas branded under D-Marin.

== Projects and interests ==
In 2013, Doğuş Group won a public tender to construct Galataport, a cruise ship port in Karaköy, Istanbul, in a joint venture with Bilgili Holding.

As part of the Galataport development, Doğuş Group became a major sponsor to İstanbul Modern, alongside Eczacıbaşı Group, and developed the new Renzo Piano designed building.

D.ream (Doğuş Restaurant Entertainment and Management) is a majority shareholder of Nusr-Et Group, which became a global success story due to its eponymous chef Nusret Gökçe (Salt Bae).

== List of Group Companies ==
=== Automotive ===
- Doğuş Automotive: Exclusive distributor for Volkswagen Group brands in Türkiye (Volkswagen, Audi, Porsche, Bentley, Lamborghini, Bugatti, SEAT, Skoda, Scania)
- DOD: Second-hand sales arm of the group
- Volkswagen Doğuş Finans (VDF): Auto-financing arm of the group
- TÜVTÜRK

=== Construction ===
- Doğuş Construction
- Teknik Engineering and Consultancy

=== Media ===
- Television Channels: NTV, NTV Para, NTV Spor, NTV World, Star TV, Star 2, Euro Star, Kral TV, Kral Pop TV, Kral World TV, e-TV, e2, e-Film
- Radio Stations: NTV Radyo, NTV Para Radyo, NTV Spor Radyo, NTV World Radio, Kral FM, Kral Pop Radyo, Kral World Radio, Radyo Eksen, Radyo Voyage
- Newspapers: Star, Star Daily News
- OTT Platform: PuhuTV
- Digital Platform: Star Digital
- Live Events: Pozitif, Volkswagen Arena, Babylon, Yapıkredi Bomontiada

=== Food & Beverage and Tourism ===
- D.ream Türkiye: 29, Adile Sultan Sarayı Kandilli, Borsa Restaurant, Da Mario Ristorante, Delimonti, Dolce, Fenix, Frankie, Gina, Günaydın, Habupide, Kebapçı Etiler, Kitchenette, Kilimanjaro, Kiva, Lacivert, Liman İstanbul, Masa, Mezzaluna, Monochrome, Parlé, Rüya, Sait, The Populist, Vogue Restaurant
- D.ream International: Azumi Group (Zuma, Roka, Inko Nito, Etaru, Oblix), Paraguas Group (Amazónico, El Paraguas, Numa Pompilio, Ten Con Ten, Quintin, Aarde), Nusret Group (Nusr-Et Steakhouse, Saltbae Burger), Coya
- D-Hotelier
  - D-Maris Bay
  - D-Resort Göcek
  - D-Resort Ayvalık
  - Maçakızı Bodrum
  - Hyatt House Gebze
  - Grand Hyatt İstanbul
  - Soho House İstanbul
  - Argos In Cappadocia
  - Chenot Palace Weggis

=== Retail ===
- D-Saat: Representing Hublot, Arnold & Son, HYT, Döttling, Bell & Ross, Breitling, Messika and Vacheron Constantin through mono-brand boutiques or “Quadran” branded multi-brand boutiques
- D-Retail: Representing Eleventy, Leica, Loro Piana, M Missoni, Kiko and Under Armour through mono-brand boutiques or “in-formal” branded multi-brand boutiques
- Antur Tourism

=== Real estate ===
- Doğuş REIT: Ppublicly traded on Borsa Istanbul under the ticker symbol DGGYO
- Doğuş Real Estate

=== Technology ===
- Doğuş Teknoloji
- Related Digital
- Reidin
- Invendo

=== Energy ===
- Doğuş Enerji Üretim ve Ticaret. A.Ş.: A 332MW HPP wholly owned by Doğuş Group
- Aslancık Elektrik Üretim A.Ş.: A 120MW HPP in a JV with Doğan Holding and Anadolu Group

=== Other Investments ===
- Zubizu
- D-Gym
- Körfez Havacılık
- Galataport İstanbul
