= Doğan Holding =

Turkish conglomerate

Coordinates: 41°1′55″N 29°2′14″E

- Trade name: Doğan Şirketler Grubu Holding A.Ş.
- Type: Public
- Traded as: BİST: DOHOL
- Industry: Electricity generation; Industry and Trade; Mining; Automotive Trade and Marketing; Finance and Investment; Internet and Entertainment; Real Estate Investment
- Founded: 1959; 67 years ago, in Istanbul
- Founder: Aydın Doğan
- Headquarters: Istanbul, Turkey
- Key people: Hanzade Doğan Boyner (chairwoman); Çağlar Göğüş (CEO)
- Revenue: ▲₺ 84.5 billion (2024)
- Net income: ▼₺ 4.3 billion (2024)
- Owner: Aydın Doğan - 8,57% Doğan Family - 55,57% Public - 35,86%
- Number of employees: 9,953
- Website: doganholding.com.tr

Doğan Şirketler Grubu Holding A.Ş. or simply Doğan Holding, is a Turkish holding company based in Istanbul. It was founded by Aydın Doğan in 1959 and established its first company in the automotive sector in 1961, and was reorganized as a holding company in 1980. Today, Doğan Holding operates across multiple industries, including Electricity generation, energy, iron and steel industry, mining, automotive, finance, investment, real estate, and entertainment sectors.

== Sectors ==
=== Electricity Generation ===
- Galata Wind
- Sunflower Solar
- Aslancık Elektrik

=== Industry and Trade ===
- Karel
- Daiichi
- Sesa Ambalaj
- Maksipak
- Doğan Dış Ticaret
- Kelkit Besi
- Doğan Air

=== Mining ===
- Gümüştaş Mining
- Doku Mining

=== Automotive Trade & Marketing ===
- Doğan Trend Otomotiv

=== Financial & Investment ===
- Doğan Investment Bank
- Hepiyi Sigorta
- Öncü Girişim Sermayesi Yatırım Ortaklığı
- Doruk Faktoring

=== Internet & Entertainment ===
- Kanal D Romania
- Doğan Yayınları
- hepsiemlak.com
- Slow Türk

=== Real Estate Investment ===
- Trump Towers İstanbul
- Trump Shopping Center
- Milta Bodrum Marina
- Double Tree by Hilton Bodrum Marina Vista

== Social Responsibility and Impact Projects ==
=== Aydın Doğan Foundation ===
The Aydın Doğan Foundation was established in 1996 by Honorary Chairman Aydın Doğan and Honorary Vice Chairman Sema Doğan.

Founded with the aim of education and equal opportunities for girls, the foundation organizes education, culture-arts, and sports events such as the Aydın Doğan Award, Aydın Doğan International Cartoon Competition, and Turkish Journalists’ Association Aydın Doğan Young Communicators Competition.

Arzuhan Doğan Yalçındağ serves as the Chairman of the Foundation's Board of Directors.

=== The Anatolia Awards ===
Doğan Holding has sponsored the Anatolia Awards since 2020, which were launched by the Baksı Culture and Art Foundation to highlight productions contributing to Anatolia's common identity. The Anatolia Awards are given to institutions in even years and to individuals in odd years.

=== Empowered Girls, Empowered Future ===
The Aydın Doğan Foundation provides support such as scholarships, mentorship training, summer camps, and student projects to help girls be well-equipped for university life. Additionally, in collaboration with UNICEF, UN Women, and UNFPA, the foundation organizes conferences under the "Empowered Girls, Empowered Future" project on International Day of the Girl Child.

=== Holistic Education Campaign ===
Through the "Well-Maintained Schools" project, the foundation supports the cleaning, security, and technical needs of schools donated to the TC Ministry of National Education. Additionally, through the "Happy Graduates" project, it provides moral support to students of schools contributed to education and participates in their graduation ceremonies.

=== Aydın Doğan International Cartoon Competition ===
The Aydın Doğan Foundation launched the "Aydın Doğan International Cartoon Competition" in 1983, bringing cartoonists together. As of 2025, more than 8,800 artists from 137 countries have participated in the competition. In 2019, "National Comic Book" and "National Children's Book Illustration" categories were added to the competition.

The competition, which has a jury from many different countries, also organizes a competition among children in collaboration with the Creative Children Association.

=== Young Communicators Competition ===
The Aydın Doğan Foundation, in collaboration with the Turkish Journalists Association, organizes the Aydın Doğan Young Communicators Competition to help aspiring communicators be better equipped and not fall behind in competition. In 2019, the competition continued to be organized under the name "Turkish Journalists’ Association Aydın Doğan Young Communicators Competition" as a joint initiative of the Turkish Journalists’ Association and the Aydın Doğan Foundation.

=== Rightful Women Platform ===
Vuslat Doğan Sabancı, who is a founding partner, established the Rightful Women Platform together with nearly 40 women's organizations. With the 'One Voice for Women' organization, which brings together female members of parliament and candidates, as well as civil society organizations, business representatives, and related opinion leaders, programs were organized to seek solutions to eliminate gender inequality and all kinds of discrimination against women in Turkey through women's solidarity.

=== Shared Values Initiative ===
In 2016, under the leadership of Doğan Holding Board Chairwoman Begüm Doğan Faralyalı, the Shared Values Initiative (ODH) was launched. The movement, launched for the purpose of social reconciliation, aims to increase the contributions of shared values to the country.

=== No! To Domestic Violence ===
Doğan Holding launched the 'No! To Domestic Violence!' campaign in 2007 to raise awareness about domestic violence, a social problem. It also initiated a comprehensive training program on domestic violence for imams and police forces.

The campaign organized "No’to Domestic Violence". Before the 2011 General Elections, it established the Rightful Women Platform, which brought together all NGOs working on women's issues in Turkey under one roof and worked to get more women into parliament. It also works to provide microcredit to low-income women to start their own businesses. It was announced that microcredit has been provided to more than 700,000 women to date.

The Emergency Helpline, which started in 2007 as a one-year pilot project but continued to operate for 8 years due to the magnitude of the problem, was transferred to the Federation of Women Associations in Türkiye in 2014.

Records were produced from real X-ray films reflecting the broken limbs of women who went to hospitals due to violence, and the song 'There Are Women' from the Güldünya Songs album released in 2008 was recorded on these records. The campaign, which attracted interest at home and abroad, was presented at the European Parliament in Brussels and the State Parliament in Berlin, and was awarded the United Nations Public Relations Grand Prize in 2006.

The holding implemented a project called 'Violence is a Crime, Ask for Help' with the Association of All Pharmacists Cooperatives, which has 14,000 members. Starting from March 8, International Women's Day, posters were hung in member pharmacies, brochures were sent, and work was initiated to inform violence victims by pharmacists and direct them to relevant institutions in order to bring the reality of violence in society to the agenda, question violence, and create awareness especially about violence against women. Following the earthquakes of February 6, 2023, the "Purple Campus" project, developed by the Federation to support women affected by the disaster and at risk of violence and to help overcome post-traumatic stress, was supported by the Aydın Doğan Foundation, and "Purple Campuses" were established, equipped, and three people were employed in the container area created by the Holding in Hatay Nardüzü.

=== Kelkit Initiative ===
The Kelkit Initiative was launched with the aim of meeting the feed needs of the livestock owned by Kelkit Doğan Besi İşletmeleri, which was established to enable farmers to grow high-value-added products and create benefits for both themselves and Kelkit's economy, through a project carried out with Kelkit farmers. Kelkit Besi planted approximately one million square meters with farmers, provided that they produce according to desired specifications, and guaranteed to purchase all of the 4,000 tons of product obtained from these fields.

== Sales and Acquisitions ==
- 1976, Otokar joined Doğan Holding. In 1999, Otokar shares were transferred.
- Milliyet newspaper, which joined Doğan Holding in 1979, and Vatan newspaper, which joined the group in 2008, were sold to Demirören Holding in 2011.
- Milpa, acquired in 1984, was sold to Re-Pie Portfolio Management Inc. in 2023.
- The majority shares of Ditaş, which joined the holding in 1990, were sold to BDY Group Construction Inc. in 2025.
- The sale of shares of Alternatif Bank, founded in 1991, was completed in 2016.
- The majority shares of Dış Bank, which joined Doğan Holding in 1994, were transferred to Fortis Bank NV-SA.
- The sale of Çelik Halat, which joined Doğan Holding group companies in 1997, was completed in 2022.
- Doğan Burda, launched in 1998 as a partnership between Doğan Holding and German Hubert Burda Media group.
- Petrol Ofisi, purchased in 2000, was sold to Austrian OMV Group in 2010.
- Star TV, acquired in 2005, was sold in 2011.
- It became a partner in Boyabat HES in 2007, and all shares were sold in 2025.
- 2010, it sold its 54.14% stake in Petrol Ofisi to Austrian company OMV.
- 2011, it sold its shares in Ray Sigorta A.Ş. capital to Vienna Insurance Group AG Wiener Versicherung Gruppe (VIG) and TBIH Financial Services Group N.V.
- 2013, Idefix and Prefix were purchased by Doğan Music. Then in 2018, these brands were sold together with D&R to Turkuvaz Media Group.
- 2018, most of Doğan Holding's media organizations, including the digital platform D-Smart, which began operations in 2007, Hürriyet newspaper, Milliyet newspaper, Posta newspaper, Fanatik newspaper, Vatan newspaper, CNN Türk, Kanal D, Cartoon Network, Dream TV, Dream Türk, teve2, Boomerang, and radio channels, were sold to Demirören Holding.
- 2020, it purchased SESA Packaging.
- 2022, Profil Industry, PRS, 3S Kalıp, Maksipak Packaging, Karel, and Daiichi joined Doğan Holding.
- 2023, Aytemiz was sold to PSCJ Tatneft.
- 2024, Doğan Holding sold the remaining 40% stake in DMC to Believe International, which had purchased 60% majority stake in DMC in 2020 and expressed its intention to exercise its purchase option after this initial transaction.
- 2024, Doğan Burda Magazine Group, established on July 21, 1988, as a partnership between Doğan Holding and German Hubert Burda group, was sold to Re-Pie Portfolio Management Group.
- 2025, the transfer of Ditaş shares owned by Doğan Holding to BDY Group was completed.
- 2025, 360 Health was sold to Medila GSYF under the APY Ventures umbrella.

== Doğan Yayın Holding ==
Doğan Yayın Holding was a company within Doğan Holding operating in newspaper, magazine, book, radio and television broadcasting, production, printing, digital media, distribution, retail, and alternative telecommunications. It was founded in 1997 and ended on August 26, 2014, as a result of its merger with Doğan Holding.

== Lawsuits and Allegations ==
It was investigated by the Grand National Assembly of Turkey Research Commission for alleged irregularities in the POAŞ privatization, received a tax evasion penalty from the share transfer to Axel Springer, and allegations were made in Tax Court regarding electronic system bypass.

== Board of Directors ==
Hanzade Doğan Boyner	Chairwoman
Vuslat Doğan Sabancı	Vice Chairwoman
Arzuhan Doğan Yalçındağ	Board Member
Begümhan Doğan Faralyalı	Board Member
Ahmet Toksoy	Board Member
Çağlar Göğüş	Executive Director, chief executive officer - CEO
Mehmet Murat Emirdağ	Board Member
Tolga Babalı	Board Member
Ali Aydın Pandır	Independent Board Member
Ali Fuat Erbil	Independent Board Member
Ayşegül İldeniz	Independent Board Member
Murat Talayhan	Independent Board Member
