= 23rd Parliament of Turkey =

- 10 August 2007 – 12 June 2011
- Speaker(s): Köksal Toptan; Mehmet Ali Şahin
- Deputy Speakers: Sadık Yakut; Eyyüp Cenap Gülpınar; Nevzat Pakdil; Güldal Mumcu; Meral Akşener
- MPs: 550
- Election: July 2007
- Status: AKP majority
- Parties (at start) (Composition shown above): AKP (341); CHP (112); MHP (71); BUA (23); Independents (3)
- Parties (at end): AKP (331); CHP (102); MHP (72); Independents (20); BDP (8); DSP (6); TP (1); Vacant (10)
- Prime Ministers: Recep Tayyip Erdoğan
- Government(s): 60th

This is a list of the 550 Members of Parliament elected in the 2007 general election held in Turkey. The MPs are listed by province, in alphabetical order. Turkey uses a D'Hondt proportional representative system to elect Members of Parliament. These MPs formed the 23rd Parliament of Turkey. An overview of the parliamentary composition is shown in the table below.

Party	Members	Change	Proportion
Justice and Development Party	341	▼12	62.0%
Republican People's Party	112*	▼56	20.4%
Nationalist Movement Party	71	▲71	12.9%
Democratic Society Party	23^	▲23	4.2%
Other independents	3	▲3	0.5%
Total	550		100%
* 13 of the 112 MPs elected under the CHP banner were members of the Democratic Left Party^ Democratic Society Party MPs were elected by standing as independents in order to bypass the 10% parliamentary threshold

== Adana ==
Members	Party
Kürşat Atılgan	Nationalist Movement Party
Ömer Çelik	Justice and Development Party
Nevin Gaye Erbatur	Republican People's Party
Dengir Mir Mehmet Fırat	Justice and Development Party
Fatoş Gürkan	Justice and Development Party
Hulusi Güvel	Republican People's Party
Vahit Kirişçi	Justice and Development Party
Ali Küçükaydın	Justice and Development Party
Tacidar Seyhan	Republican People's Party
Yılmaz Tankut	Nationalist Movement Party
Necdet Ünüvar	Justice and Development Party
Muharrem Varlı	Nationalist Movement Party
Mustafa Vural	Republican People's Party
Recai Yıldırım	Nationalist Movement Party

== Adıyaman ==
Members	Party
Ahmet Aydın	Justice and Development Party
Mehmet Erdoğan	Justice and Development Party
Şevket Gürsoy	Justice and Development Party
Şevket Köse	Republican People's Party
Fehmi Hüsrev Kutlu	Justice and Development Party

== Afyonkarahisar ==
Members	Party
Sait Açba	Justice and Development Party
Abdülkadir Akcan	Nationalist Movement Party
Zekeriya Aslan	Justice and Development Party
Halil Aydoğan	Justice and Development Party
Veysel Eroğlu	Justice and Development Party
Ahmet Koca	Justice and Development Party
Halil Ünlütepe	Republican People's Party

== Ağrı ==
Members	Party
Mehmet Hanifi Alır	Justice and Development Party
Abdülkerim Aydemir	Justice and Development Party
Yaşar Eryılmaz	Justice and Development Party
Cemal Kaya	Justice and Development Party
Fatma Kotan	Justice and Development Party

== Aksaray ==
Members	Party
Ruhi Açıkgöz	Justice and Development Party
Ali Rıza Alaboyun	Justice and Development Party
Osman Ertuğrul	Nationalist Movement Party
İlknur İnceöz	Justice and Development Party

== Amasya ==
Members	Party
Akif Gülle	Justice and Development Party
Avni Erdemir	Justice and Development Party
Hüseyin Ünsal	Republican People's Party

== Ankara ==
=== Ankara 1st electoral district ===
Members	Party
Bekir Aksoy	Nationalist Movement Party
Ali Babacan	Justice and Development Party
Nesrin Baytok	Republican People's Party
Cemil Çiçek	Justice and Development Party
Zeynep Dağı	Justice and Development Party
Eşref Erdem	Republican People's Party
Bülent Gedikli	Justice and Development Party
Mehmet Emrehan Halıcı	Republican People's Party
Burhan Kayatürk	Justice and Development Party
Faruk Koca	Justice and Development Party
Hakkı Suha Okay	Republican People's Party
Mehmet Zekai Özcan	Justice and Development Party
Nazmi Haluk Özdalga	Justice and Development Party
Önder Sav	Republican People's Party
Yıldırım Tuğrul Türkeş	Nationalist Movement Party

=== Ankara 2nd electoral district ===
Members	Party
Zekeriya Akıncı	Republican People's Party
Aşkın Asan	Justice and Development Party
Beşir Atalay	Justice and Development Party
Yılmaz Ateş	Republican People's Party
Tekin Bingöl	Republican People's Party
Ahmet Deniz Bölükbaşı	Nationalist Movement Party
Mehmet Zafer Çağlayan	Justice and Development Party
Reha Denemeç	Justice and Development Party
Haluk İpek	Justice and Development Party
Ahmet İyimaya	Justice and Development Party
Salih Kapusuz	Justice and Development Party
Mustafa Cihan Paçacı	Nationalist Movement Party
Mücahit Pehlivan	Republican People's Party
Mustafa Said Yazıcıoğlu	Justice and Development Party

== Antalya ==
Members	Party
Abdurrahman Arıcı	Justice and Development Party
Sadık Badak	Justice and Development Party
Deniz Baykal	Republican People's Party
Mevlüt Çavuşoğlu	Justice and Development Party
Hüsnü Çöllü	Republican People's Party
Atila Emek	Republican People's Party
Mehmet Günal	Nationalist Movement Party
Yusuf Ziya İrbeç	Justice and Development Party
Osman Kaptan	Republican People's Party
Tayfur Süner	Republican People's Party
Mehmet Ali Şahin	Justice and Development Party
Tunca Toskay	Nationalist Movement Party
Hüseyin Yıldız	Nationalist Movement Party

== Ardahan ==
Members	Party
Saffet Kaya	Justice and Development Party
Ensar Öğüt	Republican People's Party

== Artvin ==
Members	Party
Metin Arifağaoğlu	Republican People's Party
Ertekin Çolak	Justice and Development Party

== Aydın ==
Members	Party
Fatih Atay	Republican People's Party
Özlem Çerçioğlu	Republican People's Party
Mehmet Erdem	Justice and Development Party
Ahmet Ertürk	Justice and Development Party
Atilla Koç	Justice and Development Party
Ertuğrul Kumcuoğlu	Nationalist Movement Party
Recep Taner	Nationalist Movement Party
Ali Uzunırmak	Nationalist Movement Party

== Balıkesir ==
Members	Party
Ayşe Akbaş	Justice and Development Party
Ergün Aydoğan	Republican People's Party
Ahmet Duran Bulut	Nationalist Movement Party
İsmail Özgün	Justice and Development Party
Mehmet Cemal Öztaylan	Justice and Development Party
Hüseyin Pazarcı	Republican People's Party
Ali Osman Sali	Justice and Development Party
Ahmet Edip Uğur	Justice and Development Party

== Bartın ==
Members	Party
Yılmaz Tunç	Justice and Development Party
Muhammed Rıza Yalçınkaya	Republican People's Party

== Batman ==
Members	Party
Ayla Akat Ata	Democratic Society Party
Mehmet Emin Ekmen	Justice and Development Party
Ahmet İnal	Justice and Development Party
Bengi Yıldız	Democratic Society Party

== Bayburt ==
Members	Party
Fetani Battal	Justice and Development Party
Ülkü Gökalp Güney	Justice and Development Party

== Bilecik ==
Members	Party
Fahrettin Poyraz	Justice and Development Party
Yaşar Tüzün	Republican People's Party

== Bingöl ==
Members	Party
Kazım Ataoğlu	Justice and Development Party
Yusuf Coşkun	Justice and Development Party
Cevdet Yılmaz	Justice and Development Party

== Bitlis ==
Members	Party
Zeki Ergezen	Justice and Development Party
Mehmet Nezir Karabaş	Democratic Society Party
Vahit Kiler	Justice and Development Party
Cemal Taşar	Justice and Development Party

== Bolu ==
Members	Party
Yüksel Coşkunyürek	Justice and Development Party
Fatih Metin	Justice and Development Party
Metin Yılmaz	Justice and Development Party

== Burdur ==
Members	Party
Mehmet Alp	Justice and Development Party
Bayram Özçelik	Justice and Development Party
Ramazan Kerim Özkan	Republican People's Party

== Bursa ==
Members	Party
İsmet Büyükataman	Nationalist Movement Party
Hayrettin Çakmak	Justice and Development Party
Canan Candemir Çelik	Justice and Development Party
Faruk Çelik	Justice and Development Party
Kemal Demirel	Republican People's Party
Hamza Hamit Homriş	Nationalist Movement Party
Mehmet Altan Karapaşaoğlu	Justice and Development Party
Sedat Kızılcıklı	Justice and Development Party
Ali Koyuncu	Justice and Development Party
Ali Kul	Justice and Development Party
Mehmet Ocaktan	Justice and Development Party
Onur Başaran Öymen	Republican People's Party
Necati Özensoy	Nationalist Movement Party
Abdullah Özer	Republican People's Party
Mehmet Tunçak	Justice and Development Party
Mehmet Emin Tutan	Justice and Development Party

== Çanakkale ==
Members	Party
Mustafa Kemal Cengiz	Nationalist Movement Party
Mehmet Daniş	Justice and Development Party
Müjdat Kuşku	Justice and Development Party
Ahmet Küçük	Republican People's Party

== Çankırı ==
Members	Party
Nurettin Akman	Justice and Development Party
Ahmet Bukan	Nationalist Movement Party
Suat Kınıklıoğlu	Justice and Development Party

== Çorum ==
Members	Party
Ahmet Aydoğmuş	Justice and Development Party
Cahit Bağcı	Justice and Development Party
Derviş Günday	Republican People's Party
Agah Kafkas	Justice and Development Party
Murat Yıldırım	Justice and Development Party

== Denizli ==
Members	Party
Emin Haluk Ayhan	Nationalist Movement Party
Mithat Ekici	Justice and Development Party
Hasan Erçelebi	Republican People's Party
Mehmet Salih Erdoğan	Justice and Development Party
Ali Rıza Ertemür	Republican People's Party
Selma Aliye Kavaf	Justice and Development Party
Mehmet Yüksel	Justice and Development Party

== Diyarbakır ==
Members	Party
Abdulhadi Akaydın	Justice and Development Party
Kutbettin Arzu	Justice and Development Party
Osman Aslan	Justice and Development Party
Akın Birdal	Democratic Society Party
Selahattin Demirtaş	Democratic Society Party
Mehmet Mehdi Eker	Justice and Development Party
Gültan Kışanak	Democratic Society Party
Abdurrahman Kurt	Justice and Development Party
Ali İhsan Merdanoğlu	Justice and Development Party
Aysel Tuğluk	Democratic Society Party

== Düzce ==
Members	Party
Celal Erbay	Justice and Development Party
Metin Kaşıkoğlu	Justice and Development Party
Yaşar Yakış	Justice and Development Party

== Edirne ==
Members	Party
Necdet Budak	Justice and Development Party
Rasim Çakır	Republican People's Party
Bilgin Paçarız	Republican People's Party
Cemaleddin Uslu	Nationalist Movement Party

== Elazığ ==
Members	Party
Mehmet Necati Çetinkaya	Justice and Development Party
Feyzi İşbaşaran	Justice and Development Party
Tahir Öztürk	Justice and Development Party
Faruk Septioğlu	Justice and Development Party
Hamza Yanılmaz	Justice and Development Party

== Erzincan ==
Members	Party
Sebahattin Karakelle	Justice and Development Party
Erol Tınastepe	Republican People's Party
Binali Yıldırım	Justice and Development Party

== Erzurum ==
Members	Party
Recep Akdağ	Justice and Development Party
Muhyettin Aksak	Justice and Development Party
Saadettin Aydın	Justice and Development Party
Fazilet Dağcı Çığlık	Justice and Development Party
Zeki Ertugay	Nationalist Movement Party
Muzaffer Gülyurt	Justice and Development Party
İbrahim Kavaz	Justice and Development Party

== Eskişehir ==
Members	Party
Beytullah Asil	Nationalist Movement Party
Hüseyin Tayfun İçli	Republican People's Party
Hasan Murat Mercan	Justice and Development Party
Emin Nedim Öztürk	Justice and Development Party
Fehmi Murat Sönmez	Republican People's Party
Kemal Unakıtan	Justice and Development Party

== Gaziantep ==
Members	Party
Yaşar Ağyüz	Republican People's Party
Mahmut Durdu	Justice and Development Party
Akif Ekici	Republican People's Party
Mehmet Erdoğan	Justice and Development Party
İbrahim Halil Mazıcıoğlu	Justice and Development Party
Özlem Müftüoğlu	Justice and Development Party
Hasan Özdemir	Nationalist Movement Party
Mehmet Sarı	Justice and Development Party
Fatma Şahin	Justice and Development Party
Mehmet Şimşek	Justice and Development Party

== Giresun ==
Members	Party
Nurettin Canikli	Justice and Development Party
Eşref Karaibrahim	Republican People's Party
Murat Özkan	Nationalist Movement Party
Hacı Hasan Sönmez	Justice and Development Party
Ali Temür	Justice and Development Party

== Gümüşhane ==
Members	Party
Kemalettin Aydın	Justice and Development Party
Yahya Doğan	Justice and Development Party

== Hakkari ==
Members	Party
Hamit Geylani	Democratic Society Party
Abdülmuttalip Özbek	Justice and Development Party
Rüstem Zeydan	Justice and Development Party

== Hatay ==
Members	Party
Fuat Çay	Republican People's Party
Süleyman Turan Çirkin	Nationalist Movement Party
Gökhan Durgun	Republican People's Party
Sadullah Ergin	Justice and Development Party
Abdülhadi Kahya	Justice and Development Party
Orhan Karasayar	Justice and Development Party
Mustafa Öztürk	Justice and Development Party
Fevzi Şanverdi	Justice and Development Party
Abdulaziz Yazar	Republican People's Party
İzzettin Yılmaz	Nationalist Movement Party

== Iğdır ==
Members	Party
Pervin Buldan	Democratic Society Party
Ali Güner	Justice and Development Party

== Isparta ==
Members	Party
Süreyya Sadi Bilgiç	Justice and Development Party
Mevlüt Coşkuner	Republican People's Party
Mehmet Sait Dilek	Justice and Development Party
Süleyman Nevzat Korkmaz	Nationalist Movement Party
Haydar Kemal Kurt	Justice and Development Party

== İstanbul ==
=== İstanbul 1st electoral district ===
Members	Party
Ayşe Jale Ağırbaş	Republican People's Party
Gündüz Aktan	Nationalist Movement Party
Mustafa Ataş	Justice and Development Party
Nusret Bayraktar	Justice and Development Party
Hüseyin Besli	Justice and Development Party
Mehmet Beyazıt Denizolgun	Justice and Development Party
Recep Tayyip Erdoğan	Justice and Development Party
İdris Güllüce	Justice and Development Party
Ertuğrul Günay	Justice and Development Party
İrfan Gündüz	Justice and Development Party
Algan Hacaloğlu	Republican People's Party
İlhan Kesici	Republican People's Party
Mesude Nursuna Memecan	Justice and Development Party
Bayramali Meral	Republican People's Party
Şinasi Öktem	Republican People's Party
Mehmet Sekmen	Justice and Development Party
Fatma Nur Serter	Republican People's Party
Edibe Sözen	Justice and Development Party
Ahmet Tan	Republican People's Party
Ali Topuz	Republican People's Party
Durmuşali Torlak	Nationalist Movement Party
Özlem Piltanoğlu Türköne	Justice and Development Party
Mehmet Ufuk Uras	Democratic Society Party
Hasan Kemal Yardımcı	Justice and Development Party

=== İstanbul 2nd electoral district ===
Members	Party
Necla Arat	Republican People's Party
Egemen Bağış	Justice and Development Party
Ayşenur Bahçekapılı	Justice and Development Party
Murat Başesgioğlu	Justice and Development Party
Necat Birinci	Justice and Development Party
Alaattin Büyükkaya	Justice and Development Party
Nimet Çubukçu	Justice and Development Party
Ömer Dinçer	Justice and Development Party
Canan Kalsın	Justice and Development Party
Kemal Kılıçdaroğlu	Republican People's Party
Recep Koral	Justice and Development Party
Burhan Kuzu	Justice and Development Party
Mithat Melen	Nationalist Movement Party
Mustafa Özyürek	Republican People's Party
Mehmet Sevigen	Republican People's Party
Çetin Soysal	Republican People's Party
Ümit Şafak	Nationalist Movement Party
Bihlun Tamaylıgil	Republican People's Party
Süleyman Yağız	Republican People's Party
Osman Gazi Yağmurdereli	Justice and Development Party
Hayati Yazıcı	Justice and Development Party

=== İstanbul 3rd electoral district ===
Members	Party
Abdülkadir Aksu	Justice and Development Party
Meral Akşener	Nationalist Movement Party
Güldal Akşit	Justice and Development Party
Lokman Ayva	Justice and Development Party
Fuat Bol	Justice and Development Party
Reha Çamuroğlu	Justice and Development Party
Alev Dedegil	Justice and Development Party
Mehmet Domaç	Justice and Development Party
Nazım Ekren	Justice and Development Party
Mustafa Şükrü Elekdağ	Republican People's Party
Halide İncekara	Justice and Development Party
Ünal Kacır	Justice and Development Party
Nevzat Yalçıntaş	Justice and Development Party
Atila Kaya	Nationalist Movement Party
Birgen Keleş	Republican People's Party
Feyzullah Kıyıklık	Justice and Development Party
Esfender Korkmaz	Republican People's Party
Hasan Macit	Republican People's Party
Hüseyin Mert	Republican People's Party
Mehmet Müezzinoğlu	Justice and Development Party
Mehmet Cihat Özönder	Nationalist Movement Party
Mehmet Ali Özpolat	Republican People's Party
İdris Naim Şahin	Justice and Development Party
Sebahat Tuncel	Democratic Society Party
Sacid Yıldız	Republican People's Party
İbrahim Yiğit	Justice and Development Party

== İzmir ==
=== İzmir 1st electoral district ===
Members	Party
Mehmet Aydın	Justice and Development Party
Şenol Bal	Nationalist Movement Party
Bülent Baratalı	Republican People's Party
Ahmet Ersin	Republican People's Party
Abdurrezzak Erten	Republican People's Party
Fatma Seniha Nükhet Hotar	Justice and Development Party
İbrahim Hasgür	Justice and Development Party
Şükran Güldal Mumcu	Republican People's Party
Harun Öztürk	Republican People's Party
Mehmet Sayım Tekelioğlu	Justice and Development Party
Tuğrul Yemişçi	Justice and Development Party
Oktay Vural	Nationalist Movement Party

=== İzmir 2nd electoral district ===
Members	Party
Selçuk Ayhan	Republican People's Party
Taha Aksoy	Justice and Development Party
Kıvılcım Kemal Anadol	Republican People's Party
Canan Aritman	Republican People's Party
Recai Birgün	Republican People's Party
Mehmet Vecdi Gönül	Justice and Development Party
Erdal Kalkan	Justice and Development Party
İsmail Katmerci	Justice and Development Party
Oğuz Oyan	Republican People's Party
Kamil Erdal Sipahi	Nationalist Movement Party
Mehmet Ali Susam	Republican People's Party
Ahmet Kenan Tanrıkulu	Nationalist Movement Party

== Kahramanmaraş ==
Members	Party
Fatih Arıkan	Justice and Development Party
Avni Doğan	Justice and Development Party
Veysi Kaynak	Justice and Development Party
Durdu Özbolat	Republican People's Party
Nevzat Pakdil	Justice and Development Party
Mehmet Akif Paksoy	Nationalist Movement Party
Mehmet Sağlam	Justice and Development Party
Cafer Tatlıbal	Justice and Development Party

== Karabük ==
Members	Party
Mehmet Ceylan	Justice and Development Party
Cumhur Ünal	Justice and Development Party
Mustafa Ünal	Justice and Development Party

== Karaman ==
Members	Party
Mevlüt Akgün	Justice and Development Party
Hasan Çalış	Nationalist Movement Party
Lütfi Elvan	Justice and Development Party

== Kars ==
Members	Party
Gürcan Dağdaş	Nationalist Movement Party
Mahmut Esat Güven	Justice and Development Party
Zeki Karabayır	Justice and Development Party

== Kastamonu ==
Members	Party
Hasan Altan	Justice and Development Party
Hakkı Köylü	Justice and Development Party
Mehmet Serdaroğlu	Nationalist Movement Party
Musa Sıvacıoğlu	Justice and Development Party

== Kayseri ==
Members	Party
Sabahattin Çakmakoğlu	Nationalist Movement Party
Mustafa Elitaş	Justice and Development Party
Abdullah Gül	Justice and Development Party
Yaşar Karayel	Justice and Development Party
Mehmet Şevki Kulkuloğlu	Republican People's Party
Ahmet Öksüzkaya	Justice and Development Party
Sadık Yakut	Justice and Development Party
Taner Yıldız	Justice and Development Party

== Kırıkkale ==
Members	Party
Osman Durmuş	Nationalist Movement Party
Vahit Erdem	Justice and Development Party
Turan Kıratlı	Justice and Development Party
Mustafa Özbayrak	Justice and Development Party

== Kırklareli ==
Members	Party
Tansel Barış	Republican People's Party
Turgut Dibek	Republican People's Party
Ahmet Gökhan Sarıçam	Justice and Development Party

== Kırşehir ==
Members	Party
Mikail Arslan	Justice and Development Party
Abdullah Çalışkan	Justice and Development Party
Metin Çobanoğlu	Nationalist Movement Party

== Kilis ==
Members	Party
Hüseyin Devecioğlu	Justice and Development Party
Hasan Kara	Justice and Development Party

== Kocaeli ==
Members	Party
Eyüp Ayar	Justice and Development Party
Muzaffer Baştopçu	Justice and Development Party
Cumali Durmuş	Nationalist Movement Party
Hikmet Erenkaya	Republican People's Party
Nihat Ergün	Justice and Development Party
Azize Sibel Gönül	Justice and Development Party
Fikri Işık	Justice and Development Party
Osman Pepe	Justice and Development Party
Mehmet Cevdet Selvi	Republican People's Party

== Konya ==
Members	Party
Hasan Angı	Justice and Development Party
Faruk Bal	Nationalist Movement Party
Ahmet Büyükakkaşlar	Justice and Development Party
Muharrem Candan	Justice and Development Party
Abdullah Çetinkaya	Justice and Development Party
Orhan Erdem	Justice and Development Party
Sami Güçlü	Justice and Development Party
Mustafa Kabakçı	Justice and Development Party
Mustafa Kalaycı	Nationalist Movement Party
Atilla Kart	Republican People's Party
Özkan Öksüz	Justice and Development Party
Kerim Özkul	Justice and Development Party
Ali Öztürk	Justice and Development Party
Hüsnü Tuna	Justice and Development Party
Harun Tüfekci	Justice and Development Party
Ayşe Türkmenoğlu	Justice and Development Party

== Kütahya ==
Members	Party
Soner Aksoy	Justice and Development Party
İsmail Hakkı Biçer	Justice and Development Party
Alim Işık	Nationalist Movement Party
Hasan Fehmi Kinay	Justice and Development Party
Hüsnü Ordu	Justice and Development Party
Hüseyin Tuğcu	Justice and Development Party

== Malatya ==
Members	Party
Ferit Mevlüt Aslanoğlu	Republican People's Party
Öznur Çalık	Justice and Development Party
Mahmut Mücahit Fındıklı	Justice and Development Party
İhsan Koca	Justice and Development Party
Fuat Ölmeztoprak	Justice and Development Party
Ömer Faruk Öz	Justice and Development Party
Mehmet Şahin	Justice and Development Party

== Manisa ==
Members	Party
Erkan Akçay	Nationalist Movement Party
Bülent Arınç	Justice and Development Party
Recai Berber	Justice and Development Party
İsmail Bilen	Justice and Development Party
Mehmet Çerçi	Justice and Development Party
Mustafa Enöz	Nationalist Movement Party
Şahin Mengü	Republican People's Party
Ahmet Orhan	Nationalist Movement Party
Hüseyin Tanrıverdi	Justice and Development Party
Mustafa Erdoğan Yetenç	Republican People's Party

== Mardin ==
Members	Party
Emine Ayna	Democratic Society Party
Süleyman Çelebi	Justice and Development Party
Mehmet Halit Demir	Justice and Development Party
Gönül Bekin Şahkulubey	Justice and Development Party
Ahmet Türk	Democratic Society Party
Cüneyt Yüksel	Justice and Development Party

== Mersin ==
Members	Party
Akif Akkuş	Nationalist Movement Party
Behiç Çelik	Nationalist Movement Party
Ali Er	Justice and Development Party
İsa Gök	Republican People's Party
Ömer İnan	Justice and Development Party
Ali Oksal	Republican People's Party
Ali Rıza Öztürk	Republican People's Party
Vahap Seçer	Republican People's Party
Mehmet Şandır	Nationalist Movement Party
Kürşad Tüzmen	Justice and Development Party
Kadir Ural	Nationalist Movement Party
Mehmet Zafer Üskül	Justice and Development Party

== Muğla ==
Members	Party
Ali Arslan	Republican People's Party
Gürol Ergin	Republican People's Party
Metin Ergün	Nationalist Movement Party
Mehmet Nil Hıdır	Justice and Development Party
Yüksel Özden	Justice and Development Party
Fevzi Topuz	Republican People's Party

== Muş ==
Members	Party
Seracettin Karayağız	Justice and Development Party
Sırrı Sakık	Democratic Society Party
Mehmet Nuri Yaman	Democratic Society Party
Medeni Yılmaz	Justice and Development Party

== Nevşehir ==
Members	Party
Mahmut Dede	Justice and Development Party
Ahmet Erdal Feralan	Justice and Development Party
Rıtvan Köybaşı	Justice and Development Party

== Niğde ==
Members	Party
İsmail Göksel	Justice and Development Party
Mümin İnan	Nationalist Movement Party
Muharrem Selamoğlu	Justice and Development Party

== Ordu ==
Members	Party
Eyüp Fatsa	Justice and Development Party
Mehmet Hilmi Güler	Justice and Development Party
Rahmi Güner	Republican People's Party
Mustafa Hamarat	Justice and Development Party
Rıdvan Yalçın	Nationalist Movement Party
Ayhan Yılmaz	Justice and Development Party
Enver Yılmaz	Justice and Development Party

== Osmaniye ==
Members	Party
Devlet Bahçeli	Nationalist Movement Party
Hakan Coşkun	Nationalist Movement Party
İbrahim Mete Doğruer	Justice and Development Party
Durdu Mehmet Kastal	Justice and Development Party

== Rize ==
Members	Party
Bayram Ali Bayramoğlu	Justice and Development Party
Lütfi Çırakoğlu	Justice and Development Party
Ahmet Mesut Yılmaz	Independent

== Sakarya ==
Members	Party
Erol Aslan Cebeci	Justice and Development Party
Hasan Ali Çelik	Justice and Development Party
Şaban Dişli	Justice and Development Party
Münir Kutluata	Nationalist Movement Party
Ayhan Sefer Üstün	Justice and Development Party
Recep Yıldırım	Justice and Development Party

== Samsun ==
Members	Party
Suat Binici	Republican People's Party
Osman Çakır	Nationalist Movement Party
Mustafa Demir	Justice and Development Party
Cemal Yılmaz Demir	Justice and Development Party
Suat Kılıç	Justice and Development Party
Haluk Koç	Republican People's Party
Fatih Öztürk	Justice and Development Party
Birnur Şahinoğlu	Justice and Development Party
Ahmet Yeni	Justice and Development Party

== Siirt ==
Members	Party
Afif Demirkıran	Justice and Development Party
Memet Yılmaz Helvacıoğlu	Justice and Development Party
Osman Özçelik	Independent

== Sinop ==
Members	Party
Engin Altay	Republican People's Party
Abdurrahman Dodurgalı	Justice and Development Party
Kadir Tıngıroğlu	Justice and Development Party

== Sivas ==
Members	Party
Mehmet Mustafa Açıkalın	Justice and Development Party
Osman Kılıç	Justice and Development Party
Malik Ecder Özdemir	Republican People's Party
Selami Uzun	Justice and Development Party
Muhsin Yazıcıoğlu	Independent
Hamza Yerlikaya	Justice and Development Party

== Şanlıurfa ==
Members	Party
Yahya Akman	Justice and Development Party
Ramazan Başak	Justice and Development Party
İbrahim Binici	Democratic Society Party
Sabahattin Cevheri	Democratic Society Party
Seyit Eyyüpoğlu	Justice and Development Party
Eyyüp Cenap Gülpınar	Justice and Development Party
Zülfükar İzol	Justice and Development Party
Mustafa Kuş	Justice and Development Party
Abdulkadir Emin Önen	Justice and Development Party
Çağla Aktemur Özyavuz	Justice and Development Party
Abdurrahman Müfit Yetkin	Justice and Development Party

== Şırnak ==
Members	Party
Sevahir Bayındır	Democratic Society Party
Hasip Kaplan	Democratic Society Party
Abdullah Veli Seyda	Justice and Development Party

== Tekirdağ ==
Members	Party
Tevfik Ziyaeddin Akbulut	Justice and Development Party
Kemalettin Nalcı	Nationalist Movement Party
Faik Öztrak	Republican People's Party
Necip Taylan	Justice and Development Party
Enis Tütüncü	Republican People's Party

== Tokat ==
Members	Party
Zeyid Aslan	Justice and Development Party
Şükrü Ayalan	Justice and Development Party
Osman Demir	Justice and Development Party
Orhan Ziya Diren	Republican People's Party
Reşat Doğru	Nationalist Movement Party
Hüseyin Gülsün	Justice and Development Party
Dilek Yüksel	Justice and Development Party

== Trabzon ==
Members	Party
Asım Aykan	Justice and Development Party
Mustafa Cumur	Justice and Development Party
Cevdet Erdöl	Justice and Development Party
Kemalettin Göktaş	Justice and Development Party
Mehmet Akif Hamzaçebi	Republican People's Party
Faruk Nafız Özak	Justice and Development Party
Safiye Seymenoğlu	Justice and Development Party
Süleyman Latif Yunusoğlu	Nationalist Movement Party

== Tunceli ==
Members	Party
Kamer Genç	Republican People's Party
Şerafettin Halis	Democratic Society Party

== Uşak ==
Members	Party
Osman Coşkunoğlu	Republican People's Party
Mustafa Çetin	Justice and Development Party
Nuri Uslu	Justice and Development Party

== Van ==
Members	Party
Kerem Altun	Justice and Development Party
Hüseyin Çelik	Justice and Development Party
İkram Dinçer	Justice and Development Party
Fatma Kurtulan	Democratic Society Party
Gülşen Orhan	Justice and Development Party
Kayhan Türkmenoğlu	Justice and Development Party
Özdal Üçer	Democratic Society Party

== Yalova ==
Members	Party
İlhan Evcin	Justice and Development Party
Muharrem İnce	Republican People's Party

== Yozgat ==
Members	Party
Abdulkadir Akgül	Justice and Development Party
Bekir Bozdağ	Justice and Development Party
Osman Coşkun	Justice and Development Party
Mehmet Çiçek	Justice and Development Party
Mehmet Ekici	Nationalist Movement Party
Mehmet Yaşar Öztürk	Justice and Development Party

== Zonguldak ==
Members	Party
Fazlı Erdoğan	Justice and Development Party
Ali Koçal	Republican People's Party
Ali İhsan Köktürk	Republican People's Party
Köksal Toptan	Justice and Development Party
Polat Türkmen	Justice and Development Party
