= December 2009 Kurdish protests in Turkey =

Turkish Protests

December 2009 Kurdish protests
- Part of Kurdish–Turkish conflict, Serhildan
- Date: December 11–15, 2009
- Location: Turkey; Iraqi Kurdistan
- Caused by: Ban of the Democratic Society Party by the Constitutional Court of Turkey
- Methods: Riots; Civil resistance; Demonstrations; General strikes; Spontaneous uprisings
- Result: DTP remains banned; Arrest of many DTP and KCK members; BDP parliamentary bloc formed to replace DTP; Escalation of violence in Kurdish–Turkish conflict

Parties
| Kurdish protesters DTP; BDP KCK | Turkey: Turkish military; Turkish police; Village guards; Turkish nationalist protesters |

Lead figures
| Ahmet Türk; Aysel Tuğluk; Emine Ayna; Leyla Zana; Nurettin Demirtaş; Selahattin Demirtaş; Gültan Kışanak; Zübeyır Aydar | Recep Tayyip Erdoğan; Abdullah Gül; İlker Başbuğ; Işık Koşaner; Beşir Atalay; Vecdi Gönül |

Casualties and losses
| 3 killed 8 injured 32 arrested | 5 police injured |

The December 2009 Kurdish protests in Turkey were a series of widespread civil disturbances in Turkey lasting five days. The protests erupted after a December 11, 2009 ruling by the Constitutional Court of Turkey that banned the pro-Kurdish Democratic Society Party (DTP), after finding them guilty of having links to the outlawed Kurdistan Workers' Party (PKK) and spreading "terrorist propaganda."

== Background ==
The DTP was formed in 2005 through a merger of Turkey's main pro-Kurdish party, the Democratic People's Party (DEHAP), and the newly found Democratic Society Movement (DTH) that had been founded by former Democracy Party (DEP) MPs Leyla Zana, Orhan Doğan, Hatip Dicle and Selim Sadak after their release from prison in 2004. After being formed, the party called on the PKK to lay down its arms. The PKK responded by declaring a unilateral cease-fire that lasted until September 20, 2005.

The DEHAP had won 6.2 percent of the vote in the 2002 general election, failing to meet the 10% election threshold and thus failing to win any seats in parliament. Consequently, for the 2007 general election the DTP fielded its candidates as independents. In total, 726 independent candidates won 1,835,486 votes, a total of 5.24% and 26 out of 550 seats in the Grand National Assembly of Turkey. Twenty-one independents then formed a DTP faction in parliament. The election was, however, mainly a disappointment for the DTP as the majority of votes in the Kurdish-dominated regions went to Turkish Prime Minister Recep Tayyip Erdoğan's Justice and Development Party (AKP). The party, however, performed well during the March 29, 2009 local elections, winning 2,116,684 votes or 5.41% and doubling its number of district governors from four to eight, increasing its total amount of mayors of small towns from 32 to 51. For the first time they won a majority in the southeast and aside from the Batman Province, Hakkâri Province, Diyarbakır Province and Şırnak Province which DEHAP had won in 2004, the DTP managed to win Van Province, Siirt Province and Iğdır Provinces from the AKP.

After the March 2009 election, approximately 50 DTP members were arrested. Between April and August 2009, more than 500 DTP members were taken into custody and 267 were indicted. According to the Turkish Human Rights Association, the government carried out three crackdowns against the DTP between April and October 2009 in which 1,000 people were detained, including 450 who were not told what they were being charged with.

After surviving a closure case in 2007, on December 11, 2009, the Constitutional Court of Turkey voted to ban the DTP. The court needed a two-thirds majority, or 7 votes, to close the party, however banned it by a single vote of 6 to 5. The court ruled that the party had links to the PKK and was guilty of spreading "terrorist propaganda". Chairman Ahmet Türk and co-chair Aysel Tuğluk were expelled from Parliament, and they and 35 other party members, including Leyla Zana, were banned from joining any political party for five years. The 19 DTP members that remained in parliament joined the Peace and Democracy Party (BDP), which had already been formed in anticipation of the ban.

== The protests ==
In protest of the ban, the 19 remaining DTP MPs boycotted parliamentary sessions. Meanwhile, protests broke out all over Turkey's predominantly Kurdish region and in Western cities such as Istanbul, Ankara and İzmir and lasted the whole weekend.

In Istanbul, several protests of a few hundred people broke out over the following few days. Protesters destroyed property and attacked police using stones and Molotov cocktails, and set street fires. Police attacked protesters using tear gas, water cannons, and pepper gas. 200 people, mostly Kurdish children, closed traffic and threw stones at buses in Sultangazi and Başakşehir districts. Police intervened with tear gas. Turkish nationalists also attacked protestors, resulting in at least one injury from a gunshot.

On December 11, shortly after the verdict was announced, over 1,000 people gathered outside the DTP offices in Diyarbakır chanting "Blood for blood! Revenge!" Protesters attacked police with petrol bombs and smashed security cameras. Riot police responded with tear gas and water cannons. In Istanbul, around 100 people gathered around the local DTP office with a banner reading "An End to the Attacks on the Kurdish People".

On December 12 in Hakkâri, about 1000 protesters clashed with security forces. Police used water cannons to break up protests. Protestors unsuccessfully attempted to lynch a police chief and an officer. A young girl was hospitalized during the protests and over a dozen protesters were arrested.

In Van five policemen were hospitalized after violent clashes with protesters. 20 people were taken into custody during the protest in Van. In Beytüşşebap and Cizre districts of Şırnak province the protests continued until late in the night, as protesters threw Molotov cocktails and stones at buildings such as post offices, banks, and the Beytüşşebap district governor's house. In Cizre, protesters blocked the road of the Habur Customs Gate, closing off the road to Iraq. Police intervened to re-open the road. Sit-ins were held in Iğdır and Şanlıurfa.

On December 13, 2009, protests continued in Yüksekova district. Police used tear gas and water cannons against protesters. Protesters barricaded roads and started fires in the streets. Shops were closed in all city centers of Hakkâri during the weekend. Yüksekova protests had been ongoing since Saturday as crowds of DTP supporters threw firebombs and rocks at police vehicles.

December 14, 2009, over 5,000 people Diyarbakır welcomed DTP MPs which drove into the town in an open bus. Later a group of youths started pelting police with rocks and ripped up street signs, and police responded with water cannons. Protesters also stoned a local AKP office, and several people were arrested. In Doğubeyazıt protesters threw petrol bombs and stones at police and police responded with tear gas and water cannons.

On December 15, 2009, two Kurdish protesters were killed and seven injured when a shopkeeper opened fire on a crowd of protesters in Bulanık, Muş Province with an assault rifle after the windows of his shop had been broken.

=== Iraqi Kurdistan ===
On December 16, hundreds of people protested in the Kurdistan Region's capital Erbil to protest the ban.

On December 17, over 500 Kurds from Iran, Iraq, Syria and Turkey protested the ban in Sulaymaniyah.

=== Human rights concerns ===
Throughout Turkey, jandarma and police regularly harassed DTP members through verbal threats, arbitrary detentions at rallies, and detention at checkpoints. Police routinely detained demonstrators for a few hours at a time. Security forces also regularly harassed villagers they believed were sympathetic to DTP.

== Reactions ==
=== Turkey ===
- Government of Turkey: Turkish President Abdullah Gül defended the court's decision, stating: "What else can the court do when there are party administrators who declare the terrorist organisation to be their reason of existence." and releasing the following statement condemning the protests: “Tension or clashes have no benefit for anyone. All problems can be solved by democratic and political measures. Our people saw that the Turkish state is acting with good intentions, but the terror organization wants to sabotage this.”
- Constitutional Court of Turkey: Constitutional Court Chairman Hasim Kilic said that the party's closure "was decided due to its connections with the terror organisation and because it became a focal point of the activities against the country's integrity".
- Republican People's Party (CHP): Deniz Baykal released the following statement concerning the ban: "It is impossible to greet such events with happiness. It is saddening for all of us in democracies when there is the obligation to close a political party."
- Nationalist Movement Party (MHP): Devlet Bahçeli said it would be preferable to punish individual politicians rather than banning entire parties, but said that there "could be a different approach for the case when political parties were seen as supporting terrorism and considering it a means for their separatist aims."
- Democratic Society Party (DTP): Ahmet Türk called the court's ruling political and not lawful. He blamed the AKP over its silence regarding the ruling. DTP members responded by boycotting parliamentary sessions.

Turkey's EU negotiator Egemen Bağış criticized the ruling, saying that courts should hold politicians rather than political parties responsible for unlawful actions.

=== International ===
- Iraqi Kurdistan
  - Kurdistan Regional Government (KRG): President of Iraqi Kurdistan Massoud Barzani's office released a statement declaring: "The KRP was pleased with the recent reforms and conciliatory policies introduced by [Turkey's ruling] Justice and Development Party (AKP) to engage with the Kurds and hopes that the court's decision does not derail this important process from going forward." KRG spokesman Hadi Mahmud said that the KRG would not interfere in Turkey's internal issues and called the ban an internal issue.
  - Goran Movement: Kurdistan National Assembly Jaafar Ali, from the opposition Goran movement however criticized the KRG for its muted response and released a statement saying that "The Goran movement condemns the ban and sees it as a step against democracy. This is a clear violation of the political rights of Kurds. This step tells us that the Kurdish initiative has yet to take hold in Turkish society or politics."
  - Kurdistan Islamic Union (KIU): The KIU released the following statement regarding the ban: "Unfortunately, this decision is a big obstacle for the encouraging and democratic Kurdish initiative of the AKP," and called on the Turkish government to be pragmatic in dealing with the issue.
- European Union: the Presidency of the Council of the European Union press office released the following statement about the court's verdicht: "While strongly denouncing violence and terrorism, the Presidency recalls that the dissolution of political parties is an exceptional measure that should be used with utmost restraint. The EU has called on Turkey, as a negotiating country, to make the necessary constitutional amendments to bring its legislation on political parties in line with the recommendations by the Venice Commission of the Council of Europe and relevant provisions of the European Convention on Human Rights."
- United States: A spokesman for the United States Department of State called the ruling an internal matter, but he added that Turkey should advance political freedom for all its citizens and that measures that "limit or restrain these freedoms should be exercised with extreme caution".
