= 2011–2012 Kurdish protests in Turkey =

2011-2012 Kurdish rights protests in Turkey

- Part of Kurdish–Turkish conflict and Serhildan; the impact of the Arab Spring
- Date: 24 March 2011 – 18 November 2012 (1 year, 7 months, 3 weeks and 4 days)
- Location: Turkey
- Caused by: Political repression, suppression of Kurdish language, institutional racism, discrimination, centralization of authority, ban on several Kurdish parliamentary candidates, Turkish military operations against the PKK
- Goals: Lifting of a ban on Kurdish candidates, reinstitution of Kurdish-language education, creation of an autonomous Kurdish region, release of political prisoners, end of military operations against Kurdish dissidents
- Methods: Civil disobedience, civil resistance, demonstrations, online activism, protest marches, rioting, sit-ins, strike actions, friday prayers
- Concessions: Ban on some Kurdish candidates lifted Compensation paid to families of 34 civilians killed in Uludere airstrike Hatip Dicle allowed to be a candidate for MP, however, after the election, Turkey's Supreme Election Board (TSK) cancelled his parliament membership. Kurdish language lessons allowed in schools. Start of Turkish-Kurd peace process

Parties
Peace and Democracy Party; Koma Civakên Kurdistan; Peace Mothers	Government of Turkey; Justice and Development Party; Turkish Armed Forces; Turkish Police Force; Village Guards

Lead figures
Pro-Kurdish Leaders: Selahattin Demirtaş; Gülten Kışanak; Leyla Zana; Ahmet Türk; Aysel Tuğluk; Osman Baydemir; Nurettin Demirtaş; Hatip Dicle; Pervin Buldan; Sebahat Tuncel; Ayla Akat Ata	Government Leaders: Abdullah Gül; Recep Tayyip Erdoğan; Beşir Atalay; Osman Güneş; İdris Naim Şahin; Vecdi Gönül; İsmet Yılmaz; Military Commanders: Işık Koşaner; Necdet Özel; Bekir Kalyoncu

Number
More than 100,000 protesters	Some officers

Casualties
- Deaths: 3
- Injuries: 308
- Arrested: 2,506

The 2011–2012 Kurdish protests in Turkey were protests in Turkey, led by the Peace and Democracy Party (BDP), against restrictions of Kurdish rights by of the country's Kurdish minority's rights. Although they were the latest in a long series of protest actions by Kurds in Turkey, they were strongly influenced by the concurrent popular protests throughout the Middle East and North Africa, and the Turkish publication Hürriyet Daily News has suggested that the popularly dubbed "Arab Spring" that has seen revolutions in Egypt and Tunisia may lead to a "Kurdish Summer" in the northern reaches of the Middle East. Protesters have taken to the streets both in Istanbul and in southeast Turkey, with some demonstrations also reported as far west in Anatolia as İzmir.

From 24 March and 10 May, a total of 2 protesters were killed, 308 injured and 2,506 detained by Turkish authorities.

The protests declined in July after a new breakout of violence between state forces and Kurdistan Workers' Party rebels.

== Background ==
There are currently 14 to 20 million Kurds in Turkey, living predominantly in the southeast of the country. The Kurdish people are a unique ethnic group with their own language and customs. In Turkey, the Kurdish uprising dates back to at least 1925, but the most recent major rebellion started in 1978 and has crossed the border into adjacent Iraqi Kurdistan on a number of occasions. Over 3,000 Kurdish villages have been "evacuated" by the Turkish armed forces since the conflict began.

The Kurdistan Workers' Party (PKK), a Kurdish separatist group listed as a terrorist organization by the governments of Turkey and the United States, demands autonomy for Turkish Kurdistan. It has also called upon Turkish authorities to release Kurdish prisoners and detainees, overturn a ban on Kurdish-language education, and cease military action against Kurdish groups. In 2009, Prime Minister Recep Tayyip Erdoğan launched a "Kurdish initiative" aiming to broaden cultural rights for Kurds, but many Kurdish protesters have said this does not go far enough.

On 28 February 2011, the PKK announced an end to a unilateral ceasefire it had declared in August 2010, prompting Erdoğan to comment on the pro-Kurdish Peace and Democracy Party (BDP) over its alleged collusion with the militant group. "A political party that is in Parliament hurling out threats ... during every election period puts pressure on people who want to exercise their democratic will and serves no other purpose," the prime minister said.

=== Censorship ===
Internet censorship is practiced by the government of Turkey. A number of websites, including those of pro-Kurdish and alternative news outlets such as Voice of America, Bianet, and Azadiya Welat, are subject to a filter imposed by the Turkish Council of State. Bianet reported that according to new regulations adopted by the government in late February, this filter will be expanded from blocking access to certain websites from Internet cafés to affect all Internet access points and ISPs in Turkey sometime in the near future.

On 13 March 2011, The New York Times reported a turnout of "thousands" for a march in Istanbul protesting censorship of the press and the arrest of over a dozen journalists by Turkish authorities since the start of the month. The Turkish media advocacy group Freedom to Journalists Platform said Turkey held 68 journalists as of mid-March, including many on charges of "inciting public hatred" and similar offenses, though the government maintains only 27 journalists are incarcerated on unrelated charges.

== Timeline ==
=== Main phase ===
==== March ====
24 March

In a statement published online on 24 March, the Peace and Democracy Party (BDP) announced the immediate beginning of a civil disobedience campaign, beginning with a strike and sit-in in Diyarbakır, the largest city in the Kurdish region. The government responded by deploying soldiers and Army vehicles to break up the unsanctioned demonstration, which drew about 3,000 participants. Just a fraction of these participants—a few dozen MPs and Kurdish city officials, including the mayor of Diyarbakır—were permitted to proceed to the sit-in venue, while thousands more demonstrators thronged outside and shouted angry slogans. Police clashed with demonstrators, some of whom attempted to attack officers with fireworks, and detained five. A similar scene erupted in Batman, where a larger number of protesters were reportedly detained and protest tents were forcibly taken down.

27 March

Demonstrations spread to Istanbul, İzmir, Silopi, and Antalya by 27 March. Protest camps also sprang up in Tunceli, Muş, Van, and Ağrı. Several dozen protesters were arrested.

Protest leader and MP Selahattin Demirtaş said that the Peace and Democracy Party was determined to carry out civil disobedience actions across the Kurdish region and condemned the governor of Diyarbakır Province for declaring the protests unlawful. Fellow Kurdish leader Ahmet Türk said they will continue the sit-in action despite the pressure from the Turkish authorities. "The prime minister who sends greetings to Tahrir Square while sending tanks and gas bombs at us should know that the [Kurdish] people have been seeking their freedom in their [own] Tahrir Squares," said Demirtaş, referring to Prime Minister Recep Tayyip Erdoğan and his favorable stance toward Egyptian revolutionaries.

28 March

About 40,000 people marched to the alleged site of mass graves of Kurds in Siirt Province on 28 March. The protest march spun off into rioting in the province. In Batman and Diyarbakır, two of the original sites of protests as part of the civil disobedience campaign, media reported Turkish security forces detained several more protesters.

==== April ====
6 April

Demirtaş ratcheted up the civil disobedience campaign by Kurdish protesters on 6 April by accusing imams sent by the government to lead prayers in Turkey's southeast of supporting and spying for the ruling Justice and Development Party and urging Kurds not to pray behind them. Demirtaş also said that sermons in Kurdish parts of the country should only be given in Kurdish, a policy Erdoğan opposes.

8 April

At Friday prayers in Diyarbakır on 8 April, a number of Kurds boycotted in solidarity with the BDP, with many holding signs and banners supporting Demirtaş and the protests as others prayed. At least one newspaper ran photographs of the boycott.

11 April

On 11 April, the conservative Turkish weekly Aksiyon published allegations that "militant imams" loyal to the PKK intend to promote terrorism among Kurds by portraying PKK fighters killed in clashes with government forces as martyrs. According to the report, imprisoned PKK leader Abdullah Öcalan devised the plan from behind bars. It also alleged that the banned PKK is using the BDP as a political front.

19 April

On 19 April, Turkey's elections board ruled that 12 Kurdish politicians who had registered as independent candidates were barred from running in the June parliamentary elections. The politicians included Leyla Zana, who has spent ten years in prison for alleged PKK membership despite a ruling by the European Court of Human Rights that her imprisonment violated freedom of speech.

Kurds angry over the ban rallied in Hakkâri, Şırnak, Istanbul, Van, and Diyarbakır. More than 2,000 protesters gathered in Taksim Square on the European side of Istanbul, Turkey's largest city. Police used tear gas to disperse the protest, which reportedly injured several, including at least one police officer. Shopkeepers and workers went on strike in Hakkâri and Van. Van also saw clashes between protesters and Turkish gendarmes, with its Kurdish mayor being among the demonstrators injured in the fighting, and scuffles were also reported in Diyarbakır, where a 15-year-old boy was reportedly hospitalized after being shot and injured by police. The semi-official Anatolian Agency claimed significant property damage in the city of Diyarbakır and said police confiscated several Molotov cocktails brought to the demonstration by Kurdish protesters.

20 April

On 20 April, police fired live rounds at protesters in Bismil. One protester was killed, four were injured, and at least 16 were arrested. The incident drew outrage from the Kurdish community, with Selahattin Demirtaş canceling a planned meeting with President Abdullah Gül in Ankara over the shooting.

21 April

The elections board reversed its decision to bar several Kurdish political candidates on 21 April after facing massive outcry. Some journalists expected this to be the end of intensified protests and rioting. Nonetheless, the Anatolian Agency reported that one police officer and two civilians were injured in rioting in Batman on the same day. The semi-official news agency alleged that Kurdish protesters attacked police with rocks, firebombs, and gunfire. It also said three people were hospitalized in Van Province after Kurdish demonstrators set fire to a bank with a Molotov cocktail. Police reportedly employed tear gas and water cannons to disperse the riot.

23 April

According to a report in the pro-government daily Zaman, alleged PKK supporters threw Molotov cocktails at a house in suburban Şanlıurfa while a family was sleeping there on the night of 23 April, seriously damaging the property but causing only minor injuries. Police detained two in connection with the incident.

24 April

Zaman claimed pro-BDP protesters in Ergani attacked buildings and gendarmes with Molotov cocktails and firecrackers. It also reported that 32 rioters in Batman were detained after a crowd of demonstrators pelted police with stones and tried to set fire to shops. These demonstrations came just days after international media reported an easing of tensions in southeast Turkey following the reversal of a ban on several Kurdish parliamentary candidates. The Anatolian Agency reported that two off-duty soldiers, wearing civilian clothes, were shot from behind in Yüksekova, leaving both injured. It also claimed rioting, including stone- and firebomb-throwing, in Bismil, which police reportedly used tear gas and water cannon to disperse.

25 April

In the early morning of 25 April, police raided and dismantled numerous "democratic solution" tents and arrested protesters in 17 provinces across Turkey, Bianet reported. One MP was reportedly injured in a scuffle with police.

BDP supporters protested violently in the Aksaray neighborhood of Istanbul, attacking police, vehicles, and shops, Zaman alleged. Turkish authorities also arrested 35 in Hakkâri on alleged PKK ties. In response, more than 20,000 Kurds living near the international border with Iraq marched to a border crossing and threatened to enter Iraqi Kurdistan in a show of defiance unless the 35 were released, forcing Peace and Democracy Party officials to intervene. The protesters eventually returned to their homes.

26 April

On 26 April, about 20,000 in southeast Turkey reportedly turned out to protest the detention of alleged PKK supporters in Hakkâri, according to media. About 10,000 protesters set off on a march from Hakkâri to Van, according to Kurdish officials.

Police detained 17 in Manisa's Kurdish quarter and tore down BDP-backed "democratic solution" tents and protest camps in Tunceli, Manisa, İzmir, Mardin, and Şırnak. Authorities said they were searching for Molotov cocktails and took down tents where they purportedly found the makeshift firebombs.

27 April

On 27 April, demonstrators hurled Molotov cocktails at riot police located near Aksaray metro station, which prompted the police to use tear gas to disperse the protesters. The demonstrators were mostly dispersed, although a small group remained in Aksaray, broadcaster NTV reported.

29 April

Abdullah Öcalan, the jailed PKK leader, called for a violent rebellion against the Turkish government on 29 April at a meeting with his lawyers, Turkish daily Vatan reported.

30 April

Turkish police conducted raids on 30 April in Batman, Istanbul, and Mardin, among other districts, and arrested 70 "agitators" authorities said were trained by the PKK to organize demonstrations and exploit chaos created by Kurdish protests.

In Muş, Prime Minister Erdoğan said, "There is no longer a Kurdish question in this country." He said Turkey only has to address the needs of individual Kurds as ordinary citizens of the republic. He called Kurds and Turks "brothers" and attacked both the PKK and the BDP, saying, "We can't get anywhere with those who try to set one brother against another. We can't get anywhere with those who are trying to divide this country."

==== May ====
1 May

Kurds had a presence at the peaceful May Day demonstrations on 1 May in Istanbul's Taksim Square and elsewhere throughout Turkey, along with several other minority and advocacy groups. Several speakers called upon authorities to release jailed journalists, MPs, and city officials, including those arrested in Turkish Kurdistan during the previous months' protests, eliciting applause from the crowds in Taksim Square.

4 May

Thousands of Kurds in Diyarbakır turned out on 4 May for the funeral of alleged Kurdistan Workers' Party fighters killed the previous week as part of the Kurdish–Turkish conflict, Reuters reported.

16 May

On 15 May, Turkish military forces killed twelve PKK rebels who were crossing from northern Iraq (Kurdistan Regional Government) into Turkey, while losing one of their own soldiers to an exploding mine. The next day, thousands of protesters turned out in Diyarbakir, and several hundred staged sit-ins and various other protests in Istanbul. Around 100 people, some allegedly from the pro-Kurdish Peace and Democracy Party contesting the upcoming Turkish elections, crossed the border to retrieve two bodies who were left at the site of the ambush. Demonstrations in Diyarbakir turned violent.

==== June ====
12 June

During the 12 June 2011 national elections the BDP nominated 61 independent candidates, winning 2,819,917 votes or 6.57% and increasing its number of seats from 20 to 36. The BDP won the most support in Şırnak (72.87%), Hakkâri (70.87%), Diyarbakır (62.08%) and Mardin (62.08%) Provinces.

=== Post-Election ===
26 June

Pro-Kurdish protesters turned out in Istanbul, marching to a major mosque to protest a ruling by the Turkish board of elections disqualifying Hatip Dicle of BDP from his seat in Parliament. Several candidates elected on the BDP slate were stripped of office over the weekend, some of them because the board determined that they could not hold office while imprisoned. Protesters claim the removed MPs are political prisoners and that Turkish authorities are denying Kurds their elected representation. The ruling AK Party picked up several additional seats in Parliament due to the disqualifications, compounding Kurdish anger. Riot police assembled in Istanbul to block the protest march, firing tear gas. Al Jazeera reported that only after the tear gas was deployed did protesters become violent, assaulting officers with stones and metal poles, but police succeeded in dispersing the demonstration. No serious injuries were reported.

After 12 June, Turkish elections, large scale hostilities between the Turkish government and the PKK were resumed leading to the heaviest violence in the country since the 1990s. The rise in armed violence between Kurdish militants and the Turkish state coincided with a sharp decline of peaceful activities such as protests. According to ex-PKK leader Nizamettin Taş the Turkish state was successful in dealing a blow to the protest movement by arresting so many KCK activists.

29 August

Another protest took place on Hakkâri after army's bombing of PKK camps in Qandil mountains, and a member of BDP who was protesting the air assault, was killed by police.

=== Uludere Protests ===
After the Uludere airstrike killed 34 to 50 Kurdish civilians, major protests followed in Turkey's predominantly Kurdish cities, most notably Diyarbakir where protests turned violent and police used batons and tear gas against protesters and protesters threw stones and Molotov cocktails at police. Protests were also held in Ankara and Istanbul, where over 1,000 protesters gathered in Taksim Square and threw stones at police and smashed vehicles before police dispersed the crowds with tear gas and water cannons.

District governor Naif Yavuz, who was from the beginning on together with the smugglers at the autopsy and the funeral service, paid later a visit to house of the relatives of the victims for condolence. Shortly after his visit, he was attacked by a mob, which attempted to lynch him. He barely escaped the attack with the help of his security guards, however, was hospitalized for his injuries. It turned out to be an act of people, who came outside the village. It has been alleged that BDP deputy Hasip Kaplan was behind this attack.

On 3 January, Turkish authorities, although denying any misconduct by the armed forces, agreed to pay compensation to the families of the civilians who had been killed in the bombing.

=== Early 2012 ===
14 January

Some 300 Kurds protested in Istanbul against the arrest of 49 alleged KCK members by Turkish authorities

15 February Öcalan protests

Tens of thousands of Kurds protested to demand Öcalan's freedom on the 13th anniversary of his capture. Demonstrations were held in Adana, Adıyaman, Antep, Batman, Bingöl, Tunceli, Elazığ, Erzurum, Iğdır, Hatay, Kars, Mersin, Siirt, Van and its Bostaniçi, Gevaş, Muradiye, Gürpınar and Saray districts, Ağrı and its Doğubayazıt district, Hakkari and its Yüksekova district, Muş and its Bulanık district, Diyarbakir and its Kocaköy, Hilvan, Bismil, Silvan and Dicle districts, Şanlıurfa and its Viranşehir, Suruç and Ceylanpınar districts, Mardin and its Midyat, Kızıltepe, Derik, Dargeçit, Mazıdağı and Nusaybin districts, Şırnak and its Güçlükonak, Cizre and Beytüşşebap districts as well as İzmir, Aydın, Istanbul and Bodrum. Police arrested three in Diyarbakir and 24 in Istanbul when attempting to stop the demonstrations. In Cizre street fighting between rioters and police lasted for hours.

=== Newroz protests ===
18 and 19 March

after the BDP and PKK both called for protests, tens of thousands of protesters came together in Diyarbakir waving Kurdish flags and holding up posters of Abdullah Ocalan, chanting "long live the leader Apo," and "the PKK is the people." Hundreds of riot police backed by armored vehicles and helicopters took up strategic positions in the city to prevent several marches from coming together in one large crowd. This resulted in widespread rioting all over the city in which rioters burned down at least four mobile telephone relay stations. In Istanbul police tried to prevent two groups of 1,000 protesters from coming together. Haci Zengin, the head of an Istanbul branch of the BDP, was killed during the protests after being hit on the head by a tear gas canister. Police detained 106 people at the demonstration and nine were injured

20 March

Two police officers were shot in Yuksekova in Hakkari province. In Batman, Ahmet Turk was taken to hospital after suffering from the effects of teargas fired to disperse crowds at the protests he was attending, a total of 15 people were injured during protests in the city. In Şanlıurfa police fired pressurized water as well as live ammunition at a protest attended by Leyla Zana, in which one protester was arrested. In Mersin a great number of protesters were also arrested. In Cizre over 5,000 protesters clashed with police, hurling petrol bombs and fireworks at the police. Police also clashed with demonstrators in Istanbul. A total of 24 people were injured. One of the policemen injured in Yuksekova died of his wounds the next day.

21 March

Protests continued for a fourth day. Though less violent than the protests on previous days, this marked the most violent Nowruz celebration since the 1990s. At the same day PKK attacks killed 5 policemen in the mountains outside Sirnak and injured one in a bombing of the AKP's Diyarbakir headquarters.

=== April–September 2012 ===
14 July

Diyarbakır was the scene of major protests and clashes between Kurds and the police as the pro-Kurdish BDP insisted on holding a rally to commemorate the 30-year anniversary of the 1982 hunger strike in Diyarbakır prison in which Mazlum Doğan, Kemal Pir, Hayri Durmuş, Ali Çiçek and Akif Yılmaz died. The rally that had been banned by the provincial government. Over 10,000 police were used to prevent the protesters from gathering in İstasyon Square while over 300 BDP protests held sit-ins in Sümer Park. According to the Turkish government, the protests resulted in 76 injured, including 23 policemen, although human rights organizations believe the number may be much higher. The injured included BDP Deputy President Pervin Buldan, BDP MPs Ayla Akat Ata from Batman and Mülkiye Birtane from Kars, the BDP's Diyarbakır Provincial Head Zübeyde Zümrüt, Diyarbakır Mayor Osman Baydemir and Remzi Akkaya. 87 people were arrested.

3 August

A protest is held after a speech by Leyla Zana calling for Abdullah Öcalan to be transferred from prison to house arrest. Police arrested over 100 people at the protest.

25 August

Thousands of people rallied in Cizre to attend a protest organized by the BDP, attended by Cizre mayor Mustafa Gören. The Turkish government did not give permission for the protest to be held, citing display of pro-PKK propaganda as the reason. Police were sent to break up the protest and violence ensued.

=== Hunger Strike ===
12 September

On 12 September, on the anniversary of the 1980 Turkish coup d'état some 70 Kurdish prisoners went on hunger strike and were soon joined by over 600 others. Some 682 inmates in 67 prisons went on hunger-strike, demanding improved prison conditions and eventual house arrest or full release of PKK leader Abdullah Öcalan as well as increased cultural rights for Kurdish people, including Kurdish language education and the right to defend themselves in court, in Kurdish.

30 October

On the 49th day of the hunger strike, protests were held in Diyarbakır, Van, Hakkâri, Cizre and Silopi, all stores were closed and streets were empty aside from protesters which marched in solidarity with the hunger strike. Over 10,000 protesters clashed with police in Diyarbakır, which used tear gas to disperse the crowd. Nine people were detained.

31 October

Several thousand Kurds held a protest march in Diyarbakır in support of a hunger strike held in Turkish prisons by Kurdish political prisoners. The protesters clashed with police, who used tear gas and water cannon, throwing stones and firebombs at the police. As part of the protest, all shops were closed and families didn't send their children to school. In Van several thousand people also marched towards the town's prison, were 182 inmates were in a hunger strike. In Istanbul a sit-in was held by a group of protesters which were dispersed by 100 policemen using pepper spray. Protesters attempted to march to a tent in Okmeydanı were Peace Mothers were camping, but the tent was attacked by police which used tear gas on the women. 10 people suffered injuries and 18 were detained.

3 November

Protests in Cizre and Diyarbakir at a funeral of a PKK fighter killed by the Turkish military, resulted in clashes between protesters and riot police. 20 protesters were arrested.

5 November

Over 10,000 people joined the hunger strike in solidarity after Turkish Prime Minister Erdoğan denied the hunger strike's existence and refused to meet any of its demands. Erdogan's hard line reaction is contrary to the more moderate President Abdullah Gul, revealing a split in the government's approach to the Kurdish issue in the lead-up to the 2013 presidential election. It is also further evidence of the blossoming relationship between the Turkish government and the Kurdish Regional Government in Iraqi Kurdistan.

17 November

Abdullah Öcalan calls on the 1,700 hunger-strikers to end their strike, stating it had achieved its goals.

18 November

In response to Öcalan's call to end the hunger strikes, the inmates' spokesman Deniz Kaya released the following statement: "On the basis of our leader's call ... we end our protest as of November 18, 2012," and the hunger strike was ended.

== International reaction ==
In April, members of the Kurdish diaspora in London staged a week-long protest camp and marched through Haringey to show solidarity with Kurds from Turkey.

== Anti-PKK Protests ==
=== 17 July ===
Several hundred Turks marched in Istanbul to protest the killing of 13 Turkish soldiers in Diyarbakir by PKK militants. Riot police endeavored to keep protesters away from an ethnically Kurdish neighborhood, fearing clashes might erupt.

== See also ==
- List of modern conflicts in the Middle East
- Arab Spring
- Democracy in the Middle East
- Democratic Initiative
- Kurdistan
- Kurds in Turkey
- Kurdish people
