= Thousand Hope Candidates =

Thousand Hope Candidates Bin Umut Adayları
- Founded: 2007
- Dissolved: 2011
- Preceded by: Democratic People's Party (2002)
- Succeeded by: Labour, Democracy and Freedom Bloc (2011)
- Ideology: Socialism; Minority rights Kurdish nationalism
- Political position: Left wing
- Colours: Purple
- Slogan: Türkiye'ye bir sözümüz var (We have a promise for Turkey)
- Participating parties: Democratic Society Party; Freedom and Solidarity Party; Labour Party; Socialist Democracy Party

Website
- Website

The Thousand Hope Candidates (Turkish: Bin Umut Adayları) was an electoral alliance between four left-wing political parties in Turkey, formed in preparation for the 2007 general election. The alliance contested the election by fielding candidates from participating parties as independents in order to bypass the 10% election threshold needed to win seats in the Turkish Grand National Assembly. The alliance's candidates won a total of 1,334,518 votes and 22 seats in the election.

Lacking a realistic prospect of gaining parliamentary representation due to the 10% threshold, the pro-Kurdish Democratic Society Party (DTP), the socialist libertarian Freedom and Solidarity Party (ÖDP), the Labour Party (EMEP) and the Socialist Democracy Party (SDP) joined forces and decided to field candidates under a joint alliance, hence creating the Thousand Hope alliance. The alliance stated that its candidates included individuals who could extend the appeal of the political left to the general public, having also extended support to other left-wing candidates who were not part of the four member parties. The alliance fielded 65 candidates in 40 provinces. The Labour Party and the Freedom and Solidarity Party fielded their own candidates in the remaining 41 provinces but fell well short of the 10% electoral threshold.

The alliance was also in favour of minority rights, having openly campaigned as 'Kurds wanting peace'. Segments of society such as the LGBT community, which the alliance claimed had faced discrimination and oppression, played a major role in alliance's election campaign. Critics branded the alliance as Kurdish nationalist, pointing to the pro-Kurdish DTP, which was the biggest of the four participating parties.

A similar alliance, namely the Labour, Democracy and Freedom Bloc, was formed in preparation for the 2011 general election four years later.

== General election performance ==
=== Results ===
Thousand Hope Candidates' performance in the 2007 general election
Participating parties			Votes			Seats		Map
Party	Leader	Candidates	Votes	Percentage	Swing	Elected	Seat ±	Map
Democratic Society Party	Ahmet Türk	65	1,334,518	3.81%	▼2.42%	22 / 550	▲22	
Freedom and Solidarity Party	Ufuk Uras	65	1,334,518	3.81%	▼2.42%	22 / 550	▲22	
Socialist Democracy Party	Akın Birdal	65	1,334,518	3.81%	▼2.42%	22 / 550	▲22	
Labour Party	Levent Tüzel	65	1,334,518	3.81%	▼2.42%	22 / 550	▲22	

- This table only shows the votes won by the Thousand Hope candidates, who stood in 40 provinces. In the remaining 41 provinces, the Freedom and Solidarity Party and the Labour Party fielded their own candidates. The votes that they won in these other provinces that were not part of the Thousand Hope candidate alliance are not shown.
- Swing and seat change is compared to the Democratic People's Party's performance in the 2002 general election
- Provinces won by Thousand Hope candidates are coloured purple in the map

=== Elected members ===
22 of a total of 65 candidates were elected. The combined votes won by Thousand Hope candidates were higher than any other party in the provinces of Tunceli, Diyarbakır, Muş, Iğdır, Hakkari and Şırnak. The results represented a significant swing to the governing Justice and Development Party (AKP), which made heavy gains in the Kurdish south-east were the Democratic People's Party had won back in 2002. Only 2 of the 22 Thousand Hope Candidates elected were from non-southeastern provinces, namely Ufuk Uras and Sebahat Tuncel from İstanbul's 1st and 3rd electoral district respectively. The following table shows the distribution of DTP, SDP, EMEP and ÖDP members within the 22 elected members.

Party	Leader	Elected
Democratic Society Party	Ahmet Türk	20 / 22
Socialist Democracy Party	Akın Birdal	1 / 22
Freedom and Solidarity Party	Ufuk Uras	1 / 22
Labour Party	Levent Tüzel	0 / 22
Thousand Hope total		22 / 550

The full list of members elected under the Thousand Hope banner are as follows:

Elected member	Party	Electoral district	Vote share
Ahmet Türk	Democratic Society Party	Mardin	19.35%
Akın Birdal	Socialist Democracy Party	Diyarbakır	11.78%
Ayla Akat Ata	Democratic Society Party	Batman	19.78%
Aysel Tuğluk	Democratic Society Party	Diyarbakır	9.44%
Bengi Yıldız	Democratic Society Party	Batman	19.30%
Emine Ayna	Democratic Society Party	Mardin	15.57%
Fatma Kurtulan	Democratic Society Party	Van	11.80%
Gültan Kışanak	Democratic Society Party	Diyarbakır	12.59%
Hamit Geylani	Democratic Society Party	Hakkari	17.58%
Hasip Kaplan	Democratic Society Party	Şırnak	24.18%
İbrahim Binici	Democratic Society Party	Şanlıurfa	6.11%
Mehmet Nezir Karabaş	Democratic Society Party	Bitlis	16.04%
Mehmet Nuri Yaman	Democratic Society Party	Muş	16.83%
Ufuk Uras	Freedom and Solidarity Party	İstanbul (I)	3.74%
Osman Özçelik	Democratic Society Party	Siirt	24.59%
Özdal Üçer	Democratic Society Party	Van	11.20%
Pervin Buldan	Democratic Society Party	Iğdır	26.90%
Sebahat Tuncel	Democratic Society Party	İstanbul (III)	4.54%
Selahattin Demirtaş	Democratic Society Party	Diyarbakır	9.74%
Sevahir Bayındır	Democratic Society Party	Şırnak	29.47%
Sırrı Sakık	Democratic Society Party	Muş	16.90%
Şerafettin Halis	Democratic Society Party	Tunceli	27.14%

=== Votes won by participating parties elsewhere ===
The Labour Party and the Freedom and Solidarity Party both fielded candidates as a party in electoral districts where the Thousand Hope Candidates did not run for election. The votes shares won by these parties are as follows.

Party	Votes			Seats	
Party	Votes	Percentage	Swing	Elected	Seat ±
Freedom and Solidarity Party	52,055	0.15%	▼0.19%	0	0
Labour Party	26,292	0.08%	▲0.08%	0	0

== See also ==
- 23rd Parliament of Turkey
- Electoral system of Turkey
- Peoples' Democratic Congress
- Peace and Democracy Party
- Kurdish nationalism
- Labour, Democracy and Freedom Bloc
