= Diyarbakır (electoral district) =

Electoral district for the Grand National Assembly of Turkey

Coordinates: 37°50′N 34°45′E

- electoral district for the Grand National Assembly of Turkey
- Diyarbakır shown within Turkey
- Province: Diyarbakır
- Electorate: 1.147.014

Current electoral district
- Created: 1920
- Seats: 12 Historical: 11 (1999)
- MPs: List: Mehmet Gali̇p Ensari̇oğlu AK Party Mehmet Sai̇t Yaz AK Party Suna Kepolu Ataman AK Party Berdan Öztürk YSGP Hali̇de Türkoğlu YSGP Osman Cengiz Çandar YSGP Adalet Kaya YSGP Serhat Eren YSGP Sevi̇lay Çelenk Özen YSGP Mehmet Kamaç YSGP Ceylan Akça Cupolo YSGP Sezgin Tanrıkulu CHP
- Turnout at last election: 81.72%
- Representation
- DEM: 8 / 12
- AK Party: 3 / 12
- CHP: 1 / 12

Diyarbakır is an electoral district of the Grand National Assembly of Turkey. It elects ten members of parliament (deputies) to represent the province of the same name for a four-year term by the D'Hondt method, a party-list proportional representation system.

== Members ==
Population reviews of each electoral district are conducted before each general election, which can lead to certain districts being granted a smaller or greater number of parliamentary seats.

MPs for Diyarbakır, 2002 onwards
Election	2002 (22nd Parliament)	2007 (23rd Parliament)	2011 (24th Parliament)	June 2015 (25th Parliament)	November 2015 (26th Parliament)
MP	Aziz Akgül; AK Party	Kutbettin Arzu; AK Parrt	Cuma İçten; AK Party	Cevdet Yılmaz; AK Party	Ebubekir Bal; AK Party
MP	İhsan Arslan; AK Party		Mehmet Galip Ensarioğlu; AK Party	Edib Berk; HDP	Mehmet Galip Ensarioğlu; AK Party
MP	Oslam Arslan; AK Party		Mehmet Süleyman Hamzaoğulları; AK Party	Feleknas Uca; HDP	
MP	Mehmet Mehdi Eker; AK Party			Çağlar Demirel; HDP	
MP	Ali İhsan Merdanoğlu; AK Party		Mine Lök Beyaz; AK Party	Ziya Pir; HDP	
MP	Cavit Torun; AK Party	Abdurrahman Kurt; AK Party	Oya Eronat; AK Party	İmam Taşçıer; HDP	
MP	Mehmet Fehmi Uyanık; AK Party	Akın Birdal; Independent	Leyla Zana; Independent	Sibel Yiğitalp; HDP	
MP	İrfan Riza Yazıcıoğlu; AK Party	Selahattin Demirtaş; Independent	Altan Tan; Independent / HDP		
MP	Mesut Değer; CHP	Gülten Kışanak; Independent	Emine Ayna; Independent	İdris Baluken; HDP	
MP	Muhsin Koçyiğit; CHP	Aysel Tuğluk; Independent	Nursel Aydoğan; Independent / HDP		
MP	No seat		Şerafettin Elçi; Independent / HDP	Nimetullah Erdoğmuş; HDP	

== General elections ==
=== 2011 ===
Abbr.	Party	Votes	%
DTP	Democratic Society Party	405,647	59.8%
AK Party	Justice and Development Party	217,746	32.1%
Independent	Mehmet Selim Ensarioğlu	19,436	2.9%
CHP	Republican People's Party	15,834	2.3%
MHP	Nationalist Movement Party	5,722	0.8%
	Other	14,074	2.1%
Total		678,459	
Turnout		81.41	
source: YSK

=== June 2015 ===
Abbr.	Party	Votes	%
HDP	Peoples' Democratic Party	636,915	79.1%
AK Party	Justice and Development Party	112,752	14%
HÜDA-PAR	Free Cause Party	27,537	3.4%
MHP	Nationalist Movement Party	8,491	1.1%
CHP	Republican People's Party	7,626	0.9%
	Other	12,331	1.5%
Total		805,652	
Turnout		86.90	
source: YSK

=== November 2015 ===
Abbr.	Party	Votes	%
HDP	Peoples' Democratic Party	576,318	72.8%
AK Party	Justice and Development Party	169,174	21.4%
CHP	Republican People's Party	12,335	1.6%
MHP	Nationalist Movement Party	4,962	0.6%
	Other	28,612	3.6%
Total		791,401	
Turnout		85.05	
source: YSK

=== 2018 ===
Abbr.	Party	Votes	%
HDP	Peoples' Democratic Party	554,172	67.1%
AK Party	Justice and Development Party	167,805	20.3%
HÜDA PAR	Free Cause Party	35,239	4.3%
IYI	Good Party	22,575	2.7%
CHP	Republican People's Party	16,562	2%
SP	Felicity Party	13,955	1.7%
MHP	Nationalist Movement Party	9,828	1.2%
	Other	6,106	0.7%
Total		826,242	
Turnout		84.05	
source: YSK

=== 2023 ===
Abbr.	Party	Votes	%
YSGP	Party of Greens and the Left Future	564.336	60.8%
AK Party	Justice and Development Party	215.076	23.2%
CHP	Republican People's Party	76.301	8.2%
IYI	Good Party	21.112	2.3%
YRP	New Welfare Party	14.395	1.6%
MHP	Nationalist Movement Party	13.739	1.5%
LEFT	Left Party	5.285	0.6%
	Other	17.263	1.9%
Total		937.335	
Turnout		81.72%	
source: YSK

== Presidential elections ==
=== 2018 ===
Electorate		Ballot boxes	
1.023.391		3.311	
Abbr.	Candidate	Votes	%
HDP	Selahattin Demirtaş	534.282	64.34
AK Party	Recep Tayyip Erdoğan	227.456	27.39
CHP	Muharrem İnce	51.274	6.17
IYI	Meral Akşener	8.424	1.01
SP	Temel Karamollaoğlu	8.028	0.97
PATRIOTIC	Doğu Perinçek	1.003	0.12
Total		830.467	
Invalid / blank		26.912	
Turnout		83.78	
source: HT

=== 2014 ===
2014 presidential election: Diyarbakır
Party	Candidate	Votes	%
HDP	Selahattin Demirtaş	510,390	79.82
AK Party	Recep Tayyip Erdoğan	114,115	17.86
Independent	Ekmeleddin İhsanoğlu	15,015	2.35
Total votes		639,520	100.00
Rejected ballots		10,977	1.69
Turnout		650,497	70.20
Selahattin Demirtaş win			
