= Selim Sadak =

Turkish politician (1954–2026)

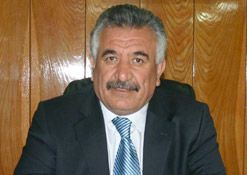

Member of the Grand National Assembly
- In office 14 November 1991 – 3 March 1994
- Constituency: Şırnak (1991)

Mayor of Siirt
- In office 29 March 2009 – 30 March 2014
- Preceded by: Mervan Gül
- Succeeded by: Tuncer Bakırhan

Personal details
- Born: Selim Sadak; 1954 Idil, Şırnak Province, Turkey
- Died: 23 January 2026 (aged 71) Heilbronn, Baden-Württemberg, Germany
- Party: HEP; DEP; DTP
- Children: 10
- Education: Diyarbakır Eğitim Enstitüsü

Selim Sadak (1954 – 23 January 2026) was a Turkish politician of Kurdish ethnicity.

== Background ==
Selim Sadak was born in İdil in 1954. He graduated from the Mathematics department of Diyarbakır Eğitim Enstitüsü. He then worked as a freelancer in Kurdish, English and Arabic.

He was married and had 10 children. Sadak died from cancer in Heilbronn, Germany, on 23 January 2026, at the age of 71.

== Political career ==
In the 1991 Turkey Parliamentary general election, he joined Leyla Zana, Mahmut Alınak, Hatip Dicle, Orhan Doğan, Ahmet Türk, Sırrı Sakık and Sedat Yurtdaş in the Social Democratic Populist Party (SHP) and was elected as the member of parliament for Şırnak in the 19th Parliament of Turkey. In March 1994, the parliamentary immunity was lifted from Selim Sadak, Orhan Dogan, Hatip Dicle and Leyla Zana. On 16 June 1994 the Democracy Party (DEP) was closed down by the Turkish Constitutional Court, and Selim Sadak, along with other members of the party, were put in prison. Based on a decision by the State Security Court he was sentenced to 15 years in prison in 1994. In April 2004 the European parliament condemned the imprisonment of Sadak and hoped for the quashing of the sentence in a resolution. He was released in June 2004 following a decision of Turkey's Appeal Court.

=== Later career and prosecution ===
Following his release from prison, Sadak toured the countryside testing the possibilities of founding a new party. At the time he saw it difficult a Kurdish party could be formed without referencing Öcalan. Sadak along with Leyla Zana and Hatip Dicle set up the Democratic Society Party (DTP) and was elected mayor of Siirt under the DTP, receiving 49,4% of the votes in the local elections in March 2009.

In December 2009, however, Turkey banned the DTP due to alleged links with the PKK and Selim Sadak as well as Ahmet Türk, Aysel Tuğluk, Leyla Zana and Nurettin Demirtaş, were banned from politics for five years. In 2010 he was dismissed by the Interior Ministry as Mayor of Siirt after a sentence of 10 months imprisonment from 2008 got confirmed, a decision he objected to. Then the Council of State Administrative Trials Board General Council overruled the decision of the Interior Ministry to dismiss Sadak and ruled he can stay Mayor of Siirt until the end of his term.

On 26 April 2010 he was sentenced to one year of imprisonment because he used the word Kurdistan and on 13 April to 10 months imprisonment for a photo depicted in a calendar of 2010.

In August 2011 he was sentenced in Siirt Criminal Court to five months in prison, a sentence which was later converted to a fine.

On 7 October 2011 he was sentenced in Diyarbakir court to one year and eight months prison for terrorist propaganda in relation to a speech that he made in 2007.
