= Leyla Zana =

Kurdish politician (born 1961)

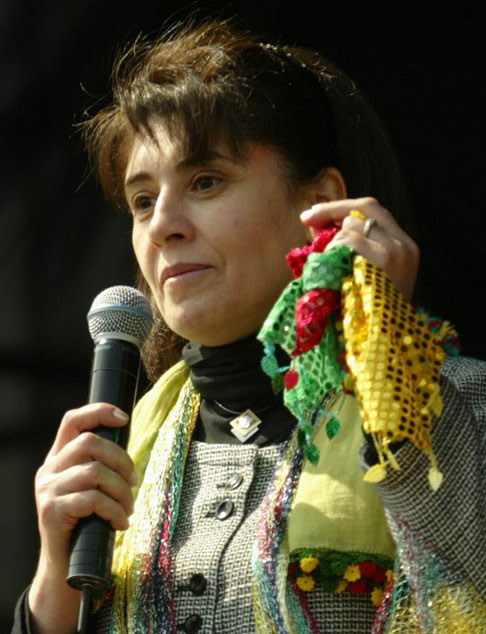
- Zana in 2007

Member of the Grand National Assembly
- In office 20 October 1991 – 30 June 1994
- Constituency: Diyarbakır (1991)
- In office 28 June 2011 – 11 January 2018
- Constituency: Diyarbakır (2011); Ağrı (June 2015, Nov 2015)

Personal details
- Born: 3 May 1961 (age 65) Silvan, Diyarbakır, Turkey
- Citizenship: Turkey
- Party: Democratic Society Party (2005–2009); Peoples' Democratic Party (2014–present)
- Spouse: Mehdi Zana (m. 1975; died 2026)
- Children: 2
- Occupation: Peace activist

Leyla Zana (born 3 May 1961) is a Kurdish politician in Turkey. She was imprisoned for ten years for her political activism, which was deemed by the Turkish courts to be against the unity of the country. She was awarded the 1995 Sakharov Prize by the European Parliament but was unable to collect it until her release in 2004. She was also awarded the Rafto Prize in 1994 after being recognized by the Rafto Foundation for being incarcerated for her peaceful struggle for the human rights of the Kurdish people in Turkey and the neighbouring countries.

== Early life ==
She was born to a Kurdish family in May 1961, in Silvan, Diyarbakır Province, in the southeast of Turkey. When she was 14 years old, she was married to her cousin Mehdi Zana, who became the mayor of Diyarbakır three years later in 1977 until the military coup d'état and a political prisoner after it.

== Political career ==
After the arrest of her husband Mehdi Zana, she and other relatives of prisoners tried to raise awareness of the prisoners' situation. Mehdi Zana was being prosecuted for publishing poetry in the Kurdish language. In 1987, Leyla Zana was arrested for the first time in two months for taking part in a rally against torture. In 1991 Zana was elected to the Grand National Assembly of Turkey on behalf of the Social Democratic Populist Party (SHP). She created a scandal when she spoke Kurdish on the floor of the parliament after being sworn in, even though it was known to be illegal. The Kurdish language, even when spoken in private, had been illegal for years in Turkey. Only in that year, 1991, was the Kurdish language finally legalized, though speaking Kurdish remained illegal in public spaces, as Zana was sworn in. Her remarks ended,

I swear by my honor and my dignity before the great Turkish people to protect the integrity and independence of the State, the indivisible unity of people and homeland, and the unquestionable and unconditional sovereignty of the people. I swear loyalty to the Constitution. I take this oath for the brotherhood between the Turkish people and the Kurdish people.

Only the final sentence of the oath was spoken in Kurdish: "I take this oath for the brotherhood between the Turkish people and the Kurdish people." In response to this, calls for her arrest blaming her for being a "Separatist" and "Terrorist" were heard in the Turkish parliament.

Although Zana's parliamentary immunity protected her, after she joined the Democracy Party, that party was banned and her immunity was stripped. After the MP Mehmet Sincar was assassinated during an investigation into unsolved political murders in 1993, she was one of the MPs who visited the relatives of Sincar in Kiziltepe. During her stay in Kiziltepe, a bomb exploded in the house she was staying, which left her unharmed, but wounded five women. In December 1994, along with three other Democracy Party MPs (Hatip Dicle, Selim Sadak, and Orhan Dogan), she was arrested and charged with treason and membership in the armed Kurdistan Workers Party (PKK) and wearing the colors red, green, yellow. The treason charges were not put before the court, and Zana denied PKK affiliation; but with the prosecution relying on witness statements allegedly obtained under torture, Zana and the others were sentenced to 15 years in prison. At her sentencing, she asserted,

This is a conspiracy. What I am defending is perfectly clear. I don’t accept any of these accusations. And, if they were true I’d assume responsibility for them, even if it cost me my life. I have defended democracy, human rights, and brotherhood between peoples. And I’ll keep doing so for as long as I live.

In 1998 her sentence was extended because of a letter she had written that was published in a Kurdish newspaper, which allegedly expressed banned pro-separatist views. While in prison she published a book titled Writings from Prison.

In 2001 the European Court of Human Rights ruled against Turkey after a review of her trial; although Turkey did not recognize the result, in 2003 a new harmonization law permitted retrials based on ECHR decisions. In April 2004, in a trial which the defendants frequently boycotted, their convictions and sentences were reaffirmed. On 9 June 2004, after a prosecutor requested quashing the prior verdict on a technicality, the High Court of Appeals ordered Zana and the other defendants be released.

In January 2005, the European Court of Human Rights awarded Zana and each of the other defendants €9000 from the Turkish government, ruling Turkey had violated her rights of free expression. Soon after Zana and others announced the new political formation Democratic Society Movement (DTH). On 17 August 2005, Democratic Society Party (DTP) was founded as the merger of Democratic People's Party (DEHAP) and DTH.

== Later political activities ==
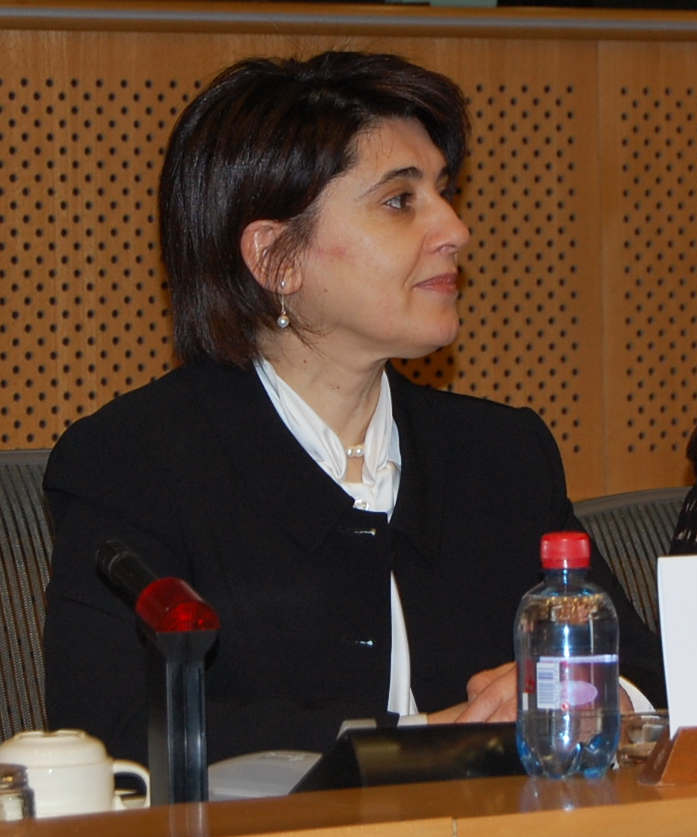
Leyla Zana, 2010

As of 2007, Zana is active in human rights issues in Turkey and working in the new party she co-founded in 2005. One controversial idea is her proposal to reorganize Turkey into a set of federal states, one of them being Kurdistan.

In April 2008, Zana was sentenced to two years in prison by Turkish authorities for allegedly "spreading terrorist propaganda" by saying in a speech that Kurds have three leaders, which she named as Massoud Barzani, Celal Talabanî and Abdullah Öcalan". Barzani was the president of the Kurdistan federal region in Iraq, Talabani was the ethnic Kurdish president of Iraq, and Öcalan is the imprisoned Kurdish leader of the Kurdistan Workers Party (PKK) in Turkey.

In December 2008, Zana was sentenced to another 10 years in prison by the Turkish court. The court ruled that she had violated the Turkish anti-terror law in nine different speeches. The European Union Turkey Civic Commission called on the European Union and the international community to take political action and strongly condemn Turkey for having convicted and sentenced Leyla Zana to ten new years in prison. Leyla Zana released the following statement to the EUTCC:

The case against me is a violation against freedom of thought, and represents a threat to every Kurd in Turkey. The decision of the court is just another way to repress, silence and punish the Kurds. The mentality governing this country is that problems can be resolved by anti-democratic and repressive means and that unfair trial can provide political and social peace. But despite all this, our people will claim their legitimate rights, and will continue to struggle for this as long as it takes.

On 28 July 2009, a Court in Diyarbakır sentenced Leyla Zana to 15 months in prison because of a speech she had made at the School of Oriental and African Studies (SOAS) of the University of London for remarks on Abdullah Öcalan. These prison sentences were overturned by higher courts.

In December 2009, the Constitutional Court banned the DTP due to alleged links with the PKK and Leyla Zana, as well as Ahmet Türk, Aysel Tuğluk, Nurettin Demirtaş, Selim Sadak and 30 other Kurdish politicians were banned from politics for five years. While this decision forbids them to be members of political parties, it does not prevent them from being elected to the parliament as independent deputies.

She was re-elected to parliament in the 12 June 2011, and on 1 July 2012, Prime Minister Recep Tayyip Erdoğan met Leyla Zana in his office. This meeting took place after a recent Hürriyet interview in which Leyla Zana said she was hopeful that Prime Minister Recep Tayyip Erdoğan would solve the Kurdish–Turkish conflict. Her words were criticized as 'naive' by the BDP leadership, but were welcomed by the Turkish government.

She was re-elected in June 2015, and the snap elections of November 2015. After her election in November 2015, she spoke again some Kurdish words, and also used "people of Turkey" instead of "Turkish people" which caused the speaker of the parliament to invalidate her oath and seat in parliament.

In November 2016, Zana was temporarily arrested along with other lawmakers from BDP/HDP, again accused of affiliation with the PKK. In February 2017 she was again shortly detained and questioned over an investigation into alleged terrorism related charges.

In July 2017, Zana's HDP deputy seat was under AKP-led parliamentary review and potential exclusion for "failing to properly take her oath of office, as well as rampant absenteeism".

On 11 January 2018, Zana's parliamentary membership was revoked for missing 212 parliamentary sessions from October 2016 to April 2017 by a 302–22 vote in the Turkish Parliament, with CHP and HDP MPs in attendance voting against. On 17 March 2021, the state prosecutor to the Court of Cassation Bekir Şahin filed a lawsuit to the Constitutional Court which demanded that she and 686 other HDP politicians have a five-year ban for a political participation together with a closure of the HDP due to their alleged organizational links to the PKK.

== Awards and recognition ==
- Rafto Prize in 1995
- Sakharov Prize in 1995
- Bruno Kreisky Prize for Services to Human Rights in 1995
- Honorary citizenship of the City of Geneva
- Aachen Peace Prize in 1995
- She was also recognized as a prisoner of conscience by Amnesty International.
- In 2002, a film named The Back of the World, directed by Spanish-Peruvian filmmaker Javier Corcuera, examined her imprisonment.

== See also ==
- Human rights in Turkey
