= Cevheri (surname) =

Cevheri is a Turkish surname. Notable people with the surname include:

- Necmettin Cevheri (1930–2023), Turkish lawyer and politician
- Sabahattin Cevheri (born 1950), Turkish politician
