= Sibel Yiğitalp =

Turkish politician

Sibel Yigitalp

Member of the Grand National Assembly of Turkey
- In office June 2015 – 2018
- Constituency: Diyrabakır

Personal details
- Born: 1 February 1971 (age 55) Mardin
- Party: HDP
- Education: Ondokuz Mayıs University

Sibel Yiğitalp (1 February 1971, Mardin, Turkey) is a Turkish politician of Kurdish descent and a former member of the Grand National Assembly of Turkey for the People's Democratic Party (HDP).

== Early life and education ==
Sibel Yiğitalp was born in Mardin and studied Health Sciences at the Ondokuz Mayıs University from where she graduated with a master's degree. Onwards she worked as a manager in various healthcare institutions. She was a member of the Democratic Society Congress (DTK) and the Health Workers Union.

== Political career ==
In the Parliamentary Elections of June 2015 she was elected to the Grand National Assembly of Turkey representing Diyarbakir for the HDP. She was re-elected in the snap elections in November 2015.

=== Political views ===
As an MP she defended the rights of the Kurds during the curfews in 2016 demanding answers to the imposition of curfews in the Diyarbakir province and attempted to visit the by a curfew affected locality of Silvan together with the Diyarbakir Bar Association. She also opposed the dismissal of elected Kurdish Mayors.

=== Legal prosecution ===
In August 2017, a state prosecutor demanded that her parliamentary immunity be removed. In April 2018, another investigation into the lifting of her parliamentary immunity was initiated. In January 2019, Yigitalp was accused of terror related charges for which the prosecution demanded between 10 and 26 years imprisonment. She left Turkey for Germany, from where received support from the Die Linke. The State Prosecutor at the Court of Cassation in Turkey Bekir Şahin filed a lawsuit before the Constitutional Court on the 17 March 2021, demanding for Yiğitalp and 686 other HDP politicians a five-year ban for political activities in Turkey. The lawsuit was filed jointly with a request for the HDP to be shut down due to the parties alleged organizational links with the Kurdistan Workers' Party (PKK).

== Personal life ==
She is married and has two children.
