= Çağlar Demirel =

Kurdish politician

Member of the Grand National Assembly of Turkey
- In office 2015–2016

Personal details
- Born: 29 July 1969 (age 57) Kulp, Diyarbakır
- Party: HDP
- Education: Dicle University

Çağlar Demirel (born 29 July 1969, Kulp, Turkey) is a Kurdish politician and a former member of the Grand National Assembly of Turkey of the Peoples' Democratic Party (HDP).

== Early life and education ==
Çağlar Demirel was born in Kulp, Diyarbakır province. She enrolled into the Dicle University where she studied nursing and graduated in 1995. Thereafter, she was an adviser on health care for several women and governmental institutions in Turkey and was involved in a variety of NGO's focusing on women's rights.

== Political career ==
She was elected as the Mayor of Derik, Mardin in the municipal elections of 2009 for the Democratic Society Party (DTP). After DTP was banned in December 2009 she joined Peace and Democracy Party (BDP). She was detained together with more than 100 other politicians of the BDP in October 2011 due to an investigation into the activities of the Kurdistan Communities Union (KCK). While in prison, she joined a hunger strike in protest of the detention conditions of Abdullah Öcalan, the detained leader of the Kurdistan Workers' Party (PKK). She was elected to the Turkish parliament in the general elections of June 2015 and re-elected In the snap elections of November 2015, both times representing the HDP for Diarbakir. Following, she became the vice-chair of the HDP parliamentarian group. As such, she supported the peace process between the Turkish Government and the PKK.

== Legal prosecution ==
On the 14 December 2016 Bianet reported that Demirel was arrested and prosecuted for membership in propagandizing for a terrorist organization. In July 2017, she was sentenced to 7 years and 6 months imprisonment for being a member of a terrorist organization. On the 17 March 2021, the State Prosecutor before the Court of Cassation Bekir Şahin filed a lawsuit before the Constitutional Court demanding for Demirel and 686 other HDP politicians a five-year ban to engage in politics together with a closure of the HDP due to their alleged organizational links with the PKK. In September 2021, the Court of Cassation ordered a retrial and Demirel was released.
