= Ufuk Uras =

Turkish politician

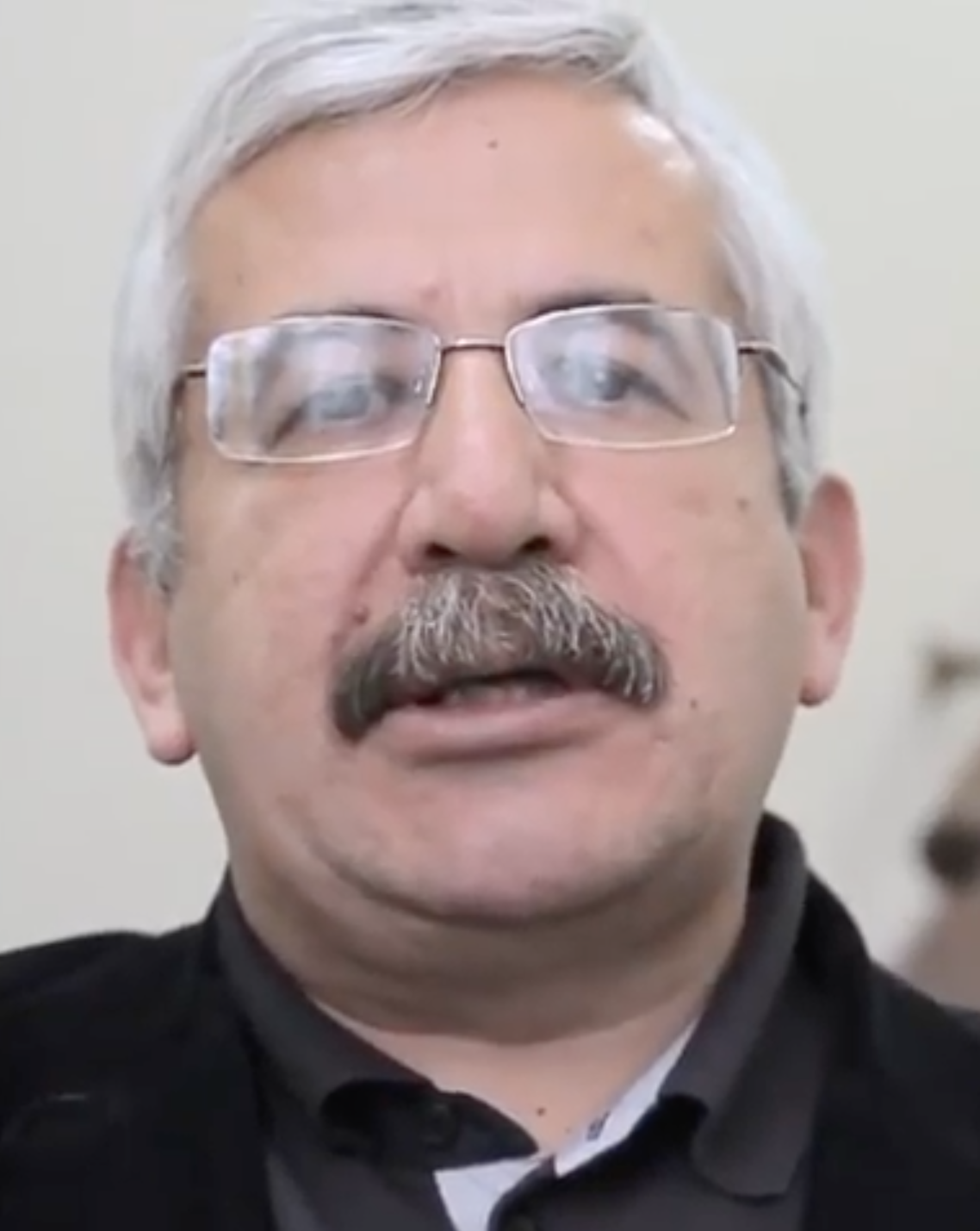
Image of Ufuk Uras

Mehmet Ufuk Uras (Turkish pronunciation: [uˈfuk uˈɾas]; born 4 January 1959, in Üsküdar, Istanbul, Turkey) is a Turkish politician and economist.

== Biography and political career ==
Uras graduated from the Faculty of Economics of Istanbul University and began working as an academician at the same institution. A former leader of the now-defunct University Lecturers' Union (Öğretim Elemanları Sendikası), he was elected the chairman of Freedom and Solidarity Party (ÖDP) in 1996. Uras resigned from the leadership after the 2002 general election. He became the party chairman again in 2007.

=== 2007 elections and after ===
Uras ran a successful campaign as an independent and a "common candidate of the Left" within the Thousand Hopes alliance, backed by Kurdish-based Democratic Society Party and several left-wing, environmentalist and pro-peace groups in the 2007 general election, polling 81,486 votes, which is approximately 4 per cent of the vote in his constituency. After having elected as an independent to the parliament he rejoined the ÖDP.

He was removed from his post as the ÖDP party leader in 2009, when his opponent Hayri Kozanoğlu was elected. He resigned from the Freedom and Solidarity Party on 19 June 2009.

After the Democratic Society Party was dissolved in December 2009 and two of its MPs were banned from politics for five years, he joined forces with the remaining Kurdish MPs in the Peace and Democracy Party group, giving them the twenty seats necessary to retain their position as a parliamentary party.

=== Post-parliamentarian political life ===
Uras did not run in the 2011 general election. On 25 November 2012, he became a co-founder and member of Greens and the Left Party of the Future, founded as a merger of the Greens and the Equality and Democracy Party.

The Greens and Left Party backed the Kurdish-led Peoples' Democratic Party (HDP) in the 2015 elections. Uras called for the HDP to move closer to Syriza as a political party model, with a more libertarian perspective.

== Personal life ==
Uras is married to ballet dancer and choreographer Zeynep Tanbay. Uras has a son named Deniz from a former marriage.

== Books ==
- ÖDP Söyleşileri, 1999, Istanbul: Alan. ISBN 975-7414-77-8
- Başka Bir Siyaset Mümkün, 2003, Istanbul: İthaki. ISBN 975-8725-79-3
- İdeolojilerin Sonu mu?, 2004, Istanbul: Çiviyazıları. ISBN 975-8663-66-6
- Sezgiciliğin Sonu mu?, 2005, Istanbul: Devin. ISBN 975-6472-16-2
- Siyaset Yazıları, 2005, Istanbul: Alan. ISBN 975-7414-95-6
- Alternatif Siyaset Arayışları, 2005, Istanbul: İthaki. ISBN 975-273-148-1
- "Kurtuluş Savaşı'nda Sol", 2007, İstanbul: Altın Kitaplar. ISBN 978-975-21-0836-3
- "Sokaktan Parlamentoya Özgürlükçü Siyaset İçin Notlar", 2008, İstanbul: Su Yayınları. ISBN 978-975-6709-67-2
- "Söz Meclisten Dışarı", 2010, Ankara: Penta Yayınları. ISBN 978-975-01020-7-3
- "Meclis Notları", 2013, İstanbul: Pencere Yayınları. ISBN 978-605-4049-60-8
- "Velhasıl",2018, İstanbul, Doğan Kitap.
