= Suat Kınıklıoğlu =

Turkish politician, writer and analyst (born 1965)

Member of the Grand National Assembly of Turkey
- In office 22 July 2007 – 12 June 2011
- Constituency: Çankırı

Personal details
- Born: 1 May 1965 (age 61) Duisburg, Germany
- Party: Justice and Development Party (2007–2012)
- Other political affiliations: Democratic Left Party (1995–1996)
- Children: 2
- Education: Turkish Air Force Academy; Carleton University; Bilkent University
- Occupation: Politician, writer, analyst, think tank director

Suat Kınıklıoğlu (born 1 May 1965) is a Turkish politician, writer, analyst and think tank director.

In May 2026 He became the general manager of Metropoll Strategic and Social Research, Turkey's most renown public polling company.

Kınıklıoğlu was elected as a Member of Parliament for Çankırı from the Justice and Development Party (AKP) in the general election of 22 July 2007. During his parliamentary term (2007–2011) he served as spokesman of the foreign affairs committee, member of the Turkish Group in the NATO Parliamentary Assembly and chairman of the Turkey–USA Interparliamentary Friendship Group. He also held the positions of AKP deputy chairman for external affairs and member of the party's Central Decision and Executive Committee.

In 2012 he resigned from the AKP and became a public critic of the party. In 2014 he managed the election campaign of the main opposition CHP candidate for Ankara mayor, Mansur Yavaş.

== Early life and education ==
Kınıklıoğlu was born on 1 May 1965 in Duisburg, Germany. He graduated from the Turkish Air Force Academy (1982–1986) and served as a communications officer in the Turkish Air Force (1986–1989). He earned a B.A. in political science with high honors from Carleton University, Ottawa (1990–1994), an M.A. in international relations from Bilkent University, Ankara (1996–1999) and a PhD in political science from Bilkent University.

Before entering parliament he worked as political adviser at the Australian Embassy in Ankara, Turkey & Caucasus representative for the Canadian International Development Agency (2002–2004), foreign policy correspondent for the newspaper Yeni Yüzyıl, columnist for Turkish Daily News and editor of the English-language foreign policy journal Insight Turkey (2002–2007) and founding executive director of the German Marshall Fund of the United States’ Ankara office (2005–2007). He also founded the Ankara Center for Foreign Policy Research.

== Post-parliamentary career ==
Since leaving parliament Kınıklıoğlu has been executive director of the Ankara-based think tank Center for Strategic Communication (STRATIM) (since 2011). He is also a senior research fellow at the Institute for Security and Development Policy (ISDP) in Stockholm and a senior non-resident fellow at the Center for Applied Turkey Studies (CATS) at SWP Berlin. He has held several international fellowships, including senior fellow at the Center for American Progress (2014), resident fellow at the University of Chicago Institute of Politics (2015), and academic visitor at the University of Oxford Middle East Centre (2018–2019).

He is a member of the European Council on Foreign Relations (since 2013) and writes regular columns on Turkish domestic and foreign policy for international outlets including the Financial Times, The Washington Post, The Wall Street Journal and The Guardian.

He speaks Turkish, English, German and some Russian.

He is married and has two children.

== Education and professional career ==
Suat Kınıklıoğlu graduated from the Turkish Air Force Academy (Electronics) in 1986 and from Carleton University’s Political Science Department with High Honors in 1994. Kınıklıoğlu received his Master in International Relations degree in 1999 at Bilkent University, Ankara.

Mr. Kınıklıoğlu specializes in Turkish foreign policy, Turkish-Russian relations and Turkey's strategic identity.

Mr. Kınıklıoğlu gave Turkish politics seminars at the Institute of Politics of Chicago University in 2015. He was an academic visitor at Oxford University's Middle East Center in 2018 and a senior fellow at the Center for Applied Turkey Studies (CATS) of the German Institute for International and Security Affairs in 2020–21.

Kınıklıoğlu wrote as a columnist in Turkish Daily News, was editor-in-chief of the foreign policy journal Insight Turkey and wrote for Radikal Daily as a columnist. Since 2024 he writes a weekly column for Medyascope (Turkish).

In 2006 Kınıklıoğlu received the Sakıp Sabancı International Research Award. In 2013 he was invited to become a member of the European Council on Foreign Relations. Kınıklıoğlu is a regular contributor to the international media including the Financial Times, Washington Post, Wall Street Journal, International Herald Tribune and the Guardian.

He comments frequently to the Turkish and international media on Turkish domestic and foreign policy issues.

Apart from his native Turkish Mr. Kınıklıoğlu speaks English, German and some Russian.

== Select bibliography ==
- Eurasianism in Turkey, SWP Research Paper, 22 March 2022
- "Turkey's Self-Inflicted Disaster". New York Times. 19 October 2015.
- "Turkey's Hapless Opposition". Foreign Policy. 4 December 2015.
- "Turkey's Neighbourhood Policy: Reintegration into Multiple Regions". What Does Turkey Think?. 2011.
- Kiniklioglu, Suat (2011). "Turkey's Neighbourhood Policy: Reintegration into Multiple Regions". In Dimitar Bechev (ed.). What Does Turkey Think. London: European Council on Foreign Relations. pp. 63–68.
- "A Little Respect, Please". International Herald Tribune. 22 January 2010.
- "Getting Turkey right". The New York Times. 2 May 2007.
- "There are limits to patience and optimism". Financial Times. 16 December 2004.
