= Sevahir Bayındır =

Turkish politician

Sevahir Bayındır (* 1 January 1969, Karlıova, Bingöl Province, Turkey) is a Kurdish MP for the Democratic Society Party (DTP) in Şırnak, Eastern Turkey.

Bayındır attended high school in Trabzon, going on to study nursing at the Ege University School of Nursing in İzmir. Between 1991 and 1997 she worked as a nurse in Izmir. She was a co-founder of the Democratic People's Party (DEHAP), which she chaired from 1998 to 2002. Since 2002 she has been active in the Rainbow Women's Association.

In 1999 she stood as candidate of HADEP in Diyarbakir and in 2002 for DEHAP in Mersin. Both times she was unsuccessful. In July 2007, Bayındır stood as an independent candidate within the DTP supported Thousand Hopes alliance for the Turkish parliamentary elections and was elected to the Turkish Parliament. She was the first woman to represent Şırnak. In June 2009 she brought a motion that a committee investigating child labour be formed. In 2012 an arrest warrant was issued for Bayındır due to a speech she held in Şırnak. The prosecution demanded a 5-year prison sentence, but she did not attend the hearing and was believed to have travelled to Europe.
