= Bengi Yıldız =

Turkish politician (born 1965)

Member of the Grand National Assembly
- In office 2007–2014
- Constituency: Batman (2007, 2011)

Personal details
- Born: 15 November 1965 (age 60) Kozluk, Batman Province,
- Education: Istanbul University

Bengi Yildiz (born 15 November 1965 in Kozluk, Batman Province, Turkey) was a Member of Parliament of the Peace and Democracy Party (BDP) for Batman, Turkey.

Bengi Yildiz is a lawyer by training, graduating from Istanbul University Law Faculty, and has worked as a journalist for the newspapers Gündem, Demokrasi, Ülkeden Özgür Gündem.

He is a former president of the Batman branch of the Turkish Human Rights Association (IHD).

In July 2007, he stood as an independent candidate for the Democratic Society Party (DTP) supported Thousand Hopes alliance in the Turkish parliamentary elections and entered the Turkish Parliament as an MP for Batman, joining the DTP. He was a member of the Turkey EU Joint parliamentary committee.

He was re-elected in the 12 June 2011 general election.

He is married with two children.

On 25 July 2011 he declared that Kurds under the control of PKK/BDP would stop paying taxes to the Turkish government. He suggested that PKK/BDP would form a Libyan Jumhuriya type of structure whereby in every neighborhood and city the PKK/BDP supported Kurds would locally organize and abolish political parties to create a "self-determined democratic" autonomy. He furthermore suggested that although PKK/BDP supported Kurds want to be exempt from taxes it is still the responsibility of the Turkish Republic to invest in their infrastructure, roads, schools and pay for their public servants.

During his term as MP, he was an outspoken supporter of speaking the Kurdish language. This drew criticism from Turkish Parliament Speaker Mehmet Ali Sahin from the Justice and Development Party (AKP), reminding him that to speak Kurdish was not allowed according to Article 81 of the Political Parties Law.
