= Hamit Geylani =

Turkish politician (1947–2025)

Member of the Grand National Assembly
- In office 23 June 2007 – 28 June 2011
- Constituency: Hakkari (2007)

Personal details
- Born: 1 July 1947; Şemdinli, Hakkari, Turkey
- Died: 28 May 2025 (aged 77); Çankaya, Ankara, Turkey
- Political party: BDP
- Education: Ankara University, Law School
- Occupation: Lawyer

Hamit Geylani (1 July 1947 – 28 May 2025) was a Turkish politician. A member of the Peace and Democracy Party, he served in the Grand National Assembly from 2007 to 2011.

Geylani died in Çankaya District on 28 May 2025, at the age of 77.
