= Sabahattin Cevheri =

Turkish politician

Sabahattin Cevheri (born 1 January 1950 in Şanlıurfa, Turkey) is a Turkish politician and member of Turkish Parliament. He is a member of the Justice and Development Party (AKP).

He is a member of the Kurdish origin Şeyhanlı tribe. He graduated from Gazi University's Department of Economic and Business Sciences, and he was a deputy in the Turkish Parliament for Şanlıurfa.

He is married and has three children.
