= Akın Birdal =

Turkish politician (born 1948)

- Born: 2 January 1948 (age 78); Niğde, Niğde Province, Turkey
- Education: Ankara University; Gazi University
- Political party: Peace and Democracy Party (2009–2011)
- Other political affiliations: Socialist Democratic Party (2002); Democratic Society Party (2007–2009)

Akın Birdal (born 2 January 1948, Niğde, Niğde Province, Turkey) is a Turkish human rights activist and politician. He was a member of the Grand National Assembly of Turkey for the Democratic Society Party (DTP) (2007 to 2009) and the Peace and Democracy Party (BDP) from 2009 to 2011. He is an honorary President of the Human Rights Association of Turkey (IHD), having been its chair from 1992 to 1998. He has published a number of essays and short stories. He is married with two children.

== Education and early life ==
Birdal is an agricultural engineer by training, graduating from Ankara University Faculty of Agriculture, Soil Science Department. He went on to do a master's degree in business at the Gazi University from where he graduated in 1973. As a university student, he was involved in several agricultural associations. His academic career, begun in 1979, was cut short by the 1980 Turkish coup d'état, and for a time he made a living running a grocery store.

=== Political career and human rights ===
Birdal co-founded the Human Rights Association of Turkey in 1986, and became its Secretary-General. He was elected its chairman in 1992. On 3 September 1996 he was detained accused of collaborating with the PKK for being part of a delegation who wanted to negotiate the release of Turkish soldiers captured by the PKK. Eight captive soldiers were released. In December 1996 he was acquitted from the charges of collaborating with the PKK. In 1997 Birdal and others were investigated or detained for supporting a peace initiative for the Kurdish Turkish conflict called the Musa Anter peace train. In December the same year Birdal was acquitted from the charges relating to his support for the peace train. On 12 May 1998, Birdal barely survived an assassination attempt, when two assailants fired 13 shots at him in the office of the association. The Turkish Revenge Brigade claimed responsibility. In 1999 he was sentenced to 20 months' imprisonment under Article 312 (of which he served 14 months) for speeches made in 1995 and 1996. In his speeches, he was in favor of a peaceful solution in the conflict between Turkey and the PKK. He was released on medical reasons on 25 September 1999, but on 30 March 2000 a court ruled he must serve the rest of the sentence in prison. In the year 1999 he was adopted as a prisoner of conscience by Amnesty International. In 2007 the European Court of Human Rights ruled that the case breached Article 10 of the European Convention on Human Rights, as well as Article 6.1 (right to a fair trial).

In 2002 Birdal was one of the founders of the Socialist Democratic Party, becoming its chairman, but stepped down after becoming Vice President of the International Federation for Human Rights.

In July 2007, he stood as an independent candidate in the Turkish parliamentary elections and entered the Turkish Parliament, representing Diyarbakır. His candidacy was supported by the Thousand Hopes Candidates alliance. Following his election, he joined the Democratic Society Party (DTP) and for the Municipal Elections of March 2009, he was the DTP candidate for the Mayorship of Istanbul but he was not elected. Later in 2009, he joined the Peace and Democracy Party (BDP).

== Awards ==
- Jaime Brunet Prize for Human Rights (1999)
