= Ayla Akat Ata =

Kurdish politician of the Peace and Democracy Party (BDP) in Batman, Turkey

Member of the Grand National Assembly
- In office 2007–2015
- Constituency: Batman (2007, 2011)

Personal details
- Born: Ayla Akat Ata; February 16, 1976 (age 50) Diyarbakır, Turkey
- Children: 1
- Education: Dicle University

Ayla Akat Ata (born 16 February 1976) is a Kurdish lawyer and former member of the Grand National Assembly of Turkey of the Peace and Democracy Party (BDP). She is a women's rights activist and the co-founder of the Free Women's Congress (KJA). Besides she was also involved in the negotiations between the Kurdistan Workers' Party (PKK) and the Turkish Government in 2013.

== Early life and education ==
Ayla Akat Ata was born in Diyarbakır in 1976. Since graduating from the Faculty of Law at Dicle University in Diyarbakır, she has been working as a lawyer. She is a member of the Turkish Human Rights Association (İHD), and a co-founder of the Free Women's Congress (KJA), which is organized through an assembly of 501 members.

== Political career ==
In July 2007, she stood as an independent candidate in the Turkish parliamentary elections and entered the Turkish Parliament, joining the Democratic Society Party (DTP). After the DTP was banned on 11 December 2009, she joined the Peace and Democracy Party (BDP).

She was re-elected in the 12 June 2011 general election. In January 2013 she was involved in the peace process between the Kurdistan Workers' Party (PKK) and the Turkish Government and met with Abdullah Öcalan in İmralı prison together with Ahmet Türk. In 2015, she unsuccessfully demanded the abolition of the article 299 of the Turkish Penal Code, which criminalizes insulting the Turkish president.

=== Legal prosecution ===
In September 2007, she and Aysel Tuğluk were charged with “conducting propaganda for an outlawed organization” and “aiding and abetting a terrorist organization.” On the 26 October 2016, she was detained and later arrested while attending a protest against the dismissal of the Co-Mayors Gültan Kışanak and Fırat Anlı and accused of "managing a terrorist organization" also due to her activities in the Democratic Society Congress (DTK). She was released on the 4 May 2017. She was re-arrested in February 2018 for a speech she gave in relation of Kamber Moroç who had died as Turkish soldiers opened fire on a bus. In this case she was released in May 2018. In September 2020, she was detained with other 82 politicians over accusations that she supported the Kobanî protests in 2014, which were in support of the Kurdish population besieged in Kobanî by the Islamic State of Iraq and the Levant (ISIL).
