= Fatma Kurtulan =

Kurdish politician

Member of the Grand National Assembly
- In office 8 July 2018 – 14 May 2023
- Constituency: Mersin (2018)
- In office 10 August 2007 – 12 June 2011
- Constituency: Van (2007)

Personal details
- Born: March 1, 1964 (age 62) Kahramanmaraş, Turkey
- Party: Peoples' Democratic Party
- Occupation: Politician

Fatma Kurtulan (born 1 March 1964, Kahramanmaras, Turkey) is a Kurdish politician of the Peoples' Democratic Party (HDP) in Turkey.

After graduating from Pazarcık high school, Kurtulan worked on social projects in the Küçükdikili municipality in Adana. A former president of the women's branch of People's Democracy Party (HADEP), in July 2007, Kurtulan stood as an independent candidate in the Turkish parliamentary elections and entered the Turkish Parliament (Grand National Assembly of Turkey). She then joined the Democratic Society Party (DTP).

On 9 November 2007 the Turkish chief public prosecutor launched an investigation into her activities, after she visited Iraq with two other DTP politicians to obtain the release of eight Turkish soldiers held by Kurdistan Workers' Party (PKK) forces. The prosecutor requested that the Turkish Parliament remove the parliamentary immunity of all three MPs.

In the same month she admitted being married to a PKK member, adding that her husband, Samlan Kurtulan, who the media reported to be in a PKK guerrilla camp in northern Iraq, had been away for 13 years and that she remained married only on paper.

In May 2009 she called for an investigation into police violence against children.

In January 2012 she was arrested in connection with the KCK trials and subsequently sentenced to 10 Months in prison in April 2012 She was a candidate for the HDP in the Parliamentary Election 2018 and was elected MP for Mersin.
