= Nurettin Demirtaş =

Turkish politician (born 1972)

President of the DTP
- In office December 2007 – May 2008
- Preceded by: Ahmet Türk, Aysel Tuğluk
- Succeeded by: Ahmet Türk, Emine Ayna

Personal details
- Born: 1972 (age 53–54) Elazığ, Turkey
- Party: Democratic Society Party
- Military career
- Allegiance: Turkey
- Branch: Gendarmerie General Command
- Service years: 2008-2009

Nurettin Demirtaş (born 1972) was a former Kurdish politician of the Democratic Society Party (DTP) in Turkey and a member of the Kurdistan Workers' Party (PKK).

== Early life and education ==
He grew up and attended secondary school in Diyarbakır. He then studied business at university in Muğla, where he was arrested in 1993 for his political activities. He spent the following 12 years in prison. After his release he became the founding president of an association for the development of civil society. On 28 May 2006 he was arrested after having attended a funeral of members of the PKK and spent 4 months in prison.

== Political career ==
He was elected the vice-president in February 2007 and president of the DTP on 9 December 2007, at the party's second general assembly. As a politician he was a peace activist and in September 2007, he and Selma Irmak were prosecuted for having mistreated the Turkish nation for having distributed leaflets criticizing the Turkish military on International World Peace Day. The investigation over a violating the Article 301 of the Turkish penal code was dismissed only in May 2008.

On 17 December 2007 he was arrested on his return from a European tour and imprisoned on charges of forging a document to evade military conscription. He was released 28 April 2008 by a military court and enlisted in the army the following day. Turkish men are required to serve in the army for up to 15 months after the age of 20 unless they have health problems that prevent them from fulfilling military duty. In May 2008 he resigned from the presidency of the DTP. On 9 November 2009 he was sentenced to 6 years and 3 months for having attended a funeral of PKK militants, a sentence he appealed.

Later Demirtaş left Turkey and joined the PKK. Anadolu agency reported its armed forces had wounded Nurettin in 2015.

He published an article which praised the PKK militant Seher Çağla Demir, the terrorist attacker who committed a suicide bombing in Ankara Kızılay. The attack resulted in 36 civilian deaths and 125 were wounded. In this article titled "Time for Doğa (Nature) !", where the code name "Doğa" referred to Seher Çağla Demir who organized the attack, Demirtaş argued that the Kızılay attack was a right action and that the suicide attacker Seher Çağla Demir was the pride and honor of humanity.

Selahattin Demirtaş is his brother and former chairman of HDP.
