= Democratic Society Party =

Democratic Society Party Kurdish: Partiya Civaka Demokratîk Turkish: Demokratik Toplum Partisi
- Leader: Ahmet Türk, Emine Ayna, Aysel Tuğluk, Nurettin Demirtaş
- Founded: 17 August 2005
- Banned: 12 December 2009
- Merger of: Democratic People's Party; Democratic Society Movement
- Succeeded by: Peace and Democracy Party
- Headquarters: Barış Manço Cad. 32. Sk. No:37, Balgat – Ankara
- Ideology: Social democracy Kurdish nationalism Left-wing nationalism
- Political position: Left-wing
- National affiliation: Thousand Hope Candidates
- European affiliation: Party of European Socialists (associate member)
- International affiliation: Socialist International (observer member)
- Colors: Red, Green and Yellow

Website
- (archived)

The Democratic Society Party (Turkish: Demokratik Toplum Partisi, DTP, Kurdish: Partiya Civaka Demokratîk, PCD) was a Kurdish nationalist political party in Turkey. The party considered itself social-democratic and had observer status in the Socialist International. It was considered to be the successor of the Democratic People's Party (DEHAP). The party was established in 2005 and succeeded in getting elected more than ninety mayors in the municipal elections of 2009. On 11 December 2009, the Constitutional Court of Turkey banned the DTP, ruling that the party has become "focal point of activities against the indivisible unity of the state, the country and the nation". The ban has been widely criticized both by groups within Turkey and by several international organizations. The party was succeeded by the Peace and Democracy Party.

== History ==
The party was founded in 2005, as the merger of the DEHAP and the Democratic Society Movement (DTH). DTH was set up by the veteran Kurdish politicians, former deputies Leyla Zana, Orhan Doğan, Hatip Dicle and Selim Sadak upon their release from prison in 2004. The party adopted a gender quota of 40% and the co-chair system on all decision making party levels. Ahmet Türk and Aysel Tuğluk were elected as the first co-chairs of the party. The party assumed the solving of the Kurdish question and a democratization of Turkey would also lead to the spread of democracy in the Middle East. Further it demanded the acceptance of the Kurdish identity in the constitution and education in the Kurdish language.

On 9 November 2007, Ahmet Türk and Aysel Tuğluk were replaced by Nurettin Demirtaş and Emine Ayna. However, Nurettin Demirtaş was imprisoned the following month because of a fake health report that enabled him to avoid military service. In May 2008, Nurettin Demirtaş was forced to resign after being released from prison and conscripted into the Turkish Army. Emine Ayna, MP for Mardin, was elected leader of the DTP in his place. Later in May, Ayna also became Chair of the DTP Parliamentary Group, when Ahmet Türk resigned. However, in July 2008 Ahmet Türk became, once again, chairman of the DTP.

=== Peace process ===
The AKP Government initiated a peace process in 2009 under the leadership of the Interior Minister Beşir Atalay. Despite the fact that the opposition parties of the Nationalist Movement Party (MHP) and the Republican People's Party (CHP) would raise concerns over the ethnic and national unity of the state, the Kurdistan Workers' Party (PKK) and the AKP carried on with the peace process. In October 2009, thirty-four PKK militants entered Turkey on the request of Abdullah Öcalan, the imprisoned leader of the PKK. They surrendered to the Turkish authorities as a sign for the PKK support of the Government plans for greater Kurdish rights. The group was welcomed by a crowd of PKK supporters and several DTP politicians. The DTP supported an amnesty for the PKK militants and Ahmet Türk also reckoned that the PKK was in favor of peace and not war. The Turkish government was not pleased with the celebrated welcome, the PKK militants received and detained over 400 high ranking DTP politicians. Following a deadly attack on Turkish soldiers by PKK militants on 7 December 2009, the peace process was over.

=== International outreach ===
The party maintained an office in Brussels, Belgium, to engage into negotiations with politicians in the European Union.

== October 2007 congress ==
In October 2007, the DTP organized a Democratic Society Congress during which several reforms for more political and cultural rights within a so-called Democratic Autonomy were announced. The party demanded more liberties for the expression of non-Turkish languages, especially the Kurdish language. The party wanted a more decentralized style of government and supported the implementation of an administrative structure adapted to the local population. The aim was the implementation of a government in which allowed the cultural differences of the regions to emerge. Besides, the country should be divided into several autonomous regions and the decision making process be based on a local parliamentary system.

== PKK connections and disbanding ==
=== Connection with the PKK ===
Since its inception, the party and its leaders have faced legal problems with the Turkish government since some critics suspect the party of having ties to the PKK.

It was also criticized by observers for not distancing itself from PKK's armed actions to confirm its refutations of its claimed links with the PKK. A report from June 2007 by the European Union Institute for Security Studies (EUISS) stated that "It is an obvious secret that DTP is connected to PKK in a way and PKK is a terrorist group."

A delegation consisting of the DTP MP's Fatma Kurtalan, Osman Özçelik and Aysel Tuğluk traveled to Northern Iraq to mediate the release of 8 arrested Turkish soldiers by the PKK in 2007. This visit sparked outrage in Turkey since Fatma Kurtulans husband is an active PKK member. She defended her visit that she has not seen him for the past 13 years and they effectively are only married on paper.

In October 2007, in a meeting of the ambassadors of the EU countries and the U.S. to Turkey, it was reported that the diplomats pressured the DTP to denounce the PKK as terrorist, following a DTP-sponsored conference, whose final declaration called the imprisoned PKK leader, Abdullah Öcalan, a "leader of the Kurdish people" and called for his release. In November 2007, Devlet Bahçeli of the MHP called for the lifting of the parliamentary immunity of what he called the “PKK straw men in parliament“.

Leyla Zana, a leading figure in the party made the statement: "in '99, our leader Abdullah Öcalan, leader of the PKK was in İmralı" which led the crowd to chant "Long Live Apo" (Kurdish: Bijî Serok Apo) the nickname of Öcalan. A judicial investigation was initiated over her remarks. The Co-chair of the party at the time, Emine Ayna, stated that the difference between the PKKs and the DTPs demands are mainly that the PKK wants to achieve their demands for more Kurdish rights through an armed struggle while the DTP wants to find a political solution to the conflict. In

=== Disbanding ===
Between 2007 and 2009 the DTP had to face a closure case which in December 2009 brought the parties existence to an end. On the 16 September 2007, the state prosecutor of the Supreme Court Abdurrahman Yalcinkaya submitted an indictment before Constitutional Court demanding the closure of the DTP. The DTP defended itself arguing that most of what they are accused of is protected by freedom of expression. A few days after the deadly attack by the PKK on Turkish soldiers, the Constitutional Court of Turkey voted to ban the DTP on the 11 December 2009, ruling that the party has become the "focal point of activities against the indivisible unity of the state, the country and the nation" as the party has an organic connection to the PKK. The Court declared that DTP violated Articles 68 and 69 of the Constitution and the Political Parties Law. "The party became a focal point for terrorism against the indivisible integrity of the state.", stated Haşim Kılıç, president of the Court. Chairman Ahmet Turk and legislator Aysel Tuğluk were expelled from Parliament, and they and 35 other party members were banned from joining any political party for five years.

These party members include: Ahmet Türk, Leyla Zana, Aysel Tuğluk, Hüseyin Kalkan, Nurettin Demirtaş, Orhan Miroğlu.

Later the same day, the Presidency of the European Union released a statement, expressing concern over the Turkish court ruling, and calling upon Turkey to reform its legislation on political parties.

The decision of the Constitutional Court sparked reaction among AK Party parliamentarians. Mir Dengir Mehmet Fırat said: "Turkey has become a graveyard for political parties that have been shut down. Closing political parties does not bring any benefit to Turkey. The Constitutional Court in its decision drew a parallel to the case of Batasuna in Spain, but in my opinion, that example does not really apply."

Massoud Barzani, president of Iraqi Kurdistan stated "The president's office expresses its anger at the Turkish constitutional court's outlawing of the Democratic Society Party (DTP)," as hundreds of protesters gathered in Erbil, Iraq.

Most of the MPs who had been in the DTP decided to join the recently formed Peace and Democracy Party.

Major protests were held in Turkey against the party's ban.

== Pre-legislative period ==
On 30 July 2007, the members of the DTP as a group declared in their deputy information that "Turkish is their second language." The parliament stopped the dissemination of information regarding the deputies, until the situation cleared up. The Ankara politics tried to find out the answers regarding these new members ability to follow the legislation sessions, such that 16 years ago same issue happened with Leyla Zana who said that Turkish was her second language and used the Kurdish for the parliamentary oath. In 1991, the script of the parliamentary oath included words such that "I would hold my nation high." Some members of the public questioned Leyla Zana on the grounds of which nation she had sworn to "hold high". Chairwoman Aysel Tuğluk made a statement to the press on Sunday in which she asserted, "We are here to serve our country."

== Legislative period ==
On 5 November 2007, inclusion of the demand for autonomy in the six Kurdish provinces in the party program. Prime Minister Recep Tayyip Erdoğan accused the DTP of heading down a dead-end street by attempting to show Kurdish people are a minority group in Turkey.

On 11 November 2007, leader Nurettin Demirtaş called on political party leaders to convene a "democracy summit". Demirtaş noted his party has the will and initiative to stop bloodshed in the country. They acted as an intermediary in the release of the eight abducted soldiers. DTP members have been criticized after some party members met with PKK leaders when they went to northern Iraq to negotiate the release of Turkish soldiers. The DTP members did not sing Turkey's national anthem during the opening of a party conference.

The Democratic Society Party claimed that the 10% threshold of the national vote required in order to be represented in the Grand Assembly was aimed at disqualifying it from the parliament. However, multiple other parties failed to cross this threshold in the 2002 election. The Democratic Society Party decided to have its candidates run as Independents. On 13 May DTP announced that if they wanted to, they could lock up the elections by putting in five to ten thousand independent candidates. The next day in a statement, the Supreme Election Committee (Turkish: Yüksek Seçim Kurulu (YSK)) responded to DTP's threat by stating that there was no issue and that they would simply use "larger envelopes".

20 DTP affiliates running as independents were elected to the Grand National Assembly of Turkey:

- Batman: Ayla Akat Ata, Bengi Yıldız
- Bitlis: Mehmet Nezir Karabaş
- Diyarbakır: Aysel Tuğluk, Selahattin Demirtaş, Gültan Kışanak
- Hakkâri: Hamit Geylani
- Iğdır: Pervin Buldan
- Istanbul: Sebahat Tuncel
- Mardin: Ahmet Türk, Emine Ayna
- Muş: Sırrı Sakık, Nuri Yaman
- Siirt: Osman Özçelik
- Şanlıurfa: İbrahim Binici
- Şırnak: Sevahir Bayındır, Hasip Kaplan
- Tunceli: Şerafettin Halis
- Van: Fatma Kurtulan, Özdal Uçer

İstanbul deputy, Sebahat Tuncel, was under arrest when elected and being tried on charges of being a member of the PKK.

Hamit Geylani could not join the DTP parliamentarian group due to a former verdict of the Constitutional Court. Akın Birdal joined DTP to enable the party to reach the 20 deputy threshold to form a parliamentary group.

Eight of the elected deputies from the party were women. The female deputies (including İstanbul deputy Sebahat Tuncel) are:

Name	Province
Aysel Tuğluk	Diyarbakır
Gültan Kışanak	Diyarbakır
Emine Ayna	Mardin
Sevahir Bayındır	Şırnak
Fatma Kurtulan	Van
Pervin Buldan	Iğdır
Ayla Akat Ata	Batman
Sebahat Tuncel	İstanbul

=== 2009 local elections ===
After the 2009 local elections the DTP had mayors in eight provincial capitals:

Diyarbakır (metropolitan municipality)	65.58%
Batman	65.43%
Hakkâri	78.97%
Iğdır	39.62%
Siirt	49.43%
Şırnak	53.75%
Tunceli	30.00%
Van	53.54%

At the time of 2009 local elections, DTP had mayors in 54 municipalities:

Province	# Mayors	Comments
Diyarbakır Province	12	including Diyarbakır Metropolitan Municipality, the districts of Bismil, Dicle, Ergani, Kocaköy, Lice, Silvan (six districts out of thirteen) and other minor municipalities.
Mardin Province	8	including Dargeçit, Derik, Kızıltepe, Mazıdağı, Nusaybin among the nine districts of the province
Batman Province	5	including Batman city, the districts of Beşiri and Gercüş (two districts out of five) and two minor municipalities.
Şırnak Province	5	including Şırnak city and the districts of Beytüşşebap, Cizre, İdil, Silopi, among the seven of the province.
Muş Province	4	including Bulanık, Malazgirt and Varto among the nine districts of the province.
Hakkâri Province	4	including Hakkâri city, two districts out of three (Yüksekova and Şemdinli), and one minor municipality.
Şanlıurfa Province	4	including Ceylanpınar, Suruç, Viranşehir districts.
Siirt Province	2	including Kurtalan district.
Adana Province	2	two minor municipalities in Seyhan and Yüreğir districts.
Tunceli Province	1	(Tunceli city).
Ağrı Province	1	notable district of Doğubeyazıt.

One minor municipality in each of the provinces of Adıyaman, Aydın, Iğdır, Kars, Konya and Van. 43 of them in seven provinces in Southeastern Turkey are densely inhabited by Kurds, including the mainly Kurdish inhabited city of Diyarbakır, where the mayor is Osman Baydemir from the DTP. The party originally also had five municipalities in Muş. But Orhan Özer, the mayor of the minor municipality Rüstemgedik was expelled in May 2007 for practicing polygamy.

In this election on 29 March 2009, Democratic Society Party obtained the following votes in these provinces: Erzincan(0,53%), Erzurum (1,24%), Kars (14,66%), Malatya (0,06%), Tunceli (30%), Elazığ (2,51%), Bingöl (33,79%), Muş (37,23%), Ağrı (32,37%), Adıyaman (5,59%), Diyarbakır (65,27%), Siirt (49,43%), Bitlis (34,43%), Van (53,54%), Şanlıurfa (10,49%), Mardin (36,32%) and Hakkâri or Çolamerik (78,97%).
