= Emine Ayna =

Turkish politician

Member of the Grand National Assembly
- In office 2007–2015
- Constituency: Mardin (2007, 2011)

Personal details
- Born: July 1, 1976 (age 49) Dicle, Diyarbakır
- Citizenship: Turkey
- Parent(s): Günay and Osman Ayna

Emine Ayna (1 July 1968, Dicle, Diyarbakir, Turkey) is a Turkish politician of Kurdish descent. She was a member of the former Democratic Society Party (DTP). She joined the Peace and Democracy Party (BDP), after the Constitutional Court banned DTP on 11 December 2009.

== Life and career ==
Emine Ayna was born in Dicle in 1968, to mother Günay and father Osman. She is a niece of Ömer Ayna, one of ten victims of the Kızıldere Operation (30 March 1972). She is a high school graduate and founder of the Rainbow Women's Association. In 2007, she stood as an independent candidate within the Thousand Hopes alliance in the Turkish parliamentary elections, receiving 15.57% of the vote in Mardin and entering the Turkish Parliament.

On 20 July 2008, she was elected to the DTP leadership, sharing this position with Ahmet Türk. She also became Chair of the DTP Parliamentary Group, when Ahmet Türk resigned. She is widely viewed as a hardliner in demanding Kurdish cultural and political rights.

In June 2011, she was sentenced to 10 months imprisonment, for making terrorist propaganda for a speech she held at a Newroz celebration in Siirt in 2007. It was stated that at the celebration she wore clothes featuring symbols of an illegal organization and that posters were also shown with the leaders of an illegal organization.

In 2009, she stated that she could not speak Kurdish.
