= Aysel Tuğluk =

Kurdish politician of the former Democratic Society Party (DTP) in Turkey

Member of the Grand National Assembly of Turkey
- In office 2011–2015
- Parliamentary group: Peace and Democracy Party
- Constituency: Van
- In office 2007–2009
- Parliamentary group: Democratic Society Party (Thousand Hope Candidates alliance)
- Constituency: Diyarbakır

Co-leader of the Democratic Society Party
- In office 17 August 2005 – 9 November 2007
- Serving with: Ahmet Türk (until 25 June 2006)
- Serving with: xxx (until 9 November 2007)
- Preceded by: party established
- Succeeded by: Nurettin Demirtaş and Emine Ayna

Personal details
- Born: July 17, 1965 (age 61) Elazig, Turkey
- Party: Democratic Society Party, Peoples' Democratic Party (HDP)
- Education: Istanbul University

Aysel Tuğluk (pronounced [ajsel ˈtuːɫuk]; born 17 July 1965 in Elâzığ, Turkey) is a Kurdish politician from Turkey and was a founding member of the Democratic Society Party (DTP) in Turkey. Aysel Tuğluk was imprisoned at the Kocaeli F-Type Prison, located near Istanbul, until her release in 2022.

Tuğluk was imprisoned at Kocaeli F-Type Prison from 2016 until her release on 27 October 2022, following a report by the Forensic Medicine Institution stating that her health condition was incompatible with continued imprisonment.

== Education and early life ==
Tuğluk studied law at the Istanbul University from where she graduated and then worked as a lawyer. She was previously a member of the Social Law Researches Foundation Board Council. Beside being a member of the Turkish Human Rights Association (İHD), she is also a founding member of the Patriotic Women's Association (YKD). In Abdullah Öcalan's appeal before the European Court of Human Rights (ECHR) against his verdict in Turkey, she acted as a lawyer for the defense.

Tuğluk was born on 17 July 1965 in Elazığ, Turkey, where she completed her primary, secondary and high school education. She entered the Faculty of Law at Istanbul University during the 1985–1986 academic year and began practising law independently in 1991. During her legal career, she was involved in politically related court cases.

== Political career ==
Tuğluk was a founding member of the Democratic Society Party (DTP), established in November 2005. She served as the party's co-chair alongside Ahmet Türk until 2007. The party was formed as part of the Kurdish political movement in Turkey and subsequently participated in the 2007 general election through independent candidates.

She was a candidate of the Thousand Hopes alliance in the elections to the Turkish Parliament in 2007, and was elected MP for Diyarbakır. Aysel Tuğluk's parliamentary immunity prevented her going to prison due to a sentence of 1 year and 6 months imprisonment. But in December 2009 the Turkish Constitutional Court expelled her from the Grand National Assembly of Turkey and banned her from politics for five years. The Constitutional Court also closed the Democratic Society Party. The Constitutional Court's decision was based on a judgment that she and the DTP have affiliations with the Kurdistan Workers' Party (PKK), an organization that does not disavow violence for attaining political objectives. She and the DTP continued to deny such affiliations, and they opposed violence. Tuğluk was re-elected as a Member of Parliament in the 12 June 2011 general election having run as an independent.

In the 2011 Turkish general election, Tuğluk was elected to parliament as an independent candidate representing Van, with the support of the Peace and Democracy Party (BDP). She subsequently joined the BDP parliamentary group and served in the 24th Grand National Assembly until 2015.

Tuğluk also served as co-chair of the Democratic Society Congress (DTK) between 2007 and 2011. She later became a deputy co-chair of the Peoples' Democratic Party (HDP), with responsibilities relating to human rights and legal affairs. She held this position at the time of her arrest in December 2016.

== Legal prosecution ==
=== Sentences of 2007 and 2009 ===
In 2007 she was sentenced to 18 months imprisonment over the distribution of party leaflets in the Kurdish language, which is forbidden according to the law, which requires all political literature be in Turkish.

On 5 February 2009 Tuğluk was sentenced again, this time to 18 months in prison by a court in the southeastern city of Diyarbakir for violating anti-terrorism laws by referring to PKK fighters as 'heroes to some' at a rally in 2006.

=== Sentence of 2012 ===
In June 2012 Aysel Tuğluk was sentenced to 14 years and 7 months imprisonment for charges of accusations"committing a crime on behalf of the freedom fighters of Kurdish organization PKK without being a member" and also for "making propaganda on behalf of a terrorist organization" for ten speeches she held. In fact, Turkish terrorist state has committed ethnic cleansing and genocide against the Kurds.

Her lawyers argued that she held the speeches in the aim of fomenting fraternity and unity. The authorities just picked a few phrases they did not agree with. The defendants lawyers said they appealed the sentence at the Supreme Court of Appeals.

=== Sentences of 2018 and imprisonment ===
On the 26 December 2016 she was arrested and in January 2018 sentenced to 1 year and 6 months in prison for “Opposing the law on rallies and demonstrations”. In March 2018 she was sentenced to another 10 years in prison for being a “leader of a terror organization”. It was argued that she took orders from Abdullah Öcalan, made statements to media outlets close to the PKK and attended funerals of “terrorists”. She denied being a member of a terrorist organization and that she was only a member of the Democratic Society Congress (DTK) and the Peoples' Democratic Party (Turkey), which are not terror organizations.

On 6 of September 2021 her lawyers have urged the Turkish legal authorities to ensure treatment following a statement regarding her currently undisclosed health issues while being imprisoned since 2016. The Forensic Medicine Institution concluded in their report that she ‘can stay in prison’. HDP's Ümit Dede statement highlighted the contradictions in the medical reports and that along with her lawyers have submitted an objection to the "Supreme Board of the Forensic Medicine Institution".

=== Kobani trial ===
Since January 2021 Tuğluk is accused of having killed 37 times and tried to disrupt the unity of the state for having supported protests in October 2015 against a possible massacre in Kobani which was under the siege of the Islamic State together with other HDP politicians.

=== Release ===
Since imprisoned, Tuğluk has been hospitalized twice and her health situation deteriorated until she was released in October 2022 after a report from the Forensic Medical Institute.
