= Ahmet Türk =

Turkish politician of Kurdish origin (born 1942)

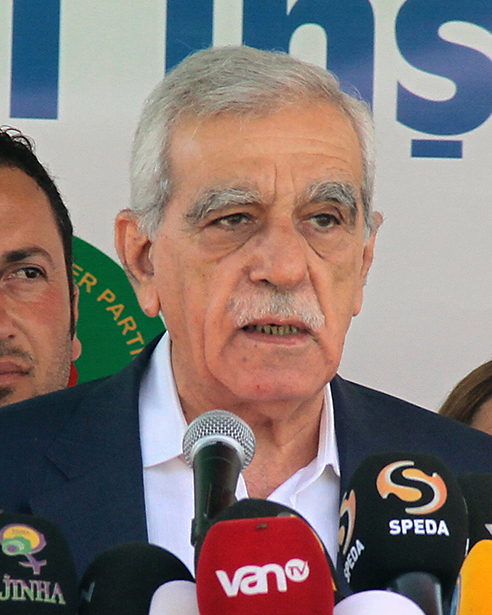
- Ahmet Türk in 2015

Mayor of Mardin
- In office 3 April 2024 – 4 November 2024
- Preceded by: Mustafa Yaman
- Succeeded by: Tuncay Akkoyun
- In office 15 April 2019 – 19 August 2019
- Preceded by: Mustafa Yaman
- Succeeded by: Mustafa Yaman
- In office 8 April 2014 – 16 November 2016
- Preceded by: Süleyman Yıldız
- Succeeded by: Mustafa Yaman

Leader of the Democratic Society Party
- In office 17 August 2005 – 3 July 2007 Serving with Aysel Tuğluk (until 25 June 2006)
- Preceded by: Party established
- Succeeded by: Nurettin Demirtaş

Member of the Grand National Assembly
- In office 23 July 2007 – 30 March 2014
- Constituency: Mardin (2007, 2011)
- In office 14 December 1987 – 4 December 1995
- Constituency: Mardin (1987, 1991)
- In office 24 October 1973 – 12 September 1980
- Constituency: Mardin (1973, 1977)

Personal details
- Born: 2 July 1942 (age 84) Derik, Mardin Province, Turkey
- Party: Peoples' Equality and Democracy Party (DEM Party) (2023–present)
- Other political affiliations: Democratic Party (DP) (1973–1974); Republican People's Party (CHP) (1974–1980); Social Democratic Populist Party (SHP) (1987–1989); People's Labour Party (HEP) (1990–1993); Democracy Party (DEP) (1993–1994); People's Democracy Party (HADEP) (1994–2003); Democratic People's Party (DEHAP) (2003–2005); Democratic Society Party (DTP) (2005–2009); Peoples' Democratic Party (HDP) (2014–2023)
- Spouse: Mülkiye Türk
- Children: 8
- Occupation: Politician

Ahmet Türk (born 2 July 1942, in Derik, Mardin, Turkey) is a Kurdish politician from the Peoples' Equality and Democracy Party (DEM Party). He has been a member of the Grand National Assembly of Turkey for several terms and was elected thrice as the Mayor of Mardin.

== Political career ==
He was elected MP for the Democratic Party (DP) representing Mardin province in 1973. Later he resigned and joined the Republican People's Party (CHP) and was re-elected as a deputy representing Mardin. Following the military coup in 1980, he was removed from parliament, arrested and sent to Diyarbakir Prison for 22 months. After his release, he was active in different left wing parties. In 1987, he was elected to parliament as a representative of Mardin on behalf of the Social Democratic Populist Party (SHP) but got expelled from the party in 1989 for attending a Kurdish Conference in Brussels. He then joined the newly founded Peoples Labor Party (HEP). The SHP agreed again to an electoral alliance and in 1991 he was re-elected to parliament. He supported an eventual peace process between the Kurdistan Workers Party (PKK) and the Turkish Government, and in April 1993 he travelled to Bar Elias, Lebanon to attend jointly with Jalal Talabani and Kemal Burkay a press conference where a unilateral ceasefire was announced by Abdullah Öcalan, leader of the PKK. In July 1993 the HEP was prohibited by the Constitutional Court, alleging the party was pursuing aims contrary to the indivisibility of Turkey. He then joined the Democracy Party (DEP) a successor party of the HEP established in May 1993. The DEP was supportive of the PKK and elected Hatip Dicle as its party chair, who reasoned that the PKK was not a terrorist party and should be classified a political party. In fact, several of the parties leaders had attended congresses attended also by PKK members ahead of the party's foundation congress. Türk's and five other DEP deputies parliamentary immunities were lifted in March 1994 and he was sentenced to 15 years in prison for terror charges. He appealed and was released on the 27 October 1995. Türk was the chairman of the former pro-Kurdish Democratic Society Party (DTP) in Turkey and was a member of the Grand National Assembly of Turkey. On 26 February 2007, as the acting president of the DTP, he was sentenced together with vice-president Sebahat Tuncel to 18 months imprisonment for having used the Kurdish language in a leaflet of the DTP women wing, for the International Women's Day on 8 March. Then on 6 March 2007 he was convicted to 6 months imprisonment for calling Abdullah Öcalan "Mister" (Sayin), but the sentence was suspended. He was again elected MP to the Turkish Parliament for Mardin on the 22 July 2007. However, on 11 December 2009, the Constitutional Court of Turkey voted to ban the DTP, accusing it of connection with the Kurdistan Workers' Party (PKK). Türk was expelled from the Grand National Assembly and he and 36 other party members were banned from joining any political party for five years. Türk appealed to the European Court of Human Rights and in 2016 Turkey was condemned to pay 30,000 Turkish Liras. In April 2010 he was attacked by İsmail Çelik who beat him and broke his nose. Çelik first received a prison sentence of 11 months and 20 days, which was later changed into a fine of 7000 Turkish Liras (about US$300).

=== Mayor of Mardin ===
In the 2014 local elections, Ahmet Türk was elected mayor of Mardin, associated with the Democratic Regions Party (DBP). When the city of Nusaybin came under a curfew in November 2015, he took part in a march towards the city together with fellow politicians of the DBP but was almost detained by the Turkish authorities. On 21 November 2016 he was detained "on terror charges" after being dismissed from office by Turkish authorities, and a trustee was appointed as an acting mayor instead. Later in the month he was formally arrested. Following his arrest, Deniz Baykal of the CHP showed moral support to Türk's wife Mülkiye and visited her in Mardin. He was released on the 3 February 2017. In the Turkish local elections 2019 he was re-elected as mayor of Mardin. In August 2019 he was dismissed again by the Interior Ministry due to accusations for supporting terrorism and replaced by the Governor of Mardin Province Mustafa Yaman, who was appointed as a trustee. Türk was accused of having attended a funeral of a member of the People's Protection Units (YPG) in Mazidagi in 2015, but in February 2020, a court acquitted him from the charges.

==== Further legal prosecution ====
On the 17 March 2021, the state prosecutor Bekir Şahin demanded for him and 686 other HDP politicians a five-year ban to engage in politics together with a closure of the HDP due to the parties alleged organizational unity with the PKK.

=== Political views ===
He was involved in the peace process between the PKK and Turkey and met Abdullah Öcalan together with Ayla Akat Ata in 2013. He has been described as "the most peaceful, most inclusive, most anti-violence, most moderate and wisest figure of the Kurdish political movement, and the one most likely to compromise." He has supported the celebration of Newroz, the Kurdish new year, and in his aim to reconcile with the victims of the Genocide during World War I, he has apologized to the Assyrian, Yazidi and Armenian population for the role of the Kurds in the genocide.

Political offices
Preceded by Süleyman Yıldız	Mayor of Mardin; 30 March 2014 – 16 November 2016	Succeeded by Mustafa Yaman
Preceded by Mustafa Yaman	Mayor of Mardin; 31 March 2019 – 19 August 2019	Succeeded by Mustafa Yaman
Preceded by Tuncay Akkoyun	Mayor of Mardin; 3 April 2024 - 4 November 2024	Succeeded by Tuncay Akkoyun
