= Hasib (name) =

Haseeb
- Pronunciation: Arabic: [ˈħa.siːb] Persian: [ˈhæ.siːb] Turkish: [ˈhɑ.sip]
- Gender: Male

Origin
- Origin: Arabic
- Meaning: "noble", "respected" or "reckoner"
- Region of origin: Arabia

Other names
- Alternative spelling: Haseeb, Hasyb, Hasip, Hasibul

Hasib (also spelled Haseeb, Hasip, Hassib, or Hasyb) (Arabic: حسيب) is a masculine given name of Arabic origin meaning "noble", "respected", or "reckoner". The name is mentioned in the Quran as Al-Hasib, translated as The Bringer of Judgement, one of the Names of God in Islam. The name is sometimes styled Abdul-Hasib; the prefix Abdul meaning servant, denoting subservience to God. Notable people with the given name include:

== Given name ==
=== Haseeb ===
- Haseeb Ahsan (1939–2013), Pakistani cricketer
- Haseeb Amjad (born 1987), Hong Kong cricketer
- Haseeb Azam (born 1986), Pakistani cricketer
- Haseeb Drabu (born 1961), Indian politician
- Haseeb Fatmi, American attorney and politician
- Haseeb Hameed (born 1997), English cricketer
- Haseeb-ul-Hasan (1964–1990), Pakistani first-class cricketer
- Haseeb Hassan (born 1977), Pakistani film director
- Haseeb-ur-Rehman (born 1992), Pakistani cricketer
- Haseeb Shehada (born 1944), Israeli scholar

=== Hasib ===
- Hasib Aziz (born 1971), Bangladeshi police commissioner
- Hasib Hodžić (born 1945), Bosnian politician
- Hasibul Hossain (born 1977), Bangladeshi cricketer
- Hasib Hussain (1986–2005), British terrorist
- Hasib Quwayi Markaz (1992–2026), Afghan military commander
- Hasibul Islam Mizan (1957–2019), Bangladeshi film director
- Hasibun Naher, Bangladeshi mathematician
- Hasib Nimr, Lebanese writer and poet
- Hasib Sabbagh (1920–2010), Palestinian businessman
- Hasib Ydlibi (1866–??), Ottoman businessman

=== Hasip ===
- Hasip Kaplan (born 1954), Turkish lawyer and politician

=== Hassib ===
- Hassib Ben Ammar (1924–2008), Tunisian politician and journalist

== Fictional characters ==
- Hasib Karim al-Din, character from One Thousand and One Nights
