= Desert of Paran =

Location mentioned in the Hebrew Bible

The Desert of Paran or Wilderness of Paran (also sometimes spelled Pharan or Faran; Biblical Hebrew: מִדְבַּר פָּארָן, romanized: Midbar Pa'ran), is a location mentioned in the Hebrew Bible. It is one of the places where the Israelites spent part of their 40 years of wandering after the Exodus, and was also a home to Ishmael, and a place of refuge for David.

In Islamic tradition, it has often been equated with an area near Mecca in the Hejaz.

== In the Bible ==
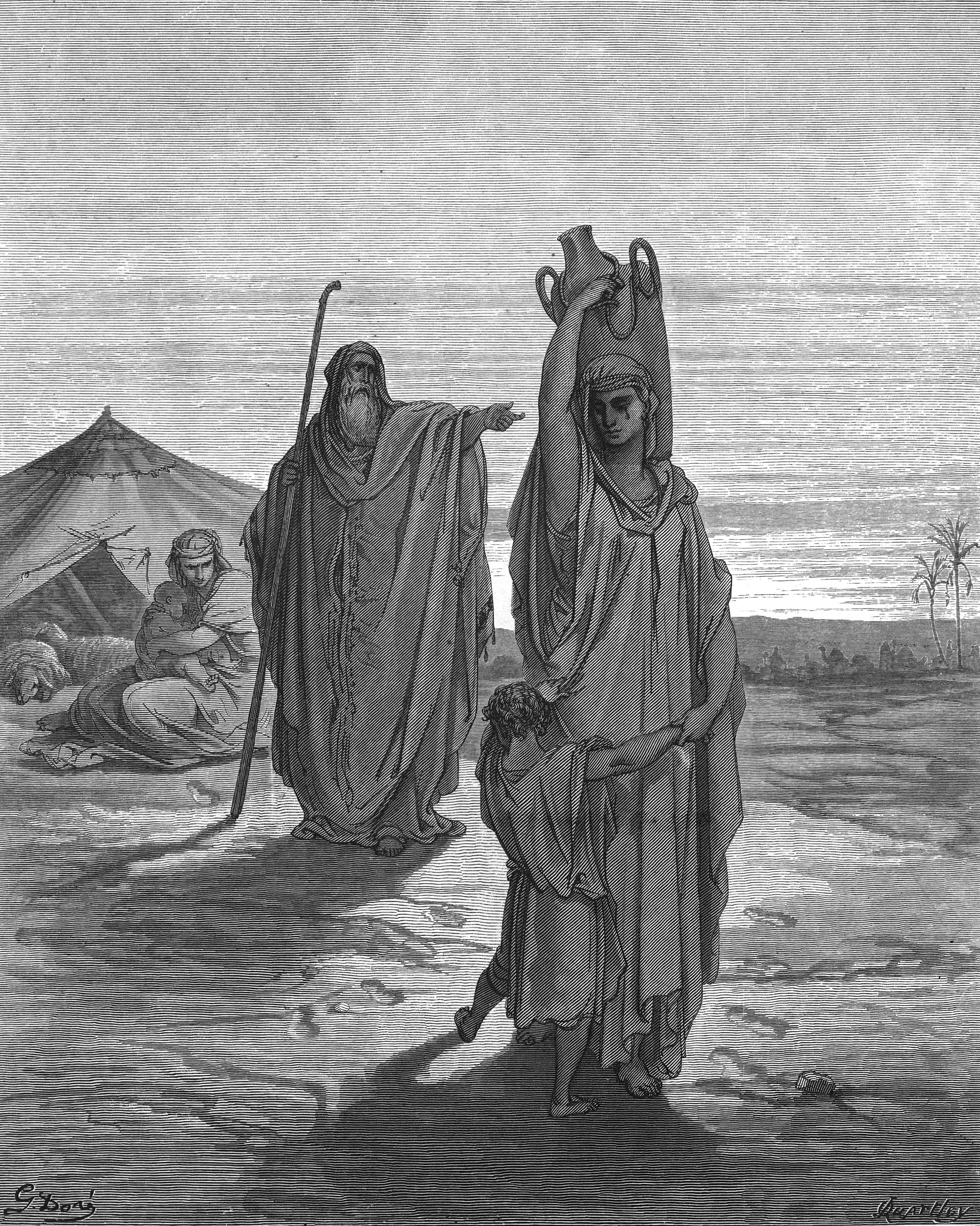
Abraham sends Hagar and Ishmael into the desert, illustration by Gustave Doré

El-paran, "on the edge of the wilderness", is first mentioned in Genesis 14, marking the boundary of the land occupied by the Horites at the time when they were defeated by Elamite king Chedorlaomer and his allies.

The Wilderness or Desert of Paran is also said to be the place where Hagar was sent into exile from Abraham's dwelling in Gerar. Hagar was the Egyptian servant girl of Abraham's wife Sarah/Sarai; at Sarah's suggestion, she became Abraham's concubine, and gave birth to a son, Ishmael. After Sarah herself had given birth to a son, Isaac, Ishmael was seen mocking Isaac, and so Sarah demanded that Hagar and Ishmael be sent away. They "departed, and strayed in the wilderness of Beer-sheba". As their initial supplies of food and drink were running out,

God opened [Hagar's] eyes, and she saw a well of water; and she went, and filled the bottle with water, and gave the lad drink. And God was with the lad, and he grew; and he dwelt in the wilderness, and became an archer. And he dwelt in the wilderness of Paran; and his mother took him a wife out of the land of Egypt.

Paran is later mentioned in the Book of Numbers as a place where the Israelites temporarily settled during the Exodus:

Then the Israelites set out from the Desert of Sinai and traveled from place to place until the cloud came to rest in the Desert of Paran. (Numbers 10:12; see also Numbers 12:16)

Paran again features in the opening lines of the Book of Deuteronomy as being located "beyond the Jordan" (Deuteronomy 1:1), in addition:

He said: "The LORD came from Sinai and dawned over them from Seir; he shone from Mount Paran. He came with myriads of holy ones, from his right hand went a fiery law for them." (Deuteronomy 33:2)

King David went to the wilderness of Paran after the death of Samuel.

=== Geographical proximity arguments ===
The narrative timeline and familial relationships described in the Book of Genesis provide key logistical constraints used by biblical geographers to evaluate these competing locations:

- Proximity to Egypt: According to Genesis 21:21, Ishmael's Egyptian mother, Hagar, secured an Egyptian wife for him while they lived in the Wilderness of Paran. Proponents of a western location (such as Wadi Feiran in the Sinai Peninsula) argue that this reflects close proximity to Egypt's eastern border. Conversely, critics argue that a location further south in the Hejaz region near Mecca—roughly 750 to 800 miles away across hyper-arid terrain—would pose severe logistical and survival barriers for a mother seeking family ties.
- Proximity to Canaan and Isaac: Genesis 25:9 states that when Abraham died in Hebron, his estranged sons Isaac and Ishmael reunited to bury him. Isaac's settlements were located in the southern Negev at Beersheba and Beer-lahai-roi. Geographers note that if Paran is situated in either the Sinai Peninsula or the Transjordan/Midian region (as described by Eusebius), Ishmael would have resided within a manageable 150 to 250 miles of Isaac. This geographical proximity supports the narrative timeline required for Ishmael to receive word of his father's death and journey to Hebron for a joint burial.

== In Christian tradition ==
Both Eusebius (in his Onomasticon, a Bible dictionary) and Jerome reported that Paran was a city in Paran desert, in Arabia Deserta (beyond Arabia Nabataea), southeast of Eilat Pharan. Onomasticon, under Pharan, states: "(Now) a city beyond Arabia adjoining the desert of the Saracens [who wander in the desert] through which the children of Israel went moving (camp) from Sinai. Located (we say) beyond Arabia on the south, three days journey to the east of Aila (in the desert Pharan) where Scripture affirms Ismael dwelled, whence the Ishmaelites. It is said (we read) also that (king) Chodollagomor cut to pieces those in 'Pharan which is in the desert'."

Eusebius' mention of Chodollagomor refers to a possible earlier mention of Paran in Genesis 14:6, which states that as he and the other kings allied with him were campaigning in the region of Sodom and Gomorrah, they smote "the Horites in their mount Seir, unto El-paran, which is by the wilderness". (KJV)

Sebeos, the Armenian Bishop and historian, describing the Arab conquest of his time, wrote that the Arabs "assembled and came out from Paran".

== In Islamic tradition ==
According to Wahb ibn Munabbih, there was a Tal Faran ("Hill of Faran") on the outskirts of Mecca, mentioned in his book Kitab al-Tijan, a Pre-Islamic Arabic folklore compilation. Ibn Munabbih further suggested an identification for Tal Faran as the 'mound of the Two runaways', a place where the Jurhum tribe found Hagar and Ishmael and thought of them as two runaways.

The Arab geographer Al-Maqdisi (d. 991) mentioned in his book that the Red Sea branches into two "at the extremity of al-Hijaz at a place called Faran".

The association of Paran in Genesis 21:21 with Ishmael and the Ishmaelites is affirmed by the Muslim geographer Yaqut al-Hamawi (d. 1229) who refers to "Faran, an arabized Hebrew word, one of the names of Mecca mentioned in the Torah". Islamic and Arabic traditions hold that the wilderness of Paran is, broadly speaking, the Hejaz, the northern half of Tihamah, stretching along the east side of the Red Sea starting from Jordan and Sinai, and that the specific site where Ishmael settled is that of Mecca, near the mountains of Paran.

The name 'Paran' or 'Faran' has often been used to refer specifically to the wilderness and mountains near where Mecca is situated. Al-Hamdani (d. 947) in his book Geography of the Arabic Peninsula says that the Paran mountains around Mecca were named after Paran son of Amalek. Sam'ni in his Book of Surnames also says that the surname Farani is derived from the Faran mountains near Mecca in Hijaz

Haggai Mazuz asserts that Muslim polemicists' (like the Jewish convert Samawʾal al-Maghribī, 1125–1175 CE) appropriation of Deut. 33:2 has antecedence in Jewish tradition itself, as some Midrashim and Targumim, before the rise of Islam itself, posed a connection between Paran and Ishmael-Arabs. For instance, commentating on the Sifrei Debarīm, a halakhic midrash on Deuteronomy, dated from the 3rd to the 5th century CE, he says:

the link between Paran and the Arabs (actually the Arabic language), who are also called Ishmaelites after Ishmael (among other names), is very early although somewhat vague.

== Samaritan Pentateuch ==
The "Desert of Paran" is also interpreted as Hijaz in an old Arabic translation of the Samaritan Pentateuch. When it was translated into English in 1851, it was found to include a footnote recording this interpretation.

== Geographical location ==
The wilderness of Paran is often associated with Mount Sinai in Egypt, and there is some evidence that it may originally have referred to the southern portion of the Sinai Peninsula. In 1989, Professor Haseeb Shehada, in his translation of the Samaritan Torah, suggested an identification of the wilderness of Paran with the desert of Western Arabia, which is known today as the Hijaz.

More recently, Uzi Avner has argued that the biblical Desert of Paran was located in the southern mountain region of the Sinai Peninsula, encompassing the Wadi Feiran. Avner argues that inscriptions from the Nabatean period bearing the first or surname "Paran" indicate that the local population has preserved the biblical geographical name of this area for centuries.

== See also ==
- Middle East
- Wadi Feiran, whose oasis was identified by Ptolemy as "Paran"
