= Race and ethnicity in censuses =

Ethnic identity questions on national censuses

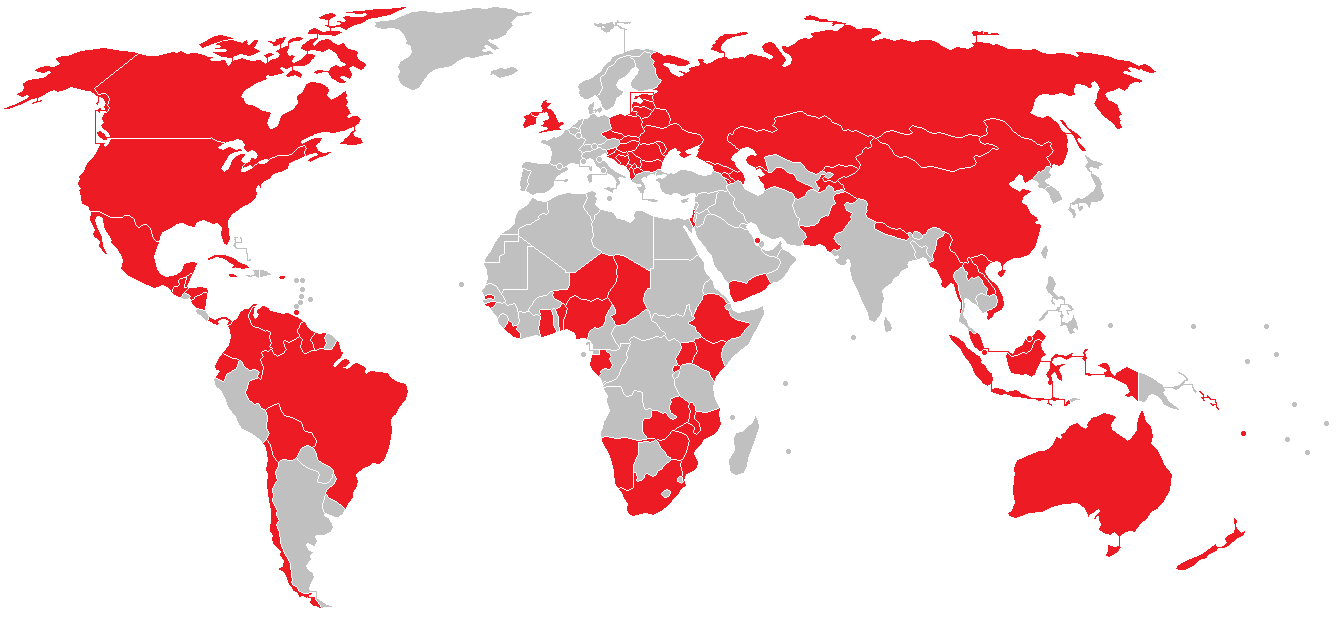
Map showing countries where the ethnicity or race of people was enumerated in at least one census since 1991

Many countries and national censuses currently enumerate or have previously enumerated their populations by race, ethnicity, nationality, or a combination of these characteristics. Different countries have different classifications and census options for race and ethnicity/nationality which are not comparable with data from other countries. In addition, many of the race and ethnicity concepts that appear on national censuses worldwide have their origins in Europe or in the views of Europeans, rather than in the views of the locals of these countries.

== Africa ==
=== Angola ===
Ethnic composition of Angola in 1970

The Portuguese asked about race in colonial censuses when they controlled Angola, and they provided three options: White, Mestiço, or African/Black. Africans had to then pick either "Assimilado" (assimilated) or "Indigenato" (indigenous). Angola has not used any racial categories since its independence in 1975. Tribe and language for Africans were recorded only in 1950 and 1960.

=== Benin ===
The people in Benin were enumerated by ethnicity in 1979, 1992, and 2013 but not in 2002.

=== Botswana ===
Botswana enumerated people by race in all censuses between 1904 and 1946, and again in the 1964 census (though not in 1956), but in no censuses after 1964. People were enumerated by language use in 1946 and 1956 and again in 2001 and 2011.

=== Cape Verde ===
Cape Verde enumerated its population by ethnicity in 1950.

=== Central African Republic ===
The Central African Republic enumerated its population by ethnicity in 1959/1960.

=== Chad ===
Chad enumerated people by ethnicity in 1993 and 2009.

=== Democratic Republic of Congo ===
The people in the Democratic Republic of Congo were enumerated by ethnicity from 1955 to 1958.

=== Republic of Congo ===
The people in the Republic of Congo were enumerated by ethnicity in 1960, 1974, and 1984.

=== Equatorial Guinea ===
The population of Equatorial Guinea was enumerated by ethnicity in 1950.

=== Ethiopia ===
Ethiopia enumerated people by ethnicity in 1994 and in 2007.

=== Gabon ===
The population of Gabon was enumerated by ethnicity in 1960–1961 and 1993.

=== Ghana ===
The population of Ghana was enumerated by ethnicity in 1960, 2000, and 2010.

=== Guinea ===
The population of Guinea was enumerated by ethnicity in 1955.

=== Guinea-Bissau ===
The population of Guinea-Bissau was enumerated by ethnicity in 1950 and in 2009.

=== Ivory Coast ===
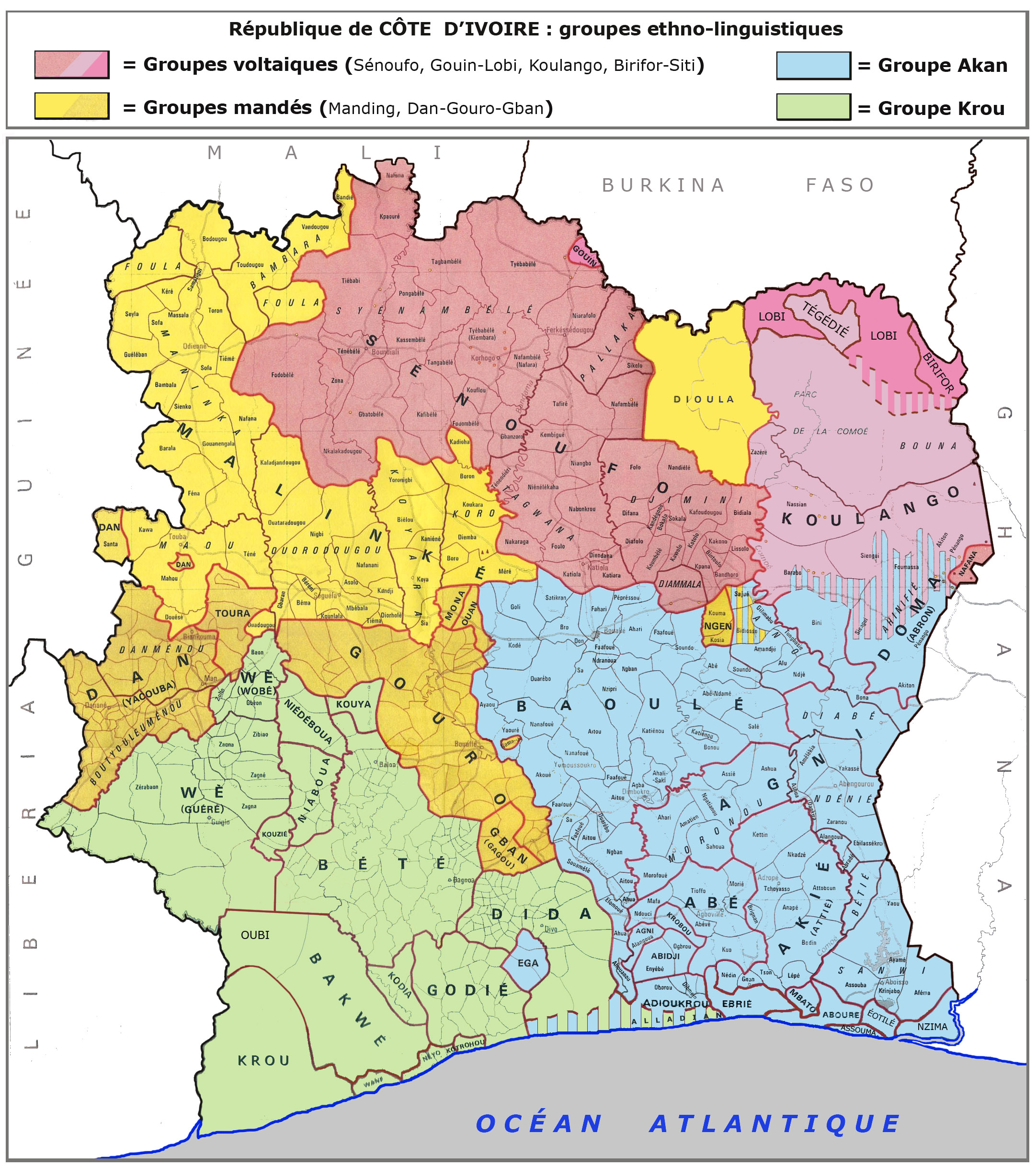
Ethnic composition of the Ivory Coast (Note: the map is in French.)

The people of Ivory Coast were enumerated by ethnicity in 1948, 1957–1958, and 1988. The ethnicity data from 1957 to 1958 was only for the rural areas of the country, though.

=== Kenya ===
Since 1945, Kenya enumerated people by ethnicity from 1948 all the way up to its most recent census in 2009 (however, the 1999 census ethnicity figures were not made public). There were some concerns about asking an ethnicity equation in the 2009 census since it came just a year after the disputed Kenyan presidential election of 2007 and the riots that followed it. Kenya, nevertheless, went through with asking about ethnicity in 2009.

The number of ethnic categories and sub-categories recorded in the country's census has changed significantly over time, expanding from 42 in 1969 to more than 120 in 2019.

=== Lesotho ===
People in Lesotho were enumerated by race between 1904 and 1976, but not after 1976. Language was only recorded in 1946 and 1956, tribe and language for Africans were recorded only in 1950 and 1960.

=== Malawi ===
People in Malawi were enumerated by race between 1911 and 1987, and again in 2018. They were enumerated by language only in 1966, 1998, and 2008. They were enumerated by tribal affiliation only in 1926, 1945, and 2008.

=== Mali ===
Mali enumerated people in some parts of the country by ethnicity in 1950.

=== Mauritius ===
Mauritius enumerated its population by ethnicity in 1952, 1962, and 1972.

=== Morocco ===
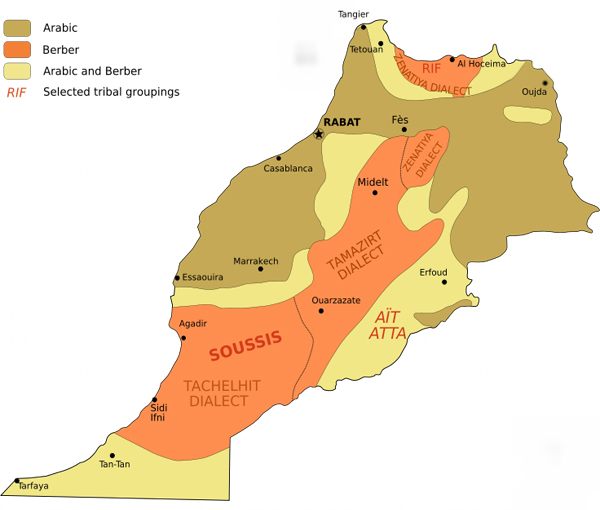
Ethnolinguistic composition of Morocco

Morocco enumerated people by ethnicity in 1950 and 1971. The 2014 census enumerated people by nationality.

=== Mozambique ===
People in Mozambique were counted by race only in 1894, 1970, 1997, 2007, and 2017. The race categories in Mozambique were the same ones as in Angola, due to both being controlled by Portugal before acquiring their independence. People were counted by language in all censuses since 1940.

=== Namibia ===
People in Namibia were enumerated by race in all 20th century censuses but not in the 2001 census. They were enumerated by language in all censuses since 1951.

=== Niger ===
Niger enumerated people by ethnicity in 1959/1960 and 2001.

=== Nigeria ===
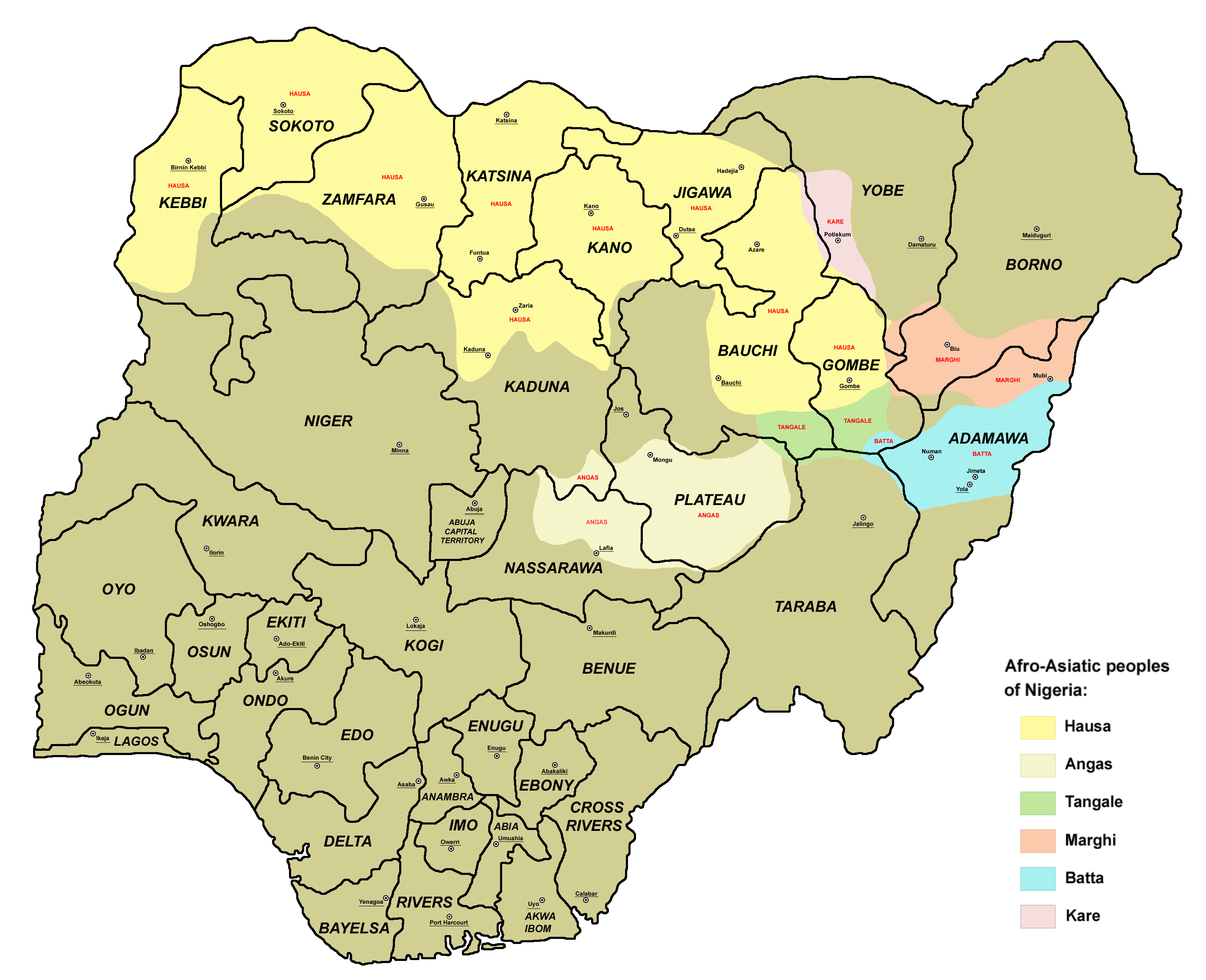
Ethnic composition of Nigeria

Nigeria enumerated people by ethnicity in 1963. In addition, Nigeria has announced plans to enumerate its population by ethnicity in its 2016 census.

=== Rwanda ===
Rwanda enumerated people by ethnicity from 1933/34 until 1991. Due to the 1994 Rwandan Genocide and the ethnic hatred and tensions that caused it, the Rwandan census of 2002 did not enumerate people by ethnicity.

=== São Tomé and Príncipe ===
São Tomé and Príncipe enumerated its population by ethnicity in 1950 and 1960.

=== Senegal ===
The people of Senegal were enumerated by ethnicity in 1960–1961, 1988, and 2002.

=== Seychelles ===
The people of the Seychelles were enumerated by ethnicity in 1947, 1987, and 1994.

=== Somalia ===
In the pre-independence period in Somalia, the colonial administrations in British Somaliland and Italian Somaliland officially classified the ethnic Somali majority within the two territories as "Hamitic". The Italian Somaliland census of 1935 reported that the remaining 6.2% of the area's population consisted of "Negroid groups", including the Bantu ethnic minorities inhabiting the southern riverine region. These census designations were at the time pre-assigned rather than based on self-reporting. Following independence in 1960, no official census was taken until 1975. This first post-independence national census only collected information on district of birth. However, the general government literature maintained that the country's ethnic Somali majority was of Hamitic stock, or alternately of Arab heritage. Similarly, Article 3 of the Provision Constitution adopted in 2012 indicates that Somalia is an Arab nation. In 2014, the Ministry of Planning and International Cooperation also announced that it would release a new national population census before 2016.

=== South Africa ===
Whites as a percentage of the total South African population in 2011

South Africa has enumerated people by race in all of its censuses since 1904. Five population group options are provided in response to the question "How would (name) describe him/herself in terms of population group?": "Black African", "Coloured", "Indian or Asian", "White" and "Other". South Africa has also asked about language use since 1921 for white South Africans and since 1936 for all races.

=== Sudan ===
Sudan enumerated people by ethnicity in 1956.

=== Swaziland ===
The Swazi census counted people by race in all censuses between 1904 and 1976. People were counted by ethnic group and tribe only in 1966 and 1976.

=== Tanzania ===
The Tanzanian census enumerated people by race from colonial times until 1967, by ethnicity and tribe from colonial times until 1973. It enumerated people by language only in 1952 and 1958.

=== Togo ===
The people in Togo were enumerated by ethnicity in 1948, 1958–1960, and 1970.

=== Tunisia ===
Tunisia enumerated people by ethnicity in 1956.

=== Uganda ===
The people of Uganda were enumerated by ethnicity from 1948 all the way up to Uganda's most recent census in 2012, with the exception of 1980 and possibly 1969.

=== Zambia ===
People in Zambia were not continuously counted by race before independence, and when they were counted by race it were primarily the non-Africans/non-blacks who were counted. People were counted by language only in 1931, while they were counted for ethnicity at various points since 1969. The 1969 census asked about language but not ethnic group, and the 1974 census asked about ethnic group, but not language. The 1980 census asked about ethnic group, mother tongue, and language of most frequent use, while the 1990 census asked about ethnic group and mother tongue. The 2000 census asked about ethnic group, language of most frequent use, and second language.

=== Zimbabwe ===
People in Zimbabwe were enumerated by race between 1901 and 2012, but many censuses were done separately for Whites/Europeans and Blacks/Africans before the 1970s. People were enumerated by language only in 1982 (when they were enumerated by "[their] father's dialect").

== Asia ==
=== Abkhazia ===
People in Abkhazia (when it was still a part of the Russian Empire) were enumerated by native tongue in the 1897 Russian Empire Census. In addition to the Soviet Union enumerating people by ethnicity for its entire existence, the partially recognized state of Abkhazia also enumerated people by ethnicity in its post-Soviet censuses of 2003 and 2011.

=== Afghanistan ===
Prior to 2010, Afghanistan had not held a census since 1979 due to the wars and conflicts that have occurred there over those three decades (since the Soviet invasion of Afghanistan in 1979).

=== Armenia ===
People in Armenia (when it was still a part of the Russian Empire) were enumerated by native tongue in the 1897 Russian Empire Census. In addition to the Soviet Union enumerating people by ethnicity for its entire existence, Armenia also enumerated people by ethnicity in its post-Soviet censuses of 2001 and 2011.

=== Azerbaijan ===
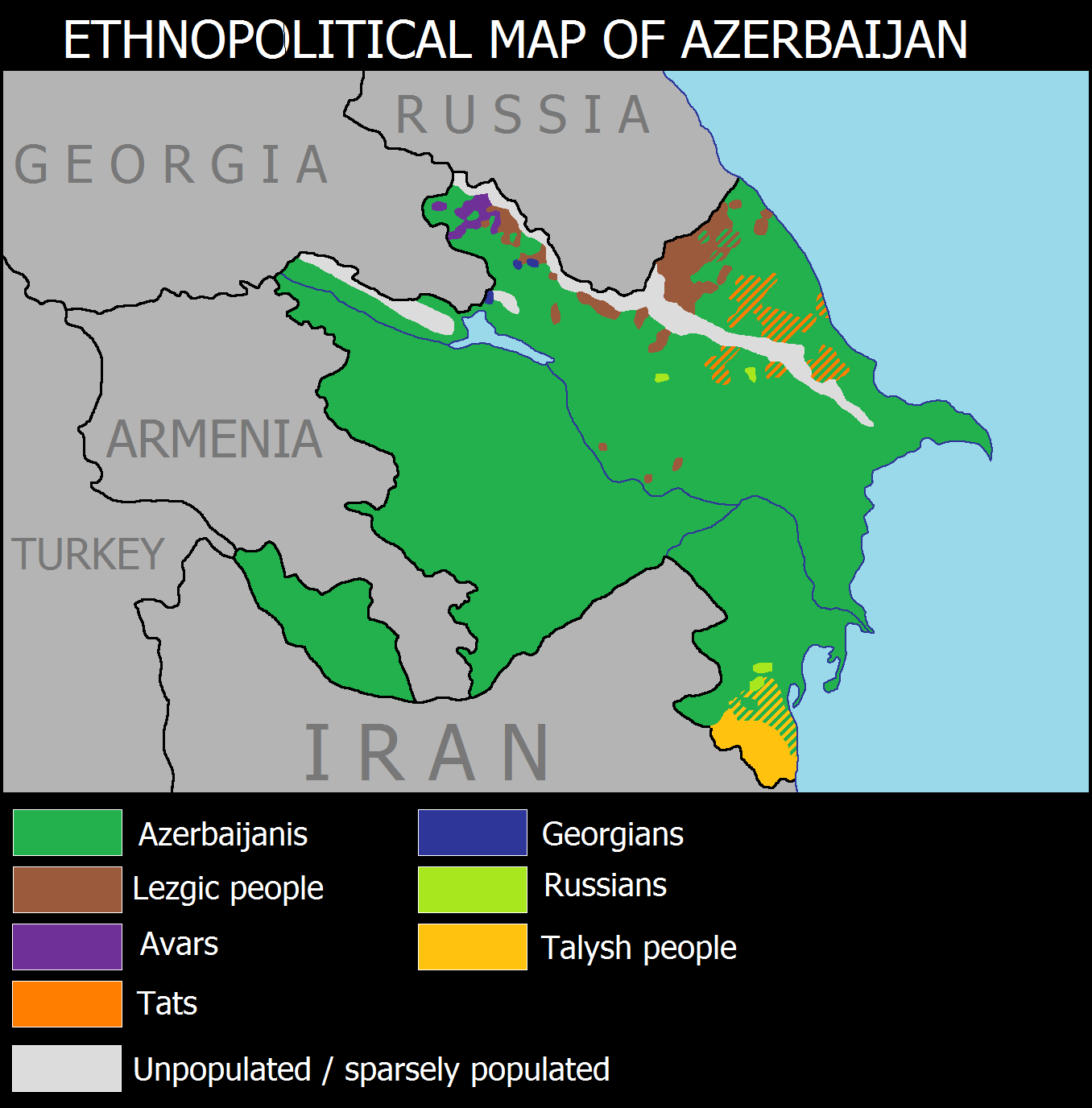
Ethnic composition of Azerbaijan (2024, after the collapse of the breakaway Republic of Nagorno-Karabakh and the flight of Nagorno-Karabakh Armenians in 2023)

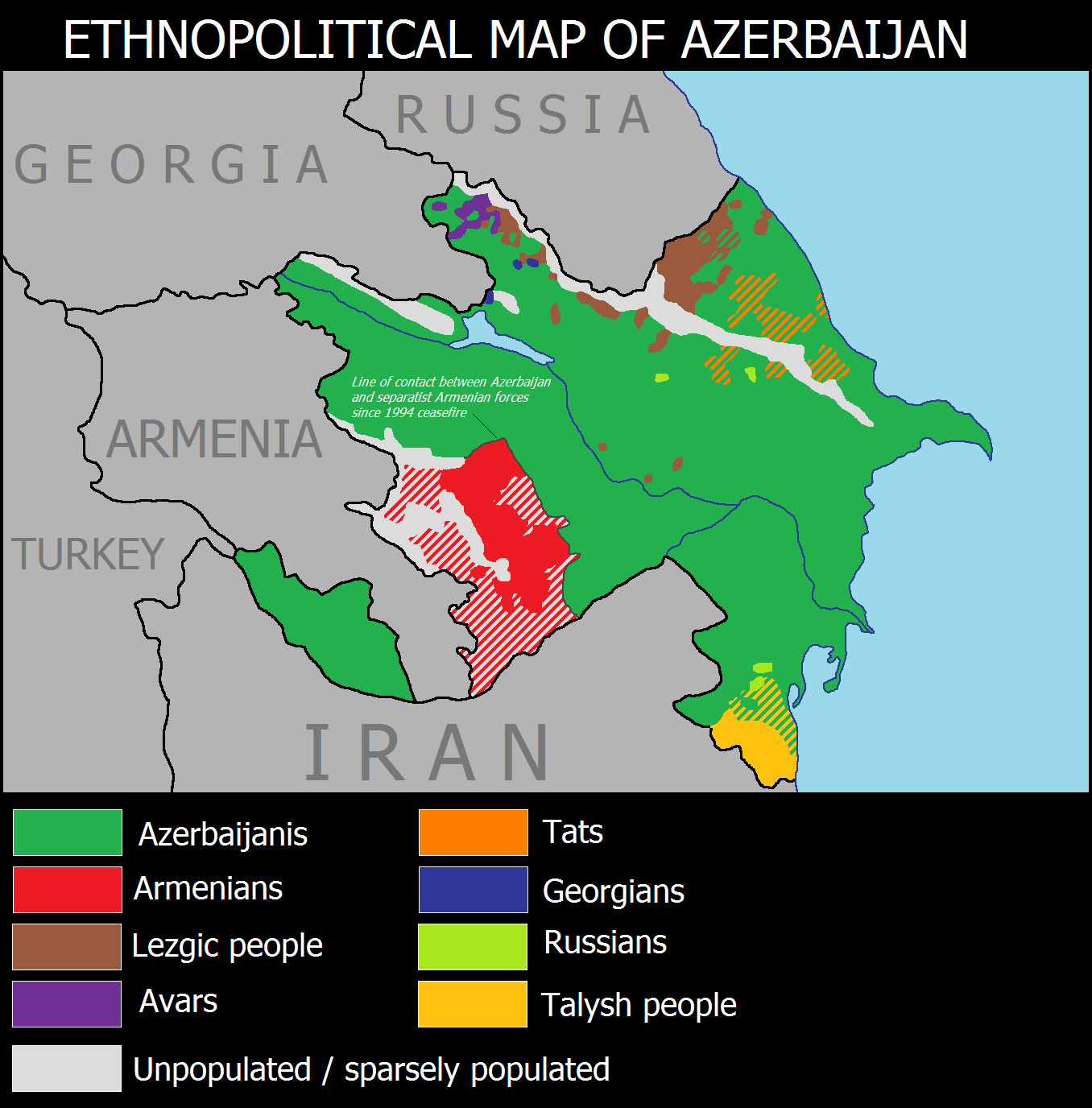
Ethnic composition of Azerbaijan (1994-2020, after the First Nagorno-Karabakh War and before the Second Nagorno-Karabakh War)

People in Azerbaijan (when it was still a part of the Russian Empire) were enumerated by native tongue in the 1897 Russian Empire Census. In addition to the Soviet Union enumerating people by ethnicity for its entire existence, Azerbaijan also enumerated people by ethnicity in its post-Soviet censuses of 1999 and 2009.

=== Bahrain ===
Bahrain enumerated people by ethnicity in 1965 and 2010. The 2010 Bahrain census also enumerated people by their religious beliefs.

=== Bangladesh ===
British India (which Bangladesh was a part of) enumerated its population by race between 1872 and 1941.

=== Brunei ===
Brunei enumerated people by ethnicity in all censuses since 1947.

=== Burma ===
The people in Burma (also known as Myanmar) were enumerated by ethnicity in 1931, and 1953. A new census which plans to enumerate the people of Burma by ethnicity and race is planned to be held in 2014. The 1931 Burmese census generated a lot of anger from non-Burmese ethnic groups who were marked as Burmese on the census. There is hope that the scheduled 2014 Burma Census will help empower the various ethnic groups in Burma.

=== China ===
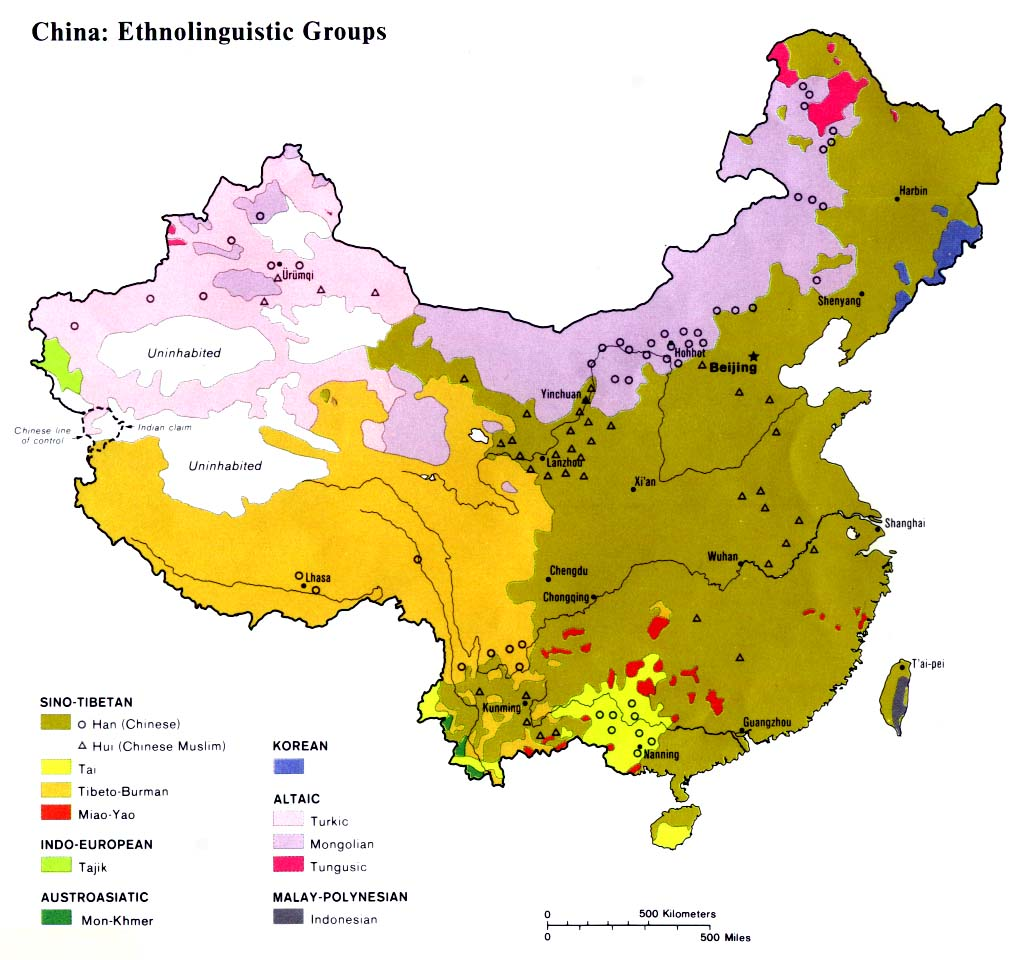
Ethnolinguistic groups in China in 1983

The People's Republic of China counted people by ethnicity since at least 1952 but does not count people by mother tongue.

=== Cyprus ===
The people of Cyprus were enumerated by ethnicity in 1960.

=== East Timor ===
East Timor enumerated its population by ethnicity in 1950.

=== Georgia ===
People in Georgia (when it was still a part of the Russian Empire) were enumerated by native tongue in the 1897 Russian Empire Census. In addition to the Soviet Union enumerating people by ethnicity for its entire existence, Georgia also enumerated people by ethnicity in both post-Soviet censuses in 2002 and 2014.

=== India ===
When it was a British colony, India enumerated its population by race between 1872 and 1941.

In 1872 the first British Indian colonial census classified the population into racial groups through their religion and castes. Later the census also included the categories of tribe and race, although Political Scientist Ram B. Bhagat states that “the distinction between them was often obscure”. Bhagat also claims that these classes were efforts to try to “identify a race within religion and religion within a race”. After the 1872 census, racial categories were only used for the Christian population. The five main categories used for this group were Native Indians, Asiatics, non- Asiatics, Mixed Races, and Mohammadian.

Drawing from the 1891 British Indian census, the top religious practices were Hinduism at 72.32% of the population, Islamic at 19.96%, and tribal at 3.23%. Although these primary religious groups are connected to various races and castes, they created a foundation for enumerating racial groups in India. Writing in 1908, British anthropologist and physiognomist Herbert Hope Risley stated that “the population of India consisted of seven basic types: Mongoloid, Dravidian, Indo-Aryans, Turko-Iranian, Mongolo-Dravidian, Aryo-Dravidian’ Scytho-Dravidian". These do not just highlight the classifications for race but also how British India viewed these groups as racially distinctive.

=== Indonesia ===
Ethnic composition of Indonesia

Indonesia enumerated people by ethnicity in 1930, 2000, and 2010 but not in any other censuses.

=== Israel ===
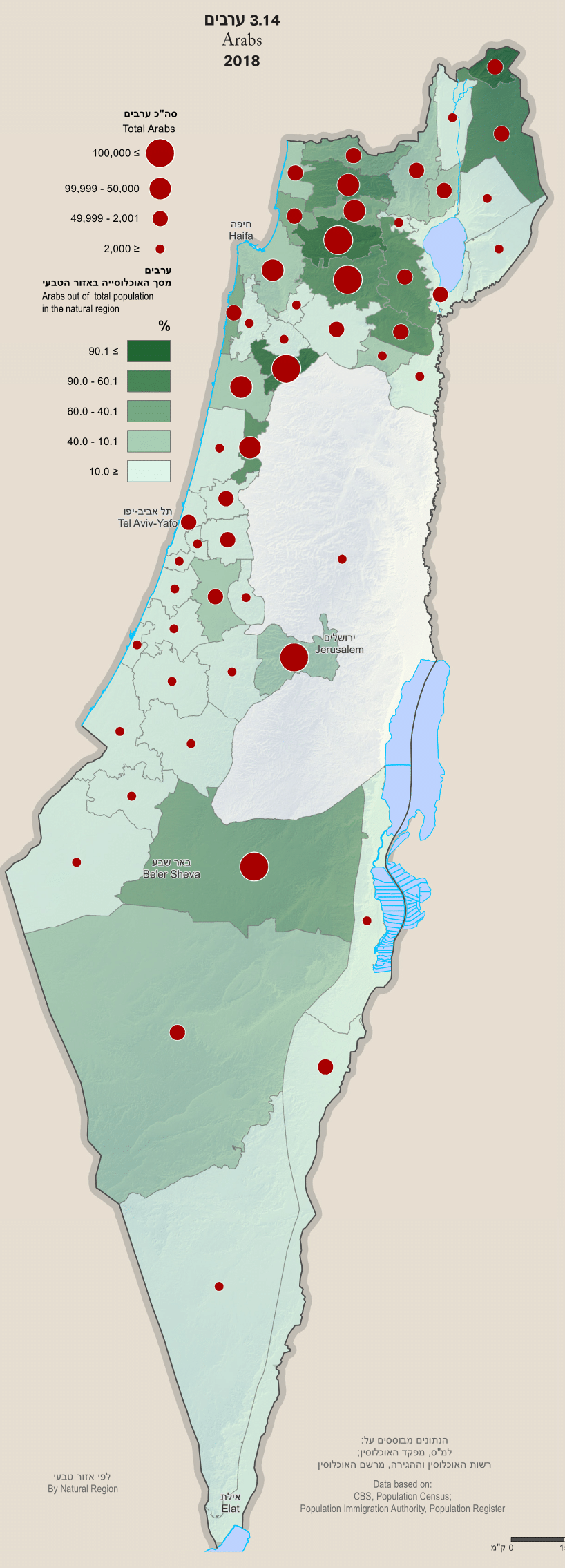
Arabs in Israel, by natural region, 2018

The census in Israel directly asked people about their ethnicity only in 1983. However, Israel has used the religion question on its census to determine the ethnic composition of its population from 1948 to the present day. Israel has enumerated its Jewish population by their continent of birth since 1948.

=== Kazakhstan ===
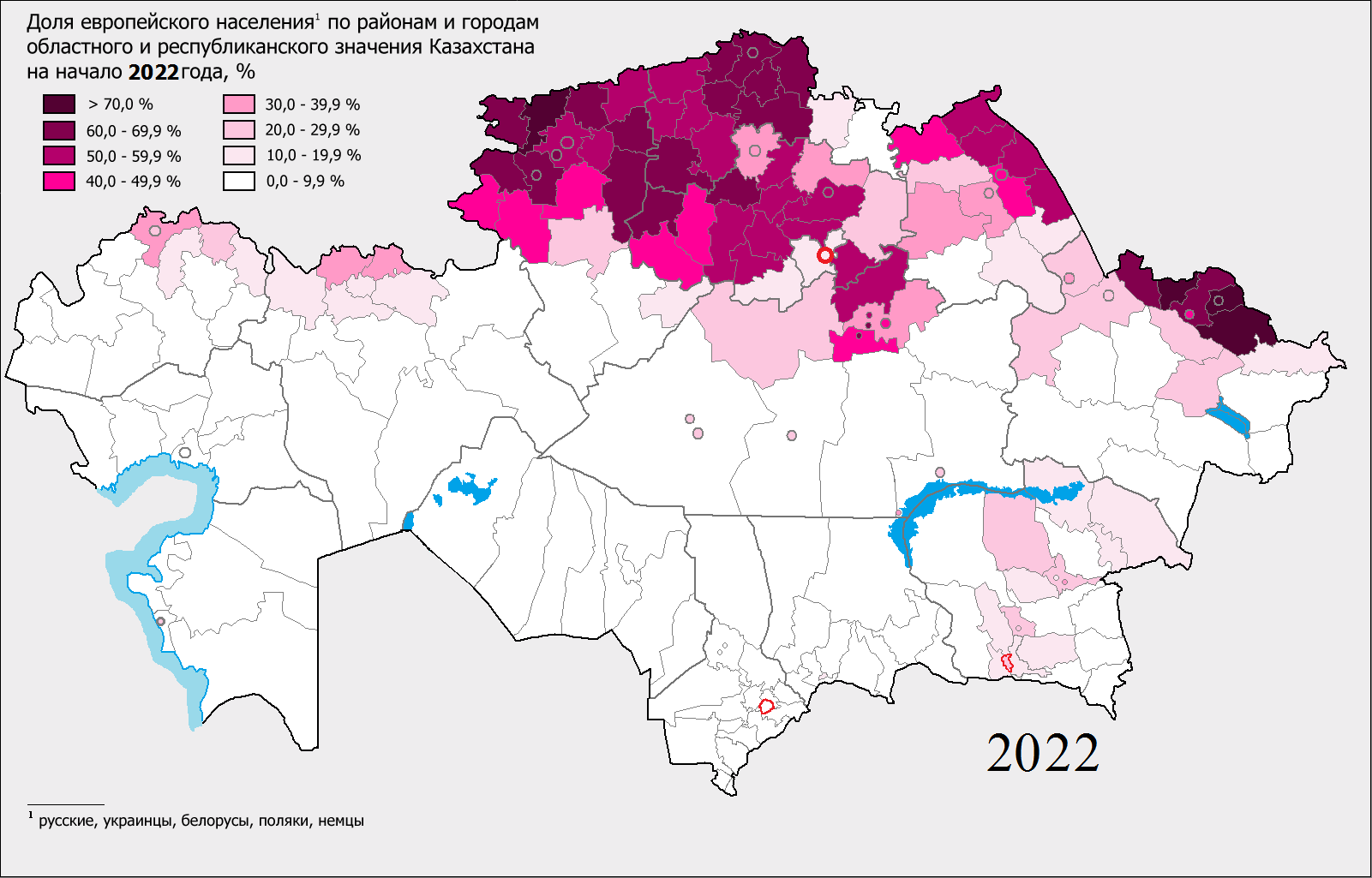
European ethnicities as a percentage of the total population in Kazakhstan in 2022 (Note: map is in Russian.)

People in Kazakhstan (when it was still a part of the Russian Empire) were enumerated by native tongue in the 1897 Russian Empire Census. In addition to the Soviet Union enumerating people by ethnicity for its entire existence, Kazakhstan also enumerated people by ethnicity in its post-Soviet censuses of 1999 and 2009.

=== Kyrgyzstan ===
People in Kyrgyzstan (when it was still a part of the Russian Empire) were enumerated by native tongue in the 1897 Russian Empire Census. In addition to the Soviet Union enumerating people by ethnicity for its entire existence, Kyrgyzstan also enumerated people by ethnicity in its post-Soviet censuses of 1999 and 2009.

=== Malaysia ===
People in Malaysia were enumerated by ethnicity/race from 1871 to the present day.

=== Mongolia ===
Mongolia enumerated people by ethnicity in 1963 and 2000.

=== Nagorno-Karabakh ===
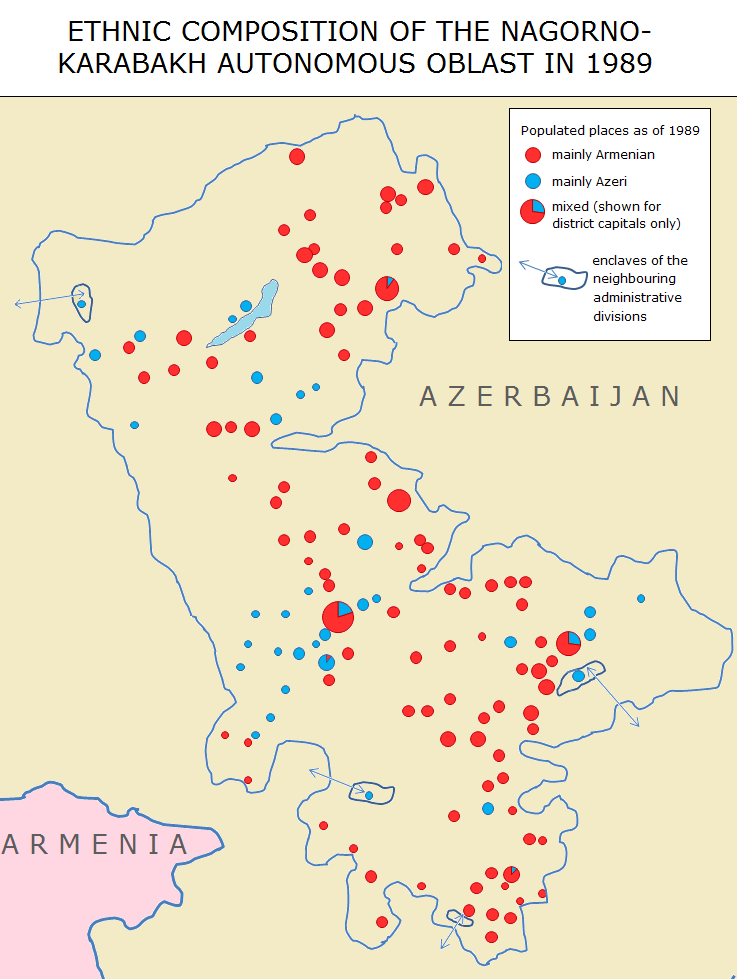
Ethnic composition of Nagorno Karabakh in 1989

People in Nagorno-Karabakh (when it was still a part of the Russian Empire) were enumerated by native tongue in the 1897 Russian Empire Census. In addition to the Soviet Union enumerating people by ethnicity for its entire existence, the de facto independent state of Nagorno-Karabakh also enumerated people by ethnicity in its only post-Soviet census of 2005.

=== Nepal ===
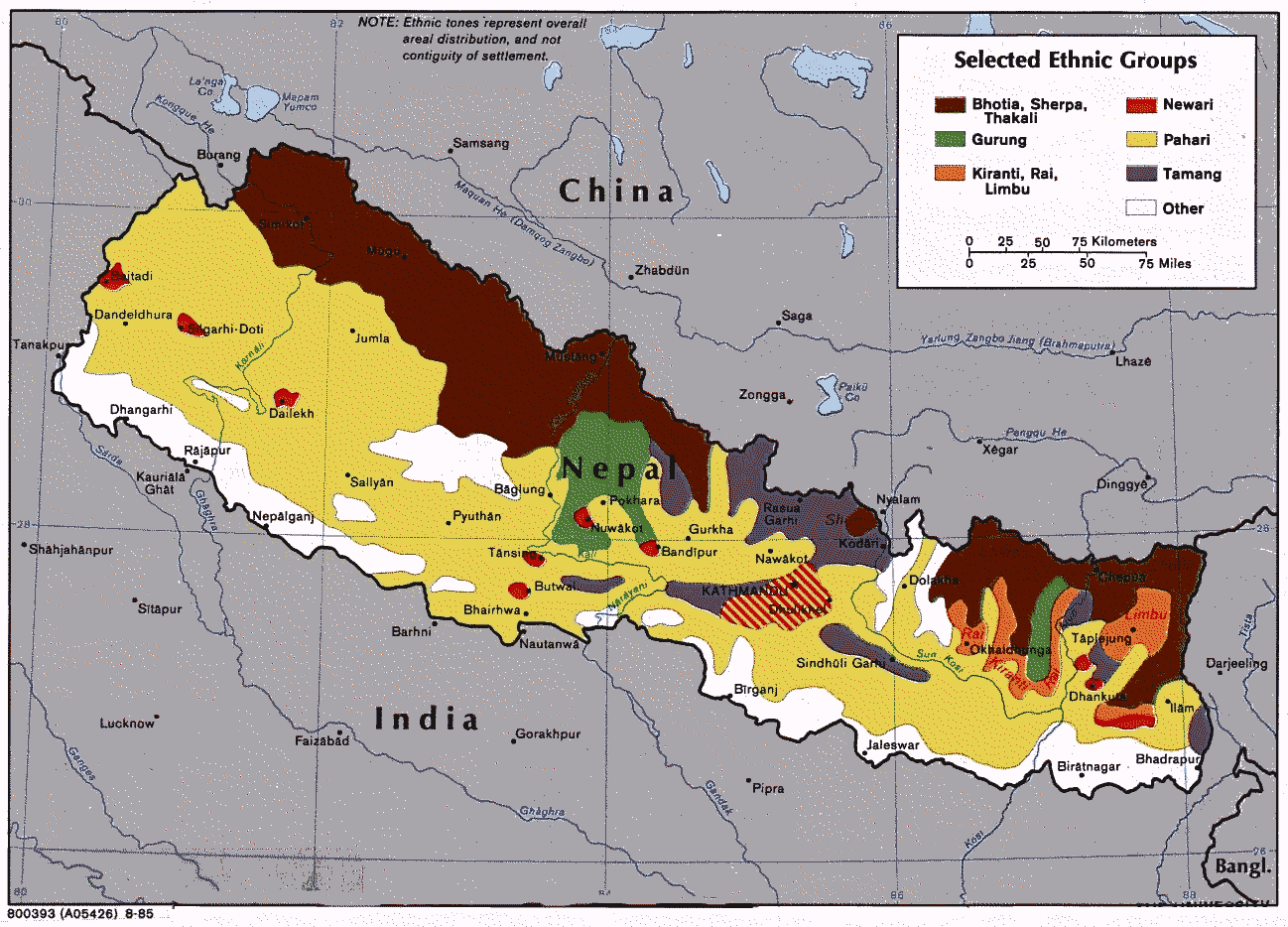
Ethnic composition of Nepal (Note that Kulu Rodu (Kulung) territories are mistakenly marked as Tamu/Gurung territories in this map.)

Nepal enumerated people by ethnicity in 1991 and 2001.

=== Pakistan ===
British India (which Pakistan was a part of) enumerated its population by race between 1872 and 1941.

=== Palestine ===
The population in the Palestinian territories was enumerated by ethnicity in 1997.

=== Philippines ===
Ethnic composition of the Philippines in 2000

The Philippines enumerated their population by ethnicity in 1948, 1970, 2000, and 2010.

=== Russia/Soviet Union ===
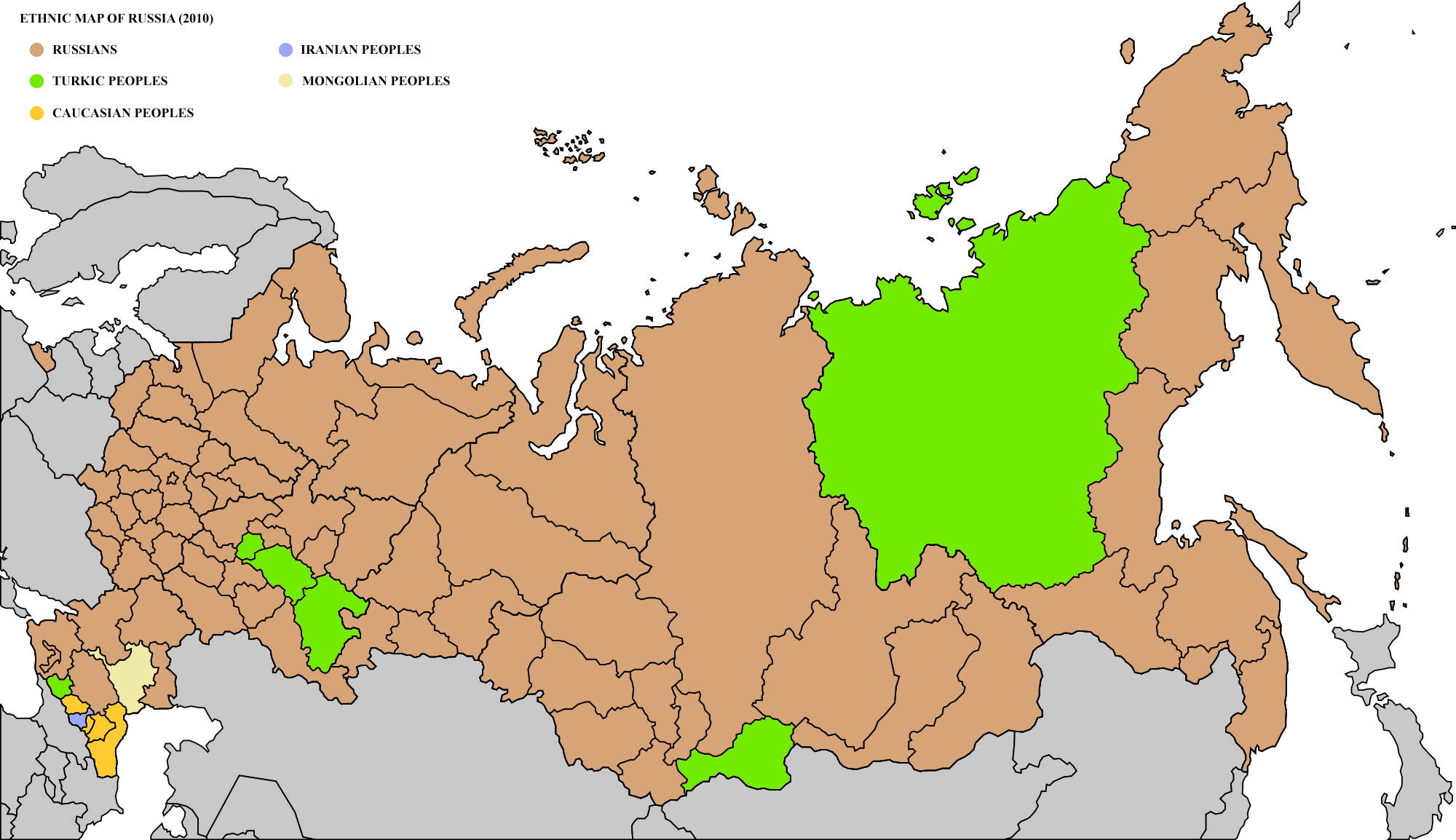
Dominant ethnicity in each Russian oblast in 2010

The Russian Empire began counting people by native tongue with its first modern census in 1897. In 1920, the Soviet Union replaced this question with a question about ethnicity. The Soviet government organized lists of ethnicities and wanted to shape these various ethnic groups in the mold of Communism. In the words of Soviet politician Anastas Mikoyan, the Soviet Union was "creating and organising new nations" The government of the U.S.S.R. was eager to get ethnic data for many ethnic groups in order to create republics and autonomous regions for many of these ethnic groups and nationalities, and later on (under Joseph Stalin) in order to deport some of them. The Bolsheviks also wanted to get more support from ethnic minority groups within the Soviet Union, many of whom were previously oppressed under Tsarist rule. The Soviet Union continued to ask about ethnicity for the rest of its existence, and Russia also asked about ethnicity in its two post-Soviet censuses of 2002 and 2010. Unlike in 1989, the 2002 census did not require respondents to prove their ethnicity/nationality when they responded to this question. The number of ethnicity/nationality options available on Soviet censuses was enormous—the Soviet Union offered 194 different choices for ethnicity/nationality in its 1926 census. There were 97 options in 1939, 126 options in 1959, 122 options in 1970, 123 options in 1979, and 128 options for the Soviet Union in 1989. There were 192 ethnicity/nationality options for Russia in 2002.

=== Singapore ===
The people in Singapore were numerated by ethnicity from at least 1947 up to the most recent Singaporean census in 2010.

=== Sri Lanka ===
Sri Lanka enumerated its population by ethnicity in 1971, 1981, and 2012.

=== Tajikistan ===
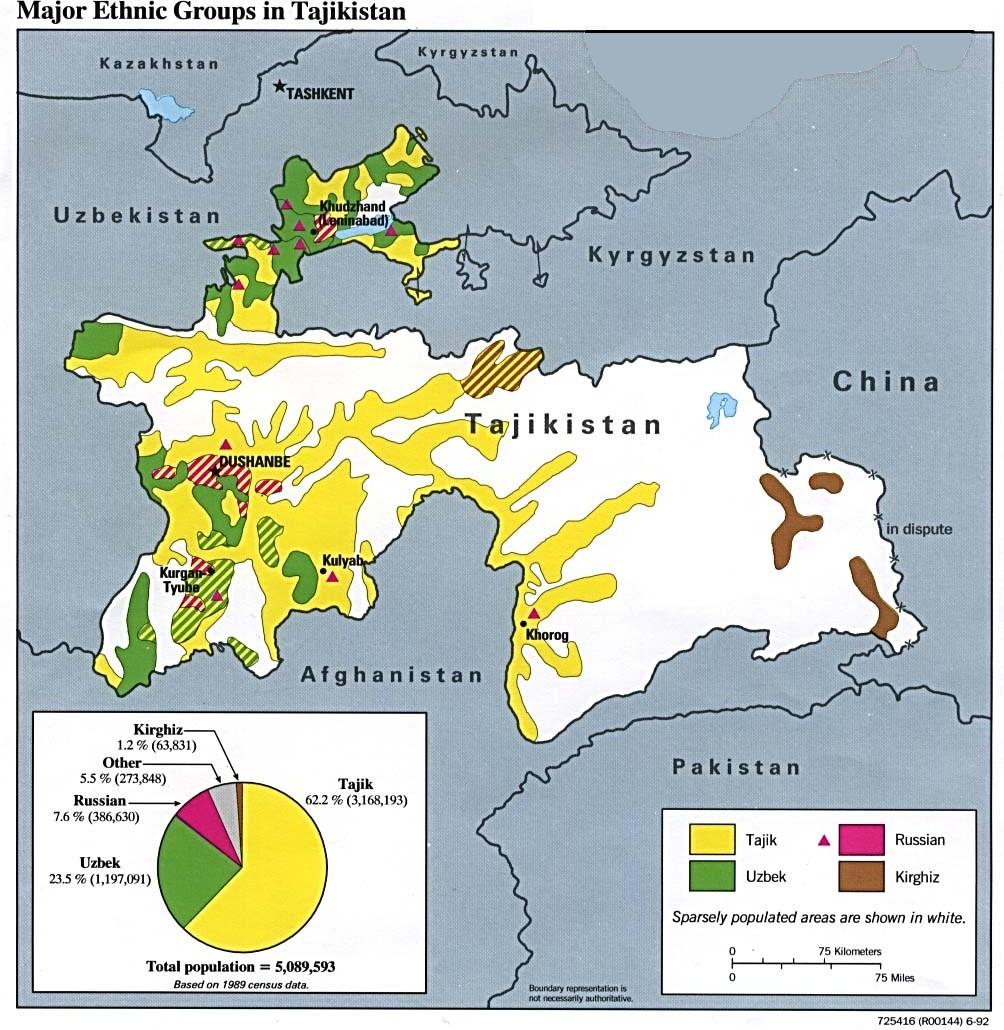
Ethnic composition of Tajikistan in 1992

People in Tajikistan (when it was still a part of the Russian Empire) were enumerated by native tongue in the 1897 Russian Empire Census. In addition to the Soviet Union enumerating people by ethnicity for its entire existence, Tajikistan also enumerated people by ethnicity in its post-Soviet censuses in 2000 and 2010.

=== Thailand ===
Ethnic composition of Thailand in 1974

Thailand enumerated people by ethnicity in 1947.

=== Turkey ===
Between 1881 and 1893 the Ottoman Empire implemented its first census, which enumerated the people in the empire by ethnicity. Some other censuses and studies were conducted in the Ottoman Empire for enumerating the population by ethnicity after the first Ottoman census. After the dissolution of the Ottoman Empire, the first census of the Republic was held in 1927. The last Turkish census to enumerate people based on their native tongue was held in 1965.

In 2009, a proposal for native tongue question to be asked again on the upcoming 2011 census was made by Member of the Parliament Hasip Kaplan.

=== Turkmenistan ===
People in Turkmenistan (when it was still a part of the Russian Empire) were enumerated by native tongue in the 1897 Russian Empire Census. In addition to the Soviet Union enumerating people by ethnicity for its entire existence, Turkmenistan also enumerated people by ethnicity in its only post-Soviet census in 1995.

=== Uzbekistan ===
People in Uzbekistan (when it was still a part of the Russian Empire) were enumerated by native tongue in the 1897 Russian Empire Census. The Soviet Union (to which Uzbekistan also belonged) enumerated people by ethnicity for its entire existence. Uzbekistan has not conducted any censuses at all since 1989.

=== Vietnam ===
Communist North Vietnam enumerated people by ethnicity in 1960, when Vietnam was still divided into two countries. After Vietnamese reunification, Vietnam enumerated its population by ethnicity from 1979 up to the most recent census in 2019.

=== Yemen ===
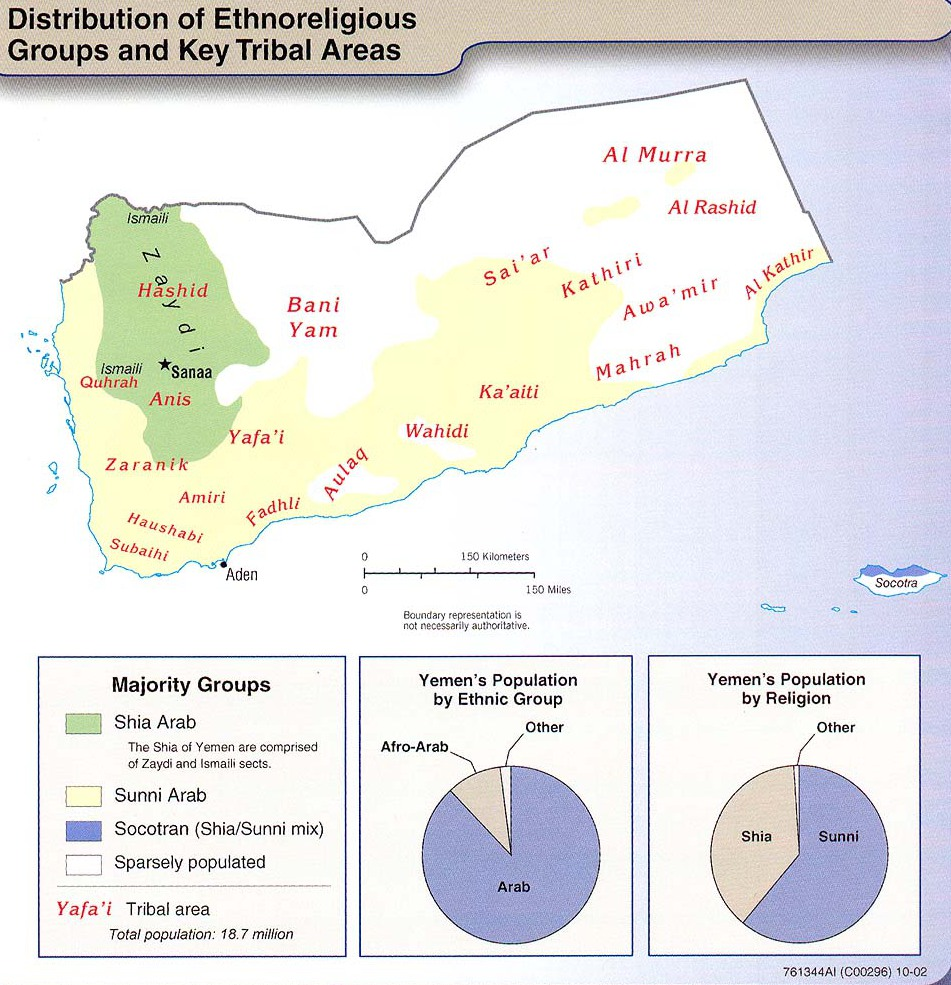
Ethnoreligious composition of Yemen in 2002

Yemen enumerated its population by ethnicity in 1994. The British Colony of Aden (which is within Yemen's current borders) enumerated its population by ethnicity in 1946 and 1955.

== Europe ==
=== Albania ===
Albania enumerated people by ethnicity in 1955, 1989, and 2011. The 2011 Albanian census also enumerated people by language used and by their religious beliefs.

=== Belarus ===
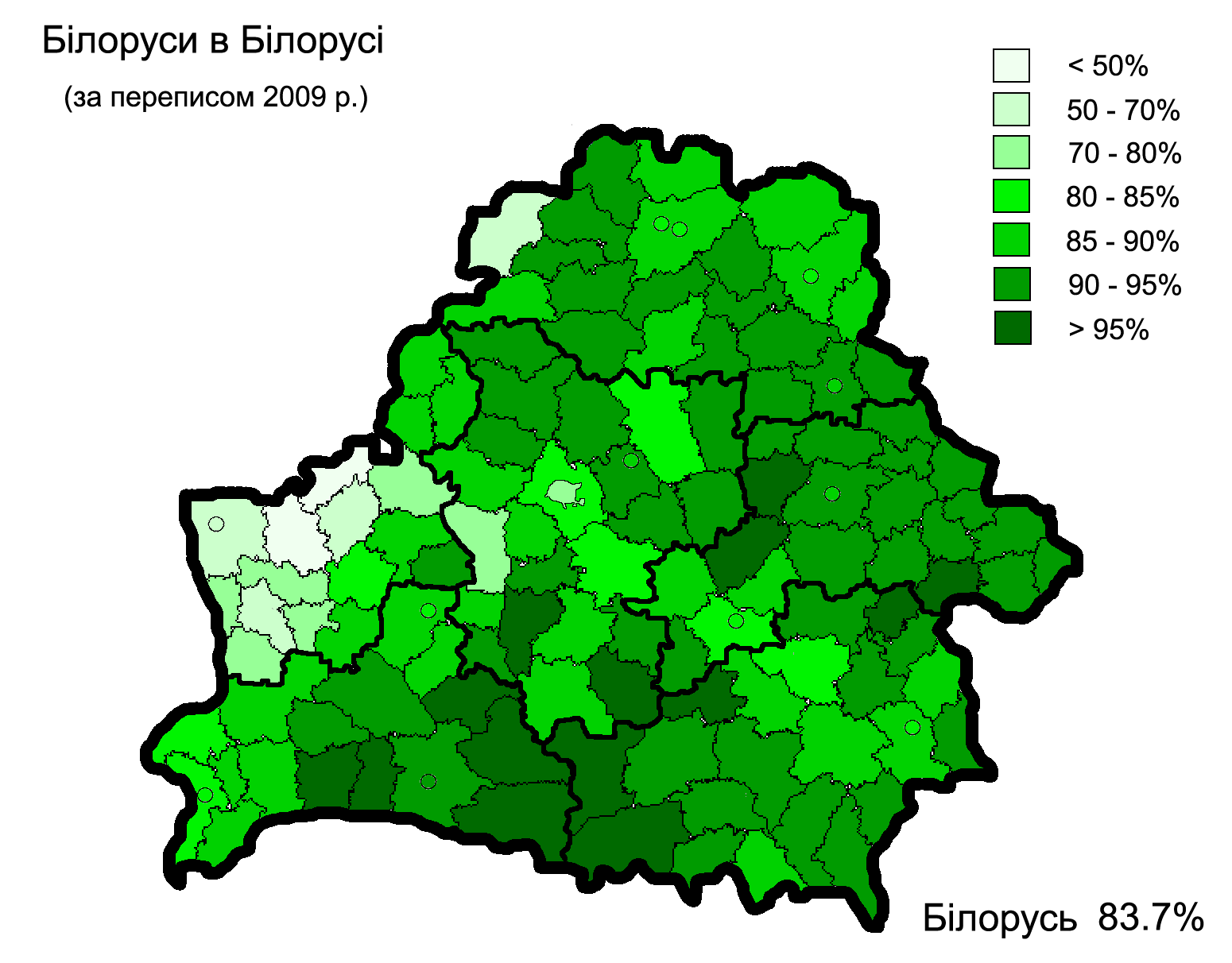
Belarusians as a percentage of the total population in Belarus in 2009 (Note: map is in Ukrainian.)

People in Belarus (when it was still a part of the Russian Empire) were enumerated by native tongue in the 1897 Russian Empire Census. In addition to the Soviet Union enumerating people by ethnicity for its entire existence, Belarus also enumerated people by ethnicity in its post-Soviet censuses of 1999 and 2009.

=== Bosnia and Herzegovina ===
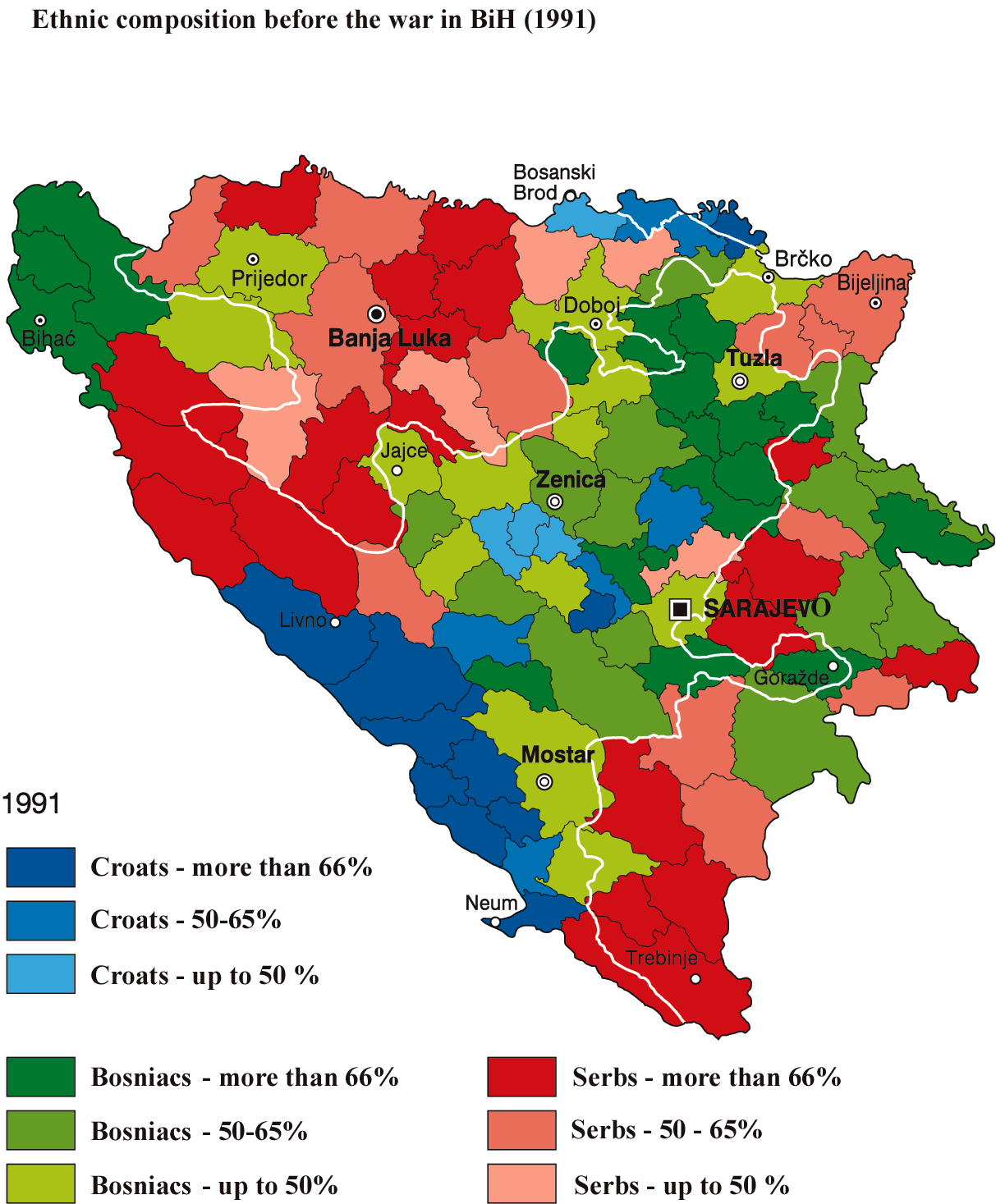
Ethnic composition of Bosnia and Herzegovina in 1991

The population of Bosnia and Herzegovina has been enumerated by ethnicity since at least 1885, including the recent censuses in 1991 and 2013.

=== Bulgaria ===
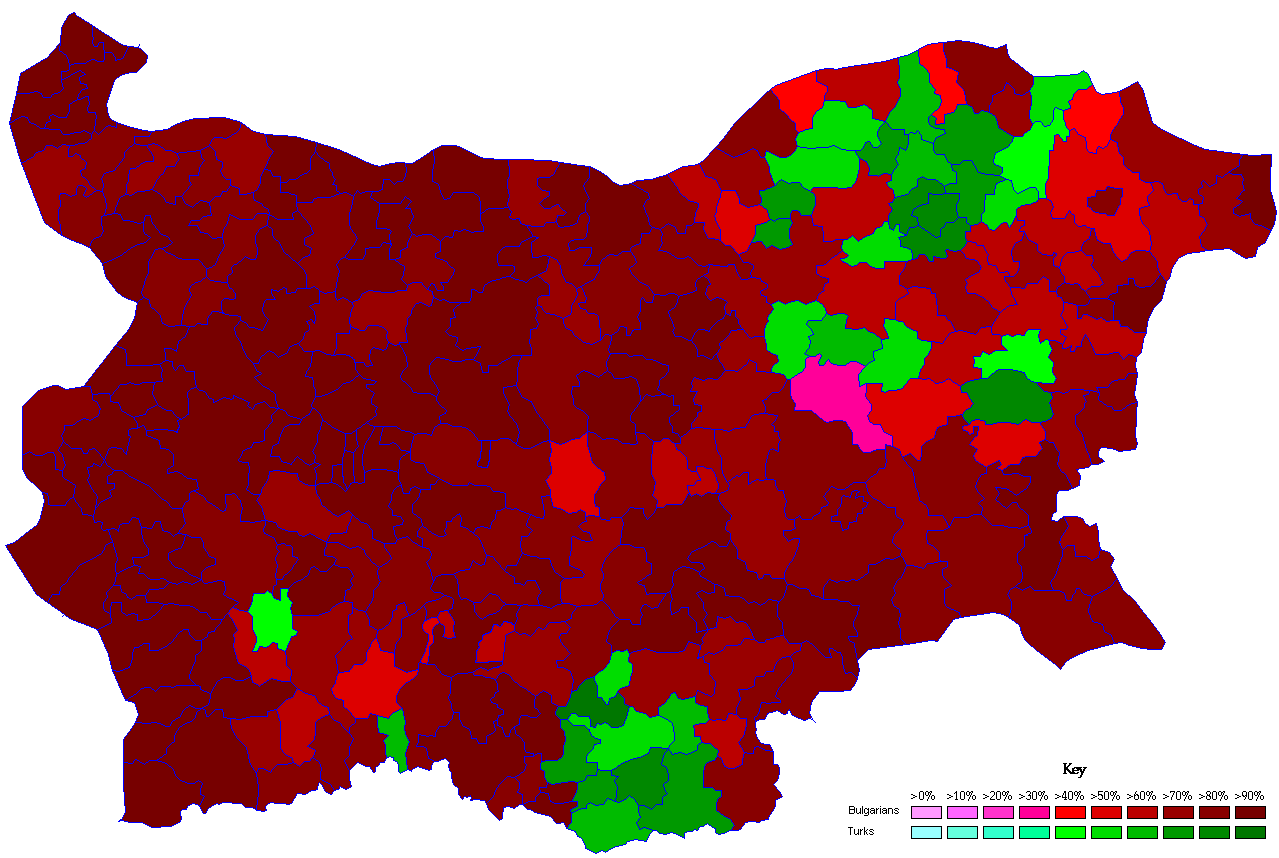
Dominant ethnicities in Bulgaria in 2011

Bulgaria enumerated people by mother tongue in 1880 and 1887 and used this info to determine their ethnicities. Bulgaria directly enumerated people by ethnicity from 1900 all the way up to its most recent census in 2011, with the exception of the 1985 census.

=== Croatia ===
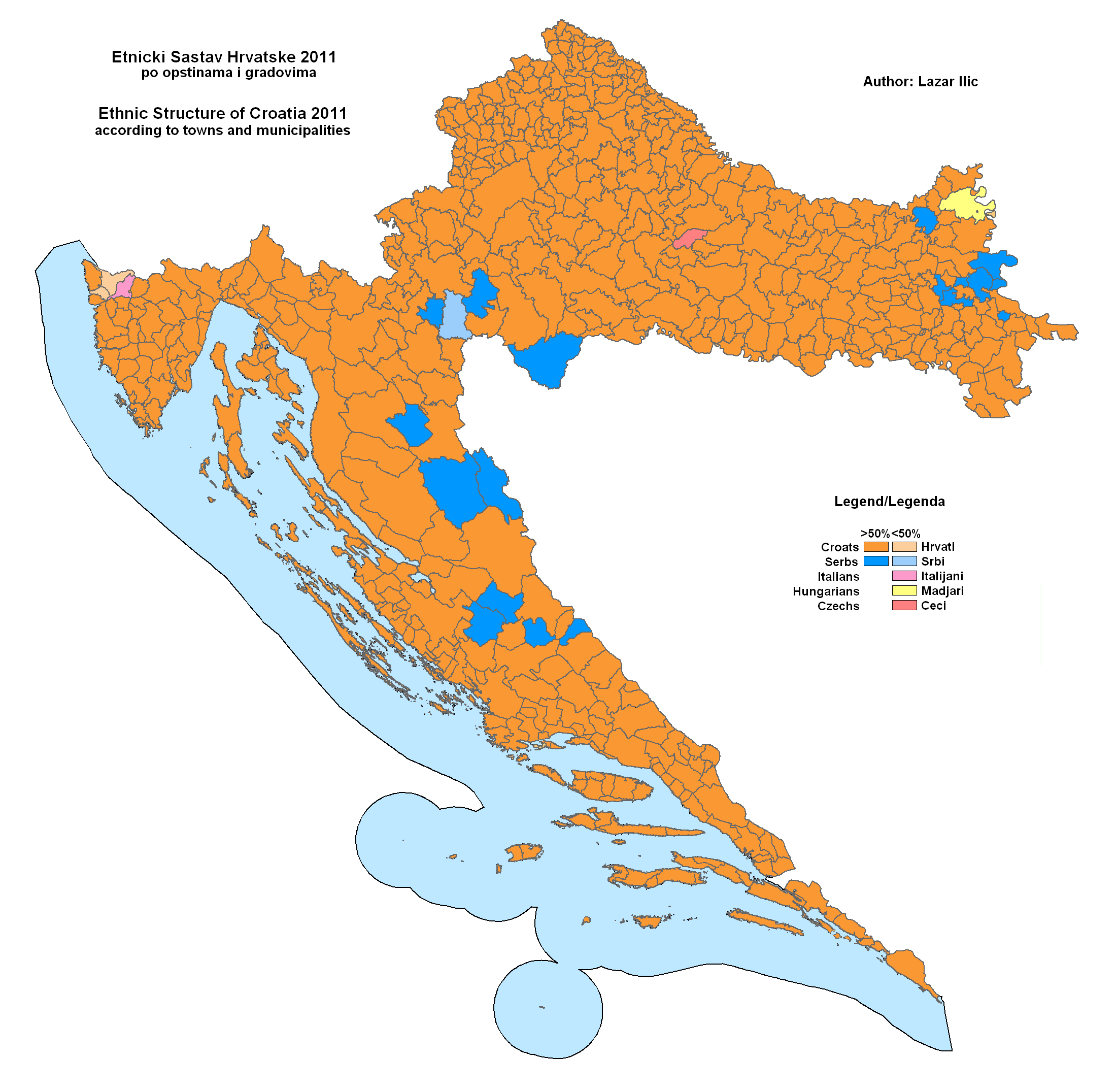
Ethnic composition of Croatia in 2011

The people of Croatia have been enumerated by ethnicity/nationality from at least 1953, including the censuses of 2001 and 2011.

=== Czech Republic ===
Czechoslovakia (of which the territory of the Czech Republic was a part) enumerated people by ethnicity in 1921 and 1930, and the Czech Republic did the same thing from 1991 to the present day.

=== Estonia ===
People in Estonia were enumerated by ethnicity/nationality from 1922 to the present day. People in Estonia were also enumerated by native tongue in the 1897 Russian Empire Census. During this time period Estonia was under the control of the Russian Empire, then independent, then (excluding World War II) under the Soviet occupation and then independent again since 1991. There were 192 different ethnicity/nationality options in the 2011 Estonian census.

=== Finland ===
Finland has enumerated its population by language of most frequent use from at least 1990 to the present day.

=== France ===
France has not counted individuals by race or ethnicity since at least 1978, when a law was passed that prevented individuals from being enumerated by these categories without their consent or a state committee waiver. The reasons for this are that many French people consider asking people about race and ethnicity to be a contradiction of their principle of equality and equal treatment for all French people. Also, there is a desire to avoid repeating what Vichy France did in regards to its Jewish population and to prevent the National Front from getting more popularity. Former French President Nicolas Sarkozy and his administration supported and proposed counting French people by race and ethnicity, though this was never implemented.

=== Germany ===
Nazi Germany enumerated its citizens of Jewish descent in 1939 based on the percent of Jewish ancestry that they had.

=== Hungary ===
Ethnic composition of the regions of Austria-Hungary in 1910

Hungary enumerated people by ethnicity in 1880, between 1900 and 1941, and again from 1980 to the present day

=== Ireland ===
The 2002 Irish census enumerated people by their place of birth and their country of citizenship. Ireland introduced an ethnicity question to its census in 2006. The 2011 Irish census enumerated people by ethnicity as well, and offered the options White Irish, White Irish Traveller, Other White, Black or Black Irish (with options for African and Other Black), Asian or Asian Irish (with options for Chinese and Other Asian), Other, and Not Stated.

=== Italy ===
Censuses in Italy do not inquire about race or ethnicity. Only information disposable are those of civil registers, where only the country of birth is noted down.

=== Kosovo ===
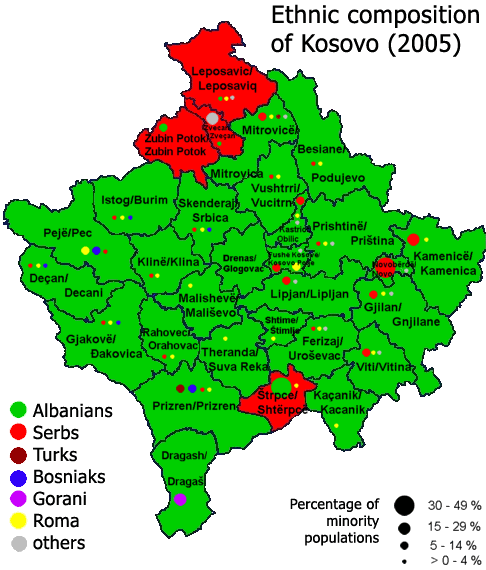
Dominant ethnicities in Kosovo in 2005

The population of Kosovo was enumerated by ethnicity from 1990s all the way up to the present day.

=== Latvia ===
Ethnic Russians as a percentage of the total population in the Baltic States 2011

People in Latvia (when it was still a part of the Russian Empire) were enumerated by native tongue in the 1897 Russian Empire Census. Latvia enumerated people by ethnicity between 1920 and 1935. During the Soviet occupation in 1940 and from 1959 to 1989, people were enumerated by the ethnicity. Latvia also enumerated people by ethnicity in its censuses of 2000 and 2011.

=== Lithuania ===
People in Lithuania (when it was still a part of the Russian Empire) were enumerated by native tongue in the 1897 Russian Empire Census. Lithuania enumerated people by ethnicity in its 1923 census and in its 1925 census of its Klaipėda region. During the Soviet occupation in 1940 and from 1959 to 1989, people were enumerated by the ethnicity. Lithuania also enumerated people by ethnicity in its censuses of 2001 and 2011.

=== Luxembourg ===
It is illegal to collect statistics about the race, ethnicity, religion or ancestry of Luxembourg citizens.

=== Moldova ===
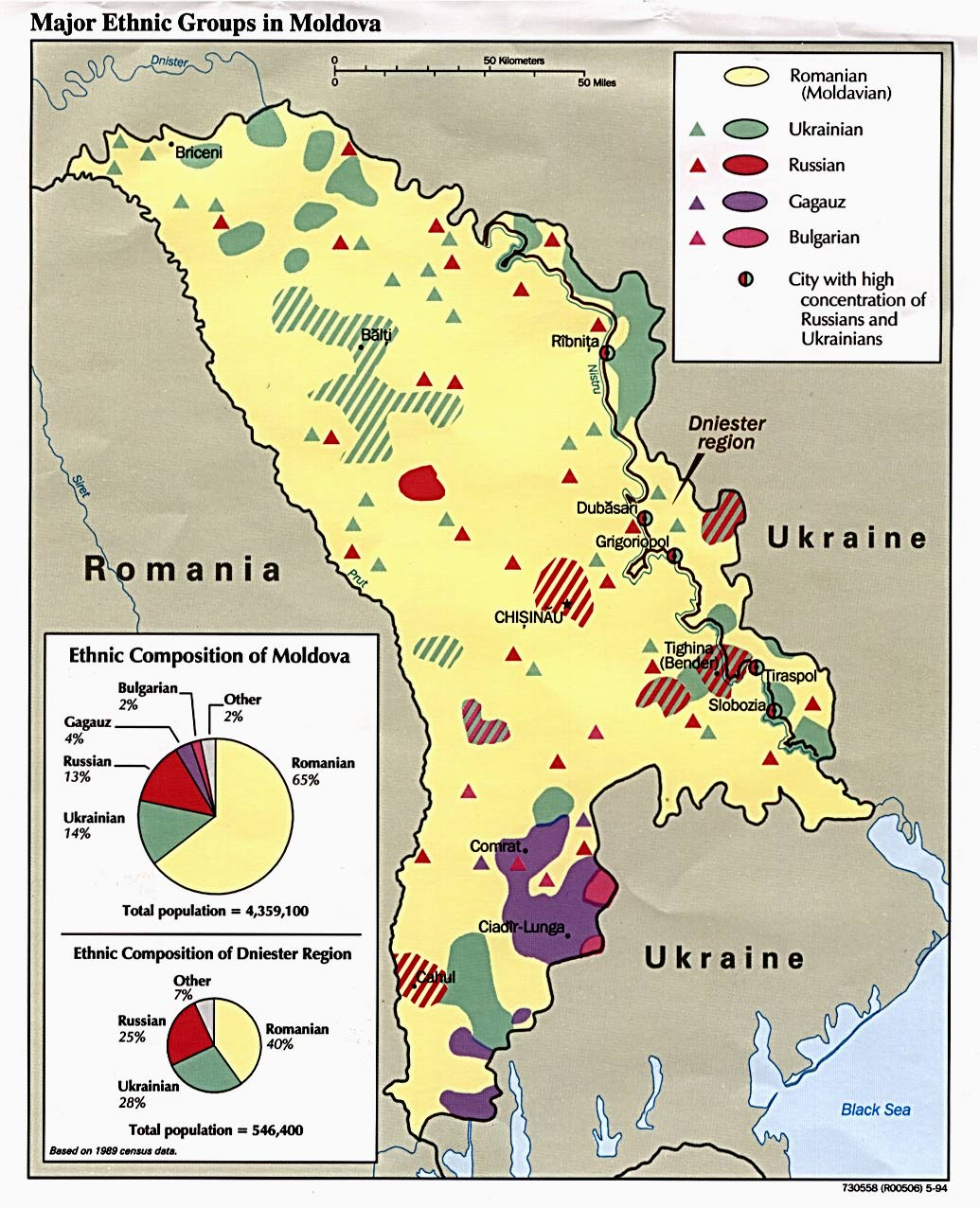
Ethnic composition of Moldova in 1989

People in Moldova (when it was still a part of the Russian Empire) were enumerated by native tongue in the 1897 Russian Empire Census. In addition to the Soviet Union enumerating people by ethnicity for its entire existence, Moldova also enumerated people by ethnicity in both its post-Soviet censuses: in 2004, and 2014.

=== Monaco ===
Monaco enumerated people by ethnicity in 1982.

=== Montenegro ===
Dominant ethnicities in Montenegro in 2011

The population of Montenegro was enumerated by ethnicity from 1909 up to its most recent census in 2011.

=== Netherlands ===
In the Netherlands, census data is collected by the Centraal Bureau voor de Statistiek (Statistics Netherlands), which is distinguished according to country of birth rather than ethnicity or race. Data is collected according to four main categories: Dutch citizen born in the Netherlands with both parents born in the Netherlands, Dutch citizen born in the Netherlands with one parent born in a different country, Dutch citizen born in the Netherlands with both parents born in a different country, or Dutch born in a foreign country.

=== North Macedonia ===
Ethnic composition of North Macedonia in 2002

People in North Macedonia were enumerated by ethnicity/nationality from at least 1921 all the way up to the present day. In the most recent census in 2002, 64.2% of the population declared themselves to be ethnic Macedonians. The second-largest ethnic group in the country was the ethnic Albanians with 25.2%. Other major ethnic groups were Turks (3.9%), Romani (2.7%), and Serbs (1.8%).

=== Norway ===
Norway enumerated the population in the northern part of the country by ethnicity between 1845 and 1930. In the census of 1970, in limited areas in Northern Norway, people were identified by ethnicity and language. Such information has not been included in any census since then.

=== Poland ===
People in Poland (when the country was still occupied by the Russian Empire) were enumerated allegedly by their native tongue in the 1897 Russian Empire Census. Sovereign Poland enumerated people by ethnicity/nationality in 1921. It enumerated people by mother tongue in 1931, and used this data to determine ethnicity/nationality. After World War II, the Communist Polish government did not enumerate people by nationality/ethnicity. The post-Communist 2002 Polish census did enumerate people by nationality/ethnicity and language used at home.

=== Portugal ===
Census in Portugal do not include a question regarding individuals ethnic or racial background. A question of this kind was recommended to be included for the first time for the 2021 census ("Censos 2021"), which sparked some controversy. The question was ultimately not included, although a question about religion was included. A questionnaire regarding ethnicity was planned by the Instituto Nacional de Estatística for late 2021.

=== Romania ===
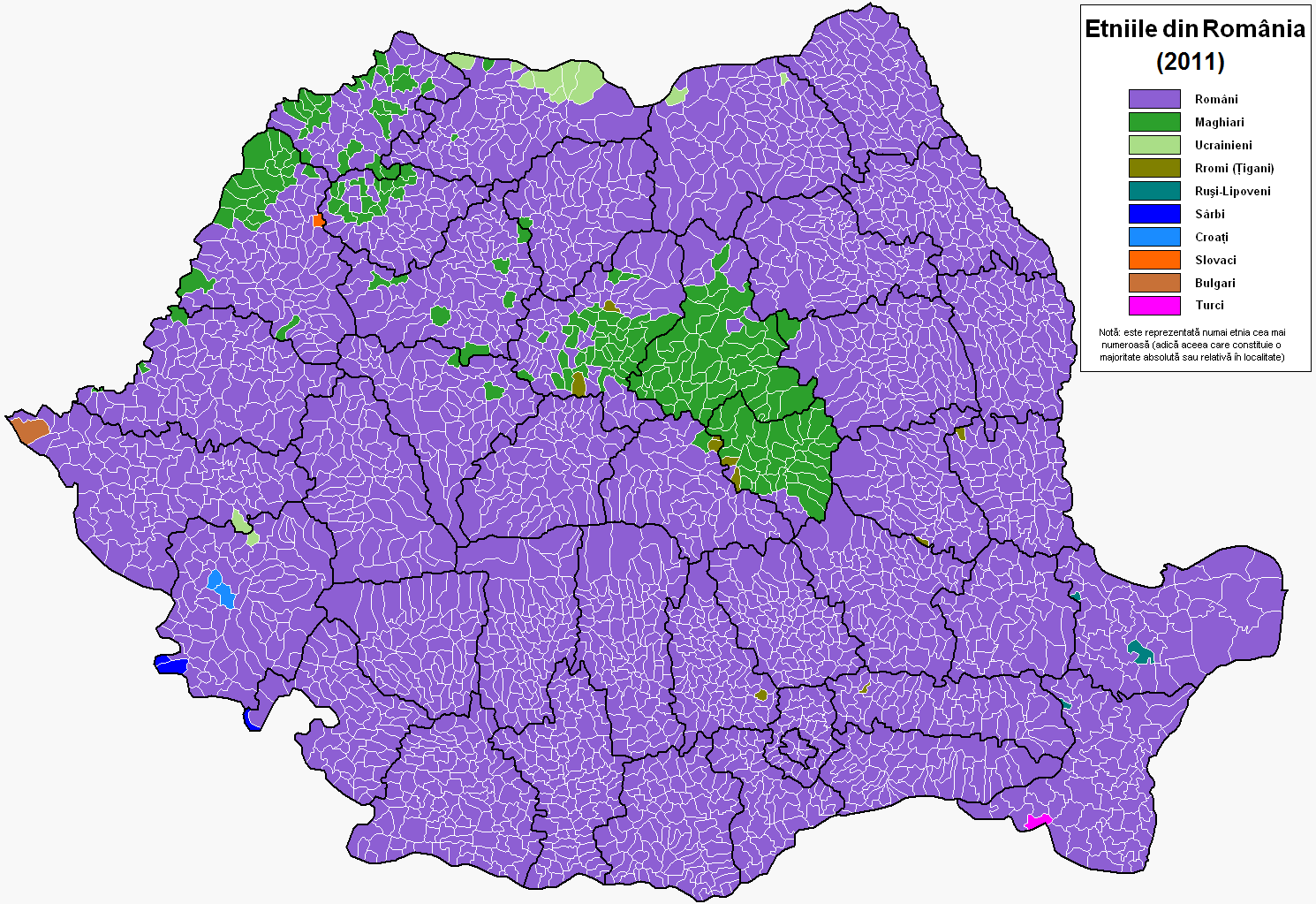
Ethnic map of Romania in 2011

Romania enumerated people by ethnicity in 1859–1860, 1887, 1899, and in every census since 1930, with the exception of the 1948 census, which enumerated people only by mother tongue. The World Jewish Congress also carried out a census of Romania's Jewish population in 1947.

=== Serbia ===
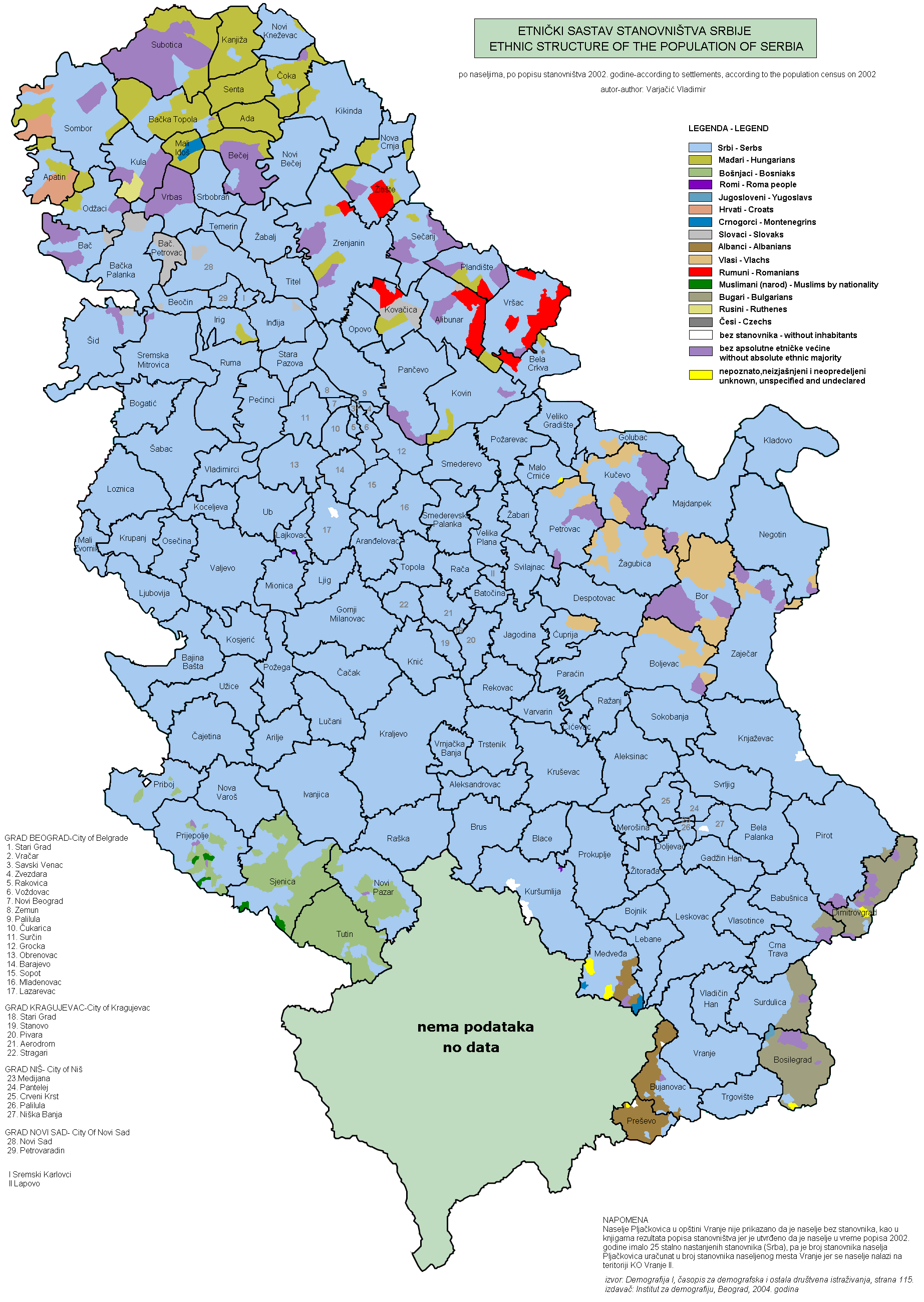
Ethnic composition of Serbia in 2002

In addition to Yugoslavia enumerating people by ethnicity/nationality, Serbia enumerated people by ethnicity/nationality in its 2002 and 2011 censuses.

=== Slovakia ===
The population of Slovakia was enumerated by ethnicity/nationality since 1910 all the way up to the present day.

=== Slovenia ===
The population of Slovenia was enumerated by ethnicity since 1953 all the way up to the present day.

=== Transnistria ===
People in Transnistria (when it was still a part of the Russian Empire) were enumerated by native tongue in the 1897 Russian Empire Census. In addition to the Soviet Union enumerating people by ethnicity for its entire existence, the de facto independent country of Transnistria also enumerated people by ethnicity in its post-Soviet censuses in 2004 and 2015. Romania also enumerated people in Transnistria by ethnicity in its 1941 census.

=== Ukraine ===
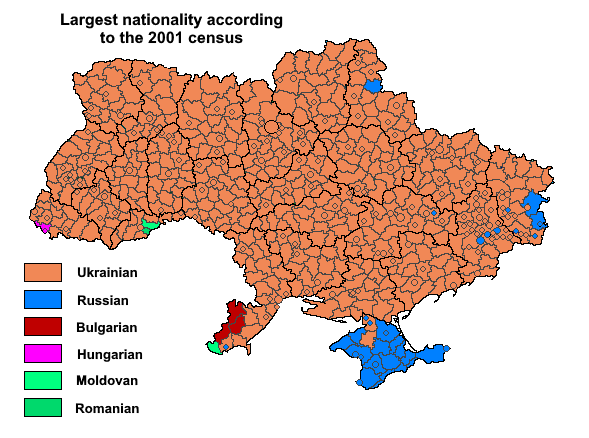
Ethnic composition of Ukraine in 2001

People in Ukraine (when it was still a part of the Russian Empire) were enumerated by native tongue in the 1897 Russian Empire Census. In addition to the Soviet Union enumerating people by ethnicity for its entire existence, Ukraine also enumerated people by ethnicity in its only post-Soviet census in 2001.

=== United Kingdom ===
In the United Kingdom, the censuses of Great Britain began counting people by ethnicity in 1991, with Northern Ireland following in 2001. There eventually became more of an interest in enumerating ethnic minorities after large-scale racial minority immigration to the United Kingdom began in the post-World War II era. The United Kingdom previously planned to enumerate people by ethnicity in 1981, but changed its mind after the large non-response rate to this question in the 1979 Test Census. In 1979, many ethnic minorities refused to answer this question due to the fear of deportation. In the 2011 census, the ethnic group options for England and Wales were White, Mixed, Asian British, Black British, Chinese or other ethnic group, and Not stated, with ethnic origin sub-group choices for most of these. The census in the United Kingdom also included a question on country of citizenship between 1851 and 1961.

=== Vatican City ===
Vatican City enumerated people by ethnicity in 1948.

== North America ==
=== Bahamas ===
The population of the Bahamas was enumerated by ethnicity in 1953 and again in 2010.

=== Barbados ===
The population of Barbados was enumerated by ethnicity in 1946, 1960, 1970, and 1980.

=== Belize ===
Back when Belize was British Honduras, it enumerated people by ethnicity in 1946. Since gaining independence, Belize has enumerated people by ethnicity from 1980 all the way up to its most recent census in 2010.

=== Bermuda ===
The people of Bermuda were enumerated by ethnicity since at least 1950 all the way up to the present day.

=== Canada ===
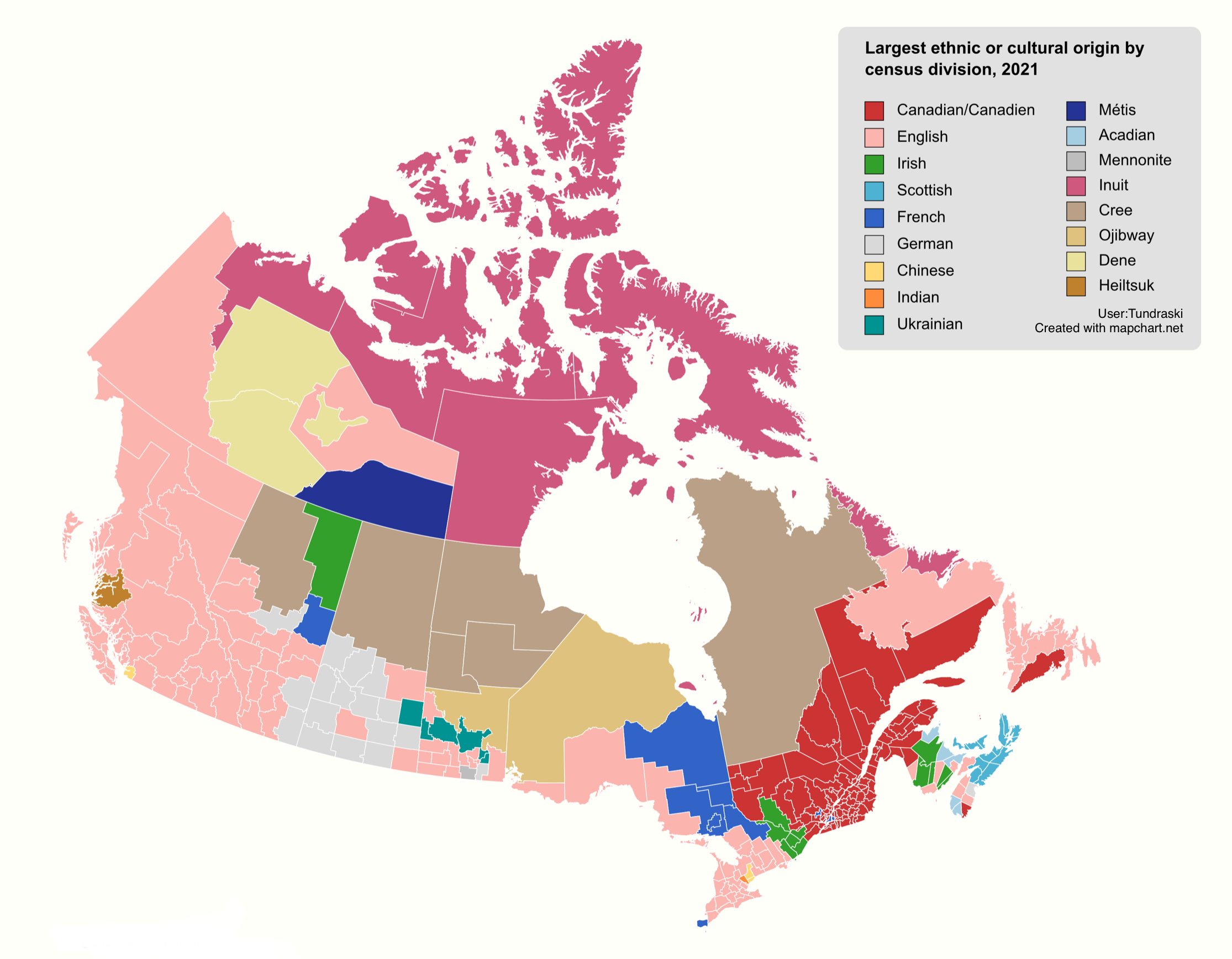
A map of the largest ethnic ancestry in different regions of Canada in 2021

Canada counted people by ethnic origin in 1765 and again from at least 1871 to 2006, with the exception of 1891. The options for ethnicity in the 2006 Canadian census were various kinds of European Canadian, Aboriginal Canadian, and various non-white or non-European groups known officially as "visible minorities". The 2011 Canadian census did not ask about race and ethnicity, but the new voluntary National Household Survey (NHS) for that year did ask about race and ethnicity (as well as many other questions that were previously asked on the Canadian census). Prior to the 1981 Canadian census, respondents could only mark one ethnicity/ethnic ancestry, but the 1981 census and all future ones allowed multiple ethnicity responses. Canada also enumerated its population by place of birth from 1871 to the present day.

=== Costa Rica ===
Costa Rica asked a question on ethnic or racial ancestral origins in the 2022 census using multiple options including indigenous, Black or Afro-descendant, Mulatto, Chinese, Mestizo, white and other.

Previously Costa Rica enumerated people by ethnicity in 1927 and 1950.

=== Cuba ===
Cuba enumerated people by race since 1774 to the most recent official census in 2012.

=== Dominica ===
The people in Dominica were enumerated by ethnicity in 1960 and 1981.

=== Dominican Republic ===
The 2022 Dominican Republic Census asked people to choose from "black", "white", "indio", "mulato", "mestizo", "Asian", and "other". Previously people in the Dominican Republic had been enumerated by ethnicity in 1960.

=== Grenada ===
The people of Grenada were enumerated by ethnicity in 1960 and 1981.

=== Guatemala ===
Guatemala has enumerated people by ethnicity in 1950, 1964, 2002, and 2018.

=== Jamaica ===
The population of Jamaica was enumerated by ethnicity in 1960 and again from 1982 all the way up to the present day.

=== Mexico ===
Mexico enumerates people on whether or not they speak Spanish or indigenous languages. Mexico does not enumerate its population by race and ethnicity directly.

=== Panama ===
Panama has enumerated people by ethnicity from the 1970 census all the way up to its most recent census in 2010. People in the then-United States-controlled Panama Canal Zone were numerated by ethnicity in 1950 and 1960.

=== Puerto Rico ===
Puerto Rico enumerated people by race in its census since at least 1877 with the exception of the period from 1960 to 1990.

=== United States ===
The plurality (not majority) ethnic ancestry in each county in the United States of America

Before the U.S. acquired independence from Great Britain, many of the Thirteen Colonies conducted censuses of their own where they enumerated their populations by race. The United States as a whole enumerated people by race in every census since its first census in 1790. Part of the reason why the United States began counting people by race much sooner than many other countries was due to the Three Fifths Compromise, which determined the amount of representation that Southern states had based on how many slaves they had (slaves were counted as three-fifths of a person for representation purposes, and a new census every ten years was needed to enumerate the current slave population). Initially, the United States Census only counted Americans as either white or black, with blacks classified as either free or slaves until 1860 (slavery in the United States was abolished in 1865). Over time, the United States has also added some other racial categories as well. Asian and Native American categories were added in 1860. However, the first census to enumerate all Native Americans occurred in 1890. Before that point Native Americans living on reservations were not counted, and thus most Native Americans in the U.S. were not counted in census data before 1890. Between 1850 and 1870, and in 1890, 1910, and 1920, the U.S. Census Bureau also enumerated Mulattoes and sometimes other partially black groups (Quadroons and Octoroons) separately.

The U.S. Census Bureau counted Mexicans as a separate race in 1930 and tried to retroactively determine the number of Mexicans in the U.S. in 1910 and 1920 as well.

President Franklin D. Roosevelt promoted a "good neighbor" policy that sought better relations with Mexico. In 1935, a federal judge ruled that three Mexican immigrants were ineligible for citizenship because they were not white, as required by federal law. Mexico protested, and Roosevelt decided to circumvent the decision and make sure the federal government treated Hispanics as white. The State Department, the Census Bureau, the Labor Department, and other government agencies therefore made sure to uniformly classify people of Mexican descent as white. This policy encouraged the League of United Latin American Citizens in its quest to minimize discrimination by asserting their whiteness.

Hispanics were counted as whites in 1940, but for the first time ever, the U.S. made an attempt to measure the size of the Hispanic population that year. The U.S. resumed enumerating its Hispanic/Latino population in 1970, with Hispanics being enumerated in every U.S. census since then. The U.S. Census Bureau also began offering Hispanics several sub-group options from which they could identify themselves, such as Mexican, Puerto Rican, Cuban, et cetera (these Hispanic sub-group options have changed over time). The Other race category was added in 1950, and in 2000 multi-race responses were tabulated for the first time (instructions now explicitly inform respondents that they can choose multiple race boxes). Because multiracial respondents are now allowed, U.S. Census data since 2000 is not directly comparable with that of previous censuses. While people nowadays are enumerated by race based on self-identification, until 1950 their race on the census was mainly determined by their census enumerator. During this time multiracial people who were White and of another race were usually marked down as belonging to the other race due to the One drop rule. The instructions provided to enumerators endorsed this practice.

It is worth noting that some of the definitions of race in the United States changed over time. For instance, Indian Americans were previously marked as Hindu in 1920–1940, Other race in 1950–1960, and White in 1970 before being marked as Asian (Indian) since 1980. The U.S. census counted certain Asian ethnic groups separately since 1870, initially counting only Chinese and Japanese, but having other categories as well since 1910. It only began counting all people by ethnic ancestry since the 1980 census, though. In addition to a Hispanic/Latino ethnicity question that has appeared on the census short form since 1980 (based on the US Office of Management and Budget's official categories specified in 1977). In addition, at various times the Census Bureau has also used an ancestry question. Before 1970, Alaska and Hawaii had different choices for race on their censuses in contrast to the continental United States.

The United States has also used language as a way to classify people by race or ethnicity. From 1910 to 1940, the Census recorded the mother tongue of the foreign-born population and their children. In 1960 and 1970 the Census Bureau also used mother tongue to classify respondents by ethnicity, but the definition of mother tongue was not consistent. Since 1980, the Census Bureau has tabulated language spoken at home for people aged five or older.

The 2020 United States Census might allow Middle Easterners and North Africans to write in their ethnicity/race instead of merely marking them as White. Right now, and in the past, Arabs have been marked in the U.S. Census as White. This began in the early twentieth century when Arabs coming to the United States successfully petitioned to be marked as White in order to avoid entry quotas and have a greater chance of achieving success and avoiding discrimination.

The United States is one of the countries that uses racial and ethnic census data in order to create minority-majority districts, as is required by the 1965 Voting Rights Act. These districts were created in order to increase minority representation in the United States Congress following the end of legal segregation and racial discrimination in the Southern United States.

Since 1850, the United States enumerated its population by their country of birth of its population. The whole U.S. population was enumerated by country of birth between 1850 and 1930 and again from 1960 to the present day. Meanwhile, only the White population of the United States was enumerated by their country of birth in 1940 and 1950.

== Oceania ==
=== Australia ===
Australia enumerated its population by race between 1911 and 1966, by racial origin in 1971 and 1976, by ethnic origin in 1981, and by ancestry since 1986.

=== Fiji ===
The population of Fiji was enumerated by ethnicity from 1881 all the way up to Fiji's most recent census in 2007.

=== Nauru ===
The population of Nauru was enumerated by ethnicity between 1947 and 1977.

=== New Zealand ===
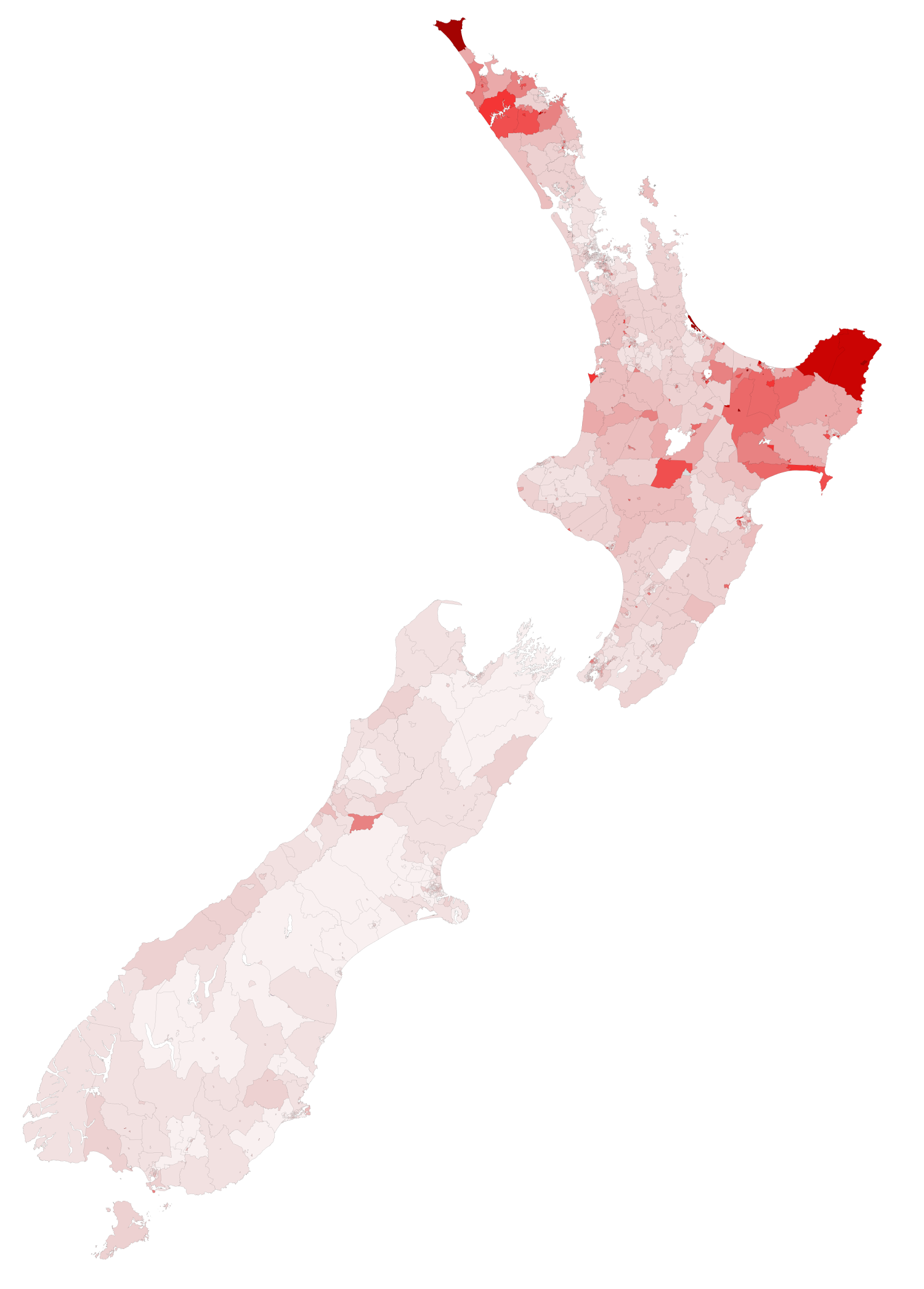
Maoris as a percentage of the total population of New Zealand in 2006

New Zealand enumerated people by ethnicity from 1858 to the present day. People were enumerated by tribal affiliation in 1901 and again from 1991 to the present day.

=== Palau ===
Palau enumerated people by ethnicity in 1995.

=== Papua New Guinea ===
Papua New Guinea only enumerated its population by ethnicity in 1971.

== South America ==
=== Argentina ===
Argentina enumerated its population by their country of birth from 1869 to the present day.

=== Bolivia ===
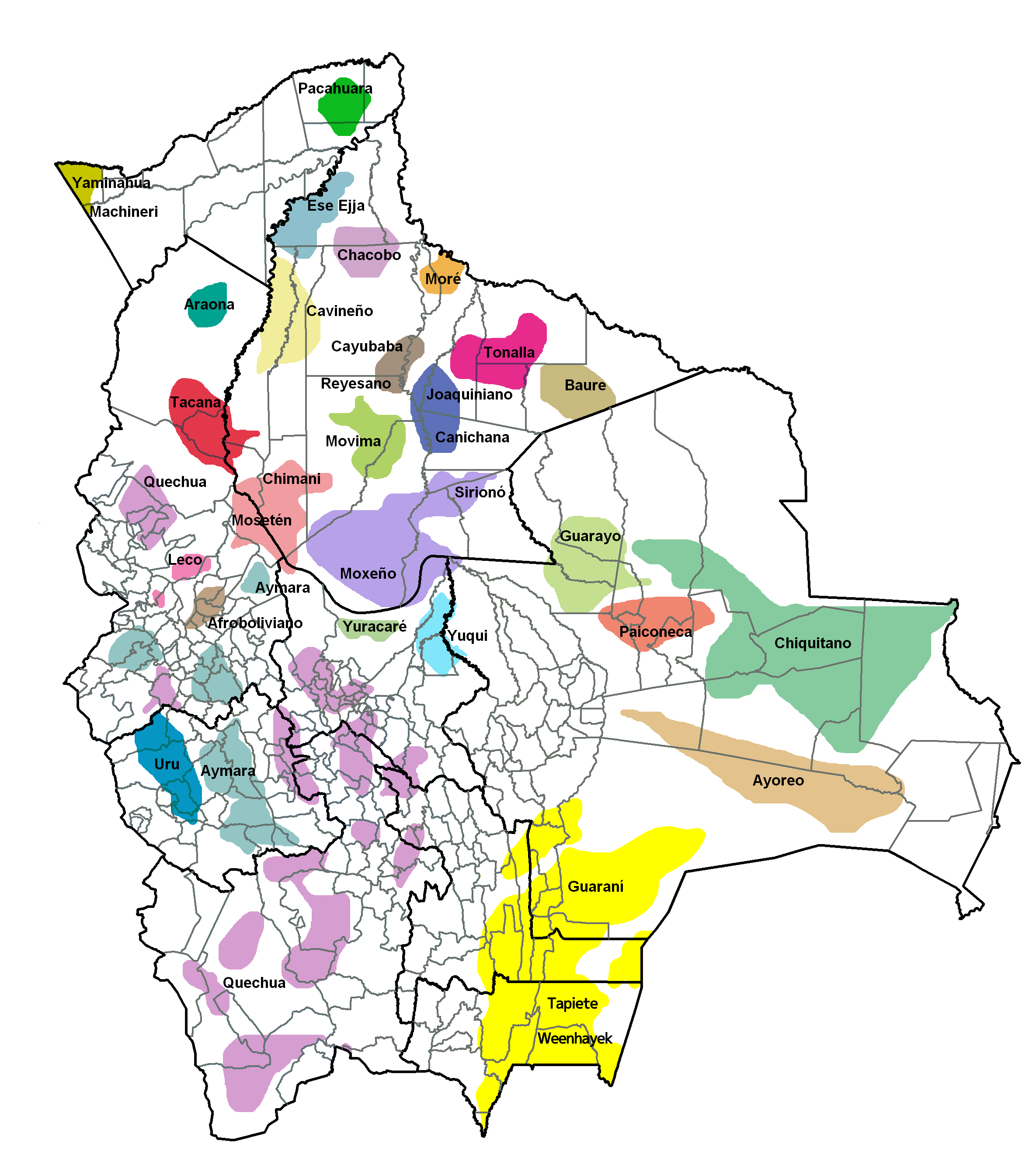
Ethnic composition of Bolivia

Bolivia enumerated people by ethnicity in 1950, 2001, and 2012. The 2012 census included 40 ethnic group options. However, it did not include Mestizo as an option, which critics of current Bolivian President Evo Morales say was because he wants more Bolivians to identify as one of the indigenous groups in order to lend more legitimacy to his indigenous-friendly policies.

Data from the census in 2012

Ethnic group	Total people	Male	Female
Afroboliviano	16.329	8.785	7.544
Araona	910	452	458
Aymara	1.191.352	592.817	598.535
Ayoreo	1.862	954	908
Baure	2.319	1.219	1.100
Canichana	617	360	257
Cavineño	2.005	1.118	887
Cayubaba	1.424	738	686
Chacobo	826	418	408
Chipaya	786	400	386
Chiquitano	87.885	45.497	42.388
Esse Ejja	695	379	316
Guaraní	58.990	29.918	29.072
Guarasugwe	42	25	17
Guarayo	13.621	6.846	6.775
Itonama	10.275	5.356	4.919
Joaquiniano	2.797	1.510	1.287
Kallawaya	7.389	3.824	3.565
Leco	9.006	4.820	4.186
Machinerí	38	25	13
Maropa	2.857	1.550	1.307
Mojeño	31.078	16.564	14.514
Moré	155	78	77
Mosetén	1.989	1.095	894
Movima	12.213	6.349	5.864
Murato	143	78	65
Pacahuara	161	85	76
Quechua	1.281.116	626.307	654.809
Sirionó	446	245	201
Tacana	11.173	6.060	5.113
Tapiete	99	59	40
Tsimane (Chimán)	6.464	3.399	3.065
Weenayek	3.322	1.686	1.636
Yaminahua	132	54	78
Yuki	202	102	100
Yuracaré	3.394	1.709	1.685
Yuracaré - Mojeño	292	171	121
other	42.188	19.861	22.327
Other not specified	4.419	2.333	2.086
Not belong	4.032.014	1.975.811	2.056.203

=== Brazil ===
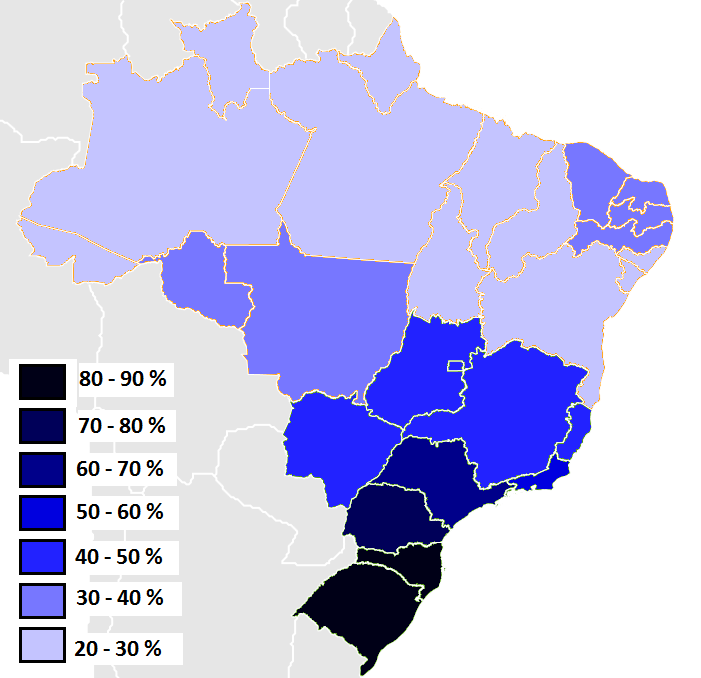
Brazilian states according to the percentage of Whites in 2009

The Brazilian census enumerated people by race in all censuses since 1872 with the exception of 1900, 1920, and 1970. The Brazilian census classifies people by race as either white, black, pardo (brown), yellow (Asian), or indigenous.

=== Chile ===
Chile enumerated people by ethnicity in 1992. The 2017 census included an option to identify as part of one of the country's indigenous groups.

=== Guyana ===
Guyana enumerated people by ethnicity from at least 1946 until at least 2002.

=== Peru ===
Peru collected data in the 1940 census. In the 2017 census, questions about culture and ancestors were asked in more detail for the first time for the population of 12 years old and above. Results were Mestizo 60.2%, Quechua 22.3%, White 5.9%, Afro-descendant 3.6%, Aymara 2.4%, Native or indigenous to the Amazon 0.3%, Asháninka 0.2%, Part of another Indigenous 0.2%, Aguaruna/Awajún 0.2%, Shipibo-Conibo/Konibo 0.1%, Japanese (Nikkei) 0.1%, Chinese (Tusan) 0.1%, Other 1.1%.

== See also ==
- Ancestry
- Census
- Demography
- Historical racial and ethnic demographics of the United States
- IBM and the Holocaust
- Majority minority
- Population and housing censuses by country
- Race and ethnicity in Brazil
- Race and ethnicity in the United States Census
- Visible minorities
- Languages in censuses
