= Hasib =

Hasib may refer to:

- Hasib (name)
- Names of God in Islam
