= Dirsekli, İdil =

Village in Şırnak Province, Turkey

Dirsekli
- Village
- Location within Turkey
- Coordinates: 37.352°N 41.866°E
- Country: Turkey
- Province: Şırnak
- District: İdil
- Population (2021): 575
- Time zone: UTC+3 (TRT)

Dirsekli (Kurdish: Xirabê Şeref; Syriac: Ḫarābī Šaraf) is a village in the İdil District of Şırnak Province in Turkey. The village is populated by Kurds of the Meman tribe and had a population of 575 in 2021.

== History ==
Ḫarābī Šaraf (today called Dirsekli) was historically inhabited by Syriac Orthodox Christians. In the Syriac Orthodox patriarchal register of dues of 1870, it was recorded that the village had one household, who did not pay their dues, and it did not have a church or a priest.

== Notable people ==
- Hasip Kaplan (b. 1954), Kurdish lawyer

== Bibliography ==
- Baz, Ibrahim (2016). Şırnak aşiretleri ve kültürü (in Turkish). ISBN 9786058849631.
- Bcheiry, Iskandar (2009). The Syriac Orthodox Patriarchal Register of Dues of 1870: An Unpublished Historical Document from the Late Ottoman Period. Gorgias Press.
