= Hasib Nimr =

Lebanese writer

- Born: Lebanon
- Occupations: Writer and poet

Hasib Nimr (Arabic:حسيب نمر) (born in Sheikhan, Lebanon) is a Lebanese writer and poet.

== Early life and education ==
Nimr received his primary education from his father. He then moved with his family to the city of Homs in Syria. From there, he moved to the capital, Damascus, where he finished secondary school. He relied on himself to study the Lebanese and French baccalaureate program, then joined the Jesuit University in the Lebanese capital Beirut, combining it with studying law in Damascus, and then studied Russian and English.

== Career ==
Hasib Nimr began his legal career when he worked in the office of Emile Lahoud, and also taught the Russian language at the House of the Association for Cultural Relations between the Soviet Union and Foreign Countries. He worked in education for a period of time, during which he was interested in teaching Arabic literature and the French language in a number of institutes in Lebanon and Syria, including the Institute of the Marian Brothers, the College of the Three Moons in Beirut, and the Homs Orthodox College. Hasib Nimr was the editor-in-chief of Al-Haq magazine, the head the Lebanese Democratic Jurists League, the secretary of the International Democratic Jurists Organization, and was a consultative member of the United Nations. Hasib Nimr took an interest in poetry, especially the poetry of the revolution. His poems were replete with the vocabulary of liberation, justice, peace and revolution. He takes national occasions as a starting point for declaring his principles and denouncing the enemies of the homeland and the nation. He dedicated to the poet Muhammad Mahdi Al-Jawahiri one of his long books that reveal his orientations. He used metered rhyme in all of his poems.

== Publications ==
- "Peace Revolution", An-Najah Press, Beirut, 1953.
- "Rebellious Hearts for Peace" and "Poetry Poems" (a volume of more than 200 poems)
- "To My Baby Zeina"
- "The Foundations of the Lebanese Sectarian Entity", Al-Kateb Publishers
- "Days in Vietnam"
- "The Role of Jurists in Developing the Law"
- "Capitalism Is Crumbling", Dar Samar

=== Translated works ===
- "Cesar Pavez" by Georges Perroy, House of the Arab Institute for Studies and Publishing
- "Buddha" by Henry Argonne
- "Cervantes" by Pierre Guenon
- "La Mallarmé" by Charles Moron
- "Praise of Madness to Erasmus"

=== Manuscripts ===
- "The Causes of the Lebanese Revolution"
- "In the History of Lebanon File"
- "A Treatise on Marxism-Leninism"
