= Hasip Kaplan =

Kurdish politician (born 1954)

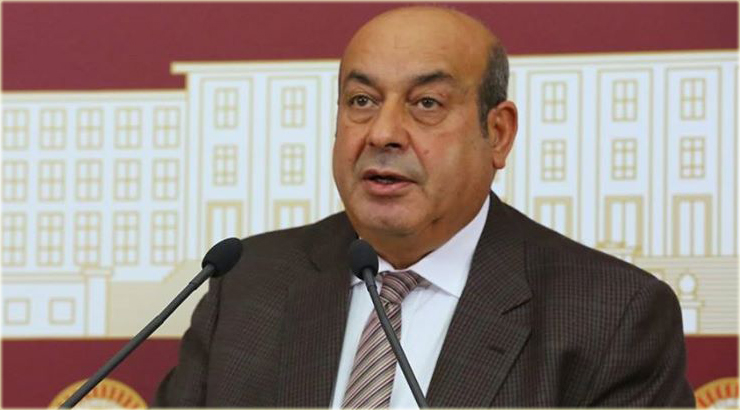

Member of the Grand National Assembly
- In office 2007–2015
- Constituency: Şırnak (2007, 2011)

Personal details
- Born: 1 January 1954 (age 72) İdil, Turkey
- Party: Democratic Society Party
- Other political affiliations: Peoples' Democratic Party
- Education: Istanbul University
- Occupation: Lawyer

Hasip Kaplan (born 1 January 1954, Dirkseli, İdil, Turkey) a Kurdish lawyer and politician; former member of the Grand National Assembly of Turkey for several parties, in 2015 he represented the Peoples Democratic Party (HDP) in the Turkish Parliament.

== Education and professional career ==
He graduated from the faculty of law from the Istanbul University and following was a lawyer. He taught international law for the training center of the Istanbul Bar Association. He was one of the lawyers who represented Abdullah Öcalan in his trial on Imrali island in 1999 and also his appeal before the European Court of Human Rights (ECHR) in 2003. Between 1994 and 2002, he represented the politicians of the banned Democracy Party (DEP) before ECHR, namely Ahmet Türk, Leyla Zana, Orhan Dogan, Hatip Dicle and others. In the verdict of this trial, the court reasoned that there was a violation of the European Convention on Human Rights and Turkey was ordered to pay each of the applicants of the case a remuneration. He also represented the Freedom and Democracy Party (ÖZDEP) in their appeal to the ECHR against their closure by the Turkish Constitutional Court.

== Political career ==
He was a member of the Democratic Society Party for which he acted as a Vice President. He was elected to the Turkish parliament as an independent representing Sirnak in the parliamentarian election of 2007. Later he rejoined the Democratic Society Party (DTP). Kaplan then joined the Peace and Democracy Party (BDP). In the parliamentary elections of 2011 he was re-elected as an independent for Sirnak. He was re-elected to the Turkish Parliament in June 2015. He resigned from the party and the Turkish parliament as well as politics in general in January 2018 following a controversy over a tweet in which he demanded that Turks should not seek Chairmanship of the HDP in the upcoming party congress.

== Political positions ==
=== Secularism ===
As a member of the DTP, he supported the secularism, alleging that if the DTP was absent from the Turkish politics, the islamic Sharia law would dominate in South Eastern Turkey.

=== Kurds ===
Kaplan demanded more cultural rights for the Kurds. In 2010 he opposed the action plan against separatist activities by the Council of Higher Education, alleging the plan would be used to prosecute and observe students attending Newroz celebrations or in the Kurdish language classes. As in January 2018 the Turkish Armed Forces invaded Syria and occupied Afrin he opposed the military operation.

=== Justice and human rights ===
Being an MP for the DTP and on reports that thousands of telephone conversations were surveilled due to their relation to the DTP, he demanded explications from the Minister of Justice Mehmet Ali Şahin and asked if the surveillance was done in due process. Following the closure of the DTP in December 2009, he was one of the plaintiffs in the DTPs appeal to the European Court of Human Rights (ECHR). As Selahattin Demirtas was tried in 2017, he criticized the Turkish authorities for trying Demirtas in absentia while he is in prison in Edirne.

=== In exile in Germany ===
In July 2021, the German Authorities informed him that he was on an execution list of 55 critics of the Turkish Government.

== Legal prosecution ==
He was prosecuted attacking the personal rights of Prime Minister Recep Tayyip Erdogan and sentenced to pay a fine equivalent of 3000€. He blamed the verdict on the political situation as he was sued by the prime minister, judged by a member of the YARSAV (Workers Union of Prosecutors and Judges) and his lawyer in the case was a member of the BDP. He was also prosecuted for having been the editor-in-chief for one day for the newspaper Ozgür Gündem, but the investigation was dropped in June 2016.

== Personal life ==
He is married and is the father of two children.
