= Haseeb Shehada =

Haseeb Shehadeh (Hebrew: חסיב שחאדה; Arabic: حسيب شحادة) is an Israeli Christian Arab scholar and professor, born in 1944 in the village of Kufr Yasif in the Galilee.

== Biography ==
He studied and received his education at the Hebrew University in Jerusalem, and then he achieved a PhD and became a professor of Semitic languages and an expert in Hebrew and Arabic languages at the University of Helsinki in Finland.

== Awards ==
In November 2011, Dr. Haseeb was awarded with the "Samaritan Chancellor’s Medal for Humanitarian Achievement and Services for Peace" by the "Samaritan Medal Foundation" in the West Bank for his researches in the Samaritan studies.
