= Kurdish Political Movement in Turkey =

Name	Short	Leader	Active
People's Labor Party	HEP	Ahmet Fehmi Işıklar	1990–1993
Freedom and Equality Party	ÖZEP		1992
Freedom and Democracy Party	ÖZDEP	Mevlüt İlik	1992–1993
Democracy Party	DEP	Yaşar Kaya	1993–1994
People's Democracy Party	HADEP	Murat Bozlak	1994–2003
Democratic People's Party	DEHAP	Tuncer Bakırhan	1997–2005
Democratic Society Movement	DTH	Leyla Zana	2005
Democratic Society Party	DTP	Ahmet Türk	2005–2009
Peace and Democracy Party	BDP	Gültan Kışanak, Selahattin Demirtaş	2008–2014
Peoples' Democratic Party	HDP	Sultan Özcan, Cahit Kırkazak	2012–2023
Democratic Regions Party	DBP	Çiğdem Kılıçgün Uçar, Keskin Bayındır	2014–present
Green Left Party	YSGP	Ahmet Asena Didem Betül Göçer	2023–present
People's Equality and Democracy Party	DEM	Tülay Hatimoğulları, Tuncer Bakırhan	2023–present

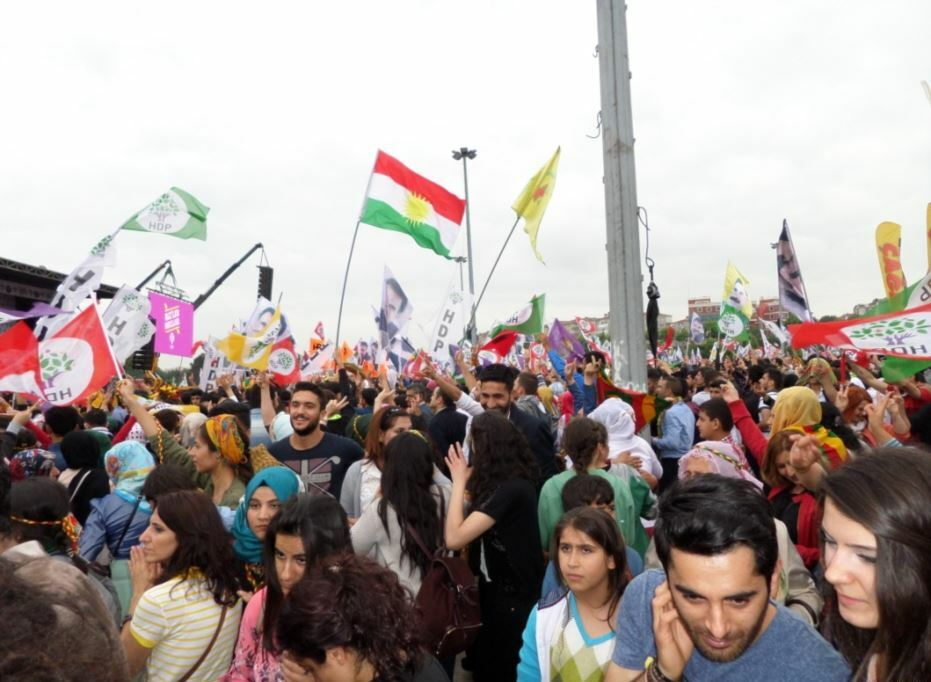
HDP supporters celebrating their election result in Istanbul, 8 June 2015

The Kurdish Political Movement or the Kurdish Liberation Movement, refers to the movement that seeks to realize the political demands of Kurdish people living in the geocultural region called Kurdistan in the lands of Turkey, Iraq, Syria, and Iran, such as education in their native language, self-determination, autonomy or an independent state. In the context of Turkey, this movement is being pursued by democratic means through left-wing ethnic political parties, as well as through PKK affiliated militant groups.

After the switch to Turkey's multi-party era in 1945, several Kurdish ethnic parties have been established. The first Kurdish minority interests party came into the political arena in 1990 with the establishment of the People's Labour Party (HEP), which was banned by the court in 1993 for being a source of separatism. Parties that advocate for Kurdish interests have since been ephemeral, often participating in one or two elections before being banned by the Constitutional Court, only to re-organize under another political party. This was also a recurring theme within the HEP tradition.

The Kurdish-interests movement in Turkey's political arena has been controversial, with many condemning the movement as a pathway for separatism and platform for pro-PKK ideologues. While the PKK does not have a structural relationship or hierarchical control over parties like the People's Democratic Party, HDP, they have aligning political visions, interpersonal and familial ties, and a shared experience of political repression. On the other hand, these ties have heavily fostered the discourse that Kurdish-interest parties "carry terrorists into the parliament" and has influenced not only the legitimacy of these parties but has also shaped the campaigning and electoral behaviors of other actors.

Another systematic struggle the Kurdish political movement used to face was the 10% electoral threshold. Minority Rights International, a U.K.-based non governmental organization, has stated that the 10% threshold prevents minority parties’ representation in the political arena. Their 2007 report highlights the fact that while pro-Kurdish parties have consistently acquired the highest percentage of votes in areas the Kurdish population is concentrated in, they have failed to reach the national 10% threshold. Since 2015, Kurdish-interest parties, starting with the HDP, have been able to poll above the threshold in general elections by successfully courting Turkish leftists. In 2022, this threshold was lowered to 7%.

== HEP tradition ==
=== People's Labor Party (HEP) ===
On 7 June 1990, seven members of the Grand National Assembly of Turkey who were expelled from the Social Democratic People's Party (SHP), together formed the People's Labor Party (HEP) and were led by Ahmet Fehmi Işıklar. The Party was banned in July 1993 by the Constitutional Court of Turkey for promoting separatism. The party paved the way for many successors which had a nearly identical ideology, mainly liberalism and radical democracy. The first successor was the Democracy Party, which was founded in May 1993. The Democracy Party was banned on 16 June 1994 for promoting Kurdish nationalism and four of the party's members: Leyla Zana, Hatip Dicle, Orhan Doğan and Selim Sadak were sentenced to 14 years in prison. Zana was the first Kurdish woman to be elected into parliament. However, she sparked a major controversy by saying, during her inauguration into parliament, "I take this oath for the brotherhood between the Turkish people and the Kurdish people." In June 2004, after spending 10 years in jail, a Turkish court ordered the release of all four prisoners.

=== People's Democracy Party (HADEP) ===
In May 1994, Kurdish lawyer Murat Bozlak formed the People's Democracy Party (HADEP), which won 1,171,623 votes, or 4.17% of the national vote during the general elections on 24 December 1995 and 1,482,196 votes or 4.75% in the elections on 18 April 1999, but it failed to win any seats due to the 10% threshold. During local elections in 1999 they won control over 37 municipalities and gained representation in 47 cities and hundreds of districts. In 2002, the party became a member of Socialist International. After surviving a closure case in 1999, HADEP was finally banned on 13 March 2003 on the grounds that it had become a "centre of illegal activities which included aiding and abetting the PKK". The European Court of Human Rights ruled in 2010 that the ban violated article 11 of the European Convention on Human Rights which guarantees freedom of association.

=== Democratic People's Party (DEHAP) and Democratic Society Movement (DTH) ===
The Democratic People's Party (DEHAP) was formed on 24 October 1997 and succeeded HADEP. DEHAP won 1,955,298 votes or 6,23% during the November 3, 2002 general election. However, it performed disappointingly during the March 28, 2004 local elections, where their coalition with the SHP and the Freedom and Solidarity Party (ÖDP) only managed to win 5.1% of the vote, only winning in Batman, Hakkâri, Diyarbakır and Şırnak Provinces, the majority of Kurdish voters voting for the AKP. After being released in 2004 Leyla Zana formed the Democratic Society Movement (DTH), which merged with the DEHAP into the Democratic Society Party (DTP) in 2005 under the leadership of Ahmet Türk.

=== Democratic Society Party (DTP) ===
The Democratic Society Party decided to run their candidates as independent candidates during the June 22, 2007 general elections, to get around the 10% threshold rule. Independents won 1,822,253 votes or 5.2% during the elections, resulting in a total of 27 seats, 23 of which went to the DTP. The party performed well during the March 29, 2009 local elections, however, winning 2,116,684 votes or 5.41% and doubling the number of governors from four to eight and increasing the number of mayors from 32 to 51. For the first time they won a majority in the southeast and, aside from the Batman, Hakkâri, Diyarbakır and Şırnak provinces which DEHAP had won in 2004, the DTP managed to win Van, Siirt and Iğdır Provinces from the AKP. On 11 December 2009, the Constitutional Court of Turkey voted to ban the DTP, ruling that the party had links to the PKK just like in case of previous closed Kurdish parties and authorities claimed that it is seen as guilty of spreading "terrorist propaganda". Chairman Ahmet Türk and legislator Aysel Tuğluk were expelled from Parliament, and they and 35 other party members were banned from joining any political party for five years. The European Union released a statement, expressing concern over the court's ruling and urging Turkey to change its policies towards political parties. Major protests erupted throughout Kurdish communities in Turkey in response to the ban.

=== Peace and Democracy Party (BDP) ===
The DTP was succeeded by the Peace and Democracy Party (BDP), under the leadership of Selahattin Demirtaş. The BDP called on its supporters to boycott the Turkish constitutional referendum on 12 September 2010 because the constitutional change did not meet minority demands. Gültan Kışanak, the BDP co-chair, released a statement saying that "we will not vote against the amendment and prolong the life of the current fascist constitution. Nor will we vote in favour of the amendments and support a new fascist constitution." Due to the boycott Hakkâri (9.05%), Şırnak (22.5%), Diyarbakır (34.8%), Batman (40.62%), Mardin (43.0%), Van (43.61), Siirt (50.88%), Iğdır (51.09%), Muş (54.09%), Ağrı (56.42%), Tunceli (67.22%), Şanlıurfa (68.43%), Kars (68.55%), and Bitlis Province (70.01%) had the lowest turnouts in the country, compared to a 73.71% national average. Tunceli was the only Kurdish majority province where a majority of the population voted "no" during the referendum. During the June 12, 2011 national elections, BDP came up with a new strategy to tackle the 10% issue, which brings the question of free representation by requiring that parties need 10% of the vote to be represented in parliament, and formally joined forces with the left, green, and various minority groups to run joint independent candidates, naming this electoral alliance the Labour, Democracy and Freedom Bloc. The BDP nominated 61 independent candidates, winning 2,819,917 votes or 6.57% and increasing its number of seats from 20 to 36. The BDP won the most support in Şırnak (72.87%), Hakkâri (70.87%), Diyarbakır (62.08%) and Mardin (62.08%) Provinces.

=== Peoples' Democratic Party (HDP) ===
Right after the 2011 Elections in July, in October 2011 the members of the alliance formed the Peoples' Democratic Congress (HDK). Peoples' Democratic Party (HDP) was formed out of the HDK with aims to be represented in parliament. In 2014, parliamentary members of the BDP joined HDP, and the BDP was renamed as Democratic Regions Party (DBP). Having separated from electoral politics, they began organizing for autonomous rule of the region, and a conflict between state security forces and organizers began which ended with almost all DBP officials being arrested. HDP since has been the current agent representing the Kurdish movement in the Turkish political arena, and it unites various political movements pertaining to an array of social minority groups and civil society organizations, which have previously mostly failed to be represented in parliament, to secure a stronger vote.

HDP's participated in its first election by nominating Selahattin Demirtaş for president, he received 9.77% of the vote, the best result for a Kurdish political party in Turkish history. In the June 2015 elections, HDP took a different direction and ran Kurdish nationalist candidates as party for the first time instead of using the strategy of running independent candidates to avoid falling under the ten per cent electoral threshold for political parties. By courting both Kurdish nationalists and Turkish leftists, the party received 13% of the vote, well above the 10% threshold, causing the AKP to lose its majority mandate for the first time since its creation. With coalition talks going nowhere in the hung parliament, the government called for another election for November that year, where HDP again polled above the threshold and unseated the ultra-nationalist MHP as the third largest party in parliament. In 2018, Kurdish MPs successfully ran under its banner again, and for a second time the party nominated Selahattin Demirtaş as its presidential candidate. In the 2019 local elections HDP did not run candidates in Ankara and Istanbul, instead endorsing CHP candidates Mansur Yavaş and Ekrem İmamoğlu, who subsequently won. In March 2021, a closure case was filed against the Peoples' Democratic Party (HDP), and political bans were requested for many HDP members. In September 2023, while the closure case against the party was ongoing, the HDP decided to transfer its political activities to the Peoples' Equality and Democracy Party (DEM).

=== People's Equality and Democracy Party (DEM) – current ===
In the lead up to the 2023 general election, the Constitutional Court charged the HDP with having links to the PKK. With a ban imminent, the Kurds competed under the banner of the Party of the Greens and the Left Future in an electoral alliance with the Workers' Party of Turkey (TİP) in the parliamentary election, and endorsed the CHP leader Kemal Kılıçdaroğlu for president. The party renamed itself to People's Equality and Democracy Party (DEM).

== Other traditions ==
=== Rights and Freedoms Party (HAK-PAR) ===
The Rights and Freedoms Party was founded in 2002 as an offshoot of DEHAP. It is also a successor of the Democracy and Peace Party (DBP) itself a DEP offshoot. The party is accused of having ties to the Socialist Party of Kurdistan (PSK).

=== Free Cause Party (HÜDA PAR) ===
The Free Cause Party was the first Kurdish political party in Turkey to take an Islamist turn rather than secular. It has ties to Kurdish Hezbollah. Lately, it supports president Recep Tayyip Erdoğan and joined the People's Alliance.

== Foreign policy ==
The Peoples' Democratic Party (HDP) and the Peoples' Equality and Democracy Party (DEM Party) both known for their pro-Kurdish stance in Turkey oppose the NATO enlargement process. The HDP abstained during the vote on Finland's NATO membership in March 2023, while the DEM Party both abstained and voted against Sweden's membership during the vote in January 2024.

== Election results ==
=== Grand National Assembly of Turkey ===
HEP tradition

Grand National Assembly
Election	Party	Popular Vote			Number of seats		Status	Map
Election	Party	Votes	%	± pp	Seats	+/–	Status	Map
1991	HEP (Note: Contested under SHP's banner)	753,806 (Note: The result of SHP in Adıyaman, Ağrı, Batman, Bingöl, Bitlis, Diyarbakır, Elazığ, Hakkâri, Kars, Mardin, Muş, Şanlıurfa, Siirt, Şırnak, Tunceli and Van)	3.09%	▲3.09 pp	21 / 550	▲21	Opposition	
1995	HADEP	1,171,623	4.16%	▲1.07 pp	0 / 550	▼21	Extra-parliamentary opposition	
1999	HADEP	1,482,196	4.83%	▲0.67 pp	0 / 550	Steady	Extra-parliamentary opposition	
1999	DBP	24,620	4.83%	▲0.67 pp	0 / 550	Steady	Extra-parliamentary opposition	
2002	DEHAP	1,960,660	6.21%	▲1.38 pp	0 / 550	Steady	Extra-parliamentary opposition	
2007	BUA (Note: The Thousand Hope Candidates were a slate of independent candidates endorsed by pro-Kurdish and leftist political parties)	1,334,518	3.81%	▼2.40 pp	22 / 550	▲22	Opposition	
2011	EDÖB (Note: The Labour, Democracy and Freedom Bloc were a slate of independent candidates endorsed by pro-Kurdish and leftist political parties)	2,435,133	5.67%	▲1.86 pp	36 / 550	▲14	Opposition	
June 2015	HDP	6,058,489	13.41%	▲7.74 pp	80 / 550	▲44	Opposition	
June 2015	HÜDA PAR	70,121	13.41%	▲7.74 pp	0 / 550	▲44	Opposition	
June 2015	HAK-PAR	58,716	13.41%	▲7.74 pp	0 / 550	▲44	Opposition	
November 2015	HDP	5,148,085	10.76%	▼2.42 pp	59 / 550	▼21	Opposition	
November 2015	HAK-PAR	108,583	10.76%	▼2.42 pp	0 / 550	▼21	Opposition	
2018	HDP	5,867,302	12.01%	▲1.02 pp	67 / 600	▲8	Opposition	
2018	HÜDA PAR	155,539	12.01%	▲1.02 pp	0 / 550	▲8	Opposition	
2023	YSGP (Note: Contested with Workers' Party of Turkey under Labour and Freedom Alliance. Parties in list included HDP, EMEP, and DBP)	4,800,607	8.97%	▼3.04 pp	61 / 600	▼6 (Note: Free Cause Party won 4 seats on the Justice and Development Party list.)	Opposition	
2023	HAK-PAR	42,509	8.97%	▼3.04 pp	0 / 550	▼6	Opposition	

=== Presidential elections ===
Presidential elections
Election date	Candidate	Votes	Percentage	Position	Map
2014	Selahattin Demirtaş	3,958,048	9.77	3rd	
2018	Selahattin Demirtaş	4,205,219	8.40	3rd	

=== Local elections ===
HEP tradition

Election date	Party	Popular Vote	Percentage	Municipalities		Councillors		Map
Election date	Party	Popular Vote	Percentage	Metropolitan	District	Municipal	Provincial	Map
1999	HADEP	1,094,761	3.48%	1 / 15	37 / 3,215			
1999	DBP	6,593	0.02%	0 / 15	1 / 3,215			
2004	DEHAP (Note: Contested with EMEP and ÖDP, under SHP's banner)	765,749 (Note: The result of SHP in Adıyaman, Ağrı, Batman, Bingöl, Bitlis, Diyarbakır, Elazığ, Hakkâri, Kars, Mardin, Muş, Şanlıurfa, Siirt, Şırnak, Tunceli and Van)	2.37%	1 / 16	56 / 3,215			
2009	DTP/BDP	2,277,813	5.70%	1 / 16	96 / 2,903	1,169 / 32,392		
2009	HAK-PAR	29,392	0.07%	0 / 16	0 / 2,903	0 / 32,392		
2014	BDP/HDP	2,611,127	6.29%	2 / 30	97 / 1,351	1,441 / 20,458	129 / 1,251	
2014	HÜDA PAR	87,726	0.21%	0 / 30	0 / 1,351	6 / 20,458	0 / 1,251	
2014	HAK-PAR	35,256	0.08%	0 / 30	1 / 1,351	6 / 20,458	0 / 1,251	
2019	HDP	2,409,485	5.60%	3 / 30	57 / 1,351	1,230 / 20,745	101 / 1,272	
2024	DEM	2,625,588	5.70%					
2024	HÜDA PAR	253,648	0.55%					
2024	HAK-PAR	31,633	0.07%					

== See also ==
- Turkeyification
- Democratic confederalism
- Kurdish political violence
- Syrian Democratic Forces
- Serhildan
- Yekbûn
- Civil Friday prayer
