= Ayşegül Doğan =

Turkish-Kurdish journalist (born 1977)

Ayşegül Doğan MP
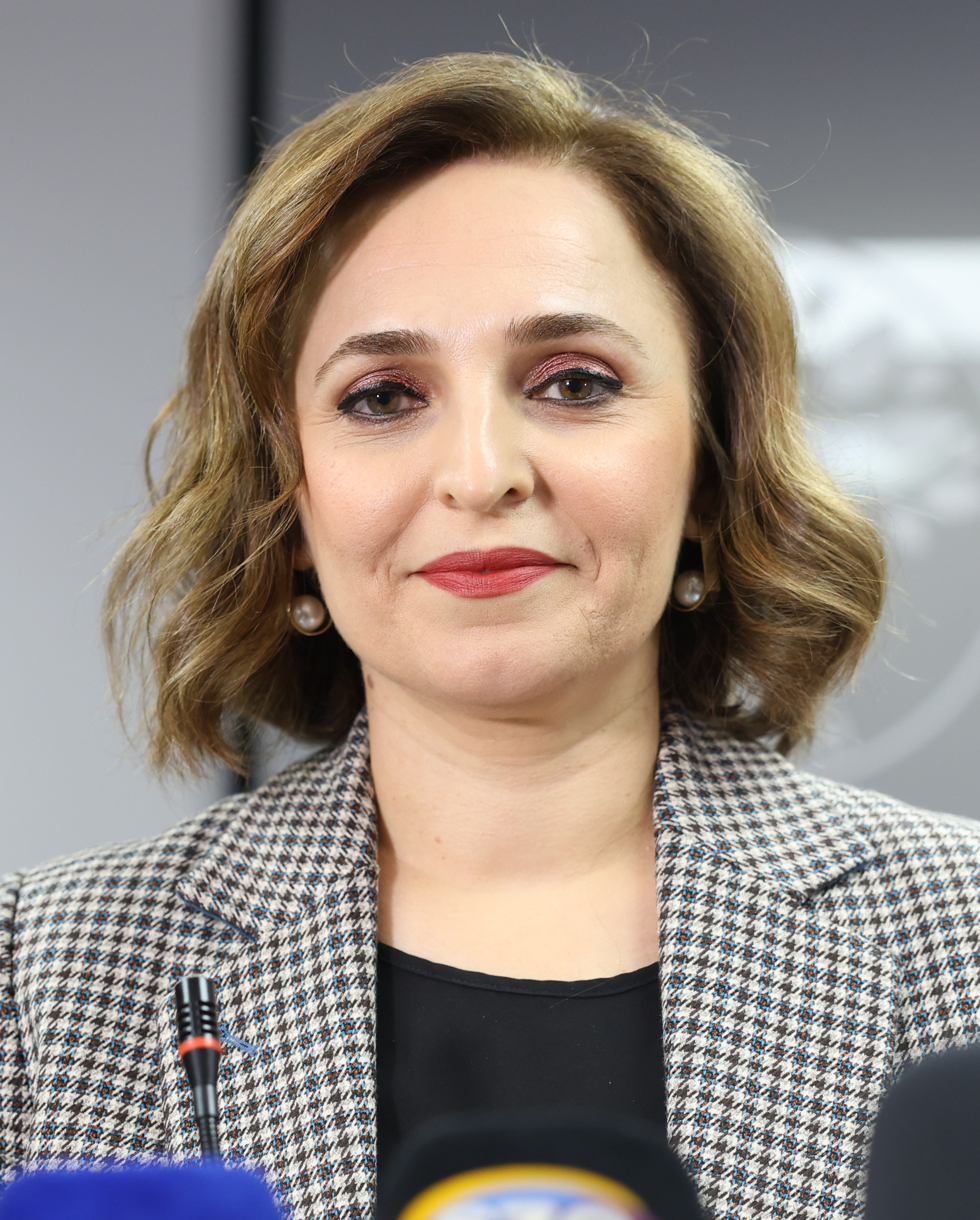

Member of the Grand National Assembly
- Incumbent
- Assumed office 2 June 2023
- Constituency: Şırnak (2023)

Personal details
- Born: 1977 (age 48–49) Ankara, Turkey
- Party: Green Left Party (YSP)
- Education: Communications
- Alma mater: University of Metz, France

Ayşegül Doğan (born 1977, Ankara, Turkey) is a Turkish and Kurdish journalist, politician and since June 2023 a member of the Grand National Assembly of Turkey representing Sirnak for the Green Left Party. She is also the daughter of the late Orhan Dogan.

== Early life and education ==
Doğan was born in Ankara in 1977 After having completed her primary and secondary education she traveled abroad to pursue to study communications at the University of Metz and the school of journalism in Paris between 1995 and 2000. In 1999, she made internships with the Agence France-Presse (AFP) office in Ankara and the French newspaper Courrier International in Paris.

== Professional career ==
Between 1999 and 2001 she was a lecturer for the Kurdish language at the Institut national des langues et civilisations orientales (INALCO) in Paris. Between 2001 and 2003 she a translator and journalist for the Turkish version of Le Monde Diplomatique. In 2011 onwards until 2016 she was the persenter of the program Gündem Müzakere for IMC TV. She also coordinated the programs of IMC TV until it was closed by decree in 2016.

=== Prosecution ===
Since May 2018 she is prosecuted for being a member of an armed organization due to her interviews she conducted with members of the Democratic Society Congress (DTK). The prosecution reasons the body was established on orders of Abdullah Öcalan and aims for "democratic autonomy". In December 2020 she was sentenced to 6 years 3 months in jail but remains free pending trial. The Committee to Protect Journalists condemned her trial.

== Political career ==
In the general elections in May 2023, she was elected to the Grand National Assembly of Turkey representing Şırnak for the YSP.
