= Fehmi Demir =

Turkish politician (1957–2015)

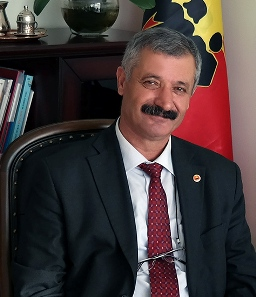

Leader of the Rights and Freedoms Party
- In office 26 October 2014 – 25 October 2015
- Preceded by: Kemal Burkay
- Succeeded by: Refik Karakoç

Personal details
- Born: 2 January 1957 Yeniceoba, Turkey
- Died: 25 October 2015 (aged 58) Tarsus, Mersin Province, Turkey
- Party: People's Labour Party (HEP) 1990-93); Democracy Party (1993-94); Democracy and Change Party (1994-95); Democracy and Peace Party (1996-2002); Rights and Freedoms Party (2002-15)
- Education: Eskişehir Academy of Economics and Commercial Sciences

Fehmi Demir (2 January 1957 – 25 October 2015) was a Turkish politician of Kurdish origin who served as the leader of the Rights and Freedoms Party (HAK-PAR) from October 2014 until his death a year later in October 2015. He advocated a federalist agenda, in favour of splitting Turkey into several federal states in order to give the Kurdish dominated regions more political autonomy.

On 25 October 2015, just six days before the November 2015 general election, Demir was killed in a traffic accident while travelling on a motorway through Tarsus in Mersin Province. His party had fielded candidates in 78 electoral districts for the election, while Demir had been the HAK-PAR's first-preference candidate in Diyarbakır.

== Early life and career ==
Fehmi Demir was born on 2 January 1957 in the Kurdish town of Yeniceoba (İncov) in the district of Cihanbeyli, Konya Province. He was the eldest of 6 children. He was educated at the Yeniceoba town school and completed his middle and high school education in Cihanbeyli. He graduated from the Eskişehir Commercial Sciences Academy Faculty of Economics, which would later become the Anadolu University. During his student years, he was active in pro-Kurdish university and political societies, also taking up roles in the Eskişehir Halkevleri.

== Political career ==
During the 1990s, Demir was active in pro-Kurdish political parties in Turkey. He was a founding member of the People's Labour Party (HEP) and was part of the party council. He was also a founding member of the Democracy Party (DEP) and became the party's Vice General Secretary. He later became a founding member of the Democracy and Change Party (DDP) and was the General Secretary until the party was closed down. He was part of the founding members of the Peace and Democracy Party (DBP) and served as the General Secretary of the DBP until the founding of the Rights and Freedoms Party, in which he served as Deputy Leader until he was elected as its Leader.

=== Leader of the Rights and Freedoms Party ===
The HAK-PAR held its 6th Ordinary Grand Congress on 26 October 2014, where 278 delegates cast their votes for a new leader to succeed Kemal Burkay. Demir won 164 votes against his rival Bayram Bozyel's 114, though the election was annulled since less than 50% of the registered delegates participated. However, after Bozyel withdrew from the race, Demir was automatically declared the leader.

As leader, Fehmi Demir led the HAK-PAR into a general election for the first time since the party was founded, contesting the June 2015 general election in 78 provinces. The party won just under 60,000 votes, well below the 10% election threshold necessary to win seats in Parliament. At the time of Demir's death, the party was campaigning for its second general election, due to be held on 1 November.

== Death ==
On 25 October 2015, Demir suffered a traffic accident on a motorway in Tarsus, Mersin Province, after his vehicle crashed into another car with an Austrian license plate that had broken down. Both Demir and Hacı Murat Doğu, the driver of the Austrian vehicle, were critically injured and later died at the scene. They were transferred to Tarsus State Hospital after the crash. His funeral took place in his hometown of Cihanbeyli, Konya Province and was attended by many pro-Kurdish political leaders including the Peoples' Democratic Party (HDP) co-leader Selahattin Demirtaş.
