= Human rights of Kurdish people in Turkey =

Overview of the rights of the Kurdish people in the Republic of Turkey

Kurds have had a long history of discrimination perpetrated against them by the Turkish government. Massacres have periodically occurred against the Kurds since the establishment of the Republic of Turkey in 1923. Among the most significant is the massacre that happened during the Dersim massacre, when 13,000–70,000 civilians were killed by the Turkish Army and 11,818 people were sent into exile. According to McDowall, 40,000 people were killed. The Zilan massacre of 1930 was a massacre of Kurdish residents of Turkey during the Ararat rebellion, in which 5,000 to 47,000 were killed.

The use of Kurdish language, dress, folklore, and names were banned, and the Kurdish-inhabited areas remained under martial law until 1946. In an attempt to deny an existence of a Kurdish ethnicity, the Turkish government categorized Kurds as "Mountain Turks" until the 1980s. The words "Kurds", "Kurdistan", and "Kurdish" were officially banned by the Turkish government. Following the military coup of 1980, the Kurdish language was officially prohibited in public and private life. Many people who spoke, published, or sang in Kurdish were arrested and imprisoned. But even though the ban on speaking in a non Turkish language was lifted in 1991, the Kurdish aim to be recognized as a distinct people than Turkish or to have Kurdish included as a language of instruction, but this was often classified as separatism or support of the Kurdistan Workers' Party (PKK). Currently, it is illegal to use the Kurdish language as an instruction language in private and public schools, yet there are schools who defy this ban. The Turkish Government has repeatedly blamed the ones who demanded more Kurdish cultural and educational freedom of terrorism or support for the Kurdistan Workers' Party (PKK).

During the Kurdish–Turkish conflict, food embargoes were placed on Kurdish populated villages and towns. There were many instances of Kurds being forcefully deported from their villages by Turkish security forces. Many villages were reportedly set on fire or destroyed. Throughout the 1990s and early 2000s, political parties that represented Kurdish interests were banned. In 2013, a ceasefire effectively ended the violence until June 2015, when hostilities renewed between the PKK and the Turkish government over the Rojava–Islamist conflict. Violence was widely reported against ordinary Kurdish citizens and the headquarters and branches of the pro-Kurdish rights Peoples' Democratic Party were attacked by mobs. The European Court of Human Rights and many other international human rights organizations have condemned Turkey for thousands of human rights abuses against Kurds. Many judgments are related to systematic executions of civilians, torture, forced displacements, destroyed villages, arbitrary arrests, and murdered and disappeared journalists, activists and politicians.

== Issues ==
=== Education ===
In Turkey, the only language of instruction in the education system is Turkish; Kurdish is not allowed as the primary language in the public education system. The Kurdish population of Turkey has long sought to have Kurdish included as a language of instruction in public schools as well as a subject. An experiment at running private Kurdish-language teaching schools was closed in 2004 because of the poor economic situation of local people. There are currently a number of unrecognized private schools giving education in Kurdish. As of 2008 education in Kurdish was de jure legal, but the requirements were very difficult to fulfill and therefore education in Kurdish was seldom accessible. People were often accused of supporting terrorism if they attempted to organize education in Kurdish language.

Kurdish is permitted as a subject in universities, but in reality there are only few pioneer courses.

=== Multiculturalism and assimilation ===
Due to the large number of Kurds in Turkey, successive governments have viewed the expression of a Kurdish identity through the prism of Turkish nationalism, as a potential threat to Turkish unity. One of the main accusations of cultural assimilation relates to the state's historic suppression of the Kurdish language. Kurdish publications created throughout the 1960s and 1970s were shut down under various legal pretexts. Following the Turkish military coup of 1980, the Kurdish language was officially prohibited in government institutions.

US Congressman Bob Filner spoke of a "cultural genocide", stressing that "a way of life known as Kurdish is disappearing at an alarming rate". Mark Levene suggests that the assimilation practices were not limited to cultural assimilation, and that the events of the late 19th century continued until 1990.

Desmond Fernandes and Tove Skutnabb-Kangas have claimed that Turkey instituted a genocide program (according to articles 2 (a) and 2 (e) of the UN Genocide Convention) against Kurds, which aimed at their assimilation. The genocide hypothesis is not endorsed by any nation or major organization. Desmond Fernandes, a senior lecturer at De Montfort University, breaks the policy of the Turkish authorities into the following categories:

1. Forced assimilation program, which involved, among other things, a ban of the Kurdish language, and the forced relocation of Kurds to non-Kurdish areas of Turkey.
2. The banning of any organizations opposed to category one.
3. The violent repression of any Kurdish resistance.

=== Cultural expression ===
Between 1983 and 1991, it was forbidden to publicize, publish and/or broadcast in any language other than Turkish, unless that language was the first official language of a country that Turkey has diplomatic relations with. Though this ban technically applied to any language, it had the largest effect on the Kurdish language, which is not the first official language of any country, despite being widely spoken in the Kurdistan region.

In June 2004, Turkey's public television TRT began broadcasting a half-hour Kurdish program, and on March 8, 2006, the Radio and Television Supreme Council (RTÜK) allowed two TV channels (Gün TV and Söz TV) and one radio channel (Medya FM) to have limited service in the Kurdish language. This legislation came into force as an effort to meet one of the European Union's requirements for membership in its talks with Turkey. The new regulation will allot five hours of weekly radio broadcast and four of television. In January 2009, the Turkish state broadcaster TRT launched its first fully Kurdish language channel: TRT Kurdî.

Despite these reforms, use of Kurdish in the public sphere and government institutions was still restricted until several years ago. On 14 June 2007, the Interior Ministry took a decision to remove Abdullah Demirbaş from his office as elected mayor of the Sur district of Diyarbakır. They also removed elected members of the municipal council. The high court endorsed the decision of the ministry and ruled that "giving information on various municipal services such as culture, art, environment, city cleaning and health in languages other than Turkish is against the Constitution".

This is despite the fact that according to the above-mentioned municipality, 72% of the people of the district use Kurdish in their daily lives. In another case, the mayor of Diyarbakır, Osman Baydemir, was subjected to a similar set of interrogations and judicial processes. His case is related to the use of the Kurdish phrase Sersala We Pîroz Be (Happy New Year) in the new year celebration cards issued by the municipality. The prosecutor wrote: "It was determined that the suspect used a Kurdish sentence in the celebration card, 'Sersala We Piroz Be' (Happy New Year). I, on behalf of the public, demand that he be punished under Article 222/1 of the Turkish Penal Code".

At present, these issues have been resolved for a while; the official website of the Municipality today is trilingual: Turkish, Kurdish and English.

=== Political representation ===
Banned Kurdish parties in Turkey
Party	Year banned
People's Labor Party (HEP)	1993
Freedom and Democracy Party (ÖZDEP)	1993
Democracy Party (DEP)	1994
People's Democracy Party (HADEP)	2003
Democratic Society Party (DTP)	2009

The Turkish Constitution bans the formation of political parties on an ethnic basis. Article 81 of the Political Party Law states that only Turkish is allowed to be used in the political activities of parties. Several Kurdish political parties have been shut down by the Turkish Constitutional Court under excuse of supporting the PKK. In 2012, the left-wing Kurdish Peoples' Democratic Party was founded and the party has continued to operate, gaining 50 seats in parliament after the November 2015 elections.

In Turkey, after 2014, political such as Kurdistan Democratic Party in Turkey (PDK-T), Kurdistan Socialist Party (PSK), Kurdistan Freedom Party (PAK) and the Kurdistan Communist Party (KKP) has been established. But, in 2019, the Chief Public Prosecutor's Office of the Supreme Court of Appeals has filed a closure case against the KKP, PAK, PSK and PDK-T because they have the word 'Kurdistan' in their names.

=== Internally displaced people (IDPs) ===
During the 1980s and 1990s, Turkey displaced a large number of its citizens from rural areas in south-eastern Anatolia by destroying thousands of villages and using forced displacement. The Turkish government claimed forced displacements were intended to protect the Kurds from the Kurdish militant organization Kurdistan Workers' Party (PKK). Although the Turkish security forces did not differentiate the armed militants from the civilian population they were supposed to be protecting. By the mid-1990s, more than 3,000 villages had been wiped from the map and according to official figures 378,335 Kurdish villagers had been displaced and left homeless.

=== Maps ===
In 2017, Turkey banned the terms "Kurdistan" and "Kurdish regions". In 2018, the government had a user-generated map of Kurdistan, which it deemed "terrorist propaganda", removed from Google Maps.

== History ==
Following the Young Turk Revolution at the beginning of the 20th century and the flowering of Turkish nationalism, the destruction or assimilation of minority populations (particularly Armenians, Assyrians, Greeks and Kurds) has been a recurring pattern. The 1934 Turkish Resettlement Law paved the way for forcible assimilation and resettlement.

== Selected incidents ==
=== Leyla Zana ===
In 1994, Leyla Zana—who, three years prior, had been the first Kurdish woman elected to the Turkish parliament—was sentenced to 15 years for "separatist speech". At her inauguration as an MP in 1991, she reportedly identified herself as a Kurd. She took the oath of loyalty in Turkish, as required by law, then added in Kurdish, "I have completed this formality under duress. I shall struggle so that the Kurdish and Turkish peoples may live together in a democratic framework." Parliament erupted with shouts of "Separatist", "Terrorist", and "Arrest her".

In April 2008, she was sentenced to two years in prison for allegedly "spreading terrorist propaganda" by saying in a speech, "Kurds have three leaders, namely Massoud Barzani, Jalal Talabani and Abdullah Ocalan." The last being the leader and founder of the PKK (Kurdistan Worker's Party).

=== Akin Birdal ===
In 2000, the chairman of the Turkish Human Rights Association Akin Birdal was imprisoned under Article 312 for a speech in which he called for "peace and understanding" between Kurds and Turks. He was forced to resign from his post, as the Law on Associations forbids persons who breach this and several other laws from serving as association officials.

=== Diyarbakır detentions (2006) ===
Violent disturbances took place in several cities in the southeast in March and April 2006. Over 550 people were detained as a result of these events, including over 200 children. The Diyarbakır Bar Association submitted more than 70 complaints of ill-treatment to the authorities. Investigations were launched into 39 of these claims. During the events in Diyarbakır, forensic examinations of detained were carried out in places of detention. According to the report of the commission, "this contravenes the rules and the circulars issued by the Ministries of Justice and Health as well as the independence of the medical profession". The commission also believes that "the new provisions introduced in June 2006 to amend the anti-terror law could undermine the fight against torture and ill-treatment". The commission also stresses that "a return to normality in Southeast can only be achieved be opening dialogue with local counterparts". "A comprehensive strategy should be pursued to achieve the socio-economic development of the region and the establishment of conditions for the Kurdish population to enjoy full rights and freedoms. Issues that need to be addressed include the return of internally displaced persons, compensation for losses incurred by victims of terrorism, landmines as well as the issue of village guards".

=== Istanbul banning of Kurdish-language play ===
In October 2020, the governor of Istanbul banned the Kurdish-language play Beru shortly before its first performance in the city. It had been performed three years prior both in Turkey and also abroad without issue.

== Current status ==
In 2009, the state-run broadcaster, TRT, launched a channel (TRT 6) in the Kurdish language.

The Turkey 2006 Progress Report underscores that, according to the Law on Political Parties, the use of languages other than Turkish is illegal in political life. This was seen when Leyla Zana spoke Kurdish in her inauguration as an MP she was arrested in 1994 and charged with treason and membership in the armed Kurdistan Workers Party (PKK). Zana and the others were sentenced to 15 years in prison. Prior to this in 1992, the Kurd Institute in Istanbul was raided by police who arrested five people and confiscated books on Kurdish language, literature, and history.

The European Commission concludes as of 2006 that "overall Turkey made little progress on ensuring cultural diversity and promoting respect for and protection of minorities in accordance with international standards". The European Commission Against Racism and Intolerance (ECRI) reports that (as of April 2010): "The public use by officials of the Kurdish language lays them open to prosecution, and public defence by individuals of Kurdish or minority interests also frequently leads to prosecutions under the Criminal Code." From the 1994 briefing at the International Human Rights Law Group: "the problem in Turkey is the Constitution is against the Kurds and the apartheid constitution is very similar to it." The Economist also asserts that "reforms have slowed, prosecutions of writers for insulting Turkishness have continued, renewed fighting has broken out with Kurds and a new mood of nationalism has taken hold", but it is also stressed that "in the past four years the Turkish prime minister, Recep Tayyip Erdoğan, improved rights for Kurds".

128 attacks on HDP offices, a pro-Kurdish rights party, have occurred throughout the country.

== See also ==
- Denial of Kurds by Turkey
- Persecution of Kurds
- Racism in Turkey § Against Kurds
- Anti-Kurdish sentiment
