= Anzoulada =

Town of ancient Lycaonia

Coordinates: 38°20′21″N 33°04′31″E

Anzoulada was a town of ancient Lycaonia, inhabited in Byzantine times. The name does not occur among ancient authors but is inferred from epigraphic and other evidence.

Its site is tentatively located near Oğuzeli, Altınekin, Konya Province, Turkey.
