= Vedat Aydın =

Kurdish lawyer and politician (1953–1991)

- Born: 1953
- Died: 7 July 1991 (aged 37–38)
- Cause of death: Murder
- Body discovered: Maden, Elazığ
- Resting place: Diyarbakir
- Citizenship: Turkish
- Occupation: Lawyer
- Political party: HEP
- Spouse: Sükran Aydın

Vedat Aydın (1953 – 7 July 1991) was a Kurdish politician in Turkey and human rights defender. He was married to Sükran Aydın.

== Early life and education ==
He was born in 1953 in the village of Kazancı in Bismil District of Diyarbakir Province. He graduated from the Literary department of the Vocational School in Diyarbakir in 1979. He became a founding member and delegate of the Diyarbakir branch of the Turkish Human Rights Association (IHD).

== Kurdish rights activist ==
At the annual meeting of the IHD in October 1990, he gave the first public speech in Kurdish language in Turkey, which was forbidden. The decision to make the speech in Kurdish was taken by the Kurdish delegates, but caught others by surprise. Many other non-Kurdish delegates left the congress in protest while Aydin kept on with his speech, which was translated by Ahmet Zeki Okçuoglu into Turkish. Aydin was detained and arrested in Ulucanlar prison, Ankara. After his release he was elected the head of the People's Labor Party (HEP) in Diyarbakir.

=== Assassination ===
He was killed in July 1991. On 5 July, armed men identifying themselves as police officers showed up at his home and forced him into a car. On 7 July his body was found under a bridge just outside the boundaries of the province Diyarbakir, in the Maden district of the province of Elazıĝ. He was immediately buried at the Maden Municipality, but later an autopsy was done and after it was confirmed the body belonged to Aydın, he was reburied in Diyarbakir. His skull was fractured, his legs broken and about 15 bullets were shot in his body. 8 bullets were found in his body. No one was charged for the murder of Vedat Aydin. At his funeral in Diyarbakir on 10 July, the police fired live ammunition into a crowd of thousands of mourning people. The police claimed stones were thrown from within the crowd, eyewitnesses denied this, though. As a result, 7 to 13 people were killed and up to 100 people were injured. Protests against these events took place in the next days Diyarbakir, Nusaybin, Lice, Uludere and Bismil. Nobody was charged with the killing of the attendants of the funeral cortege. On 4 December 1993 a delegation of DEP parliamentarians came under an armed attack as they were on a mission in Batman trying to find out who killed Aydın. As a result, the MP for Mardin Mehmet Sincar and the local party leader of Batman were killed and MP for Batman Nizamettin Toğuç was injured together with three others. The investigation into the murder of Vedat Aydın went on, but in the year 2009, 18 years after his murder, a court in Malatya decided to close the investigation about the murder of Aydin and returned the file to Diyarbakir due to lack of jurisdiction.
