= Congustus =

Ancient Byzantine Empire town

Coordinates: 38°18′28″N 32°52′07″E

Congustus or Kongoustos (Ancient Greek: Κόγγουστος), also known as Congussus, was a town of ancient Lycaonia or of Galatia, inhabited in Roman and Byzantine times. The Tabula Peutingeriana has the place as Congusso.

Its site is located near Altınekin, Konya Province, Turkey.
