= Turkeyification =

Abdullah Öcalan's post-imprisonment philosophy

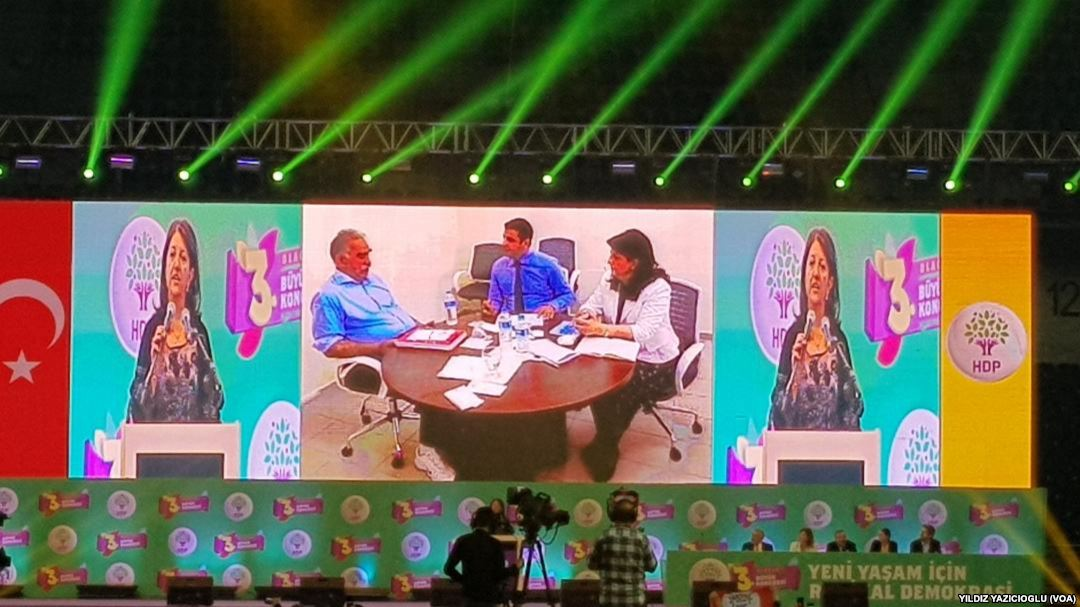
Symbolism of Turkeyification at an HDP congress, where the prominent display of the Turkish flag (left) alongside the party flag (right), a picture of Abdullah Öcalan, and the slogan "Yeni Yaşam İçin Radikal Demokrasi" (English: "Radical democracy for a new life") reflects the movement's shift away from Kurdish nationalism.

Turkeyification (Turkish: Türkiyeleşme or Türkiyelileşme) or Turkeyfication is a political concept referring to the process of becoming integrated into Turkey's political framework, developing loyalty to Turkey, or adopting a civic identity centered on Turkey. The term is particularly associated with the Kurdish political movement in Turkey, segments of the Turkish left, and the post-imprisonment political shift of Abdullah Öcalan. The pursuit of Turkeyification by Öcalan and pro-Kurdish parties has shifted the Kurdish issue from an ethnic conflict toward a question of democratization in Turkey, emphasizing the integration of Kurds into existing political structures. Critics argue that this approach represents a continuation of the Turkish state's long-standing policy of Turkification.

== Turkeyification in Kurdish politics ==
The first instances of Turkeyification in Kurdish politics in Turkey emerged in the 1990s with the creation of the People's Labour Party (HEP).

The Peoples' Democratic Party (HDP) was founded as part of "Abdullah Öcalan's Turkeyification project" and identifies it as a main strategy. As part of Turkeyification efforts, the HDP, and now the Peoples' Equality and Democracy Party (DEM Party), emphasize broader issues in Turkey beyond Kurdish minority rights, particularly democratization, encouraging a united Turkey and leading to their description as "all-Turkey parties." This may have helped ease long-standing fears of Kurdish separatism in Turkish society. However, after the collapse of the 2013–2015 peace process between the Kurdistan Workers' Party (PKK) and Turkey, the HDP was accused by the Turkish government of supporting those "against the Turkish nation" and not committing to a united Turkey.

== Research and criticism ==
In their book Kurdish Paradox of Statelessness: Öcalan’s Confederalism and Turkeyification Strategies, published in 2025, Kamal Soleimani, who received his Ph.D. in Islamic and Middle Eastern history from Columbia University, New York, and Behrooz Shojai, a researcher and lecturer at the Uppsala University, critique Öcalan's political shift, particularly his adoption of Turkeyification, arguing that, paradoxically, his new paradigm could lead to the assimilation of Kurds and Kurdish politics within the current framework of the Turkish political system without guaranteeing linguistic, cultural, or autonomy rights, while criticizing "sympathetic scholarship" on Öcalan's behalf, as well as calling on a comprehensive reassessment of "Öcalan's project." Soleimani and Shojai argue that an overlooked aspect of Öcalan's post-imprisonment politics is his policy of Turkeyification. They distinguish it from the Turkish state's earlier policy of Turkification, which aimed at the forced ethnic assimilation of non-Turks. While Turkeyification is presented as promoting loyalty to Turkey rather than ethnic Turkish identity, they argue that in practice it does not differ significantly from Turkification. They point out that Öcalan recognizes the legitimacy of the Turkish state, its borders, and its constitution, including Article 66, which defines all citizens as Turks. They also note that he has described the official recognition of the Kurdish language and the creation of a federal system as "dangers" or aspirations for a Kurdish nation-state as an "expression of a kind of capitalist distortion" and obsolete. At the same time, his hostility does not similarly extend to the existing Turkish state; in his own words, he is rather ready to "serve the Turkish state." For these reasons, they describe his policies as a form of voluntary Turkification.

Some politicians in the HDP criticized Turkeyification for becoming too conformist. Others also saw a problem for the party's support base. They warned that using more state-focused political language could weaken support from mainly Kurdish voters unless new ways of political expression were found.

A 2023 study by the Diyarbakır-based Kurdish Studies Center found that 42% of respondents supported the HDP's Turkeyification policy. In comparison, 20.9% opposed it and said the party should abandon it, while 37.1% said they had no opinion or were unfamiliar with the policy.
