= Feridun Yazar =

Kurdish Politician

Feridun Yazar (1944 – 12 June 2016) was the president of the political party HEP from 1991 to 1992. Yazar was born in Şanlıurfa and worked as an attorney. He was also involved in politics and was charged with being a member of the Revolutionary Cultural Eastern Hearths (DDKO). He was in prison until 1974 when he was granted an amnesty. He stayed in politics with the CHP. He was mayor of Şanlıurfa for the CHP in the years between 1977–80. He was dismissed as mayor after the military coup 1980 and arrested for two years. After his release he returned into politics with the SHP. He became provincial chair for Urfa in 1988 but resigned from the party due to the dismissals from fellow Kurdish MPs. He then became the President of the HEP. He later was sent again to prison for propagandizing against the indivisibility of the state in the year 1998. In the congress of the Peace and Democracy Party (BDP) of October 2015, he was elected into the parties academic political advisory board. On 1 November 2015 he was a candidate for MP for Şanlıurfa the HDP, but he was not elected. He died on 12 June 2016.
