= Altınekin =

- District and municipality
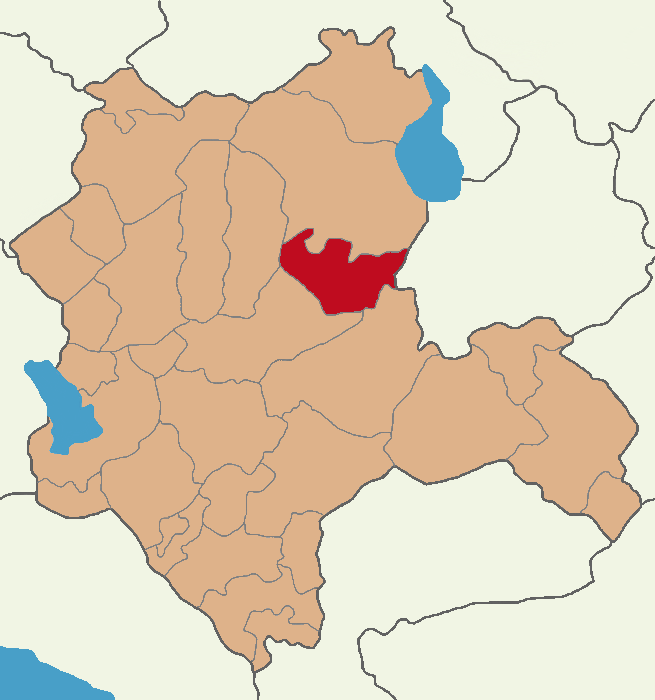
- Map showing Altınekin District in Konya Province

- Location within Turkey Location within Turkey Central Anatolia
- Coordinates: 38°18′28″N 32°52′07″E
- Country: Turkey
- Province: Konya

Government
  - Mayor: Fatih Orhan (AKP)
- Area: 1,312 km^{2} (507 sq mi)
- Elevation: 990 m (3,250 ft)
- Population (2022): 14,289
  - Density: 10.89/km^{2} (28.21/sq mi)
- Time zone: UTC+3 (TRT)
- Postal code: 42450
- Area code: 0332
- Climate: Csb
- Website: www.altinekin.bel.tr

Altınekin is a municipality and district of Konya Province, Turkey. Its area is 1,312 km^{2}, and its population is 14,289 (2022). Its original name was Zıvarık until the İnönü government changed its name in 1963, giving it the name of one of Zıvarık's plateaus, Altınekin ("golden crop"), named as such because of the land's fertility.

The town is near the ancient Roman city of Pegella.

During the medieval period under the Seljuk Turks, the town prospered as it lay on the Ankara–Konya trade route, the Seljuks building a caravanserai (known as the Zıvarık Han) in the 14th century, along with a wooden mosque. Both of these are in good condition today.

Crimean Tatar refugees from Bağçasaray, Crimea were settled in the town in the early 1900s. The town became known thereafter for its fertile sugar beet production.

After the proclamation of the republic in 1923, courthouses and other public institutions were built in the town. The town sent a member of parliament to the Grand National Assembly, Ali Fırat. The İnönü government of the 1960s, besides changing the town's name, also downgraded the town's status and made it a subdistrict of the neighboring Cihanbeyli, perhaps as retaliation against Fırat's opposition to İnönü's leftist government. The government also removed the public services and moved them to Cihanbeyli. This forced the townspeople to make the trek there for basic necessities like registering births and obtaining identification cards. The government also neglected the upkeep of the historical caravanserai and mosque in town. The new highways built under this and succeeding governments also modified the ancient Ankara–Konya trade route to bypass the town, depriving its economy of the trade's benefits.

Public services were not restored until the conservative government of Turgut Özal in the 1980s, the grateful town giving his name to the new Turgut Özal Park.

== Composition ==
There are 19 neighbourhoods in Altınekin District:

- Akçaşar
- Akıncılar
- Akköy
- Ayışığı
- Borukkuyu
- Dedeler
- Hacınuman
- Kale
- Karakaya
- Koçaş
- Koçyaka
- Mantar
- Oğuzeli
- Ölmez
- Sarnıçköy
- Topraklık
- Yenice
- Yenikuyu
- Yeniyayla
