= Kazancı, Bismil =

Village in Diyarbakır Province, Turkey

Kazancı
- Neighbourhood
- Location in Turkey
- Coordinates: 37.769°N 40.599°E
- Country: Turkey
- Province: Diyarbakır
- District: Bismil
- Population (2022): 1,309
- Time zone: UTC+3 (TRT)

Kazancı (also known as Kürdhacı, Kurdish: Heciya Kurda) is a neighbourhood in the municipality and district of Bismil, Diyarbakır Province in Turkey. The village is populated by Kurds and had a population of 1,309 in 2022.

== Notable people ==
- Vedat Aydın
