= Abdülmelik Fırat =

Turkish politician

Abdülmelik Fırat (1934, Hınıs – 29 September 2009, Ankara) was a prominent Turkish-Kurdish politician. He was the grandson of Sheikh Said, leader of the 1925 Sheikh Said rebellion.

== Early life and education ==
His grandfather Sheikh Said was a Sheikh of the Sufi Naqshbandi order, which had great influence in the Kurdish population in Turkey. Following the defeat of the rebellion led by Sheikh Said and the subsequent execution of him, his surviving relatives were exiled. Several returned in 1929, when the law allowed it. He was born in 1934 in Erzurum and attended school in Diyarbakir.

== Career ==
Fırat joined the Democrat Party (DP), and was elected to parliament in 1957. He was imprisoned after the 1960 Turkish coup d'état and was sentenced to death in the Yassıada trials, later commuted to imprisonment.

Fırat re-joined politics in 1991 with the True Path Party, and represented it in the Grand National Assembly of Turkey, but left the party in disagreement over its policies towards the Kurds. He remained in the assembly as an independent, losing his seat in the 1995 general elections. For some time, he held sympathies for the People's Democracy Party (HADEP) before in 2001 he established the Rights and Freedoms Party (Turkish: Hak ve Özgürlükler Partisi, HAK-PAR) 2001 in competition of it. He retired from politics on health grounds in 2006. He died in September 2009 in a hospital in Ankara, where he was treated for leukemia.

=== Political positions ===
Despite being a harsh critic of the Kurdistan Workers' Party (PKK), he was imprisoned for two months for aiding the PKK in 1996. Fırat said the PKK had been set up by the Turkish "deep state" and worked closely with the Turkish Gendarmerie's JITEM intelligence unit, and that leader Abdullah Öcalan had worked with the National Intelligence Organization before founding the PKK. In 2008, he also stated the pro-Kurdish Democratic Society Party (DTP) was founded by the PKK, and that 80 percent of Kurds do not vote for this party.

=== Publications ===
His book The Euphrates Flows Sadly was the issue of an investigation on separatist propaganda in 1996.
