= Berdan Öztürk =

Turkish politician (born 1980)

Berdan Öztürk MP
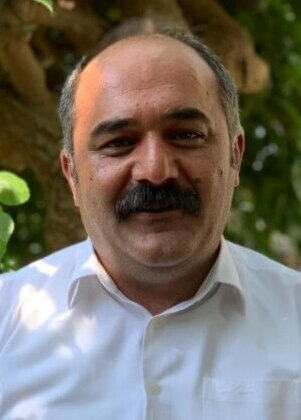

Member of the Grand National Assembly
- Incumbent
- Assumed office 7 June 2015
- Constituency: Ağrı (June 2015, Nov 2015, 2018); Diyarbakır (2023)

Co-Chair of the Democratic Society Congress
- Incumbent
- Assumed office September 2017 Serving with Leyla Güven

Personal details
- Born: 1 May 1980 (age 46) Tutak, Turkey
- Party: Peoples' Equality and Democracy Party (DEM Party) (2023-present)
- Other political affiliations: Peoples' Democratic Party (HDP) (2015-2023)
- Education: Marmara University
- Occupation: Politician

Berdan Öztürk (born 1 May 1980 in Tutak) is a Turkish politician of Kurdish descent who is from the Peoples' Democratic Party (HDP), who has served as a Member of Parliament for the electoral district of Ağrı since 7 June 2015.

== Early life and career ==
Öztürk graduated from Marmara University Faculty of Law. After a year in legal work experience, he pursued a master's degree in the University of London, specialising in International Arbitration and Commercial Law. He is a freelance lawyer since 2011 and is currently pursuing a Doctorate.

== Political career ==
In the June 2015 general election, Öztürk was elected as a Member of the Grand National Assembly of Turkey representing the Peoples' Democratic Party (HDP) for Ağrı. He was re-elected in the snap elections of November 2015 general elections, and the 2018 parliamentary elections. During the 8th congress of the Democratic Society Congress (DTK) on the 16 September 2017, he and Leyla Güven were elected its Co-Chairs.

== Prosecution ==
In 2016 an investigation was launched against Öztürk for participating in a funeral of five militants of the Kurdistan Workers' Party (PKK). He was acquitted in May 2018. Due to a statement concerning the Turkish invasion of north eastern Syria he is investigated for terrorist propaganda since 2019. The International Federation for Human Rights (FIDH) condemned his prosecution and demanded an explanation from the Turkish authorities. On 17 March 2021, the Turkish state prosecutor before the Court of Cassation Bekir Şahin filed a lawsuit before the Constitutional Court demanding for him and 686 other HDP politicians a five-year ban for political activities. The lawsuit was returned to the prosecutors office on 31 March, as the indictment did not meet the legal requirements.
