= Yeniceoba =

Municipality in Konya Province, Turkey

- Neighbourhood
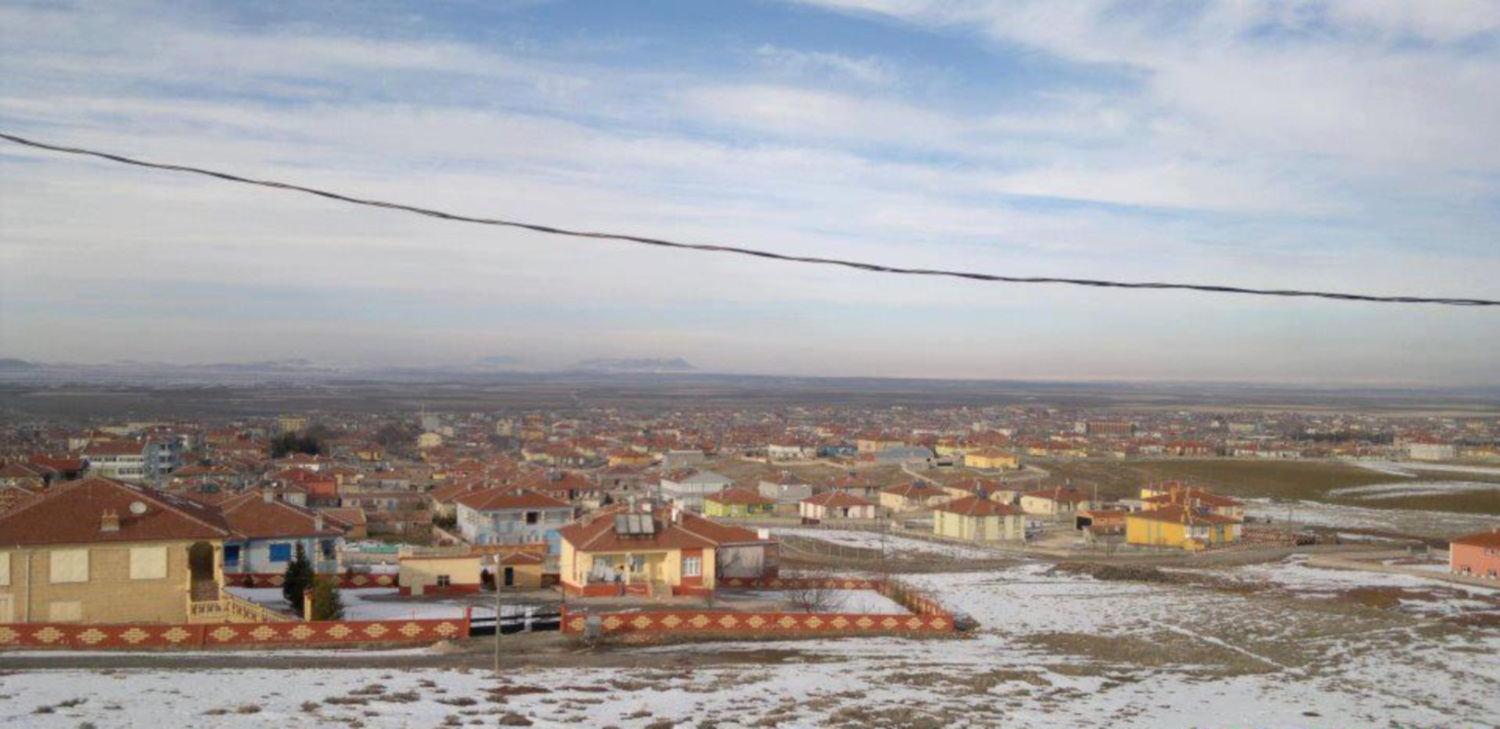

- Location within Turkey Location within Turkey Central Anatolia
- Coordinates: 38°52′15″N 32°47′31″E
- Country: Turkey
- Province: Konya
- District: Cihanbeyli
- Population (2022): 5,491
- Time zone: UTC+3 (TRT)

Yeniceoba (Kurdish: Încow) is a neighbourhood of the municipality and district of Cihanbeyli, Konya Province, Turkey. Its population is 5,491 (2022). Before the 2013 reorganisation, it was a town (belde). The highway distance from Yeniceoba to Konya is 130 km.

== Information ==
The town is populated by Kurds. About 5,000 people emigrated from the town to Denmark.

== Politics ==
=== Election results ===
==== 2007 general election ====
Party	Votes	%
Justice and Development Party	2,279	64.74
Republican People's Party	540	15.34
Thousand Hope Candidates	390	11.08
Nationalist Movement Party	107	3.04
Other	204	5.80
Total	3,520	100.00
Valid votes	3,520	97.70
Invalid/blank votes	83	2.30
Total votes	3,603	100.00
Registered voters/turnout	4,685	76.91
Source: YSK, YSK

==== 2011 general election ====
Party	Votes	%
Justice and Development Party	1,734	53.82
Democratic Society Party	775	24.05
Republican People's Party	404	12.54
Nationalist Movement Party	62	1.92
Other	247	7.67
Total	3,222	100.00
Valid votes	3,222	97.22
Invalid/blank votes	92	2.78
Total votes	3,314	100.00
Registered voters/turnout	5,032	65.86
Source: YSK

==== 2015 general election ====
Party	Votes	%
Peoples' Democratic Party	1,737	58.76
Justice and Development Party	992	33.56
Republican People's Party	149	5.04
Nationalist Movement Party	37	1.25
Other	41	1.39
Total	2,956	100.00
Valid votes	2,956	97.85
Invalid/blank votes	65	2.15
Total votes	3,021	100.00
Registered voters/turnout	4,283	70.53
Source: YSK

==== 2018 general election ====
Party	Votes	%
Peoples' Democratic Party	1,801	61.38
Justice and Development Party	835	28.46
Republican People's Party	187	6.37
Nationalist Movement Party	33	1.12
Other	78	2.66
Total	2,934	100.00
Valid votes	2,934	97.41
Invalid/blank votes	78	2.59
Total votes	3,012	100.00
Registered voters/turnout	4,191	71.87
Source: YSK

==== 2023 general election ====
Party	Votes	%
Republican People's Party	2,044	78.02
Justice and Development Party	302	11.53
Peoples' Democratic Party	238	9.08
Democracy and Progress Party	22	0.84
Other	14	0.53
Total	2,620	100.00
Valid votes	2,620	97.11
Invalid/blank votes	78	2.89
Total votes	2,698	100.00
Registered voters/turnout	2,620	102.98
Source: YSK

== Twin towns ==
- Ishøj in Denmark since 2006.

== Notable people ==
- Fehmi Demir
- Toktamış Ateş
- Serkan Köse
