= Pegella =

Town of ancient Lycaonia

Coordinates: 38°32′07″N 32°39′56″E

Pegella was a town of ancient Lycaonia, inhabited in Byzantine times.

Its site is located near Azak, Cihanbeyli, Konya Province, Turkey.
