= Freedom and Equality Party =

Former Turkish political party

Freedom and Democracy Party Özgürlük ve Eşitlik Partisi
- Founded: 25 June 1992
- Banned: 4 July 1992
- Preceded by: People's Labor Party
- Merged into: People's Labor Party
- Ideology: Social democracy Kurdish nationalism
- Political position: Centre-left

The Freedom and Equality Party (Turkish: Özgürlük ve Eşitlik Partisi, ÖZEP) was a short-lived pro-Kurdish rights party in Turkey. The party was created in June 1992 before the People's Labor Party (HEP) was banned in July 1992 by the 18 deputies of the HEP. ÖZEP later joined HEP again.

== See also ==
- Racism in Turkey
- Kurds in Turkey
- Human rights of Kurdish people in Turkey
