= Yeşilyurt feces case =

1989 human rights case in Turkey

Coordinates: 37°18′30″N 42°08′20″E

The Yeşilyurt feces case (Turkish: Yeşilyurt dışkı yedirme davas or Yeşilyurt bok yedirme davası) refers to the affair that Turkish gendarmeirs under the command of the "security commander of Silopi-Judi" (Silopi-Cudi Güvenlik Komutanı) Major Cafer Tayyar Çağlayan (Note: Südi oğlu, Kadriye'den doğma, 11.07.1949 doğumlu, Merzifon Gazimahsup mah. C:004/02, H:172'de nüfusa kayıtlı olup, İstanbul Jandarma Lojmanlarında oturur, Jandarma Kıdemli Binbaşısı, Sabıkasız, okur yazar, evli, iki çocuklu, Türk, İslam (T.C. Ankara Üçüncü Ağır Ceza Mahkemesi, Esas No: 1989/24, Karar No: 1990/93)) forced villagers to eat feces on the night of January 14–15, 1989 in Yeşilyurt (Cinibir) village of Cizre District (Mardin Province, in the present day in Şırnak Province) and related trials.

The villagers applied to the European Court of Human Rights where they were represented by Orhan Dogan. The Court ruled in favor of the villagers and against the Turkish state.
