= Leyla Güven =

Kurdish politician

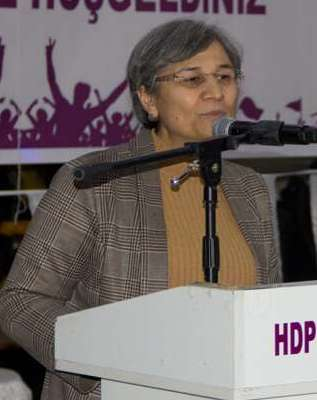

Member of the Grand National Assembly
- In office 24 June 2018 – 4 June 2020
- Constituency: Hakkari (2018)

Co-Chair of the Democratic Society Congress
- Incumbent
- Assumed office 2016

Personal details
- Born: 6 May 1964 (age 61) Yapali, Cihanbeyli, Konya, Turkey
- Occupation: Politician

Leyla Güven (born 6 May 1964, Cihanbeyli, Konya, Turkey) is a Kurdish politician and HDP MP for Hakkari, co-chair of the Democratic Society Congress (DTK) and former mayor of the municipality of Viranşehir in the Şanlıurfa Province of Southeast Anatolia of Turkey, where she represented the former Democratic Society Party (DTP).

== Early life and education ==
The seventh and youngest child of her family, Güven entered into an arranged marriage, in which she had two children who she brought up alone. In 1980 she moved to Germany for family reasons, returning to Turkey in 1985.

In 1994 she set up the Konya branch of Peoples Democracy Party (HADEP) She was active for several years as the Provincial Woman Branch Chairwoman of HADEP, until the party was dissolved in 2003. This involved numerous brushes with the law. In 2000 she was arrested during a HADEP demonstration. She was elected Mayor of Küçükdikili, Adana in the 2004 local elections, when she stood as a candidate for the Social Democratic People's Party (SHP)

In 2006 she was again prosecuted as one of the signatories of the ROJ TV petition to the Danish Prime Minister. In October 2007, she was one of five mayors arrested for expressing solidarity with the arrested mayor Osman Keser. On 20 May 2008 she was one of the signatories of the "Call for a peaceful settlement of the Kurdish question in Turkey", published in the International Herald Tribune.

== Politics ==
In the 2009 Turkish local elections Güven was elected Mayor of Viranşehir. She was appointed a member of the Congress of the Council of Europe in September 2009 and was a key speaker during the Congress Plenary session debate, 14 October 2009, on the situation of local democracy in Southeast Anatolia.

On 24 December 2009, she was detained in a large crack-down of Kurdish politicians. Her trial began in October 2010. Commenting on these arrests, the head of the BBC office in Istanbul suggested that the Turkish prosecutors were "closing down the already limited opportunities for dialogue between the state and its largest minority". In May 2010 Thomas Hammarberg, Council of Europe Commissioner for Human Rights, visited her in prison in Diyarbakir and issued a declaration expressing his concern at the continued detention of so many Kurdish local elected representatives.

In July 2014, after four years of detention, Güven was released with 30 other local elected representatives held in Diyarbakir. On 26 March 2016 she was elected co-chair of the Democratic Society Congress together with Hatip Dicle.

On 22 January 2018, Güven was detained and nine days later arrested for her criticism of the Turkish Military Operation Olive Branch in Afrin. It was alleged that the Democratic Society Congress, of which she is a co-chair, is part of the Kurdistan Communities Union and therefore she was accused of the foundation and leadership of a forbidden organization.

In the Parliamentary Elections of the 24 June 2018, Güven was elected an MP for Hakkari. According to the Law as an MP she was granted parliamentary immunity and her release was issued by a judge on 29 June 2018. The prosecution appealed the verdict and the decision was reversed before she was released. After a hunger strike and an international solidarity campaign she was released in January 2019 and on July of the same year she entered the parliament.

In September 2019, a sentence over six years and 3 months was confirmed by the Supreme Court, but she was not arrested due to her parliamentary immunity. As an MP she supported the HDP mayors who were dismissed from their posts. Due to the statement "Raise your voice against war in Rojava" during the Turkish invasion of north eastern Syria she is investigated for terrorist propaganda since 2019. The International Federation for Human Rights (FIDH) condemned her prosecution and demanded that the Turkish authorities comply with the human rights standards provided by the United Nations. On the 4 June 2020, she was dismissed from parliament together with fellow HDP politician Musa Farisoğulları and the journalist and Republican People's Party (CHP) politician Enis Berberoğlu and subsequently arrested due to her former conviction. On the 9 June she was released as two of her prison sentences were adapted in order to enable her release. On 21 December 2020, she was sentenced to over 22 years imprisonment on grounds that she encouraged the holding of and participated in manifestations and allegedly was a member of an illegal organization which supported Kurdish rebels. The next day she was arrested. On the 17 March 2021, the Turkish state prosecutor before the Court of Cassation Bekir Şahin filed a lawsuit before the Constitutional Court demanding for her and 866 other HDP politicians a five-year ban to engage in politics.

=== Hunger strike ===
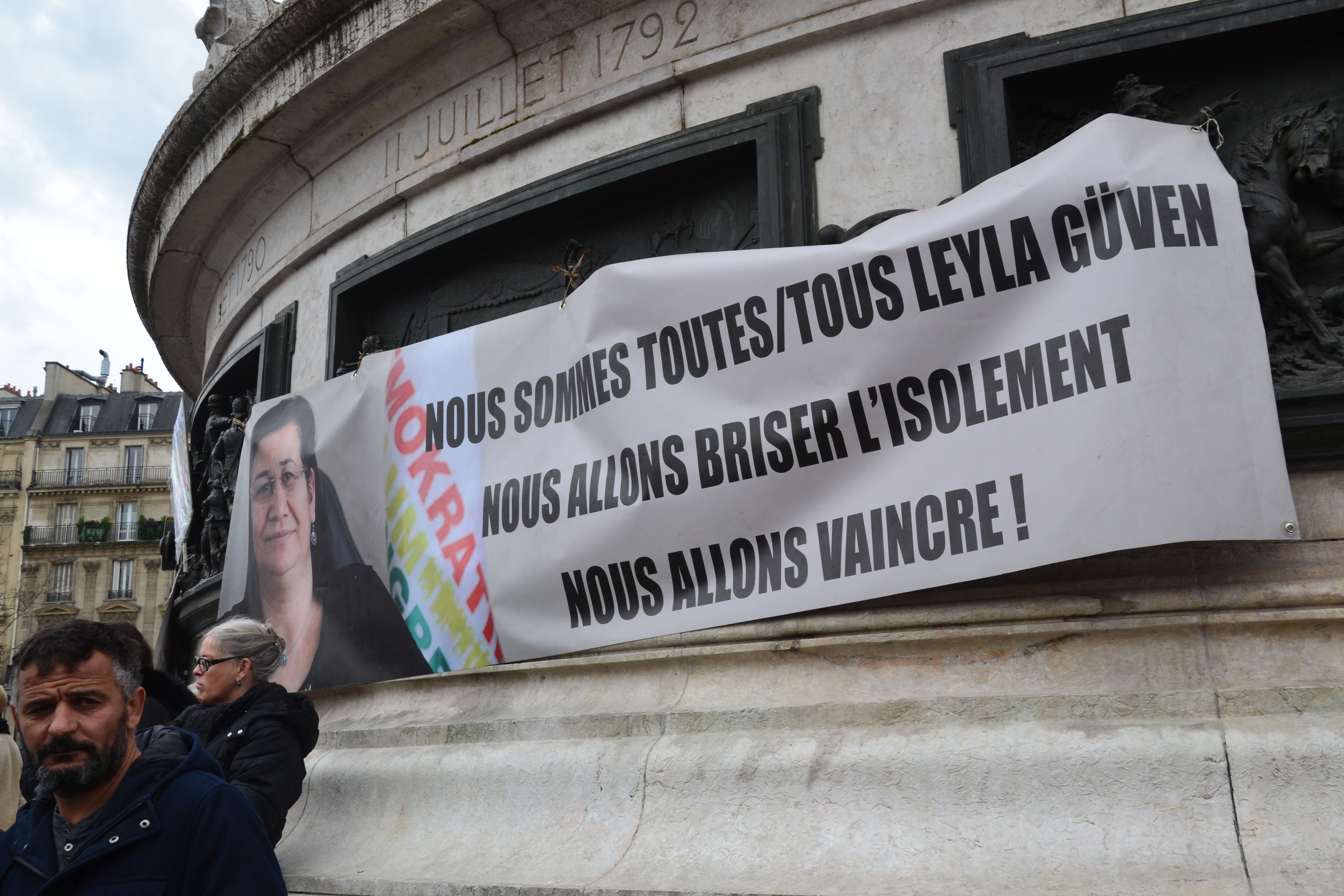
People protesting during the Hunger strike of Leyla Güven

While in detention, on 7 November 2018, Güven declared she was going on a hunger strike to protest the isolation of Abdullah Öcalan, who was imprisoned on the island İmralı, who was a central figure in the Kurdish-Turkish peace process, About 250 political prisoners joined Güven with an indefinite hunger strike. During her hunger strike she only consumed Vitamin B and salty and sugary liquids. On 25 January 2019, after 79 days, Güven was released pending trial. After her release she declared she would continue her hunger strike as her aim was not her own release but that of Öcalan. On 4 February 2019 she was awarded an Honorary Citizenship of Paris. On 26 May 2019 she declared she would end her hunger strike due to the end of the isolation of Öcalan. On 10 July she took the oath necessary to take her seat in parliament.
