= Freedom and Democracy Party =

Pro-Kurdish party in Turkey

Freedom and Democracy Party Kurdish: Turkish: Özgürlük ve Demokrasi Partisi, ÖZDEP
- Leader: Mevlüt İlik
- Founded: 19 October 1992
- Banned: 23 November 1993
- Preceded by: People's Labor Party
- Succeeded by: Democracy Party
- Ideology: Social democracy Kurdish nationalism
- Political position: Centre-left

Freedom and Democracy Party (Turkish: Özgürlük ve Demokrasi Partisi, ÖZDEP) was a pro-Kurdish rights party in Turkey. The party was created in October 1992 after the People's Labor Party (HEP) was banned. Four months after its formation, ÖZDEP was banned by the constitutional court of Turkey on charges of supporting self-determination and for conducting bureaucratic services in the Kurdish language. In an appeal to the European Court of Human Rights, Turkey was ordered to pay compensation for the closure of the party in December 1999.

== See also ==
- Racism in Turkey
- Kurds in Turkey
- Human rights of Kurdish people in Turkey
