= IMC TV =

- Country: Turkey

Programming
- Language(s): Turkish

Ownership
- Owner: Katılım Medya

History
- Launched: 1 May 2011; 14 years ago
- Closed: 4 October 2016; 8 years ago

Links
- Website: www.imc-tv.com

IMC TV (Turkish: İMC TV) was a Turkish nationwide TV channel launched on 1 May 2011. Presenters included Nuray Mert and Fehim Taştekin. In 2011 it hosted a talk show series called Gamurç // Köprü ("Bridge" in Armenian and Turkish) - the first of its kind in Turkey focussing exclusively on Armenian-Turkish relations.

In March 2013 IMC hired Michelle Demishevich, Turkey's first transgender TV reporter.

During the 2013 protests in Turkey, a camera man for IMC was attacked with a tear gas cartridge fired directly at him, and IMC's Gökhan Biçici (editor of Emek Dünyası) was beaten and detained.

It was shut down under the emergency statutory decree issued in the aftermath of the 15 July failed coup d'état, alongside 11 other television and 11 radio stations, on 4 October 2016 when police raided the television station's headquarters in Istanbul.
