= Democratic Society Congress =

Kurdish organization

- Kongreya Civaka Demokratîk; Demokratik Toplum Kongresi
- Abbreviation: DTK; KCD
- Formation: October 2007
- Founded at: Diyarbakır
- Type: NGO
- Purpose: Kurdish rights
- Chairman: Berdan Öztürk
- Chairwoman: Leyla Güven
- Website: https://www.kcd-dtk.org/english-2/

The Democratic Society Congress (Turkish: Demokratik Toplum Kongresi, Kurdish: Kongreya Civaka Demokratik) is a pro-Kurdish NGO favouring the implementation of Democratic Confederalism in Turkish politics. Its foundation congress was held on 26–29 October 2007.

== Structure ==
It has 2 co-chairs, a chairman and a chairwoman, a general assembly with 501 delegates, an executive council of 21 members and several committees. 40% of the delegates of the general assembly are represented by labour unions, civil society organizations and political parties, 40% are representatives from local assemblies. The congress meets approximately every three months to discuss the resolutions which come from the distinct committees. The DTK has assemblies in several administrative subdivisions like in districts, cities, villages and neighborhoods. For each street in a neighborhood, there should exist a commune. These are then followed by assemblies in their respective neighborhood, town, city or region. Each commune is independent in their decision making process but is still in a relationship with their respective neighborhood council which coordinates the decisions in the different communes. The DTK has an executive committee of 5 members, a coordination council with 13 members and a permanent assembly of 101 delegates. Several committees are formed by the DTK.

- Economy commission
- Women's commission
- Ecology and Local Government commission
- Youth commission
- Faith commission
- Health
- Diplomacy commission
- Status and Law commission
- Art and Cultural commission
- Science commission
- Human Rights commission
- Political Affairs Commission

== Ideology ==
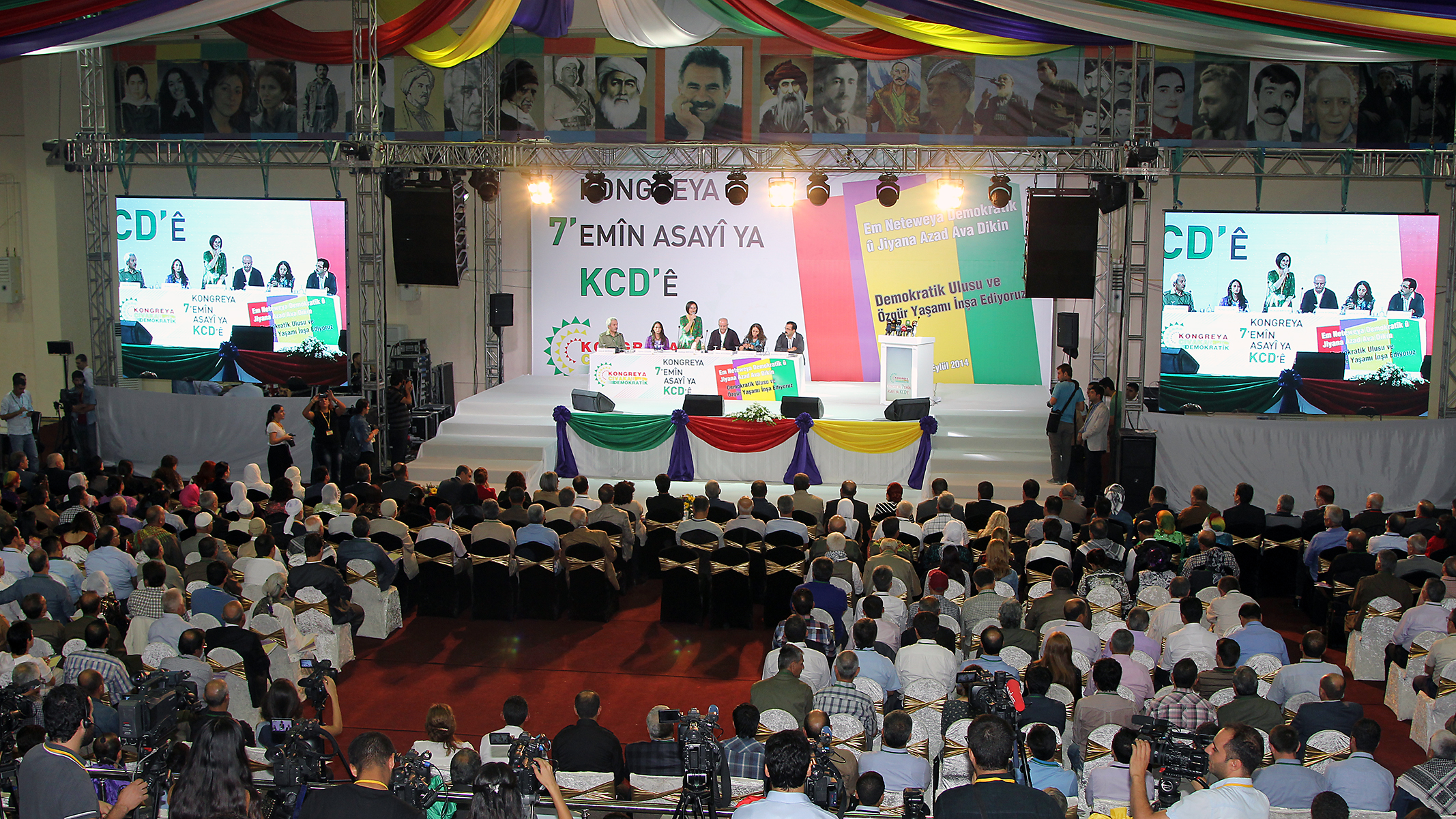
Democratic Society Congress in 2015

On 14 July 2011 it announced its support for Democratic Autonomy after having held an extraordinary congress in Diyarbakır with 850 participants. The DTK is also active in the solution finding process for the Kurdish–Turkish conflict in Turkey and issued a proposal for a political solution in December 2015. According to this proposal it was supported the idea of issuing a new constitution after which Turkey would be structured into several democratic autonomous regions represented in the Grand National Assembly of Turkey.

== Prosecution of sympathizers and members ==
Its members are often prosecuted by the Turkish authorities, and the attendance of events organized by the DTK can be viewed as a reason of prosecution as was the case for Evrensel writer Yusuf Karataş. Also the attendance of a DTK congress as a non member can be viewed as a reason for prosecution according to the DTK. Numerous raids were conducted at the delegates houses that were on the list which was confiscated during a search in October 2018. Also, Leyla Güven, received a demand to resign from the post of co-chair of the DTK by the Turkish authorities. Despite the legal existence of the DTK, membership in the DTK was deemed as an evidence of being a member in a criminal organization in the indictment of the closure case of the pro-Kurdish HDP.

=== Leaders ===
Co-Chairs of the DTK
Co-Chairs		Term
Yüksel Genç	Hatip Dicle	2007–2010
Aysel Tuğluk	Ahmet Türk	2010–2014
Selma Irmak	Hatip Dicle	2014–2016
Leyla Güven	Hatip Dicle	2016–2017
Leyla Güven	Berdan Öztürk	2017
