= Civil Friday prayer =

The Civil Friday prayer (Turkish: Sivil Cuma namazı) was a protest movement among Kurds in Turkey after a group of Kurdish imams had boycotted Diyanet, the Turkish state institution for religious affairs, due to the Denial of Kurds by Turkey.

== History ==
Kurdish imams, colloquially called meles, were usually graduates of local unrecognised Shafi'i schools rather than the official İmam Hatip schools. They had a highly respected status in Kurdish society which extended beyond religious affairs. In 2011, many Kurdish imams, mostly affiliated with DİAY-DER, declared their boycott of Diyanet, due to Diyanet being operated by the Turkish state and not offering services in the Kurdish language. The movement led prayers in public areas, such as streets or parks, purposely outside of the mosques. The movement began in Diyarbakır and "rapidly spread" to other Kurdish cities. Thousands of Kurds began to regularly pray in Dağkapı square, Diyarbakır, where Sheikh Said was executed in 1925. Selahattin Demirtaş supported the movement and told Kurds to avoid "Turkist", "Fethullahist", and "statist" mosques. The movement challenged the Turkish government both politically and religiously, politically because the sermons were given in Kurdish, and religiously because the prayers were held in the streets instead of state mosques, and the imams wrote their own sermons instead of reading the sermons written by Diyanet. The largest gathering in Diyarbakır was around 5,000 people. The movement had pressured the state to give de facto permission to sermons in Kurdish amid the peace process. Kandil of 2011 was the first time the ceremony had been conducted in Kurdish in the Great Mosque of Diyarbakır during the Republic era. The movement had challenged "the authority of the state as well as the secular Kurdish actors."

In a 2011 interview, a protestor stated "we are Kurds. This is our native language, the language that our parents taught us. Let us speak this language in the courts, in the mosques. Until we are no longer forbidden to speak Kurdish in our mosques, we will do our prayer on the street". Sermons in Kurdish were banned by Diyanet. Diyanet had been criticised on different occasions for its exclusion of the Kurdish language from multilingual signs at mosques, whereas the signs included English, Turkish, Russian and Arabic, and were in Kurdish majority cities. Furthermore, Diyanet provided Turkish, Arabic, German, French, English, Spanish, Italian and Russian language services for sermons, whereas Kurdish was not included.

In a June 1, 2011 rally, Recep Tayyip Erdoğan criticised the movement, which caused disagreements with senior AKP politicians of Kurdish descent. State-appointed Diyanet clerics of Kurdish descent had also supported the movement, while another supporter of the movement rebuffed Diyanet and Turkish government claims, and stated that "they think these prayers are only politically motivated. Yet, in reality, we are only demanding what Islam promises to us. When it comes to Kurds they cease to be Muslims."

A cleric who participated in the movement stated "clearly God wants us to communicate with our jamaat in our own language. Our jamaat is composed of Kurds, we are Kurds, why are we not allowed to give our sermons in Kurdish? What sort of Islam does the AKP believe in?", while another stated that if the AKP government was "religious, as it claims to be, then it should allow us to give the sermons in Kurdish" and that "Turkish Muslims keep saying we are religious siblings. However, in their eyes, we are siblings so long as they are the elder sibling."

In December 2011, Diyanet claimed that it would hire 1000 Kurdish imams, although the claim was dismissed as being for AKP political gains. In 2013, Abdullah Öcalan called for a "Democratic Islam Congress" amid the rise of the Islamic State.
