= Hatip Dicle =

Turkish politician (born 1955)

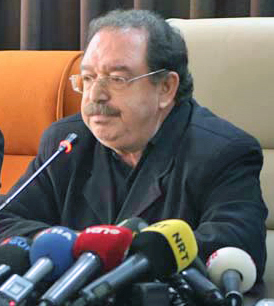
- Hatip Dicle

Member of the Grand National Assembly
- In office 14 November 1991 – 3 March 1994
- Constituency: Diyarbakır (1991)

Chairman of the Democracy Party
- In office 13 December 1993 – 3 March 1994

Chairman of the Democratic Society Congress
- In office 2014–2017

Personal details
- Born: Mehmet Hatip Dicle; 1955 (age 70–71) Diyarbakır, Turkey
- Party: People's Labor Party, Democracy Party
- Education: Istanbul Technical University

Mehmet Hatip Dicle (born 1955, Diyarbakir, Turkey), is a Kurdish politician from Turkey. He was a member of the Democracy Party, then of the Peace and Democracy Party (BDP).

== Early life and education ==
Dicle grew up in a Kurdish family with Islamic values. He attended the Ziya Gökalp high school in Diyarbakir and enrolled into the civil engineering department of the Istanbul Technical University from which he graduated in 1979. He began his political activity in the 1970s, involving himself in the Revolutionary Cultural Eastern Hearths (DDKO) and joining the People's Labor Party (HEP) (Halkin Emek Partisi, working party of the people). In the late 1980s he travelled to Palestine where he joined the Fatah and received military training.

== Political career ==
In 1991 he was elected to the parliament within a political alliance of the Social Democratic Populist Party (SHP) and the HEP. In 1993, the HEP was banned. In anticipation of the ban, the Kurdish politicians had already set up the Democracy Party (Demokrasi Partisi, or DEP). On 12 December 1993, Dicle was elected party chairman, which he stayed until March 1994. As a chairman, he guided the DEP through violent times as DEP politicians and members were detained and its candidates homes where raided by the Turkish authorities ahead of the Municipal elections of 1994. As a consequence, he announced in February 1994 that the party would not run in the elections due to an "anti-democratic environment".

=== Prosecution ===
On 2 March 1994, Parliament lifted the parliamentary immunity of Dicle and he was arrested. On 8 August 1994 he was convicted, together with Leyla Zana, Orhan Doğan and Selim Sadak of membership in an organization (Kurdistan Workers' Party) and sentenced to 15 years in prison. In June 1994 also the Democracy Party was banned.

On 9 June 2004, the 3 prisoners were released after a retrial and pressure from the European Union, but Dicle was still banned from political activity.

He was sentenced to 20 months in prison for a statement that he made to the ANKA agency in 2007 about the Kurdish question. This was interpreted by the Ankara 11th High Criminal Court as siding with terrorism, although other commentators have pointed out that the statement was advocating a peaceful solution and that the sentence is evidence of Turkey's curbs on freedom of expression.

He was one of the first Co-Chairs of the Democratic Society Congress after its foundation in 2007.

After the DTP was closed down in early December 2009, Dicle was again arrested as part of the KCK investigation.

==== 2011 election ====
In the June 2011 parliamentary elections he ran as an independent candidate for the Diyarbakir Province, supported by the Labour, Democracy and Freedom Block and was elected with 78.220 votes. However, after the election, Turkey's Supreme Election Board (YSK) annulled his election, because of his former conviction on a terrorist charge. His fellow MPs reacted by boycotting the Parliament. He was replaced in the Turkish Parliament by a member of the AK Party, Oya Eronat, who had come sixth in the election, with a much smaller vote.

Rıza Türmen, former Turkish Ambassador to the Council of Europe and judge at the European Court of Human Rights, condemned the decision as "not only against universal laws, it also violates national regulation and norms". He called for Articles 7 and 76 of the Turkish Constitution to be amended to prevent such situations arising in future. His case was also taken up by British MPs who lodged an early day motion in the House of Commons of the United Kingdom.

In 2014 he was released from prison and elected as co-chair of the Democratic Society Congress (DTK). He was succeeded in 2017 by Berdan Öztürk.

== In Exile ==
Since 2017 he lives in exile in Germany.
