= Ahmet Fehmi Işıklar =

Turkish politician (born 1941)

General Chairman of the People's Labour Party
- In office 7 June 1990 – 14 July 1993

Member of the Grand National Assembly of Turkey
- In office 14 December 1987 – 17 August 1993
- Constituency: Bursa, Diyarbakır

Personal details
- Born: 1941 (age 84–85) Urfa, Turkey
- Party: Social Democratic Populist Party (SHP), People's Labour Party (HEP)
- Children: 4

Ahmet Fehmi Işıklar (born 1941, Urfa) is a Turkish politician, and worked as a unionist, a member of the executive board and General Secretary of the Metal-İş Federation, the President of Çağdaş Metal İş, and the Secretary General of DİSK. He also served as a member of parliament for Bursa in the 18th term and for Diyarbakır in the 19th term (according to Article 84/3 of the Constitution, his membership ended on 17 August 1993). He served as the Deputy Speaker of the Grand National Assembly of Turkey and the General Chairman of the People's Labour Party. He graduated from Kirikkale Machinery and Technician School. He is married and has four children.

== Life and political career ==
Işıklar's political career began with his involvement in the Social Democratic Populist Party (SHP), later leading HEP during its brief existence. Işıklar's political activities focused on advocating for the rights of the Kurdish people in Turkey. He also played a key role in the formation of political alliances with left-wing and pro-Kurdish groups.

Işıklar became a prominent figure in Turkish politics during the late 1980s. He served as the General Chairman of the People's Labour Party starting in 1990. Under his leadership, the HEP advocated for the recognition of Kurdish rights, alongside a broader progressive agenda. The HEP was dissolved in 1993 by Turkish authorities, amid increasing government pressure on pro-Kurdish movements. Following this, Işıklar continued to be involved in Kurdish politics and has since advocated for cooperation between pro-Kurdish and Turkish nationalist parties, including the HDP and MHP.

=== Post-political activities ===
After the dissolution of HEP, Işıklar continued to make political statements and occasionally aligned with other political movements. He has been involved in several discussions regarding the political future of Kurdish activism within Turkey, and he has urged both the HDP and MHP to work together for a more inclusive political environment. His views have earned him a place as a respected figure in Turkish Kurdish politics, despite his departure from the formal political scene.
