= Rights and Freedoms Party =

Rights and Freedoms Party Hak ve Özgürlükler Partisi Partiya Maf û Azadiyan
- Abbreviation: HAK-PAR
- Leader: Düzgün Kaplan
- Founder: Abdülmelik Fırat
- Founded: 11 February 2002
- Headquarters: Diyarbakır
- Membership (2026): ▲1,740
- Ideology: Kurdish nationalism; Federalism; Pluralist democracy; Equalitarianism; Libertarianism; Solidarism; Participatory democracy; Decentralization; Progressivism; Environmentalism; Secularism; Pro-Europeanism
- Colours: Red, yellow & black

Website
- www.hakpar.org.tr

The Rights and Freedoms Party (Kurdish: Partiya Maf û Azadiyan, Turkish: Hak ve Özgürlükler Partisi, abbreviated HAK-PAR) is a Kurdish nationalist political party in Turkey.

Advocating federalism as a means of increasing Kurdish autonomy in the south-east of the country, the party split from the Democratic People's Party (DEHAP) in 2002. The party's head office is in Diyarbakır. Until his death in October 2015, the party was headed by Fehmi Demir.

In the local elections of 2014, the party won the municipal mayoralty in Konukbekler, Muş, attaining 43,846 votes. In the June 2015 general election, HAK-PAR participated for the first time in a general election, winning 58,698 votes.

== List of Leaders ==
#	Name	Term starts	Term ends
1	Abdülmelik Fırat	2002	2006
2	Sertaç Bucak	2006	2008
3	Bayram Bozyel	2008	2012
4	Kemal Burkay	2012	2014
5	Fehmi Demir	2014	2015
6	Refik Karakoç	2016	2019
7	Abdullatif Epözdemir	2019	2022
8	Düzgün Kaplan	2022	Incumbent

== Elections ==
=== General elections ===
Election	Votes	Percentage	Seats
June 2015	58,716	%0.13	0 / 550
November 2015	110,161	%0.23	0 / 550
2023	42,547	0.08%	0 / 600

=== Local elections ===
Election	Votes	Percentage	Municipalities
2009	29,392	0.07%	0
2014	43,846	0,09%	1
2019	Not eligible to contest		
2024	32,633	0,07%	0
