= Orhan Doğan =

Turkish politician

Member of the Grand National Assembly
- In office 14 November 1991 – 17 March 1994
- Constituency: Şırnak (1991)

Personal details
- Born: 25 July 1955 Mardin, Turkey
- Died: 29 June 2007 (aged 51) Doğubayazıt, Ağrı, Turkey
- Citizenship: Turkey

Orhan Doğan (25 July 1955 – 29 June 2007) was a Kurdish human rights lawyer and politician of the Democratic Society Party.

== Education and professional career ==
In 1974 he went to the University of Ankara to study law and began working as an accountant at the Ankara Altındağ Primary Education Directorate. After graduating he took up an internship with Ismail Mungan. father of Murathan Mungan. Later he settled to Cizre where he worked as a lawyer and during his term as the head of the Turkish Human Rights Association in the Sirnak province he was a defender of Kurdish rights. As a lawyer, he successfully represented the ones who were forced to eat feces by the Turkish authorities in Yeşilyurt before the European Court of Human Rights.

== Political career ==
He contributed to the Kurdish Report of the Social Democrat Populist Party (SHP) and later resigned from the party in 1989 in protest against the dismissal of seven Kurdish deputies for attending a Kurdish Identity and Human Rights Conference in Paris.

In 1991 he was elected to the Turkish Parliament, later joining the Democracy Party (DEP). He was in Cizre during the Newroz celebrations of 1992 when many attendants were massacred by the Turkish authorities. In 1994, his parliamentary immunity was lifted and Doğan was arrested on the 17 March. On the 8 December 1994 he was convicted, together with other DEP deputies Leyla Zana, Hatip Dicle and Selim Sadak, of membership in an organization (Kurdistan Workers' Party, PKK) and sentenced to 15 years in prison. He was included as one of the prisoners of conscience of the Amnesty intentional. On the 17 July 2001, the European Court of Human Rights in Strasbourg said the trial against Doğan was unfair. On the 22 April 2004 the European Parliament issued a resolution hoping that the court of appeals quashes the sentence given to Doğan and others and that an amnesty will be declared to all imprisoned because of their political views.

Upon his release in 2004 he helped to found the Democratic Society Party (DTP).

=== Death ===
He died in 2007 following a heart attack he suffered, while giving a speech at a festival in Doğubeyazıt. To his funeral ceremony attended crowds of mourners, supporters of the PKK and an emissary from the Patriotic Union of Kurdistan (PUK). He was buried in the cemetery in Cizre.

== Personal life ==
Orhan Doğan was the father of five children. One is the journalist and politician Aysegul Dogan.
