= Şırnak (electoral district) =

Electoral district for the Grand National Assembly of Turkey

Coordinates: 37°34′N 42°34′E

- electoral district for the Grand National Assembly of Turkey
- Şırnak shown within Turkey
- Province: Şırnak
- Electorate: 268,308

Current electoral district
- Created: 1991
- Seats: 4 Historical: 3 (1991-2011)
- Turnout at last election: 87.05%
- Representation
- DEM: 3 / 4
- AK Party: 1 / 4

Şırnak is an electoral district of the Grand National Assembly of Turkey. It elects four members of parliament (deputies) to represent the province of the same name for a four-year term by the D'Hondt method, a party-list proportional representation system.

== Members ==
Population reviews of each electoral district are conducted before each general election, which can lead to certain districts being granted a smaller or greater number of parliamentary seats. Şırnak became a province in 1990 and first sent members of parliament to Ankara - three of them - the following year. The seat allocation was increased to four ahead of the 2011 election.

There are currently four sitting members of parliament representing Şırnak, one of which is from the governing party. Şırnak was a district where the pro-Kurdish Peace and Democracy Party (BDP) ran independent candidates in an attempt to overcome the 10 percent national electoral threshold. Three independent candidates were elected here in 2011; all have since joined the BDP.

== General elections ==
Election results:

=== 2011 ===
Party	Votes	%	+/–
Peace and Democracy Party	125,282	72.38	3
Justice and Development Party	35,582	20.56	1
Republican People's Party	5,139	2.97	–
Nationalist Movement Party	2,029	1.17	–
Other	5,065	2.93	–
Total	173,097	100.00	–
Valid votes	173,097	97.65	
Invalid/blank votes	4,160	2.35	
Total votes	177,257	100.00	
Registered voters/turnout	203,942	86.92	

=== June 2015 ===
Party	Votes	%	+/–	Seats	+/–
Peoples' Democratic Party	188,012	85.32	new	4	+4
Justice and Development Party	19,357	8.78	–11.26	0	–1
Nationalist Movement Party	5,315	2.41	+1.30	–	–
Republican People's Party	2,111	0.96	–1.99	–	–
Free Cause Party	2,826	1.28		–	–
Other	2,752	1.25		–	–
Total	220,373	100.00	–	4	–
Valid votes	220,373	98.40			
Invalid/blank votes	3,572	1.60			
Total votes	223,945	100.00			
Registered voters/turnout	243,126	92.11			

=== November 2015 ===
Party	Votes	%	+/–	Seats	+/–
Peoples' Democratic Party	183,320	85.53	+0.21	4	0
Justice and Development Party	23,822	11.11	+2.33	0	0
Nationalist Movement Party	2,660	1.24	–1.17	–	–
Republican People's Party	2,304	1.07	+0.11	–	–
Other	2,221	1.04		–	–
Total	214,327	100.00	–	4	–
Valid votes	214,327	97.73			
Invalid/blank votes	4,982	2.27			
Total votes	219,309	100.00			
Registered voters/turnout	243,425	90.09			

=== 2018 ===
Party	Votes	%	+/–	Seats	+/–
Peoples' Democratic Party	162,969	71.88	–13.65	3	–1
Justice and Development Party	38,523	16.99	+5.88	1	+1
Nationalist Movement Party	8,721	3.85	+2.61	–	–
Republican People's Party	5,048	2.23	+1.16	–	–
Free Cause Party	4,847	2.14	+2.14	–	–
Good Party	4,284	1.89	new	–	–
Felicity Party	1,001	0.44		–	–
Other	1,345	0.59		–	–
Total	226,738	100.00	–	4	–
Valid votes	226,738	97.08			
Invalid/blank votes	6,827	2.92			
Total votes	233,565	100.00			
Registered voters/turnout	268,308	87.05			

=== 2023 ===
Party	Votes	%	Seats
Party of Greens and the Left Future	170,695	64.43	3
Justice and Development Party	54,283	20.49	1
Republican People's Party	21,587	8.15	–
Nationalist Movement Party	5,682	2.14	–
Other	12,675	4.78	–
Total	264,922	100.00	4
Valid votes	264,922	96.51	
Invalid/blank votes	9,594	3.49	
Total votes	274,516	100.00	
Registered voters/turnout	324,179	84.68	

== Presidential elections ==
=== 2014 ===
Candidate	Party	Votes	%
Selahattin Demirtaş	People's Democratic Party	158,836	83.17
Recep Tayyip Erdoğan	Justice and Development Party	28,243	14.79
Ekmeleddin İhsanoğlu	Republican People's Party	3,891	2.04
Total		190,970	100.00
Valid votes		190,970	98.75
Invalid/blank votes		2,420	1.25
Total votes		193,390	100.00
Registered voters/turnout		235,390	82.16

=== 2018 ===
Candidate	Party	Votes	%
Selahattin Demirtaş	People's Democratic Party	163,797	72.06
Recep Tayyip Erdoğan	Justice and Development Party	48,199	21.21
Muharrem İnce	Republican People's Party	11,149	4.91
Meral Akşener	Good Party	3,101	1.36
Other	1,047	0.46	
Total		227,293	100.00
Valid votes		227,293	97.30
Invalid/blank votes		6,315	2.70
Total votes		233,608	100.00
Registered voters/turnout		268,308	87.07
