= Cihanbeyli =

- District and municipality
- Logo

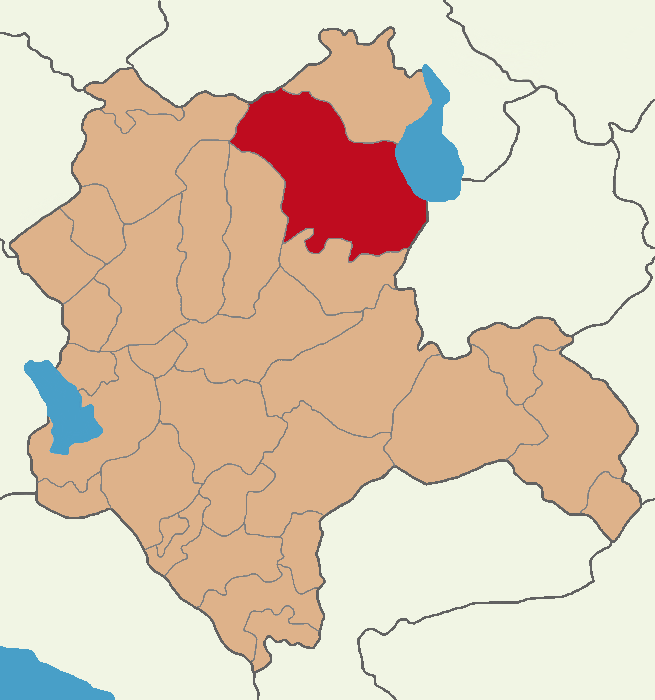
- Map showing Cihanbeyli District in Konya Province

- Location within Turkey Location within Turkey Central Anatolia
- Coordinates: 38°39′29″N 32°55′41″E
- Country: Turkey
- Province: Konya

Government
  - Mayor: Fırat Kızılkaya (CHP)
- Area: 3,702 km^{2} (1,429 sq mi)
- Elevation: 950 m (3,120 ft)
- Population (2022): 50,677
  - Density: 13.69/km^{2} (35.45/sq mi)
- Time zone: UTC+3 (TRT)
- Area code: 0332
- Climate: BSk
- Website: www.cihanbeyli.bel.tr

Cihanbeyli is a municipality and district of Konya Province, Turkey. Its area is 3,702 km^{2}, and its population is 50,677 (2022). According to a 2017 estimate by the German Federal Agency for Civic Education, Kurds make up at least 50% of the population of Cihanbeyli.

== History ==
Cihanbeyli was part of Pitassa in antiquity.

== Composition ==
There are 47 neighbourhoods in Cihanbeyli District:

- Ağabeyli
- Ahirigüzel
- Atçeken
- Bahçelievler
- Beyliova
- Böğrüdelik
- Bulduk
- Büyükbeşkavak
- Çimen
- Çölyaylası
- Cumhuriyet
- Damlakuyu
- Gemecik
- Göktepe
- Gölyazı
- Günyüzü
- Hodoğlu
- İnsuyu
- Kale
- Kandil
- Karabağ
- Karatepe
- Karşıyaka
- Kayı
- Kelhasan
- Kırkışla
- Kocatepe
- Köprübaşı
- Korkmazlar
- Küçükbeşkavak
- Kuşca
- Kütükuşağı
- Mutlukonak
- Pınarbaşı
- Sağlık
- Sığırcık
- Taşpınar
- Tüfekçipınarı
- Turanlar
- Üzerliktepe
- Uzuncayayla
- Yapalı
- Yeniceoba
- Yeniyayla
- Yeşilöz
- Yünlükuyu
- Zaferiye

== Climate ==
Cihanbeyli's climate is classified as cold semi-arid (Köppen: BSk). The town experiences hot, dry summers and cold, snowy winters.

Climate data for Cihanbeyli (1991–2020)
Month	Jan	Feb	Mar	Apr	May	Jun	Jul	Aug	Sep	Oct	Nov	Dec	Year
Mean daily maximum °C (°F)	4.5 (40.1)	7.2 (45.0)	12.7 (54.9)	18.1 (64.6)	23.5 (74.3)	28.2 (82.8)	32.0 (89.6)	31.9 (89.4)	27.4 (81.3)	20.9 (69.6)	12.6 (54.7)	6.1 (43.0)	18.8 (65.8)
Daily mean °C (°F)	−0.2 (31.6)	1.6 (34.9)	6.1 (43.0)	11.1 (52.0)	16.1 (61.0)	20.6 (69.1)	24.2 (75.6)	24.0 (75.2)	19.3 (66.7)	13.3 (55.9)	6.1 (43.0)	1.5 (34.7)	12.0 (53.6)
Mean daily minimum °C (°F)	−4.0 (24.8)	−3.2 (26.2)	0.2 (32.4)	4.4 (39.9)	8.9 (48.0)	12.8 (55.0)	15.8 (60.4)	15.9 (60.6)	11.4 (52.5)	6.7 (44.1)	0.8 (33.4)	−2.1 (28.2)	5.7 (42.3)
Average precipitation mm (inches)	31.49 (1.24)	28.62 (1.13)	34.46 (1.36)	36.8 (1.45)	34.19 (1.35)	38.49 (1.52)	7.41 (0.29)	6.52 (0.26)	14.28 (0.56)	24.97 (0.98)	29.05 (1.14)	39.82 (1.57)	326.1 (12.84)
Average precipitation days (≥ 1.0 mm)	6.2	5.2	5.8	6.2	5.8	5.4	2.1	2.1	3.3	4.5	4.5	7.1	58.2
Average relative humidity (%)	80.2	74.0	64.9	60.3	56.6	50.3	41.3	42.0	46.0	58.5	71.7	80.8	60.5
Mean monthly sunshine hours	95.6	133.0	182.1	225.0	281.9	310.3	354.7	342.0	269.4	208.0	154.3	95.1	2,651.5
Source: NOAA

== Demography ==
Cihanbeyli district has a significant Kurdish population from various Kurdish tribes.

Name	Ethnicity
Cihanbeyli	Kurdish and others
Beyliova	Kurdish
Böğrüdelik	Siberian Tatar and Kurdish
Bulduk	Kurdish
Büyükbeşkavak	Kurdish
Çimen	Kurdish
Çöl	Kurdish
Gölyazı	Kurdish
Günyüzü	Kurdish
Hodoğlu	Turkish
Kandil	Kurdish
Kelhasan	Kurdish
Kırkışla	Kurdish
Korkmazlar	Kurdish
Kuşça	Kurdish
Küçükbeşkavak	Kurdish
Kütükuşağı	Kurdish
Sağlık	Kurdish
Taşpınar	Kurdish and Turkish
Turanlar	Kurdish
Yapalı	Kurdish
Yeniceoba	Kurdish
Yeşildere	Kurdish
Yünlükuyu	Kurdish
Zaferiye	Kurdish

== Notable people ==
- Eyüp Can (boxer) (1964*), Boxer
- Leyla Güven (1964*), Kurdish Politician
