= People's Labour Party (Turkey) =

Former political party in Turkey

People's Labour Party Halkın Emek Partisi
- Abbreviation: HEP
- Leader: Ahmet Fehmi Işıklar
- Founded: 7 June 1990
- Banned: 14 July 1993
- Split from: Social Democratic Populist Party
- Succeeded by: Freedom and Democracy Party; Freedom and Equality Party
- Ideology: Social democracy; Kurdish nationalism
- Political position: Centre-left
- International affiliation: Socialist International

The People's Labour Party (Turkish: Halkın Emek Partisi, HEP), sometimes translated as the People's Work Party, was a pro-Kurdish political party in Turkey.

== History ==
It was founded on 7 June 1990 by seven members of the Turkish Grand National Assembly expelled from the Social Democratic Populist Party (SHP). They were expelled from the SHP for having attended a Kurdish congress organized by the Kurdish Institute in Paris. HEP was led by Ahmet Fehmi Işıklar. It first viewed itself as a party for the whole of Turkey. But that a party represented in the Turkish Parliament openly demanded more rights for the Kurds was new to Turkish politics. Its politicians held speeches in front of audiences of up to 10,000 people in Southeast Turkey, which was deemed a danger to public security by the Turkish authorities. In view of the "Kurdish question", the HEP vigorously campaigned for the right to self-determination of the people by means of a federation, referendum or a similar kind of solution found by the people. Following the Newroz celebrations, president Işıklar declared during the first party congress in June 1991 that several circles tried to brand the party as a Kurdish party. As the party is a party of the suppressed, within this framework they are proud of being called a Kurdish party. Some days later, he reiterated that they were not uncomfortable with being called a 'Kurdish Party' since it was the Kurds whose rights were most infringed. After this declaration, several of the Turkish founding members resigned.

=== 1991 elections ===
For the 1991 Turkish general election, it formed an electoral alliance with the SHP of Erdal Inönü, and 22 politicians from the HEP entered the parliament with this alliance. The HEP was involved in peace negotiations with the PKK. On 16 April 1993 chairman Ahmet Türk and five other MPs traveled to the Bar Elias in Lebanon, demanding a prolongation of the cease fire declared by the PKK before. The cease-fire was prolonged at a press conference given the same day.

=== Ban ===
Due to the overt promotion of Kurdish cultural and political rights, the party was banned by the Constitutional Court in July 1993. The party was succeeded by the Democracy Party (DEP) established in May 1993. In 2002, the European Court of Human Rights held that—since its methods and aims were peaceful and democratic—its dissolution was not justified as "necessary in a democratic society" as required by Article 11 and granted Feridun Yazar, Ahmet Karataş and Ibrahim Aksoy each €10,000 and another €10,000 combined due to the banning of their party.

Vedat Aydın, the Diyarbakır branch chairman of HEP, was found dead on a road near Malatya on 7 July 1991, two days after armed men had taken him from his home in Diyarbakır. His wife, Şükran Aydın, states that her husband's murder was a turning point and that there was a sudden increase in the number of unsolved murders in Turkey's southeastern region following his death. She says that JİTEM, a clandestine unit within the Turkish Gendarmerie, was responsible for his murder.

== Parliamentarians ==
- Leyla Zana
- Ahmet Türk
- Mahmut Kılınç
- Adnan Ekmen
- Nizamettin Toĝuç
- Abdulkerim Zilan
- Hatip Dicle
- Ahmet Fehmi Işıklar
- Salih Sümer
- Mahmut Uyanık
- Mehmet Ali Eren
- Mehmet Sincar
- Sedat Yurtdaş
- Ali Yiĝit
- Muzzafer Demir
- Sırrı Sakık
- Emin Ever
- Zübeyir Aydar
- Naif Güneş
- Mahmut Alınak
- Orhan Doğan
- Selim Sadak
- Remzi Kartal
