= Democracy Party (Turkey) =

Democracy Party Kurdish: Partiya Demokrasiyê Turkish: Demokrasi Partisi, DEP
- Leader: Leyla Zana
- President: Yaşar Kaya June 1993–December 1993; Hatip Dicle December 1993–June 1994
- Founded: 7 May 1993
- Banned: 16 June 1994
- Preceded by: Freedom and Democracy Party
- Succeeded by: People's Democracy Party
- Ideology: Social democracy Kurdish rights Socialism; Federalism; Separatism
- Political position: Centre-left

The Democracy Party (Turkish: Demokrasi Partisi, DEP, Kurmanji: Partiya Demokrasiyê) was a pro-Kurdish political party in Turkey founded on the 7 May 1993.

== History ==
Ahmet Türk, the former chairman of the People's Labor Party (HEP) and most of the former MPs of the HEP joined the party after its first party congress on the 27 June 1993. As the first party chair was elected Yaşar Kaya. The party decided to launch a peace campaign focused on the Turkish Kurdish conflict which would take place from the 2 August to the 1 September 1993. The campaign was prohibited by the Turkish authorities and the events that have been planned in Diyarbakır and Batman were canceled. And on the 17 September 1993 Kaya was arrested due to his participation at public event in Germany as well as the congress of the Kurdistan Democratic Party (KDP) in Iraq. He was released on the 8 December of the same year and Kaya fled to Germany. On the 12 December 1993 Hatip Dicle was elected the new chairman. Dicle was a known supporter of the PKK and demanded it be viewed as a political party and not a terrorist organization. The party became divided over the issue of the PKK, and two factions - moderate and radical - appeared. Due to the support of Kurdish rights the members of the HEP and DEP came under widespread attacks.

=== 1994 local elections ===
Between 1991 and 1994, more than 50 of its members were murdered. As a result, the party decided to withdraw from the municipal elections which were planned to take place on 27 March 1994. The party justified this decision with the casualties, but personal and material the party had to affront during the last 45 days and that several of the candidates which the party put up for the elections withdrew, as they feared for their life.

=== Ban ===
On 2 March 1994, the Turkish parliament lifted the immunity of two deputies from the DEP and Orhan Doğan and Hatip Dicle were detained. On 2 April 1994, occurred a deadly attack on the Bazaar in Istanbul for which the PKK did not claim an authorship. The Turkish Government anyway blamed the PKK but also the DEP. In reaction to the attack, the Turkish Prime Minister Tansu Çiller deemed the DEP just a cover for the PKK and called for end of a PKK presence in the Grand National Assembly of Turkey. Until 16 June 1994, six party members were imprisoned and the party was banned.

On 8 August 1994, the deputies Orhan Doğan, Leyla Zana, Selim Sadak and Hatip Dicle were sentenced to 15 years in prison. They were released in June 2009 following a decision of Turkey's Appeal Court, after Turkey experienced some pressure from the European Parliament, asking for their release and condemning their imprisonment.

The DEP was succeeded by the People's Democracy Party (HADEP), established in May 1994.

In December 2002, the European Court of Human Rights held DEP's dissolution to be contrary to Article 11 of the European Convention on Human Rights (freedom of association) and ordered Turkey to pay €200,000 which shall be distributed among the parties members.
