= Faculty of Political Sciences at Sakarya University =

Faculty of Political Sciences at Sakarya University (SAU SBF)
- Type: Public
- Established: 1992; 34 years ago
- Parent institution: Sakarya University
- Dean: İrfan Haşlak
- Academic staff: 81 full-time faculty members and approximately 45 research assistants
- Students: Approximately 7200 undergraduate students and approximately 200 graduate students
- Location: Serdivan, Sakarya, Turkey
- Website: https://sbf.sakarya.edu.tr

The Faculty of Political Sciences at Sakarya University (Turkish: Siyasal Bilgiler Fakültesi, also known as SAU SBF) is one of the sixteen faculties that comprise Sakarya University. Originally established as Faculty of Economics and Administrative Sciences in 1992, it was named as the Faculty of Political Sciences by Decree No. 28988 on 2 May 2014. The faculty spans a range of "discipline areas" and includes Political Science and Public Administration, International Relations, Economics, Labor Economics and Industrial Relations, Public Finance, and Financial Econometrics. The SAU SBF has more than 80 full-time faculty and more than 40 research assistants.

== History ==
The Faculty of Political Sciences at Sakarya University was originally established as Faculty of Economic and Administrative Sciences by Decree No. 3837 on 11 July 1992.

During 1993-1996, Sabahattin Zaim (1926-2007) served as the first and founding dean of the faculty. As an active member of conservative İlim Yayma Cemiyeti (lit. Society to Disseminate Science), Zaim put his stamp on the faculty. Some academics served in the faculty during Zaim's period would become the leading figures of conservative and Islamic parties in Turkey. Although it is believed that Zaim invited Abdullah Gül, the 11th President of Turkey, to the faculty, official documents of Sakarya University proves it wrong. Gül actually served in Sakarya University between 1977 and 1983, long before the establishment of the faculty. Although Gül was assistant of Sabahattin Zaim, it seems that he has never been in the Faculty of Economic and Administrative Sciences. On the other hand, Zaim's another assistant Sami Güçlü took an active role in the development of the faculty. Güçlü would be the Minister of Agriculture and Rural Affairs in Justice and Development Party government. However, Zaim's influence on the faculty ended after 1997 Turkish military memorandum in Turkey and many professors, who were close to Zaim, left from the faculty.

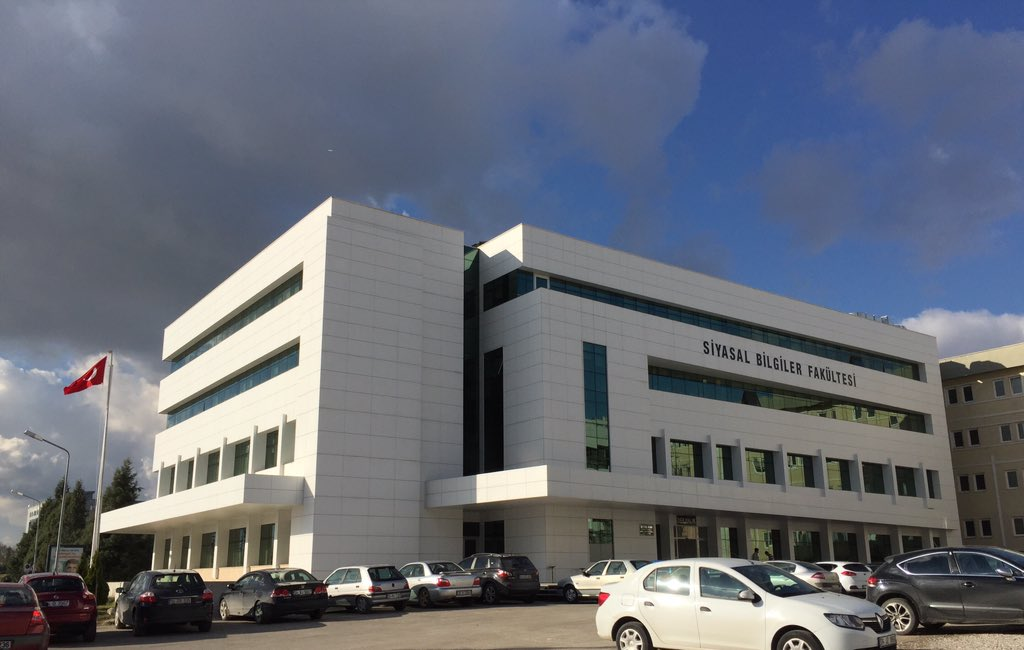
SAU Faculty of Political Sciences

The current building of the faculty was constructed in 1998 but it was devastatingly affected by the 1999 İzmit earthquake. One of its staff, Seydi Önder, lost his life during earthquake. Although the faculty moved to prefabs for a while, consecutive earthquakes interrupted education. During the winter semester of 1999-2000 academic year, the faculty suspended its education. The faculty restarted its regular education on 28 February 2000.

== Departments ==
When Faculty of Economic and Administrative Sciences inaugurated its education in 1992, it was hosting two departments, Economics, and Management. The department of Labor Economics and Industrial Relations, the department of Public Administration (later Political Science and Public Administration), and the department of International Relations were established between 1994 and 1996. While the department of Public Finance was established in 2002, the department of Financial Econometrics inaugurated its education in 2008. In November 2010, three departments, Management, Tourism Management, and Human Resources Management left from the faculty and they were transferred to the newly established Faculty of Management. Under the SAU SBF, the existing departments are as the followings:

- Political Science and Public Administration
- International Relations
- Economics
- Labor Economics and Industrial Relations
- Public Finance
- Financial Econometrics
- Islamic Economics and Finance

== Research centers ==
The SAU SBF hosted a variety of research centers but some of them were either closed or restructured as institutes. For example, the Center for Middle Eastern Studies was established by the faculty's professors but later it was restructured as an institute under the name Sakarya University Middle East Institute. The SAU SBF currently hosts three research centers.

- Center for European Union Research and Documentation (Turkish: Avrupa Birliği Araştırma Dokümantasyon Birimi)
- Sakarya Economic and Social Research Center (Turkish: Sakarya Ekonomik ve Sosyal Araştırmalar Merkezi)
- Research and Practice Center for Diaspora Studies (Turkish: Diaspora Çalışmaları Uygulama ve Araştırma Merkezi)

== Notable people ==
=== Deans ===
- 1993-1996 Sabahattin Zaim
- 1996-1999 Bilal Eryılmaz
- 1999-2000 İsmail Dalay
- 2000-2002 Ercan Akyiğit
- 2003-2010 Engin Yıldırım
- 2010-2013 Salih Şimşek
- 2013-2015 Kemal Inat
- 2015-2021 Hamza Al
- 2021-2024 Mustafa Çalışır
- 2024-present İrfan Haşlak

=== Faculty ===
- İbrahim Erol Kozak, professor of law
- Engin Yıldırım, the vice-president of Constitutional Court of Turkey
- Ömer İnan, vice-rector of Istanbul Sabahattin Zaim University
- Ömer Anayurt, the chairperson of the Council of Higher Education
- Sami Güçlü, former Minister of Agriculture and Rural Affairs
- Davut Dursun, former executive of Radio and Television Supreme Council
- Burhanettin Duran, president of the Directorate of Communications
- Bilal Eryilmaz, former chair of Council of Ethics for Public Officials in Turkey
