= Kemal Inat =

Turkish academic

- Born: 1971 (age 54–55); Sakarya, Turkey
- Citizenship: Turkish
- Education: Ankara University, University of Siegen
- Known for: Turkey-Middle East Relations
- Scientific career
- Fields: International Relations and Middle East
- Workplaces: Sakarya University,

Kemal Inat is a professor of Turkish Foreign Policy and Middle East Politics in the Department of International Relations at Sakarya University. Inat is founding director of Sakarya University Middle East Institute and former head of Department of International Relations, Sakarya University. He also served in SETA (Foundation for Political, Economic and Social Research) as Energy Research Director between 2019 and 2022.

== Early years ==
Kemal Inat was born in Hendek, Sakarya. He received his BA in International Relations from Ankara University in 1992 and his MA from University of Siegen in Germany in 1997. He completed his graduate education in Germany, earning his PhD in 2000 from Universität Gesamthochschule Siegen. His doctoral dissertation, titled “Türkische Nahostpolitik am Anfang des 21. Jahrhunderts” (Turkey’s Middle East Policy at the Dawn of the Twenty-First Century), examined the evolving dynamics of Turkish foreign policy toward the Middle East.

== Sakarya University ==
İnat has been a faculty member in the Department of International Relations, Sakarya University, since 1997. He was appointed Assistant Professor in 2001, promoted to Associate Professor in 2006, and attained the rank of Full Professor in 2011, all within the same department. Over the course of his academic career, İnat has held several key administrative positions at Sakarya University, including department chair, dean, and institute director. From 2010 to 2013, he served as Director of the Institute of Social Sciences, and in 2014, he briefly held the position of Dean of the Faculty of Economic and Administrative Sciences. He also chaired the Department of International Relations on two separate occasions, first from 2013 to 2016 and later from 2018 to 2022. In addition, İnat was the founding director of the Sakarya University Middle East Institute, a role he held from 2013 to 2017.

== Academic Studies ==
Inat has published numerous articles on Middle East politics and Turkish foreign policy in Turkish. Inat is the editor and the main contributor of "Ortadoğu Yıllığı" (The Middle East Yearbook) published since 2005. Despite encountering numerous changes in publication houses over more than 20 years, including early volumes published by Nobel Akademik Yayıncılık (2005–2006), subsequent series with Küre Yayınları (2007–2009), Açılım Kitap (2010s), Kadim Yayınları (mid-2010s) and most recently Ortadoğu Yayınları (2020s), "Ortadoğu Yıllığı" has endured as one of the longest-serving annual publications in Turkey. Inat is also the editor of Türk Dış Politikası Yıllığı (Turkish Foreign Policy Annual) published since 2009 by SETA Publication. Added to these two annual, Inat's academic articles have been published in national and international peer-reviewed journals. These journals include Insight Turkey, Khazar Journal of Humanities and Social Sciences, Finanspolitik & Ekonomik Yorumlar, Bilgi and Demokrasi Platformu. He currently teaches as a professor on Middle East politics, Turkish foreign policy and international conflicts.

Inat has also led a research project supported by the Scientific and Technological Research Council of Türkiye (TÜBİTAK). The project, titled “Türkiye–İran İlişkilerinde Yazılı Kaynakların Yeri (1979–2015)” (The Role of Written Sources in Turkey–Iran Relations, 1979–2015), examined the production, circulation, and influence of written materials—such as official documents, memoirs, and academic works—in shaping bilateral relations between Turkey and Iran in the post-1979 period.

Inat has supervised a large number of doctoral dissertations in the field of International Relations, many of whose authors have gone on to pursue academic careers at Turkish universities. Among his former PhD students, Furkan Polat and Mustafa Şehmus Küpeli currently serve as faculty members at Bursa Technical University, while Abdullah Erboğa is affiliated with the National Defense University. Filiz Cicioğlu and Yıldırım Turan hold academic positions in the Department of International Relations at Sakarya University. Several other doctoral graduates under his supervision are members of the Middle East Institute at Sakarya University, where they contribute to research and graduate training on regional politics, security, and foreign policy.

His political commentaries appeared in Turkish dailies such as Star, and Sabah.

== Views ==
Inat is known as a public and academic supporter of an EU-like supranational organization for the Middle East led by Turkey and Iran. He likens cooperation between Turkey and Iran to the cooperation between Germany and France, resulted in the establishment of European Union. According to Inat, only such an organization in the Middle East can end conflicts and wars among the states in the region as the EU did after the Second World War. In particular, İnat provocatively asks whether the Middle East must endure a catastrophe on the scale of World War II to arrive at the cooperative peace Europe achieved. He highlights that despite recent polarizing trends, Europe learned from its devastating religious wars, built preventive mechanisms, and institutionalized regular dialogue to de-escalate tensions. This, he suggests, is a lesson the Middle East has to internalize.

İnat’s views resonate with liberal institutionalist theories, particularly those emphasizing the pacifying effects of economic interdependence and institutional binding. In line with the functionalist tradition of regional integration theorists such as David Mitrany and Ernst Haas, İnat sees economic cooperation as the necessary first step toward broader political integration. Economic Cooperation Organization, of which both Turkey and Iran are founding members, appears in his framework as a proto-institution through which economic ties can be deepened. However, İnat maintains that the current level of trade—peaking at $16 billion in 2011—is insufficient to produce the kind of mutual interdependence that could underpin supranational integration.

Inat’s regional vision also aligns with the thinking of scholars who criticize external (especially Western) interventions as destabilizing, instead advocating for the emergence of endogenous regional orders. Similar to Barry Buzan and Ole Wæver’s concept of Regional Security Complexes, İnat asserts that the resolution of Middle Eastern conflicts must come from within the region. He argues that only regional powers with sufficient economic and strategic capacity can stabilize their environment. Yet, in his view, no single Middle Eastern country currently fulfills the criteria of a regional hegemon. For İnat, the only viable path toward regional order is the joint leadership of Turkey and Iran, contingent upon their ability to forge economic interdependence and institutional cooperation.

== Selected publications ==
1. Dünya Çatışmaları, 2 Volumes, (with Burhanettin Duran and Muhittin Ataman) (Ankara: Nobel Yayınları, 2010) (in Turkish)

2. Foreign Policy in the Greater Middle East: Central Middle Eastern Countries, (with Wolfgang Gieler) (Berlin: WVB-Wissenschaftlicher Verlag Berlin, 2005)

3. “Türkische Aussenpolitik zwischen Europa und Amerika”, Blätter für deutsche und internationale Politik, Oktober 2005: 1237-1241

4. "Alman Dış Politikası’nın Temel Belirleyicileri: Tarih, Ekonomi ve Güvenlik", Finanspolitik ve Ekonomik Yorumlar, 48(556), 2011: 45-55.

5. "Economic Relations between Turkey and Germany", Insight Turkey, Vol. 18, No. 1, 2016, pp. 21–35.
