= Sakarya University =

Public research university in Serdivan, Sakarya Province, Turkey

Coordinates: 40.7408°N 30.3333°E

- Sakarya Üniversitesi
- Type: Public
- Established: 1970 as Sakarya State Academy of Engineering and Architecture
- Academic affiliations: EUA, IAU
- President: Hamza Al
- Vice-president: Emrah Doğan; Özer Köseoğlu; Özer Uygun
- Students: 80,974
- Location: Serdivan, Sakarya Province, Turkey
- Campus: Esentepe Campus, 54187 / Sakarya
- Colors: Cardinal blue White
- Sporting affiliations: TBSF; Sakarya Tatankaları(American football)
- Website: sakarya.edu.tr

University rankings

Regional – Overall
- QS Emerging Europe and Central Asia: 221-230 (2022)

Sakarya University (Turkish: Sakarya Üniversitesi), frequently referred to simply as SAU, is a public research university located in the city of Serdivan, Sakarya.

Considered one of the largest universities in Turkey with more than 85,000 students, Sakarya University has very high research activity and its comprehensive graduate program offers doctoral degrees in Science, Technology, Engineering, and Humanities, as well as professional degrees in business, medicine, law, nursing, social work and dentistry. It hosts five different institutes: Educational Sciences, Natural Sciences, Health Sciences, Social Sciences, and Middle East Institute.

In Turkey, Sakarya University is the first and only public university receiving the ISO-2002 Quality Certificate and "the EFQM Excellence Quality Certificate of Competency Level".

== History ==
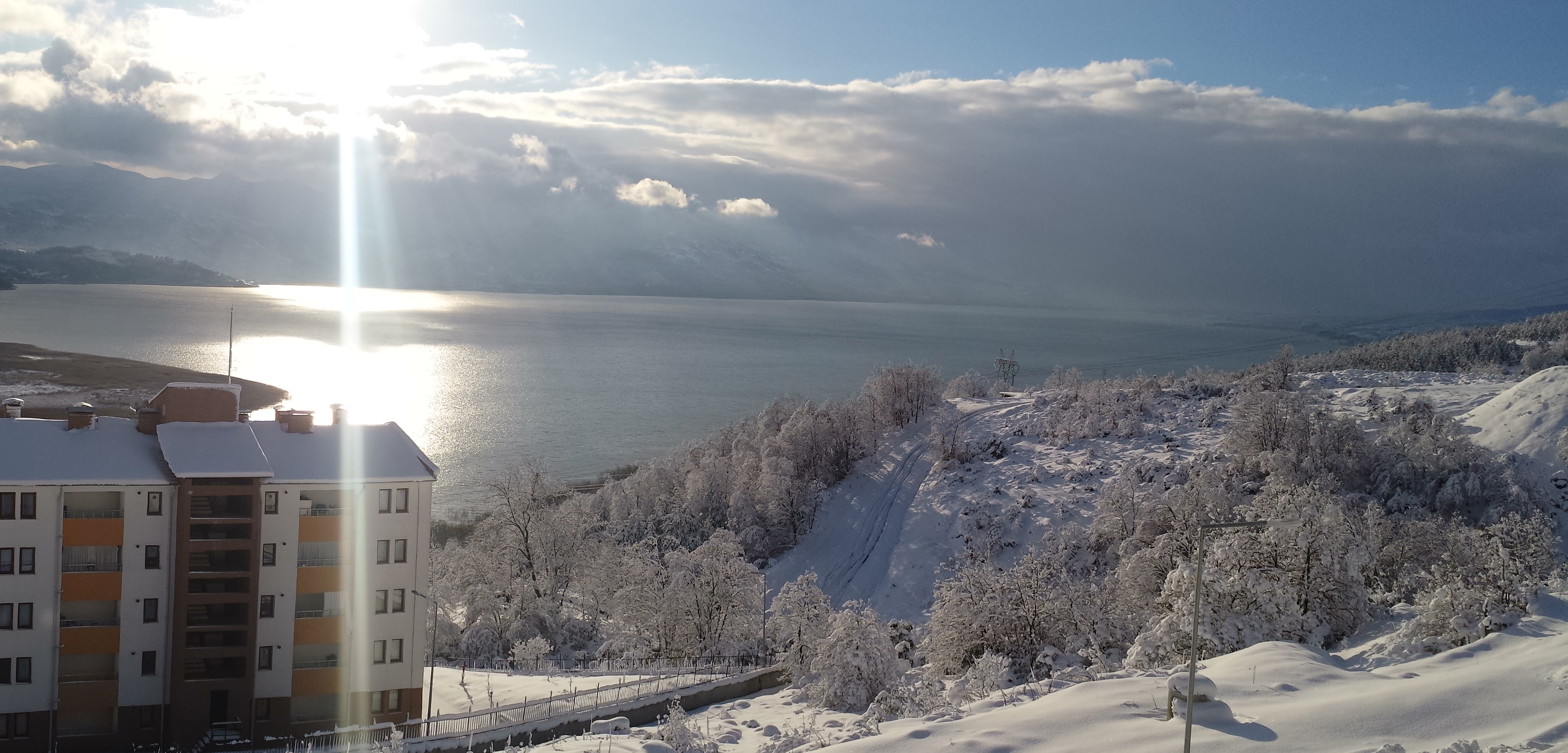
Campus view during the winter

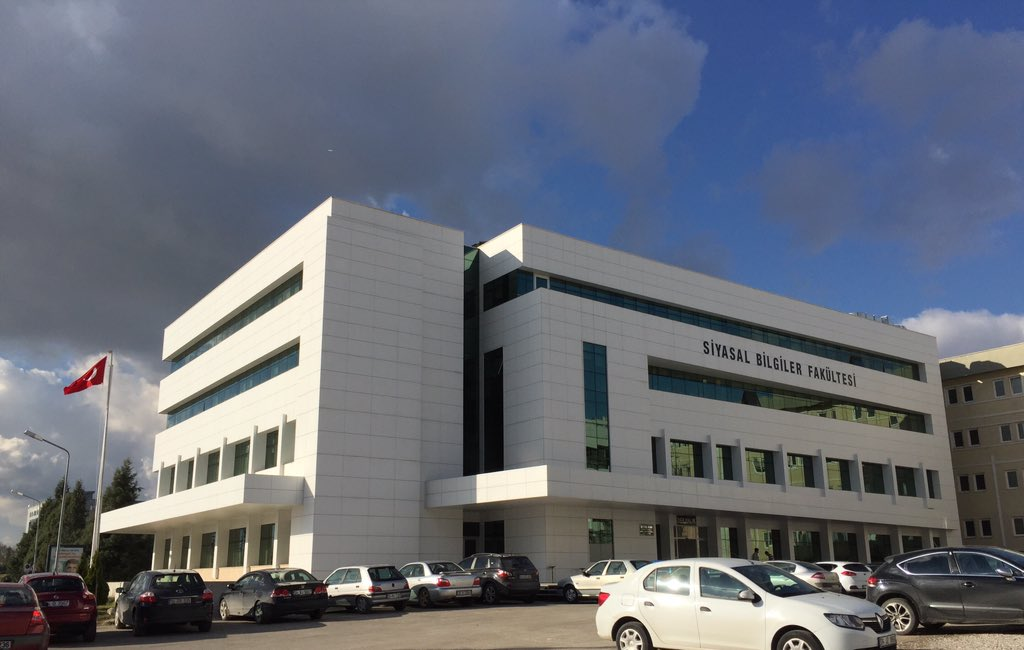
Sakarya University, Faculty of Political Sciences

Sakarya University traces its origins back to the establishment of the School of Engineering and Architecture in 1970, initially affiliated with Istanbul Technical University. In 1971, this institution was restructured as the Sakarya State Academy of Engineering and Architecture. By 1982, it was reorganized as a faculty within İTÜ and began offering Master of Science and Doctor of Philosophy programs, administered by the İTÜ Institute of Pure and Applied Sciences. During the same period, vocational schools in Sakarya and Düzce were integrated into its structure. Efforts to elevate the institution to university status date back to the 1970s, with Sakarya Deputy Hayrettin Uysal introducing a parliamentary bill to establish a university named "Sakarya University." Despite its inclusion in the legislative agenda, the proposal did not succeed at the time.

In 1992, Sakarya University was officially established through Law No. 3837, enacted on July 3. Concurrently, the Düzce Vocational School was detached and affiliated with Abant İzzet Baysal University. Early discussions regarding the university's name included a proposal to honor Fevzi Çakmak, a prominent military leader and statesman, by naming the institution "Fevzi Çakmak University." However, this suggestion was not adopted, and the university was ultimately named after the Sakarya region. In November 1992, Ramazan Evren, a professor from İTÜ's Department of Industrial Engineering, was appointed as the founding rector.

In May 1993, a tragic accident involving a Sakarya University bus claimed the lives of 17 individuals, leaving the university and its community in deep sorrow. The bus, carrying students from the Faculty of Engineering and Architecture on a trip to Bodrum, collided with a truck on the Karacabey-Bursa highway. Among the victims were several students and young individuals, whose untimely deaths left an indelible mark on the institution. Later, another devastating event deeply impacted Sakarya University. During the Marmara Earthquake in 1999, which struck the region, the university lost three faculty members and three administrative staff. The faculty members who died were Dr. Eyüp Sabri Türker from the Faculty of Science and Letters Mathematics Department, Zuhal Öztürk from the Social Sciences Institute, and Sevda Pekak from the Faculty of Theology.

== Research ==
In 2023, Sakarya University was selected by the Council of Higher Education (YÖK) for the Research Universities Candidate Monitoring Program.

Sakarya University faculties received Scientific and Technological Research Council of Turkey and Turkish Academy of Sciences (TÜBA) research awards. Notably, four faculty members, Ali Balcı (2019), Ozan Yılmaz (2019), Gamze Güney Eskiler (2022), and Tuğrul Çetinkaya (2024), were recipients of the TÜBA-GEBİP Awards, reflecting the university's contributions to cutting-edge research and innovation. Additionally, Mahmut Özaçar received a TÜBİTAK Incentive Award in 2010, and Yalçın Solak, while a member of the Faculty of Medicine, received the BAGEP Award in 2016.

== Rankings ==
The Times Higher Education World University Rankings ranked Sakarya University as follows:

Year	Rank	Overall	Teaching	Research	Citations	Industry Income	International Outlook
2021	1001+	10.3–25.0	14	9	17.6	35.1	20.9
2022	1201+	10.6–22.3	16	9.8	30.4	40.7	22.2
2023	1001–1200	24.4–29.7	21.2	11.3	46.2	54.2	27.3
2024	1201–1500	22.8–28.2	16.5	10.6	45.4	24	28.4
2025	1500+	10.5–25.1	16.1	10.9	45.9	27.5	30.9

The University Ranking by Academic Performance (URAP) ranked Sakarya University among Turkish universities as follows:

Year	Rank	Research Score	Citation Score	Total Score
2020	34	112.47	121.98	525
2021	26	115.46	125.01	559
2022	33	99.98	128.37	529.29
2023	28	121	134	789
2024	30	133.79	138.84	796.6
2025	28	133.37	139.73	722.19

== List of faculties ==
- Faculty of Engineering

It is the first and founding faculty of Sakarya University. Originally established as “Sakarya School of Engineering and Architecture” in 1970, the school was named as “Sakarya Faculty of Engineering” in 1992. It includes eight different departments, Mechanical Engineering, Civil Engineering, Electrical Electronics Engineering, Industrial Engineering, Metallurgical and Materials Engineering, Environmental Engineering, Geophysical Engineering, and Food Engineering.

- Faculty of Computer and Information Sciences
- Faculty of Business
- Faculty of Education

Established in 1997, the Faculty of Education sustains its academic activity in Hendek Campus. It is the largest faculty locating outside of the main campus.

- Faculty of Political Sciences

Originally established as Faculty of Economic and Administrative Sciences in July 1992, the faculty was reorganized under the name Faculty of Political Sciences in May 2014 including five different departments, Political Science and Public Administration, International Relations, Economics, Labor Economics and Industrial Relations, Public Finance, and Financial Econometrics.

- Faculty of Technical Education
- Faculty of Medicine
- Faculty of Arts and Sciences
- Faculty of Fine Arts

Established in 1997, the faculty hosts three departments as Painting, Ceramics and Traditional Turkish Handicrafts.

- Faculty of Dentistry
- Faculty of Law
- Faculty of Theology

Established in 1992, it is located outside of the main campus. With its more than 80 academic staff, Faculty Of Theology provides undergraduate and graduate education to around 3500 students.

- Faculty of Communication

Established in 2012, it hosts four departments, Public Relations and Advertising, Journalism, Radio-Television and Cinema and Communication Sciences.

- Faculty of Management
- Faculty of Sport Sciences
- Faculty of Technology

The Faculty of Technology has opened its door to the students since the academic year 2010-2011 and there are currently five engineering departments in the faculty: Civil Engineering, Electrical and Electronics Engineering, Mechanical Engineering, Mechatronics Engineering, Metallurgical and Materials Engineering. The education and teaching methods of the Faculty of Technology differ from other faculties. The faculty practices 7+1 educational model which is based on university-industry collaboration. One of the purposes of this model is to help its undergraduate students to become as an engineer with good practical skills. In this model students take theoretical and applied courses and before graduation students have a chance to practice their theoretical knowledge in the related field of the industry. For this purpose the curriculum is set as: Theoretical and applied courses for 7 semesters, application in the industrial corporations for 1 semester.

- Faculty of Tourism

== Sakarya University Library ==
Sakarya University Library comprises nearly 10 individual libraries. Of them, the Suleyman Demirel Library is the largest single library in the Sakarya University Library System, and is one of the largest buildings on the campus. In 1995, the Suleyman Demirel Library moved into its current building, which covers a 7000 m2 section and it is located in an area of 5000 m2. In 2014, an additional building was opened, containing many study spaces, and reading rooms.

The Sakarya University Library, together with faculty libraries and vocational school libraries, have more than 710,000 pieces of information source (more than 700,000 books, 7.620 thesis papers, 3.717 CDs and DVDs) and 1.766 printed journals in total. In the classification of the books and journals, Dewey Classification System is utilized. It is also possible to use inter library loan facility when required. Through electronic database subscriptions, a through electronic access to numerous books and journals, and two-century-old archive of renowned journal, “Time”, has also been made possible to users.

Sakarya University hosts also Ibn-i Haldun Library located at the building of the Middle East Institute. Hosting books mostly on Middle Eastern politics, society and culture, this library provides basic materials for graduate student and academic researchers. Added to this Middle East-focused library, libraries in the Faculty of Theology and Faculty of Education host area-focused reading materials.

== Middle East Institute ==
Sakarya University
- Abbreviation: ORMER
- Established: 2013
- Type: Public
- Location: Sakarya, Turkey
- Director: Tuncay Kardaş
- Affiliations: Sakarya University; MESC Jordan
- Staff: 10 full-time faculty members and 18 research assistants
- Website: http://ormer.sakarya.edu.tr/ ORMER Website]

Sakarya University Middle East Institute (Turkish: Sakarya Üniversitesi Ortadoğu Enstitüsü, also known as ORMER) is located on the campus of the university. The idea of Sakarya University Middle East Institute goes back to the year 2005 when the first issue of Middle East Annual (Ortadoğu Yıllığı) was published by a group of academics including the founding director of the institute, Kemal Inat. In the aftermath of the Arab Spring, this idea turned a concrete step with the opening of a master program on the Middle East under the Social Science Institute of the university in May 2012. At the same year, an online master program on the Middle East was also inaugurated. Those who opened Master-level programs organized the first Middle East Congress on Politics and Society between 9 and 11 October 2012.

After the opening of another Middle East program at PhD level, the Center for Middle Eastern Studies at Sakarya University was established on 11 December 2013. The main focus of the center was the effect of the Arab Spring on politics, society and economy of the Middle East. Accordingly, the second Middle East Congress on Politics and Society was organized in order to deal with effects of the Arab Spring on the Middle East.

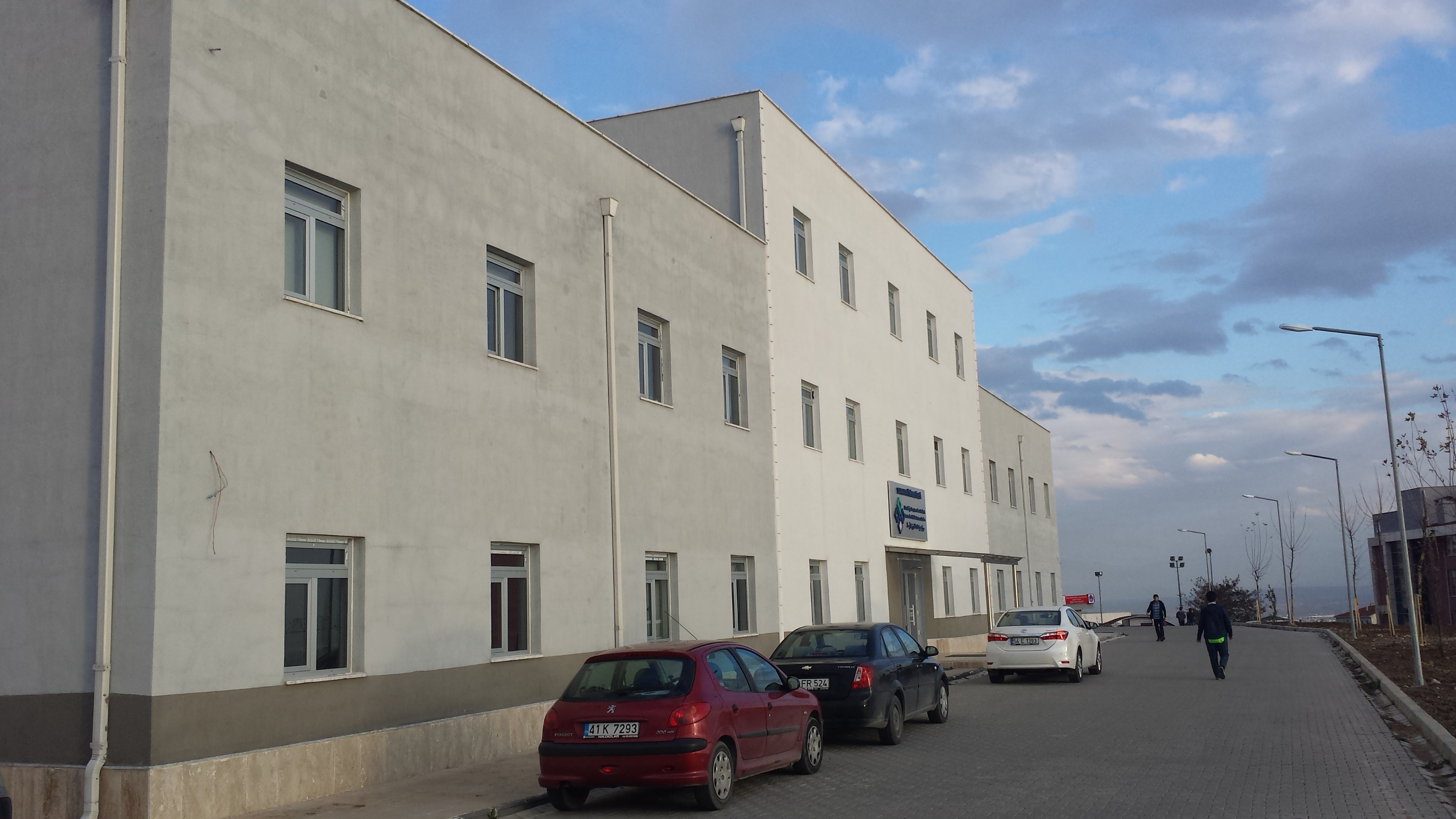
Building of Middle East Institute

According to founding director of the institute, Turkey's need for academically-educated experts on the Middle East became a problem especially after two important political developments in the opening years of the 21st Century, rising interest of Turkey towards the Middle East region, and political turmoil following the Arab Spring. Motivated by these political developments, the center reorganized itself as an institute. Therefore, Sakarya University Middle East Institute was officially established on May 25, 2015, and all graduate programs and staff were transferred to this institute. However, the institute continues to use ORMER as its abbreviation. ORMER is a shortened form of Ortadoğu Merkezi (Middle East Center).

=== Activities ===
As part of its mission, Sakarya University Middle East Institute offers a variety of opportunities including conferences, lecture series, workshops, and outreach activities. The institute also publishes booklets, detailed reports, policy briefs, and short commentaries on current affairs of the Middle East.

The main activity of the institute is to organize Middle East Congress on Politics and Society biennially. Prior to the establishment of the institute, this congress was organized firstly by Department of International Relations, Sakarya University in 2012. The second Middle East Congress on Politics and Society was organized by the Center for Middle Eastern Studies at the university in 2014.

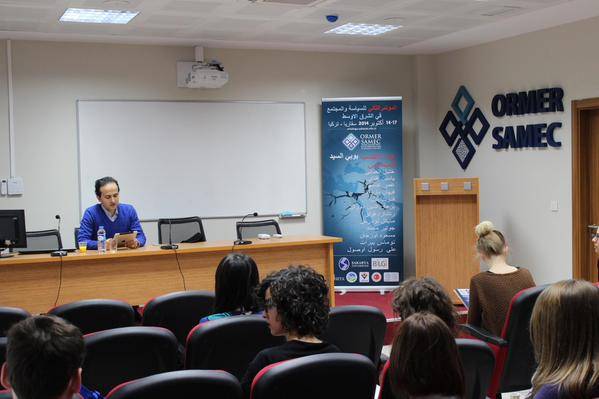
The Jerusalem Hall in Middle East Institute Building

=== Periodicals ===
In addition to policy briefs, and short commentaries published in its web page on occasion, Sakarya University Middle East Institute is the editorial home to a peer-review academic journal and a peer-review academic annual, both of which focus particularly on the Middle East.

The Middle East Annual, (Turkish: Ortadoğu Yıllığı), published since 2005, covers political, economic and societal developments in each country of the Middle East.

Turkish Journal of Middle Eastern Studies (Turkish: Türkiye Ortadoğu Çalışmaları Dergisi), published since 2014, is a peer-review academic journal.

=== Current staff ===
- Director: Tuncay Kardas
- Deputy Director: Yıldırım Turan and Nebi Miş
- Graduate Program Coordinator: Recep Tayyip Gurler

=== Previous directors ===
- Kemal Inat (2015 – September 2018)

== Notable former faculty ==
- Malik Beyleroğlu — Silver medalist at the 1996 Summer Olympics
- Abdullah Gül — 11th President of Turkey
- Engin Yıldırım — Member of Constitutional Court of Turkey
- Norman Finkelstein — American political scientist, author of The Holocaust Industry
- Sami Güçlü — Former Minister of Agriculture and Rural Affairs of Turkey
- Burhanettin Duran — Deputy Foreign Affairs Minister of Turkey
- Saida Sherif — Broadcaster, educationalist, humanitarian and poet
