= Yaşar Kaya =

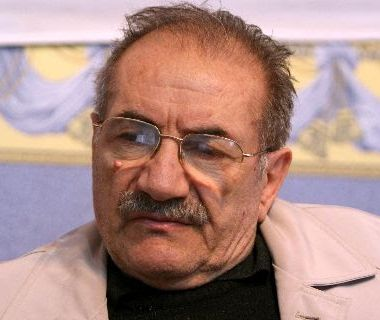

Chairman of the Peoples' Labour Party
- In office June 1993 – December 1993

President of the Kurdish Parliament in Exile
- In office 1995–1999

Personal details
- Born: 1938 Kars, Turkey
- Died: 9 March 2016 (aged 77–78) Erbil, Iraqi Kurdistan
- Citizenship: Turkish
- Party: Peoples Labour Party

Yaşar Kaya (born 1938, Kars, Turkey–2016, Erbil, Iraqi Kurdistan) was a Kurdish politician and publisher of the pro-Kurdish newspaper Özgür Gündem from Turkey. Together with authors like Ismail Besikçi and Musa Anter, he was a co-founders of the Kurdish Institute of Istanbul in 1992.

== Early life ==
He attended the Kabatas high school in Istanbul and after studied economics at the university. He was arrested and prosecuted in the trial of the forty-niners in 1959, and completed his studies in 1965. Following he was shortly exiled to Konya in 1968 but soon returned to Istanbul where he was employed by several companies. He also wrote for the newspaper Dicle-Firat, an outlet which focused on the assimilation of Kurds and Kurdish rights between 1962 and 1963. He was prosecuted in relation of his activities as the owner of Özgür Gündem, and in January 1993, he had to announce the closure of the newspaper.

== Political career ==
He was elected the first party chair of the Democracy Party (DEP) in June 1993. The party decided to launch a peace campaign focused on the Turkish Kurdish conflict which would take place from the 2 August to the 1 September 1993. The campaign was prohibited by the Turkish authorities and the events that have been planned in Diyarbakır and Batman were canceled. And on the 17 September 1993 Kaya was arrested due to his participation at public event in Germany as well at the congress of the Kurdistan Democratic Party (KDP) in 1993. In October 1993 he was condemned to two years imprisonment, but was released on the 8 December of the same year. On the 12 December 1993 Hatip Dicle was elected the new chairman. In February 1994, Kaya was sentenced to 4 years in prison due to a speech he held at the KDP congress on the 15 August 1993 in Iraq.

=== In exile in Europe ===
He fled into exile declaring he has been in over 18 different prisons in the last 37 years. He eventually settled Cologne, Germany. In Europe, he was involved in the foundation of the Kurdish Parliament in Exile in April 1995 in The Hague, Netherlands. He was elected its president and several ex-deputies of the Turkish parliament from the Democracy Party (DEP), the Peoples Labour Party (HEP) as well as representatives of the political wing of the Kurdistan Workers' Party were represented in the parliament. Kaya was the president of the Kurdish Parliament in Exile until it was dissolved. Yasar Kaya kept being in the focus of the Turkish authorities and his statements of support for a Kurdish state created from parts of the countries Turkey, Syria, Iraq and Iran in Turkey during an interview to the Turkish newspaper Yeni Safak drew strong opposition by the Turkish authorities who confiscated the issue and the journalist Ali Teker was prosecuted for separatism for writing such an article. He also interviewed Abdullah Öcalan just ahead his expulsion from Syria and after Öcalan was sentenced to death by Turkey in June 1999, he criticized the verdict. In July 1999, the Turkish authorities issued an arrest warrant for Yasar Kaya, and accused him together with other integrants of the Kurdish Parliament in Exile of having established an armed movement.

== Return from exile and death ==
In 2014, he returned to Turkey after having received the assurance he would not be arrested. He had to stand trial though due to his involvement in the Kurdish Parliament in Exile. He left Turkey for Erbil to receive medical treatment after he fell ill in spring 2016. He died on the 9 March 2016 in Erbil.
