= Department of International Relations, Sakarya University =

International relations school of Sakarya University

- Type: Public; Graduate school
- Established: 1996
- Parent institution: Sakarya University
- Chair: Filiz Cicioğlu
- Faculty: 20
- Location: Sedivan, Sakarya, Turkey
- Website: www.uli.sakarya.edu.tr

The Department of International Relations at Sakarya University, located at the Esentepe campus, Serdivan, Sakarya, provides undergraduate and graduate education about international politics. As a department within Faculty of Political Sciences, it has an integrated curriculum with other departments of this faculty such as public administration, and economics. Established in 1997, the department of international relations has more than 4.000 alumni including business leaders, journalists, diplomats, district governors, and academics. The department has 14 full-time faculty and 6 research assistants.

== History ==
The Department of International Relations established in 1996 under the Faculty of Economics and Administrative Sciences. It admitted its first students during the academic year of 1997-1998. That year, the department accepted a total of 45 students and was ranked second to last among the 17 state universities admitting students to international relations programs. The department launched its master's program in 2000 and inaugurated its PhD program in 2007. At the same year, the department started to send its students to Europe and receive students from European universities as part of Erasmus Programme. The Department of International Relations has continued to evolve, adding online graduate programs such as International Relations and European Union and Middle Eastern Studies in 2012. When the Faculty of Political Science was established in 2015, the department moved to this new faculty.

The department also witnessed the rise of an influential student union, Blue Planet (Mavi Gezegen), established in 2000. Its core members launched the student-run journal Hariciye Kalemi (literally Foreign Affairs Pen, but in Ottoman usage meaning Foreign Affairs Office) between 2001 and 2006, with future scholars Nebi Miş and Murat Yeşiltaş serving as editors during their undergraduate years. The journal featured a wide range of content, including opinion pieces by invited academics such as Davut Dursun and Alaeddin Yalçınkaya, interviews with prominent figures from various institutions, and critical book reviews.

According to a study, the department is ranked among the top 25 international relations departments in Turkey based on academic research and recognition. Together with its sister institution, the Middle East Institute, at the same university, the department focuses its research primarily on the Middle East. Notable former faculty members include Burhanettin Duran, Murat Yeşiltaş, and Emin Gürses.

== Academics ==
The Department of International Relations offers a standard graduate program with an option of a %30 English-language courses. Students can choose English-language equivalence of basic courses. The department also provides evening undergraduate education with same curriculum. In addition to graduate programs, the department offers MA, PhD and online graduate programs. A recent overview of admission quotas and departmental capacity in Turkish international relations programs indicates that the Department of International Relations at Sakarya University has maintained a relatively stable number of full-time faculty members since 2019. Based on the available data, the estimated student–faculty ratio has ranged between 40 and 51 students per full-time faculty member.

Year	Total Faculty	Professors	Associate Professors	Assistant Professors	Annual Newcomers	Total Enrollment	Student–Faculty Ratio
2019	13	3	2	8	170	602	46.3
2021	15	4	2	9	170	610	40.7
2023	15	4	4	7	170	694	46.3
2025	14	4	7	3	50	-	—

In addition to conducting numerous TÜBİTAK-funded research projects, the department currently hosts a Jean Monnet Chair. The Chair has been active between 2024 and 2027 and focuses on Turkey–EU relations in the context of global power change and shifting international order. As part of this program, the department hosted some leading scholars such as Emel Parlar Dal and Seçkin Köstem as guest lecturers.

== Former Heads of Department ==
- Alaeddin Yalçınkaya, 1996-2000 (founding chair)
- İsmail Özbay
- İbrahim Kamil, 2003-2003
- Hasan Gürak, 2003-2004
- Burhanettin Duran, 2004-2009
- Alaeddin Yalçınkaya, 2009-2011
- Ertan Efegil, 2011-2014
- Ali Balcı, 2014-2014
- Kemal Inat, 2014-2016
- Ali Balcı, 2016-2018
- Nesrin Kenar, 2018-2020
- Kemal Inat, 2020-2024
- Filiz Cicioğlu, 2024-

== Notable alumni ==
- Murat Yeşiltaş, member of the TRT Governing Board
- Adem Mavrić, member of the Student List in Serbia
