= Fahrettin Altun =

Turkish politician (born 1976)

Presidential Spokesperson - President of the Directorate of Communications
- In office 25 July 2018 – 10 July 2025
- President: Recep Tayyip Erdoğan
- Preceded by: Office established
- Succeeded by: Burhanettin Duran

Personal details
- Born: 11 September 1976 (age 49) Stuttgart, Germany
- Spouse: Fatmanur Altun
- Education: Istanbul University
- Website: iletisim.gov.tr/english/baskan

Fahrettin Altun (born 11 September 1976, Stuttgart, Germany) is a Turkish politician, researcher, academic, who served as the head of media and communications in the Turkish presidency from 2018 to 2025.

== Education and early life ==
Altun studied Istanbul University Department of Sociology, graduating in 1998. Altun attended the Department of Political Sciences of the University of Utah as a visiting researcher between 2002 and 2003. He then studied at Mimar Sinan University and received his PhD from Istanbul University in 2006. His doctoral thesis was titled “A Comparative Analysis of Media Theories of McLuhan and Baudrillard”. He also served as the General Coordinator of the Turkish government think tank Foundation for Political, Economic and Social Research (SETA).

== Professional career ==
He was Head of the Department of Communication at Istanbul Şehir University from 2008 to 2014 and was then a faculty member at Istanbul Medeniyet University from 2015 to 2017. He is also an author, columnist and former TV presenter. Altun was chief editor of the magazine Kriter, and appeared as a commentator on TRT, a state owned television channel. He has written for Sabah, Daily Sabah and Akşam, and worked as an editor for Yöneliş and Küre publishing houses. He has written also for world media outlets such as Al Jazeera, The Washington Post, Foreign Policy, Middle East Eye, The Washington Times.

== Political career ==
Altun has risen to prominence within the Тurkish government quickly since leaving academia. According to Ahval, "Erdoğan frequently chooses Altun over his own spokesman İbrahim Kalın to make critical statements and manage his social media output, the former academic is seen as the top man in the Presidency."

Altun strongly criticized French President Emmanuel Macron over his remarks on 'separatist Islam', following terrorist attacks in France. Altun said the remarks were "yet another example of a desperate European politician vying for relevance". Altun also said that European attitudes towards Muslims were reminiscent of the "demonization of the European Jewry in the 1920s." Following a raid on the pro-Kurdish Peoples' Democratic Party (HDP) office in Esenyurt, he equated the HDP with the Kurdistan Workers' Party (PKK). On August 2, 2024, Turkey blocked access to Instagram, following comments from Turkish communications director Fahrettin Altun who condemned Meta Platforms for removing Instagram posts offering condolences or expressing sadness following the assassination of Hamas political leader Ismail Haniyeh. However, there is no evidence Altun was involved in this decision. The ban was issued by BTK (Information Technologies Institution) that takes orders from the Ministry of Transportation, not the Directorate of Communications.

== Views ==
On April 24, 2021, Fahrettin Altun delivered a speech at an event honouring Turkish diplomats who were assassinated by the Armenian Secret Army for the Liberation of Armenia (ASALA) in the 1970s and 1980s. Following the removal of the video of his speech by YouTube, Altun publicly criticized the platform, accusing it of hypocrisy. He argued that YouTube overlooks hate speech against Islam and Muslims but deemed his comments about the terrorists responsible for the diplomats' deaths as hate speech. Altun used the incident to highlight the need for indigenous and national media platforms, asserting that terrorism transcends language, religion, and race.

Following Erdoğan’s remarks suggesting a potential military response against Israel, the Foreign Affairs Minister Israel Katz, implied on X that the Turkish President is following the path of Saddam Hussein. On July 29, 2024, Altun accused the Israeli government of attempting to obscure its alleged war crimes by targeting Erdoğan. Altun added, "There is not a single thing that our president or country can learn from bloody genocidal murderers like you."

Altun highlighted the strategic importance of Turkey in NATO, describing it as a crucial land bridge between East and West. He argued that Turkey’s commitment to NATO has long safeguarded Europe and is vital for the continent’s security. He also noted that NATO must acknowledge the national priorities of its member states to remain effective in the future. In an interview with Swedish Dagens Nyheter, he described Turkey as "A country that looks after its interests at any cost and demands equal relations."

Under Fahrettin Altun's term, the Directorate of Communications organized exhibitions and conferences as part of its activities to combat xenophobia. It also launched the "we remember" page, focusing on the Holocaust, the Bosnian War, the Rwandan Genocide, and the Cambodian Genocide, for internet users. Having described Islamophobia as "a crime against humanity", he advocated a global response to fight this form of discrimination. Regularly calling on European leaders "not to accept anti-Muslim racism and not to fulfil the demands of those on the extreme right-wing", Fahrettin Altun thinks the answer to it is to "show tolerance, respect, and understanding for everyone's religion, race, and culture." Marking Germany’s political sphere as "zero-sum game of political fears" in an article he penned in 2015, Altun pointed out that with its policies against far-right movements to prevent the rise of racist opponents, Germany is "only creating more space for racist politics."

In his book, Türkiye as a Stabilizing Power in an Age of Turmoil, Altun criticized the current international system, arguing that it has failed to maintain peace and security. He advocates for reform, particularly the expansion of the UN Security Council, and claims that Turkey’s humanitarian interventions provide a model for achieving relative stability. Altun reflects Turkey’s perception of the global system as being complicit in many of the conflicts and tensions around the world, and cites Turkey’s dual mission: "Tackling the symptoms of a broken system while also aiming to cure the disease itself." "If Turkey’s warnings about the UN’s structure had been heeded, the invasion of Ukraine by Russia and the displacement of millions could have been avoided."

According to Altun, Turkey has managed refugee waves from the Middle East with efficiency and humanitarian consideration, while some European countries have focused on security-first asylum policies. He draws a contrast between Europe, where "anti-immigration rhetoric is sometimes used for political gain", and Turkey, "where the leadership has consistently resisted such pressures". He also suggests that European nations could learn from Turkey’s long-term experience in handling refugee situations.

Known as an outspoken critic of data management by major social media platform companies, Fahrettin Altun slammed Instagram for preventing people posting messages of condolence over the assassination of Ismael Haniyeh, political leader of the Palestinian group Hamas. Fahrettin Altun has described the contemporary digital landscape as one characterized by "digital fascism" and "digital dictators."

== Public diplomacy ==
In a 2019 interview with Kriter magazine, Altun highlighted the importance of communication in modern governance, describing it as a necessity. Under his leadership, Turkey’s Directorate of Communications has adopted a new approach to public diplomacy. The institution has organized panels, forums, and exhibitions in cities worldwide. It also aims to foster a more relatable and accessible brand of the government. In 2024, Turkey ranked 18th in the Media and Communications pillar of the Global Soft Power Index, climbing 10 spots from the previous year. The report noted that nations seeking to enhance their soft power might benefit from focusing on international relations and cultural heritage, citing Turkey’s strategy as a reference point.

=== CİMER ===
CİMER, a platform for citizens to directly communicate their problems, requests, and reports to the Presidency, which became a major public forum after merging with BİMER following the dissolution of the Prime Ministry in 2018, reported a 350% growth in the number of applications under the leadership of Fahrettin Altun as Director of Communications. The number of applications increased from 2 million in 2017 to 7.65 million in 2023. The topics submitted range widely, including complaints about nepotism in local administrations, intra-family disputes, and dissatisfaction or contentment with the quality of public services.

CIMER was given the "Best Project" award in the category of "Access to information and knowledge" at the World Summit of Information Society (WSIS), a two phase UN-sponsored organization and "Golden World Awards for Excellence" in the category of "Public Relations" at the award ceremony of International Public Relations Association (IPRA).

=== Hello Turkiye Campaign ===
In 2021, under a presidential decree, the country’s official name on the global stage was changed from Turkey to Türkiye, with a media campaign spearheaded by the Directorate of Communications. The new name has since been recognized by many official international organizations.

== Publications ==
- Altun, F., Caglar, İ., & Yerlikaya, T. (2016). Press freedom in Turkey: Myths and truths. SETA.
- Altun, F. (2022). Türkiye as a stabilizing power in an age of turmoil. Academica Press.
