= Inat =

Inat, INAT, or iNat may refer to:

- iNaturalist, a biology-oriented citizen science project
- INAT, an Indian admissions test for doctoral students in astronomy and astrophysics (see List of admission tests to colleges and universities#India
- Institut National Agronomique de Tunisie (INAT), an agricultural university in Tunisia
- Kemal Inat (born 1971), Turkish political science professor
