= Talip Küçükcan =

Turkish diplomat

Talip Küçükcan MP

Member of the Grand National Assembly
- Incumbent
- Assumed office 7 June 2015
- Constituency: Adana (June 2015, Nov 2015)

Personal details
- Born: March 5, 1963 (age 63) Osmaniye, Turkey
- Party: Justice and Development Party (AKP)
- Education: Uludağ University
- Occupation: Diplomat
- Profession: Sociologist and Theologian

Talip Küçükcan (born in 1963) is Ambassador of Turkey to the Republic of Indonesia, Timor-Leste and Asean since April 2023. He is a Turkish professor of sociology and a former politician from the Justice and Development Party (AKP), who has served as a Member of Parliament for Adana since 7 June 2015 until 24 June 2018. He was head of the Turkish Delegation to and the Deputy President of the Parliamentary Assembly of the Council of Europe and member of Foreign Relations Committee at the Turkish Parliament between 2015 and 2017. Küçükcan served as the deputy chairman of Political and Legal Affairs of the Justice and Development Party until July 2016. He also served as member of the OSCE PA of the Turkish delegation.

== Personal life ==
Born in Osmaniye, Küçükcan graduated from Uludağ University Faculty of Theology in 1986, received an MA from the School of Oriental and African Studies, University of London, and a PhD in ethnic relations from the University of Warwick. He worked as a research fellow at the Centre for Research in Ethnic Relations at the University of Warwick between 1997 and 1999. Before moving to Marmara University Faculty of Theology, he was a senior research fellow at the Center for Islamic Studies in Istanbul until 2007. He served as a senior advisor to the President of Higher Education Council of Turkey between 2009 and 2013. He served as director of Institute for Middle East Studies at Marmara University between 2011 and 2014. He worked for SETA, foundation for political, economic and social research. He served as the editor in chief of Insight Turkey, a policy journal until 2015. He is appointed as the Personal Representative of the OSCE Chairperson-in-Office on Combating Intolerance and Discrimination against Muslims for 2014 and 2015. He was the President of the Union of Academicians and Writers of the Muslim World between 2018 and 2021, (AY-BİR) a civil society association based in Istanbul. Küçükcan works on Middle Eastern affairs, Turkey-EU relations, comparative secularism, freedom of religion, migration, state-religion relations and Muslim minorities in Europe. He is a regular commentator on national and international media. He was a regular contributor to TV debate programs Enine Boyuna and Açı on TRT for many years. He speaks fluent English.

== Publications ==
Books

- State and Religion in Europe; Governing Religious Affairs (Edited by Ali Köse and Talip Küçükcan),İstanbul, Çamlıca Yayınları, 2024, ISBN 9786258427578, 400 pages.
- Arab Image in Modern Turkey: Memory, Popular Culture and Public Perception, (Edited by Talip Küçükcan), İstanbul: Çamlıca Yayınları, 2023, ISBN 9786258427233, 252 pages.
- Global Disruptions and the Making of a New Middle East, (edited by Talip Kucukcan), İstanbul: TRT World Research Centre, 2022, ISBN 9786059984386, 253 pages.
- Türkiye'de Arap İmajı: Toplumsal Hafıza, Popüler Kültür, Kamuoyu, (edited by Talip Küçükcan), İstanbul: Çamlıca Yayınları, 2022, ISBN 9786258427158, 216 pages.
- Küresel Güçlerin Müdahaleciliği: Darbeler ve Demokrasi, (Editör), İstanbul: Üsküdar Belediyesi Yayınları, June 2022, ISBN 9786059719810, 167 pages.
- Politics of Ethnicity, Identity and Religion: Turkish-Muslims in Britain, Avebury: Ashgate, December, 1999
- Diaspora Türkleri (Turkish Diaspora), İstanbul, 2021.
- Dogal Afetler ve Din: Marmara Depremi Uzerine Psiko-Sosyolojik Bir Arastirma (Natural Disasters and Religion) (co-authored with Ali Kose), ISAM, Istanbul, 2000
- EuroTurks and Turkey-EU Relations: The Dutch Case, (co-authored with V. Gungor), Turkevi Research Centre, Amsterdam, 2006
- AB Ulkelerinde Din-Devlet Iliskileri, (State-Religion Relations in EU Countries), (co-edited with Ali Kose) Istanbul: Center for Islamic Research
- Turks in Europe: Culture, Identity and Integration, (Co-edited with V. Gungor), Amsterdam: Turkevi Research Centre, Amsterdam, 2009.
- Türkiye'de Yüksek Öğretim: Karşılaştırmalı Bir Analiz (Higher Education in Turkey: A Comparative Analysis) (with Bekir S. Gur), Ankara: Seta Foundation, 2009
- Yükseköğretimde Kalite Güvencesi (Quality Assurance in Higher Education) (with Mahmut Ozer and Bekir S. Gur), Ankara: Seta Foundation, 2010

== See also ==
- 25th Parliament of Turkey
