= Musa Anter =

Kurdish writer and activist

- Born: Şeyhmus Elmas; 1920; Nusaybin, Diyarbekir vilayet, Ottoman Empire (now in Mardin Province, Turkey)
- Died: 20 September 1992 (aged 71–72); Diyarbakır, Turkey
- Cause of death: Assassination by gunshots
- Other name: Apê Musa ("Uncle Musa")
- Occupations: Writer, political activist
- Notable work: Ferhenga Kurdî
- Political party: People's Labor Party
- Spouse: Ayşe Hanım (m. 1944)

Musa Anter (1920 – 20 September 1992), also known as "Apê Musa" (Kurdish: Apê Musa, literally "Uncle Musa"), was a Kurdish writer, journalist and intellectual. Anter was assassinated by Turkish JITEM in September 1992.

== Early life and education ==
He was born in the Eskimağara (Zivingê) village in Mardin Province. His name after the Surname Law was Şeyhmus Elmas, after Sheikh Şeyhmus, and Elmas meaning Diamond in Turkish. However, he rejected it and wanted to be called Musa Anter. He was born into a respected family and after the death of his father, his mother became the Muhtar of the village who communicated with the tax collectors. His birth date is not known; he was first registered as born in 1924, and then in 1920, but based on his mother's account, who said that Anter was born after the Armenian genocide, Anter assumed to have been born in either 1917 or 1918. He completed his primary education in Mardin, and then studied at junior and senior high school in Adana. During his high school studies, the Dersim rebellion led by Seyid Riza was going on, which lead to some frictions with his Turkish classmates following which he was shortly detained. He was teased by classmates who called him the “son of Bese,” the wife of rebel leader Seyid Riza. In response, Anter reportedly shouted an insult directed at Mustafa Kemal Atatürk’s mother in front of his class. He was imprisoned for fifteen days. After authorities determined that his remarks had not been intended as a direct insult to Atatürk, the governor of Adana intervened and had him released. One official scolded him: “Look son, Atatürk forgave you. Now don’t engage in this sort of childishness again.” From that time forward he became more conscious of his Kurdish identity and the brutality of the Turkish government towards others like him. As the years passed he learned about the atrocities committed in Dersim from the perspective of both the victims and perpetrators.

By 1941, he left for Istanbul to study law. While studying, he was able to run a catering business for the mostly Kurdish students of the Dicle and Firat student halls. During his time at the university, he had often been to Syria during his summer holidays and came into acquaintance with Kurdish nationalist intellectuals such as Celadet and Kamuran Bedir Khan, Kadri and Ekrem Cemilpaşa, Dr. Nafiz, Nûredin Zaza, Nuri Dersimi, Qedrîcan, Osman Sabri, Haco Agha and his son Hasan, Emînê Perîxanê's son Şikriye Emîn, Mala Elyê Unus, Teufo Ciziri and Cigerxwîn. In 1944, he married Ayşe Hanım, the daughter of Abdurrahim Rahmi Zapsu. Ayse was a member of a noble Kurdish family and had studied in a German school in Istanbul. At one moment, he even helped to organize an event for the German Ambassador to Turkey Franz von Papen. Following his military service in the Turkish army, he settled in Diyarbakir, where he became a manager of a Hotel nearby the NATO military base.

== Professional career and Kurdish political activism ==
Anter actively promoted the use of the Kurdish language with his journalistic work, which caused him quite some turmoil during his lifetime. During the 1950s, he established three media outlets: Şark Mecmuasi, (1951), Şark Postasi (1954) and İleri Yurt (1958). Anter was arrested in 1959, after publishing the Kurdish-language poem Qimil in the newspaper İleri Yurt. His arrest provoked a wave of Kurdish protests, in the aftermath of which a trial against fifty Kurdish intellectuals began, known as the "Case of the 49". He eventually served some time in prison but was soon released due to an amnesty. In 1963, Musa Anter and 23 other intellectuals were arrested and sentenced to 3 years for allegedly having attempted to establish an independent Kurdish state. He was released in 1964. In the General elections of 1965 he was an independent candidate for Diyarbakir but was not elected. In 1970, he was one of the charged in the trial of the Revolutionary Cultural Eastern Hearths (DDKO) members. Three years after his release, he settled in Aksaru, a village in the Nusaybin district. Following the coup d'état in 1980, he was shortly jailed for "Kurdish propaganda" in Nusaybin. In June 1990, he was one of the eighty-one founding members of the People's Labour Party (HEP). He later supported the establishments of the Mesopotamian Cultural Center in 1991 and the Kurdish Institute in Istanbul in 1992.

== Death ==
Anter was shot on 20 September 1992 in an incident in which Orhan Miroğlu was also seriously injured. Ümit Cizre claimed that Abdülkadir Aygan, a former member of the Kurdistan Workers' Party (PKK) who had surrendered in 1985, who had been posteriorly recruited as part of the first staff of the JİTEM (the Turkish Gendarmerie's Intelligence and Counter-terrorism Service), reported having been part of a JİTEM unit and, alongside a "Hamit" from Şırnak, had assassinated Musa Anter. The former Major of the Turkish army Cem Ersever claimed that the murder was facilitated by Alaattin Kanat, a former PKK member who was shortly released during the time of the assassination.

Özgür Politika and Zaman (now-defunct Gülen movement newspaper) claimed that the perpetrator was PKK defector Murat İpek, who had allegedly received orders from the Turkish state's contract killer Mahmut Yıldırım (alias "Yeşil"), After long investigations, Turkish Gendarmerie Intelligence and Counter-Terrorism was found guilty of Anter's assassination by the European Court of Human Rights (ECHR) in 2006, which sentenced Turkey to a fine of 28,500 Euros. A Diyarbakır court in 2013 allegedly charged four individuals with Anter's murder, including Mahmut Yıldırım (alias "Yeşil") and Abdülkadir Aygan.

== Legacy ==
He is viewed as an important and influential Kurdish poet and author. He wrote for numerous publications such as İleri Yurt, Deng, Yön, Özgür Gündem, Dicle-Firat, Barış Dünyası amongst others and was also the author of a Kurdish-language dictionary. In 1997, the Turkish Human Rights Association (IHD) supported a peace initiative called the Musa Anter Peace Train.

== Works ==
- Birîna Reş (Black Scar), 1959
- Qimil (Stink Bug), 1962
- Ferhenga Kurdî (Kurdish Dictionary), 1967
- Hatıralarım (My Memories), First Edition, 1991
- Hatıralarım (My Memories), Second Edition, 1992
- Çinara Min (My sycamore), 1999

== Personal life ==
Musa Anter and Ayşe Hanım married in 1944. His wife was a descendant of Bedir Khan Beg and related to the AKP politician Cuneyd Zapsu. He was the father of three children.
