= Saida Sherif =

Pakistani-British broadcaster, educationalist, humanitarian and poet

- Born: Saida Haq; 1932; Old Delhi, British Raj
- Died: 14 March 2023 (aged 90); London, England
- Occupations: Broadcaster; Educationalist; Humanitarian; Poet
- Spouse: Muhammad Ansaruddin Sherif (m. 1948; died 1969)
- Children: 3

Saida Sherif (née Haq; 1932 – 14 March 2023) was a Pakistani-British broadcaster, educationalist, humanitarian and poet. She was a volunteer for the British charitable organisation Convoy of Mercy (CoM), working in Albania, Afghanistan, Azerbaijan, Bosnia and Herzegovina, Indonesia, Kosovo and Pakistan. Sherif worked for the BBC on its Inase Miliye (Let’s Meet) programme and contributed to its Eastern Service. She taught at the Islamic Cultural Centre, community centres in North West London, the Karachi American School, the International Minarah School in Jeddah and Sakarya University in Turkey. Sherif was the author of the collection of poetry in English and Urdu called Kasak published in 2004.

== Early life ==
Sherif was born in Old Delhi's Muslim quarter close to the Red Fort in 1932. She was the youngest daughter and the sixth child of the poet Qazi Shamsul Haq and the teacher Razia Begum (née Syed). The first school Sherif attended, Jamia Milia in Karol Bagh, was operated by pro-independence activists. She was in a class where there were only two girls. There, she learned to use a microphone to address the audience in the school's hall and was eventually employed to work at the All India Radio station for its Sunday children's programme. The ethnic cleansing during the Partition of India in 1947 caused Sherif's family to be moved out of their home and into a refugee camp and then went from Bombay to Karachi by sea. At Karachi, she met the demobbed British Indian Army junior officer Muhammad Ansaruddin Sherif and accepted his proposal of marriage in 1948. The couple had three children and moved to Switzerland by the conclusion of the year after her husband had been appointed the representative of Pakistan at a United Nations agency called the International Labour Organization (ILO).

== Career ==
In 1951, Sherif went to London to reside with her brother, who was training to be an engineer. She enrolled on a course in journalism at the Bedford College in Regent's Park, being the only woman on the course despite the discouragement she received from the college about women being journalists. Sherif also found a job working at the Selfridges bought ledger department. She appeared on the BBC's Inase Miliye (Let’s Meet) programme. Sherif returned to Karachi in 1957 following the end of her husband's diplomatic career. When her husband was unable to find a job, she became the family's primary source of income. She was hired as a ground hostess for Air France and as a teacher of French at the Karachi American School. The economic circumstances forced Sherif to move to London in May 1965 and was allowed entry into the United Kingdom by customs after determining her eldest son was studying at school in the country. She was employed as a bank clerk at the Bank of England in 1967 and was one of the bank's first ethnic minority women employees. Sherif was a contributor to the BBC Eastern Service to supplement the family budget. She authored the script for her three-minute broadcasts in Urdu on the double-decker bus route to Bush House. In 1979, Sherif retired early from the Bank of England on medical grounds. By that time, she was working weekends teaching children at the Islamic Cultural Centre and other community centres in North West London.

From 1981 to 1983, Sherif taught Islam in English at the International Minarah School, an all-girls school in Jeddah, that allowed her to perform the Islamic pilgrimages to Umrah and Hajj. She later enrolled for evening classes at Willesden College of Technology and obtained a further education teacher's certificate with credits in 1984. Sherif worked part-time as a teacher at Harrow College and as a translator for Harrow London Borough Council's legal department. She assisted Ang Swee Chai in her work in providing relief to the survivors of the Sabra and Shatila massacre in Lebanon in 1982. Sherif was a volunteer for the British charitable organisation Convoy of Mercy (CoM), worked in refugee camps and rehabilitation centres in Croatia as well as Bosnia and Herzegovina between 1992 and 1994. She established a rehabilitation centre for the wounded in Croatia in 1993 and a teaching programme in Jablanica, Bosnia and Herzegovina. Sherif attended UN meetings held close to Split, Croatia to get knowledge of roads open for relief convoys which passed on to the Muslim Non Government Organisations. She was invited to speak at the international conference in Sarajevo, 'Education for a Culture of Peace' in June 1995. In December 1996, following the conclusion of the Bosnian War and with the support of imam Mustafa Cerić, Sherif opened nurseries for children in Sarajevo and other towns. She also taught English to Ministry of Religious Affairs staff.

Sherit was also a religious adviser to the Muslim Women's Association and campaigned for Chechen and Palestinian causes. Sherif also attended annual general meetings of the Muslim Council of Britain. She was a member of the CoM's relief missions to support Kosovar refugees in Albania, and projects such as rebuilding an hospital's emergency wing in Prizren, Kosovo in 2000. Sherif worked with Afghan refugee children at Peshawar close to the Pakistani border in 2001, distributing food aid. Other work included teaching children at a Chechen refugee camp in Baku, Azerbaijan, setup makeshift schools in remote mountaintop settings following the 2005 Kashmir earthquake and taught at a remote school in Indonesia. From 2007 to 2009, she taught English at Sakarya University in Turkey. Sherif was the author of the collection of poetry in English and Urdu called Kasak that was published in 2004. A decade later, she published her memoirs, Sparks of Fire, following encouragement from her daughter.

== Recognition and death ==
Sherif was honoured by the Pakistan Federation of Business and Professional Women for her social service in 2003, and was the recipient of The Muslim News Award for Excellence in 2007. She died in London on 14 March 2023, and was buried at Woodcock Hill Cemetery, Rickmansworth two days later.
