= Directorate of Communications =

Turkish government agency

- İletişim Başkanlığı

Agency overview
- Formed: 24 July 2018; 7 years ago
- Preceding agency: Basın-Yayın ve Enformasyon Genel Müdürlüğü
- Headquarters: Ankara
- Agency executive: Burhanettin Duran
- Parent department: Office of the President of Turkey
- Website: iletisim.gov.tr

In Turkey, the Directorate of Communications (Turkish: İletişim Başkanlığı) was established with the Presidential Decree No. 14, published in the Official Gazette No. 30488 dated 24 July 2018. It replaced the now-defunct Press, Publishing and Information General Management (Basın-Yayın ve Enformasyon Genel Müdürlüğü) and is affiliated with the Office of the President of Turkey. Among its duties are directing the country's foreign promotion activities and managing promotional efforts of the state.

With its main objective aimed towards "empowering the Türkiye brand", the directorate undertakes actions on behalf of the public to offer a qualified representation of Turkey in both national and international level.

== List of presidents ==
№	Name	Tenure started	Tenure ended
1	Fahrettin Altun	24 July 2018	10 July 2025
2	Burhanettin Duran	10 July 2025	Incumbent
