= Eskimağara, Nusaybin =

Village in Mardin Province, Turkey

Eskimağara
- Neighbourhood
- Location in Turkey
- Coordinates: 37.194°N 41.102°E
- Country: Turkey
- Province: Mardin
- District: Nusaybin
- Population (2021): 51
- Time zone: UTC+3 (TRT)

Eskimağara (Kurdish: Zivingê) is a neighbourhood in the municipality and district of Nusaybin, Mardin Province in Turkey. The village is populated by Kurds of the Temikan tribe and had a population of 51 in 2021.

== Notable people ==
- Musa Anter
