= Engin Yıldırım =

Turkish professor

Vice President of the Constitutional Court of Turkey
- Incumbent
- Assumed office 19 October 2015
- Preceded by: Alparslan Altan

Judge of the Constitutional Court of Turkey
- In office 9 April 2010 – 19 October 2015

Personal details
- Born: 9 February 1966 (age 60) Istanbul, Turkey
- Spouse: Reyhan Yıldırım
- Education: Istanbul University (BA); University of Warwick (MA); University of Manchester (PhD)

Engin Yıldırım (born 1966 in Üsküdar) is a Turkish professor of Labor Economics and former vice-president of the Constitutional Court of Turkey.

== Early life ==
Engin Yıldırım completed his high school education in 1983 in Beylerbeyi High School. He graduated from the department of Labor Economics and Industrial Relations at Istanbul University in 1987. Yıldırım received his MA from Warwick Business School at University of Warwick in 1989, and PhD from Faculty of Economics and Social Studies, Department of Sociology at University of Manchester in 1994.

== Academic career ==
Yıldırım was a faculty member in Faculty of Economics and Administrative Sciences in Sakarya University between 1994 and 2010. Following his associate professorship in 1997, he became a full professor in 2002 at Sakarya University. Between 2003 and 2010, he served as the dean of Faculty of Economics and Administrative Sciences. During this period, Yıldırım opened the department of Human Resources Management and served as the head of this department.

During his administrative posts in Sakarya University, Yıldırım became famous of his liberal practices. Despite his close ties with religious conservative tradition in Faculty of Economics and Administrative Sciences through Sabahattin Zaim, he was criticized of wearing ring, a symbol of liberal life-style in Turkey. He not only signed the declaration on freedom for headscarf in universities in 2008 against the ban on wearing headscarf in university campuses in Turkey, Yıldırım also declared his support for strike at the Tuzla Shipyards at the same year.

During his years in Sakarya University, Yıldırım gave seminars and courses in Sakarya Bilgi Kültür Merkezi, one of the leading civil-society organizations in Sakarya.

During his academic life, Yıldırım focused on workers' life and trade unions in Turkey. His academic papers appeared in such journals: Middle Eastern Studies; Industrial Relations Journal; Work, Employment and Society; Economic and Industrial Democracy; and Çalışma ve Toplum. Yıldırım is also co-author of a reference book on research method.

== Constitutional Court ==
Yıldırım was appointed to the Judge position at the Constitutional Court on 9 April 2010 by Abdullah Gül, the 11th President of Turkey. On 19 October 2015, he became the Vice-President of the Constitutional Court.

Yıldırım joined a panel on "Sexual Orientation and Gender Identity Equality in the Constitution", organized by The Ankara Bar Association and Kaos GL Association in 2013. In this panel, he openly declared his position on rights of LGBT people with the following words. "Social habits do not change easily, however, LGBT people’s demand for constitutional equality must be viewed as a fundamental human rights issue... This situation is clearly visible in women’s rights and racial discrimination in the USA. This means that once LGBT rights in Turkey gain some public support, this will be reflected in the legal spectrum. This is very difficult in a society where 70% of the public find this way of life to be incorrect... we do not necessarily have to wait for society to reach a certain level".

During his post at the Constitutional Court, Yıldırım continued his academic studies and published some academic papers.
