= Governor of Adana =

Governor of a Turkish Province

Governor of Adana Adana Valiliği
- Logo of the Governor of Adana
- Incumbent; Mustafa Yavuz since January 19, 2026
- Appointer: President of Turkey; On the recommendation of the Turkish government
- Term length: No set term length or limit
- Inaugural holder: Ziya Paşa; 1878
- Website: Office of the Governor

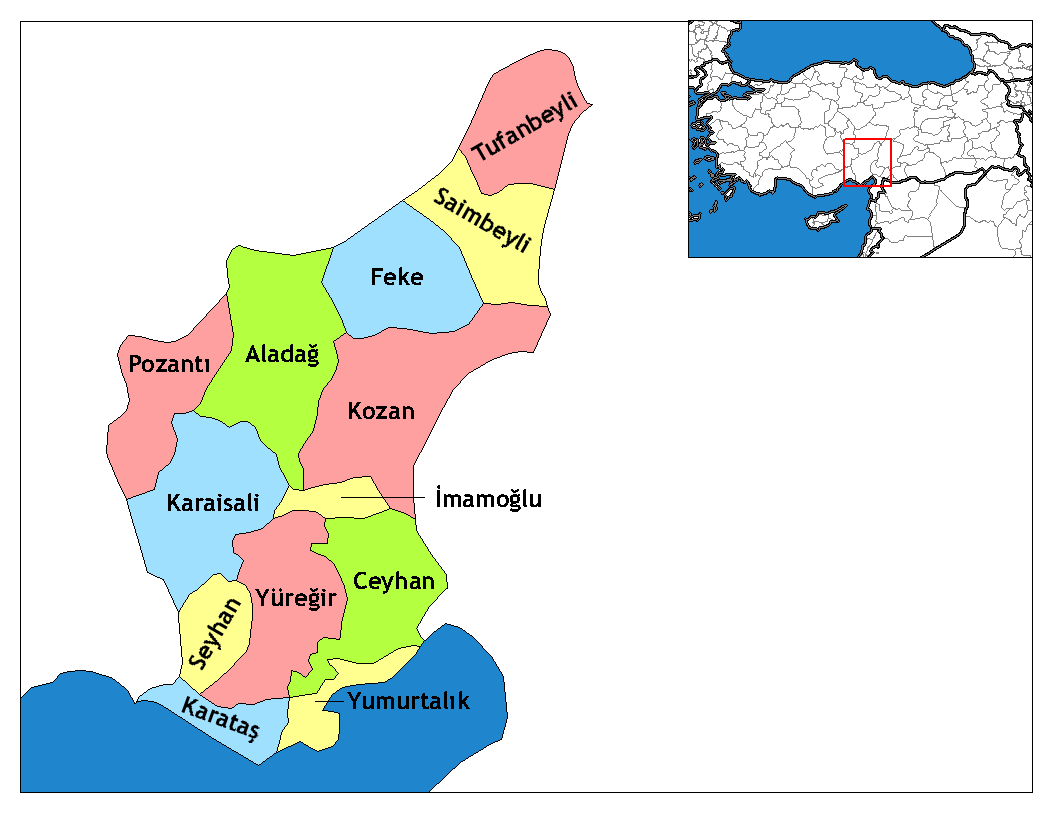
Map of the Province of Adana, showing the provincial districts.

The governor of Adana (Turkish: Adana Valiliği) is the bureaucratic state official responsible for both national government and state affairs in the Province of Adana. Similar to the governors of the 80 other provinces of Turkey, the governor of Adana is appointed by the government of Turkey and is responsible for the implementation of government legislation within Adana. The governor is also the most senior commander of both the Adana provincial police force and the Adana Gendarmerie.

== Appointment ==
The governor of Adana is appointed by the president of Turkey, who confirms the appointment after recommendation from the Turkish government. The Ministry of the Interior first considers and puts forward possible candidates for approval by the cabinet. The governor of Adana is therefore not a directly elected position and instead functions as the most senior civil servant in the province of Adana.

=== Term limits ===
The governor is not limited by any term limits and does not serve for a set length of time. Instead, the governor serves at the pleasure of the government, which can appoint or reposition the governor whenever it sees fit. Such decisions are again made by the cabinet of Turkey. The governor of Adana, as a civil servant, may not have any close connections or prior experience in Adana Province. It is not unusual for governors to alternate between several different provinces during their bureaucratic career.

== Functions ==
The governor of Adana has both bureaucratic functions and influence over local government. The main role of the governor is to oversee the implementation of decisions by government ministries, constitutional requirements and legislation passed by the Grand National Assembly within the provincial borders. The governor also has the power to reassign, remove or appoint officials a certain number of public offices and has the right to alter the role of certain public institutions if they see fit. Governors are also the most senior public official within the province, meaning that they preside over any public ceremonies or provincial celebrations being held due to a national holiday. As the commander of the provincial police and Gendarmerie forces, the governor can also take decisions designed to limit civil disobedience and preserve public order. Although mayors of municipalities and councillors are elected during local elections, the governor has the right to re-organise or to inspect the proceedings of local government despite being an unelected position. A list of formal duties are as follows:

- To oversee the implementation of government legislation, decisions and constitutional requirements within the province of Adana
- To preside over provincial ceremonies and celebrations during national holidays.
- To ensure that government legislation is compatible with all institutions that it affects within Adana.
- To both supervise and re-organise local government institutions if necessary.
- To command both the provincial police and Gendarmerie forces.
- To take decisions to limit civil disobedience and maintain peace and security.
- To adjust the remit of public institutions if necessary.

== List of governors of Adana ==
- Muhittin Akyüz (1922)
- Selahattin Adil (1922–1923)
- Hilmi Uran (1923–1925)
- Reşat Mimaroğlu (1925–1927)
- Müştak Lütfi Gürsan (1928–1929)
- Vehbi Demirel (1929–1932)
- Mümtaz Bey (1932–1935)
- Tevfik Sırrı Gür (1935–1939)
- Eşref Erkut (1939–1941)
- Burhanettin Teker (1941–1944)
- Cemal Celal Tüzün (1944–1946)
- Akif İyidoğan (1946–1948)
- Ahmet Demir (1948–1950)
- Fevzi Karakülah (1950–1951)
- Mehmet Hilmi İncesulu (1951–1953)
- Sait Kemalî Atay (1953–1955)
- Hadi Ömür (1955–1957)
- Sadık Erdem (1957–1960)
- Talat Sungur (1960)
- Gafur Soylu (1960)
- Mukadder Öztekin (1960–1963)
- Ali Rıza Yaradanakul (1963–1966)
- Mustafa Yörükoğlu (1966–1968)
- Sabahattin Çakmakoğlu (1968–1971)
- Fikret Turgut Sayın (1971–1975)
- Yılmaz Ergun (1975–1978)
- Kenan Güven (1978–1979)
- Aydemir Ceylan (1979)
- Metin Dirimtekin (1979–1980)
- Hayri Kozakçıoğlu (1980–1983)
- Erdoğan Şahinoğlu (1983–1988)
- Fevzi Yetkiner (1988–1989)
- Recep Birsin Özen (1989–1992)
- Bekir Aksoy (1992–1993)
- Naci Parmaksız (1993–1995)
- Oğuz Kağan Köksal (1995–2003)
- İsmet Kemal Önal (2003–2004)
- Mustafa Cahit Kıraç (2004–2007)
- İlhan Atış (2007–2011)
- Hüseyin Avni Coş (2011–2014)
- Mustafa Büyük (2014–2016)
- Mahmut Demirtaş (2016–2020)
- Dr. Süleyman Elban (2020–2023)
- Yavuz Selim Köşger (2023–2026)
- Mustafa Yavuz (2026–)

== See also ==
- Governor (Turkey)
- Adana Province
- Ministry of the Interior (Turkey)
