= Musa Anter peace train =

Peace initiative for the Kurdish-Turkish conflict

The Musa Anter Peace Train was a failed 1997 campaign organized by the German Hannover Appell for a peaceful solution for the Kurdish-Turkish conflict. It was named in honor of the Kurdish poet and writer Musa Anter.

The original plan was for a chartered train to leave Brussels, Belgium on 26 August 1997 and arrive in Diyarbakır, Turkey on 1 September. The Turkish government opposed the campaign, and in response Germany and Bulgaria denied permission for the train to cross their territory. The peace activists then took airline flights to Istanbul and tried to travel together to Diyarbakir in a bus convoy. They reached Urfa in southeast Turkey, where Turkish police denied them access to Diyarbakir.

The hundreds of participants in the Peace Train included European and African members of parliaments. Among the supporters of the campaign were Nobel Peace prize laureates José Ramos-Horta of East Timor and Desmond Tutu of South Africa. The convoy included Frances D’ Souza from Article 19, political activist Bruce Kent, members of British socialist parties and was advised by the pro-Kurdish People's Democracy Party (HADEP).

== Preparation ==
Ten railway cars were chartered for the several hundred passengers who had agreed to ride the Peace Train. Rallies and press conferences were planned in cities along the route of the Peace Train, including in the capitals of Austria, Yugoslavia, Hungary and Bulgaria. In Istanbul the train would be transported by ferry across the Bosphorus to the Asian part of Turkey. José Ramos-Horta and the son of Musa Anter addressed crowds that gathered to celebrate the train's departure from Brussels.

== Turkish opposition ==
Turkish Prime Minister Mesut Yilmaz branded the Musa Anter Peace Train as a campaign for separatism from Turkey and a publicity stunt for the Kurdistan Workers' Party (PKK). The Turkish Government tried but failed to compel the Belgian Railway to stop the train.

Under diplomatic pressure from Turkey, the German Ministry of the Interior blocked the Peace Train by denying permission to cross the German border. The Bulgarian government followed suit, accepting Turkey's claim that the Peace Train was in league with the PKK. The German government alleged that Yugoslavia had also denied passage for the Peace Train.

In response, the German human rights organization Medico International booked flights from European cities to Istanbul for many of the Peace Train volunteers. From Istanbul the journey was to continue to Diyarbakir by bus. The peace train organizers claimed that the train had become a "peace plane". Germany's decision to block the Peace Train stirred protests from supporters, including the author Harold Pinter.

== Bus convoy ==
Buses were organized for the further journey towards Southeast Anatolia passing through Siverek and Urfa. In Urfa the activists were rounded up by the police and the convoy was denied the entrance to the city of Diyarbakir, where they had planned to participate in a rally for peace in Southeast Anatolia. In Diyarbakır several hundred people expecting the political activists were detained.

As the group wanted to reach Ankara, it was met with a prohibition to enter the city as well. On the way to Istanbul, the police tried to detain several Kurdish members of the delegation, which lead to a brawl between the authorities and Swiss members trying to prevent the detention. On the 3 September, a prosecutor ordered the expulsion of the Swiss delegation. Arriving in Istanbul on 2 September 1997, many of the convoy members had to look for a new hotel as their hotel bookings were canceled on short notice. On the 3 September, a prosecutor ordered the expulsion of the Swiss members of the convoy, who tried to defend the Kurdish delegation. The remainder of the convoy was put under house arrest in the MiM hotel. A press conference which was announced for the 3 September at the Pera Palace Hotel, was prohibited by the Municipality of Istanbul with the police having cordoned off the surroundings of the hotel.

== Aftermath ==
Twenty-one members of the convoy arriving in Istanbul were briefly detained at the MiM Hotel in Istanbul. Turkish citizen Akin Birdal and others were detained or investigated for taking part in the peace train. In December 1997 Birdal was acquitted of charges relating to his support for the Peace Train.

The photographer Julia Guest organized an exhibition on the Peace Train's journey in December 1997.
