= Dicle-Firat (newspaper) =

Bilingual Kurdish-Turkish newspaper

Dicle-Firat was a bilingual newspaper in the languages Turkish and Kurdish and published in Istanbul between September 1962 and May 1963. It focused on the Turkification process of the Kurds and the so-called "Eastern question" while east was used to describe the eastern Kurdish regions in Turkey. It had lectors throughout most provinces and letters to the editorial board were sent in from a variety of cities such as Mardin, Erzurum, Van, Siirt, Igdir, Diyarbakir or Ağrı. Prominent Kurdish journalists like Yasar Kaya, Musa Anter or Edip Karahan, played a significant role in the newspaper. The newspaper also established an office researching the Kurdish heritage in the Kurdish populated region in the east of Turkey. Edip Karahan, the owner of the newspaper and Musa Anter were arrested in June 1963 and the newspaper closed down by the Turkish authorities.
