= Kurdish Institute of Istanbul =

Former Institute in Turkey

Kurdish Institute of Istanbul (Kurdish: Enstîtuya Kurdî Ya Stenbolê, Turkish: İstanbul Kürt Enstitüsü), founded in 1992, was an organization focusing on Kurdish literature, language and culture. Kurdish and Turkish intellectuals such as Musa Anter, Yaşar Kaya, İsmail Beşikçi, Cemşid Bender, Feqî Huseyîn Sagniç, Abdurrahman Dürre, İbrahim Gürbüz and Süleyman İmamoğlu were among the founding members.

The institute's main research activities were in the fields of linguistics, folklore and history. It published a research journal titled Zend. The institute held courses in the languages Zazaki, Kurmanji and Sorani,and provided certificates of translation into/from Kurdish.

It has published a Kurdish-Turkish dictionary (Büyük Türkçe-Kürtçe sözlük / Ferhanga Mezın Tırkî Kurdî and Büyük Kürtçe-Türkçe Sözlük / Ferhanga Mazın Kurdî Turkî) prepared by Zana Farqînî in 2004. The institute has also re-published many of the classical works in Kurdish literature, including the works of Faqi Tayran.

== Closures ==
The institute was first raided and shut down on 15 November 1992, shortly after its opening.

The institute was again closed down and sealed on the morning of 31 December 2016, per a declaration issued under Article 11 of the Turkish State of Emergency (OHAL).
