= Burhanettin Duran =

Turkish political life scholar

- Born: 1971 (age 54–55); Sakarya, Turkey
- Citizenship: Turkish
- Education: Boğaziçi University, Bilkent University
- Known for: Political Islam in Turkey
- Scientific career
- Fields: Turkish Political Life and Turkish Foreign Policy
- Workplaces: Istanbul Sehir University, and Foundation for Political, Economic and Social Research
- Doctoral advisor: Umit Cizre

Burhanettin Duran (born 1971) is a Turkish scholar and diplomat serving as Turkey's deputy foreign minister since 2024. His academic work specializes on the transformation of political Islam under Turkey's Justice and Development Party (AKP). He previously chaired the International Relations Department at Sakarya University and served as the general director of the Foundation for Political, Economic and Social Research (SETA). Since 2018, he has been a member of the Presidential Security and Foreign Policies Council.

== Early years ==
Born in 1971 in Adapazarı, Sakarya, Duran attended Adapazarı Imam Hatip school (now Adapazarı Anadolu Imam Hatip school) and graduated in 1989. In 1991, he co-founded the Sakarya İmam-Hatip Lisesi Mezunları ve Mensupları Derneği (SIMDER) with alumni including Atilla Arkan and Kadir Ardıç.

Duran received his BA from the Department of Political Science and International Relations at Boğaziçi University in 1993. He completed his MA in Bilkent University in 1994 with a thesis titled "Kenan Evren's and Turgut Özal's Conceptualizations of Secularism: A Comparative Perspective". Duran received his Ph.D. from the same university upon completion of his doctoral thesis titled "Transformation of Islamist political Thought in Turkey from the Empire to the Early Republic (1908-1960): Necip Fazıl Kısakürek's Political Ideas" in 2000. During his graduate education, he worked for Bilkent as a research assistant.

== Academic life ==
Burhanettin Duran received his bachelor's degree in political science and international relations from Boğaziçi University in 1993 and his Ph.D. in political science and public administration from Bilkent University in 2001.

Between 1993 and 2001, Duran served as a research assistant in the Department of Public Administration at Sakarya University. From 2001 to 2006, he was a faculty member in the Department of International Relations at Sakarya University. He became an associate professor in 2006 in the field of Political Life and Institutions and served as the head of the Department of International Relations between 2006 and 2009. He was promoted to full professor in 2013 in the discipline of International Relations.

In 2009, Duran joined the founding academic staff of İstanbul Şehir University, where he served as the head of the Department of Political Science and International Relations until 2015. During this period, his academic work concentrated on Turkish political thought, political Islam, and Turkish foreign policy. From 2015 to 2018, he was a faculty member at İbn Haldun University, where he contributed to the institution's foundational development and the design of its curriculum in political science and international relations. He also held an academic affiliation with Ankara Social Sciences University (Ankara Sosyal Bilimler Üniversitesi), where he taught graduate-level courses and supervised theses in international relations and political science. Among his notable students are Ali Balcı, professor at Sakarya University; Nebi Miş, chair of SETA; and Tuncay Bilecen, associate professor at Kocaeli University.

In 2003, Duran, with his colleagues from Sakarya University and friends from Sakarya, established BilgiEvi (House of Knowledge), a civil society organization focusing on education and cultural activities. Its name was changed as Sakarya Bilgi Kültür Merkezi (A Center for Knowledge and Culture) in 2006.

== Political career ==
In 2013, Duran was appointed as the general coordinator of SETA's Istanbul branch, becoming the office's first coordinator — a position he held until 2014, when he was succeeded by Fahrettin Altun. In that same year, he relocated to Ankara and took office as the general coordinator of SETA (Foundation for Political, Economic and Social Research), a role he maintained through 2024. Under his leadership, SETA grew into a prominent policy network closely aligned with government and media sectors, regularly organizing panels and producing annual publications such as the *Turkish Foreign Policy Yearbook*.

In October 2018, Duran was appointed a member of the Presidential Security and Foreign Policy Board, contributing to the formulation of Turkey’s strategic foreign policy direction. On 16 May 2024, President Recep Tayyip Erdoğan appointed Duran as a Deputy Minister of Foreign Affairs. In this capacity, he remained in office until 10 July 2025, overseeing Turkey’s diplomatic engagement in Africa and mediating peace talks between Ethiopia and Somalia.

On 10 July 2025, Duran was appointed as president of the Directorate of Communications, succeeding Fahrettin Altun. This post places him at the helm of Türkiye’s strategic domestic and international media policy—tasked with promoting government messaging, coordinating official information operations, and countering disinformation networks.

== Academic studies ==
Duran has been focusing on the transformation of Islamism, Turkish political thought, Turkish domestic politics, Turkish foreign policy and Middle Eastern politics. He is the author of Türk Parlamento Tarihi [History of Turkish Parliament] (3 volumes) (Ankara: TBMM, 2012) and the coeditor of Dünya Çatışma Bölgeleri I-II [Conflict Regions in the World] (Nobel, 2004, 2010), Dönüşüm Sürecindeki Türkiye [Turkey in Transition] (Alfa, 2007), Ortadoğu Yıllığı 2008 [Middle East Annual] (Küre, 2009) and Türk Dış Politikası Yıllığı Annual for Turkish Foreign Policy published since 2009 annually.

His articles have appeared in Middle Eastern Studies, Journal of Muslim Minority Affairs, Journal of Balkan and Near Eastern Studies, Insight Turkey, The Muslim World, EuroAgenda, Liberal Düşünce, Bilgi, Sivil Toplum. He has contributed to several edited books.

Duran writes a column in Sabah, one of the leading dailies in Turkey, and its English-language sister Daily Sabah.

== Views ==
Duran is known as a critic of political Islam's engagement with the European Union in Turkey. For him, the use of an EU-related language weakened Islamic discourse of political Islam in Turkey. Although this EUropeanized language was a strategy of political Islam in the power struggle against the secular establishment of Turkey, this strategy transformed the identity of political Islam by weakening its Islamic vocabulary.

After his appointment as the director of the SETA, a think tank close to the Justice and Development Party (AKP), Duran turned a prominent and vocal supporter of the AKP government. Ertuğrul Özkök, a fervent critic of the AKP, called Duran as one of "benign" supporters of the AKP.

In July 2019, SETA released an "over 200- page document, which addresses the reports by BBC Turkish, Deutsche Welle Turkish, Voice of America (VoA), Euronews, CRI Turk and the Independent Turkish." The report caused immediate concern that SETA was using the report for "targeting the journalists." Subsequent reports indicated that the controversial document was produced by a faction within SETA known for its more hawkish and confrontational tone. This group was not directly associated with Burhanettin Duran’s leadership team and eventually left the organization following internal disagreements and a growing rift between the circles aligned with Duran and those affiliated with Fahrettin Altun. The resignations that followed were widely interpreted as a consolidation of SETA's leadership under Duran and a shift toward a more centralized and less factional structure.

== Rectorship Controversy ==
Duran resigned from his post in Istanbul Sehir University at October 25, 2015 with a protest letter. In this letter, he and his colleagues criticized Istanbul Sehir University administration on the ground that new-appointed rector, Ali Atif Bir, is close to the Gulen Movement and once defended headscarf-ban in Turkey. By directly quoting Bir's statement, "The Council of Higher Education [in Turkey] is fully right in its fight against headscarf. If headscarf enters to universities, Turkey will lose its fight against sharia", Duran and his colleagues criticized the appointment of Bir as a stark deviation from Istanbul Sehir University's principles based on freedom and equality.

After the resignation of Duran and his two colleagues, a group of student from the university organized a rally during which they carried placards that read "we want our professors back" and "we do not want Ali Atif Bir". In order to appease student protests, Murat Ülker, the chairman of the Board of Trustees of Istanbul Sehir University posted to his social media account a report about the campaign for "freedom to headscarf" organized in 2007 and one of whose signatories was Ali Atif Bir. However, this did not end the controversy over the appointment of Bir. The university administration stepped back and appointed Cengiz Kallek, a professor on the economic history of early Islamic period, as a new rector at 6 November 2015.
