= Mustafa Yavuz =

Austrian footballer

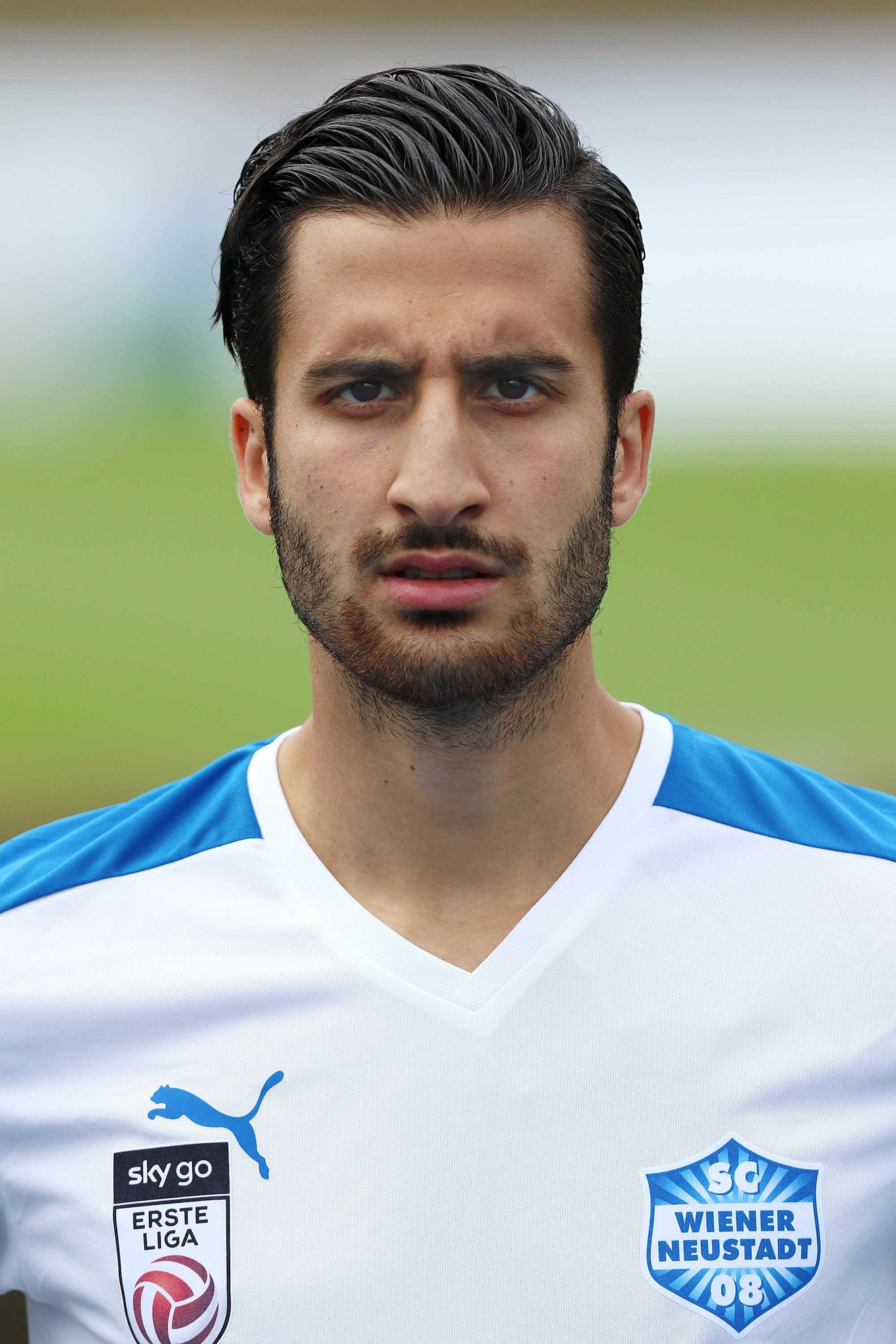
- Mustafa Yavuz (2015)

Personal information
- Full name: Mustafa Yavuz
- Date of birth: 13 April 1994 (age 32)
- Place of birth: Austria
- Height: 1.84 m (6 ft 1/2 in)
- Position: Midfielder

Team information
- Current team: FCM Traiskirchen
- Number: 25

Youth career
- 2001–2008: Favoritner AC
- 2008–2012: Austria Wien

Senior career*
Years	Team	Apps	(Gls)
2011–2012	Austria Wien II	1	(0)
2012–2013	1. Simmeringer SC	23	(1)
2013–2017	Admira Wacker II	50	(2)
2014	Admira Wacker	1	(0)
2015–2016	→ Wiener Neustadt (loan)	17	(0)
2017–2019	Wiener Neustadt	27	(0)
2020–	FCM Traiskirchen	2	(0)
- * Club domestic league appearances and goals as of 18:44, 21 June 2020 (UTC)

Mustafa Yavuz (born 13 April 1994) is an Austrian footballer who plays as a midfielder for FCM Traiskirchen.

== Personal life ==
Yavuz is of Turkish descent.
