= Ümit Cizre =

Turkish political scientist (born 1946)

- Born: 1946 (age 79–80)
- Education: London University (B.Sc.); Middle East Technical University(M.Sc.); Ankara University(P.hD)

Ümit Cizre (born 1946) is a Turkish academic, and a leading expert on civilian-military relations in Turkey. She is a professor of political science and international relations at Istanbul Şehir University. She is the editor of Almanac Turkey 2005 – Security Sector and Its Democratic Oversight (2006), which gained public attention in Turkey.

== Career ==
After graduating from London University in 1968 she gained a masters from Middle East Technical University in 1982 and a doctorate from Ankara University in 1987. She was at the Bilkent University in Ankara, later becoming director of the Center for Modern Turkish Studies at Istanbul Şehir University in 2010.

She has been a Fulbright Scholar and visiting professor at Princeton University, and a public policy scholar at the Woodrow Wilson International Center for Scholars (2009).

== Books ==
- Secular and Islamic politics in Turkey. The making of the Justice and Development Party (London and New York: Routledge, 2008)
- Almanac Turkey 2005 – Security Sector and Its Democratic Oversight (2006), TESEV
- AP-Ordu İlişkileri-Bir İkilemin Anatomisi, Istanbul: İletişim Yayınları, Second Edition, November 2002.
