= Sami Güçlü =

Turkish politician (born 1950)

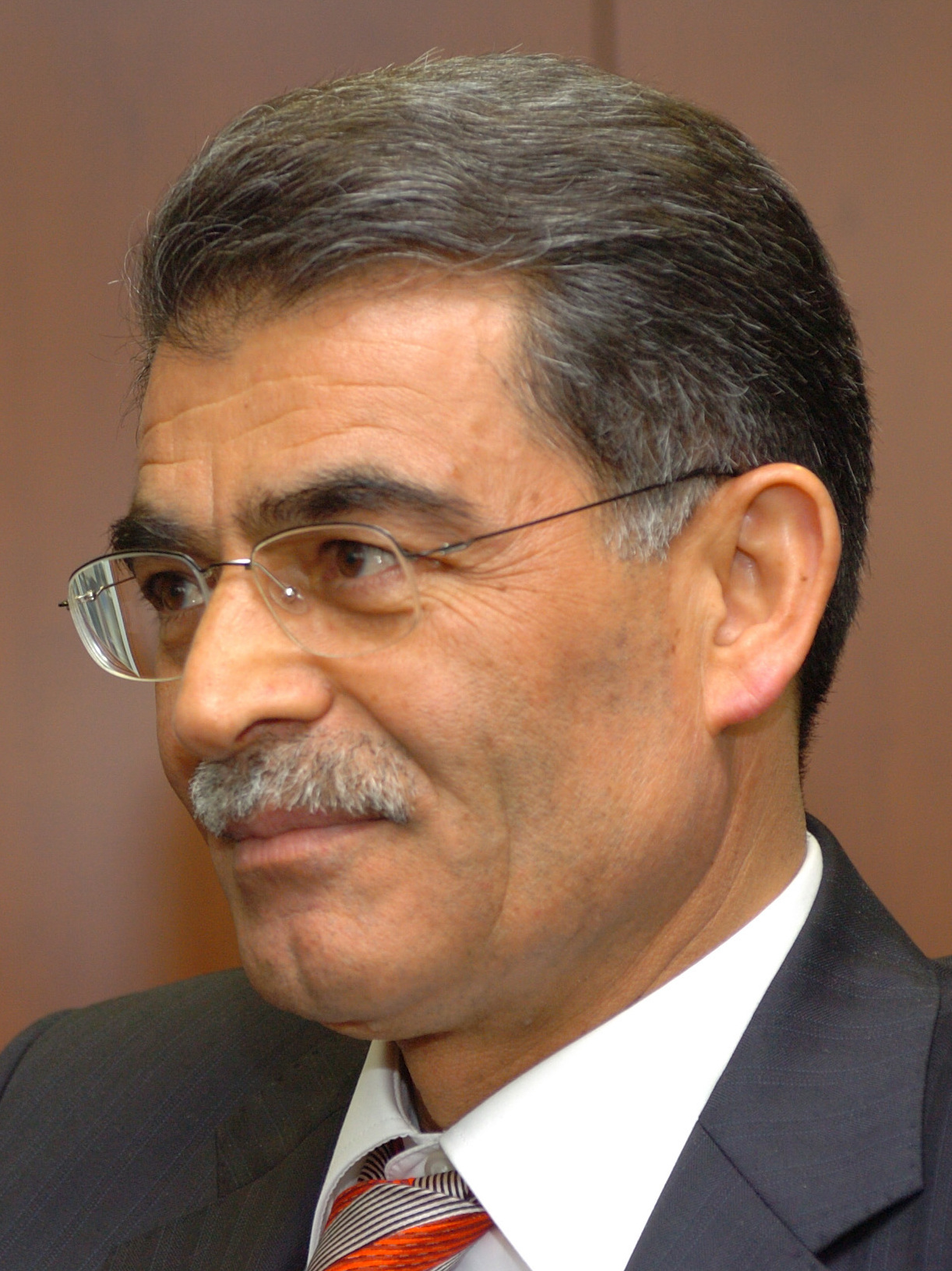
Güçlü in 2005

Sami Güçlü (born September 6, 1950, Konya, Turkey), is a Turkish politician. He is a founding member of the Justice and Development Party. He was the Minister of Agriculture and Rural Affairs in the cabinet of Abdullah Gül and the first cabinet of Recep Tayyip Erdogan.

Political offices
Preceded by Hüsnü Yusuf Gökalp	Minister of Agriculture and Village Affairs; November 18, 2002– June 3, 2005	Succeeded by Mehmet Mehdi Eker
