= Foundation for Political, Economic and Social Research =

Turkish think-tank

Foundation for Political Economic and Social Research
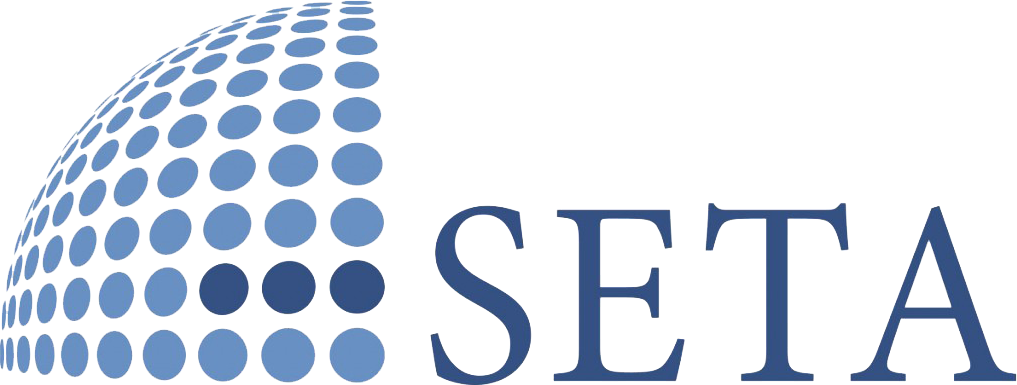
- Abbreviation: SETA
- Formation: 2006; 19 years ago
- Type: Public policy think tank
- Headquarters: Nene Hatun Cad. No: 66 GOP, 06700
- Location: Çankaya, Ankara
- Coordinates: 39.89897°N 32.867605°E
- General Coordinator: Nebi Miş
- Website: Official website

The Foundation for Political, Economic and Social Research (Turkish: Siyaset, Ekonomi ve Toplum Araştırmaları Vakfı, SETA) is a policy think-tank based in Ankara, Turkey. It was established in 2006 with the objective of producing "up-to-date and accurate knowledge and analyses in the fields of politics, economy and society" and informing "policy makers and the public on changing political, economic, social and cultural conditions." Its general coordinator has been Burhanettin Duran since 2014. The group describes itself as independent, nonprofit and nonpartisan, but is described by Deutsche Welle as being controlled by President Recep Tayyip Erdoğan.

It has offices in Istanbul, Washington, D.C., and Cairo, and produces an academic journal on Turkey, Insight Turkey.

== Relationship with AKP and Recep Tayyip Erdoğan ==
Despite claiming to be independent, SETA has close relations with AKP government led by Recep Tayyip Erdogan and accordingly organized many academic panels to legitimize official policies of the AKP. Close political affiliations and single-sided viewpoints have led to the group being frequently labelled "AKP’s think tank" or "pro-government," in reference to the country's leading party whose position it backs, by Western media.

Some of the current and former SETA members are also serving as high-ranking officials for the presidential system of Recep Tayyip Erdoğan and are also columnists for pro-AKP newspapers. İbrahim Kalın, the founding director of the SETA, is now a chief adviser to the Turkish president Recep Tayyip Erdoğan and also the Presidential Spokesperson since 2014 and was a columnist for the leading pro-AKP newspaper Sabah. Fahrettin Altun, former Istanbul General Coordinator of SETA & Deputy General Coordinator of SETA is now serving as the Presidential Head of Communication and was a columnist for the pro-AKP newspaper Sabah. Burhanettin Duran, general coordinator of SETA is also a member of the Presidential Security and Foreign Policy Board and is a columnist for the pro-AKP newspaper Sabah. Muhammet Mücahit Küçükyılmaz, former communication coordinator of SETA is now serving as a chief adviser to Recep Tayyip Erdoğan and was a columnist for the pro-AKP newspaper Sabah. Hatice Karahan, who did economics research for SETA is now serving as an economic advisor to Recep Tayyip Erdoğan and was a columnist for the pro-AKP newspaper Yeni Şafak.

In early July 2019, SETA published a 202-page report titled "International Media Outlets' Extensions in Turkey", which caused great controversy both in Turkey and abroad. The report provided individual names and professional backgrounds of Turkish journalists working in institutions such as Euronews in Turkish, BBC Turkish, Deutsche Welle Turkish, Voice of America (Voice of America), Sputnik Turkey, CRI Turkey, and the Independent Turkish. It also provided examples of the news that journalists share on social media and accused members of the press of having an anti-government bias. Journalism associations and unions have condemned the report, saying it targeted journalists. The Turkish Union of Journalists (TGS) has said that it plans to file a criminal complaint about the report. The BBC made the following announcement about the report on Twitter: "The BBC also rejects the allegations in this report. The 'blacklisting' of journalists is completely unacceptable. It is vital that journalists can work freely, without threats and intimidation and the Turkish authorities must ensure media freedom."
