= Insight Turkey =

Academic journal (1999–)

- Discipline: Political science
- Language: English
- Edited by: Past editors: İhsan Dağı, Talip Küçükcan; Present editor: Muhittin Ataman

Publication details
- History: 1999–present
- Publisher: SETA (Turkey)
- Frequency: Quarterly

Standard abbreviations
- ISO 4: Insight Turk.

Indexing
- ISSN: 1302-177X

Links
- Journal homepage

Insight Turkey is an academic journal publishing peer-reviewed articles on Turkish politics since 1999. The previous editor of the journal was Talip Küçükcan, a professor of sociology at the Marmara University in Istanbul, Turkey, but who is now the AK Party Member of Parliament for Adana.

Insight Turkey is indexed and abstracted in EBSCO, European Sources Online (ESO), Index Islamicus, Middle East & Central Asian Studies, Scopus, Sociological Abstracts, and Worldwide Political Science Abstracts, among other scientific databases. Back issues are open to public view and downloading free of charge.

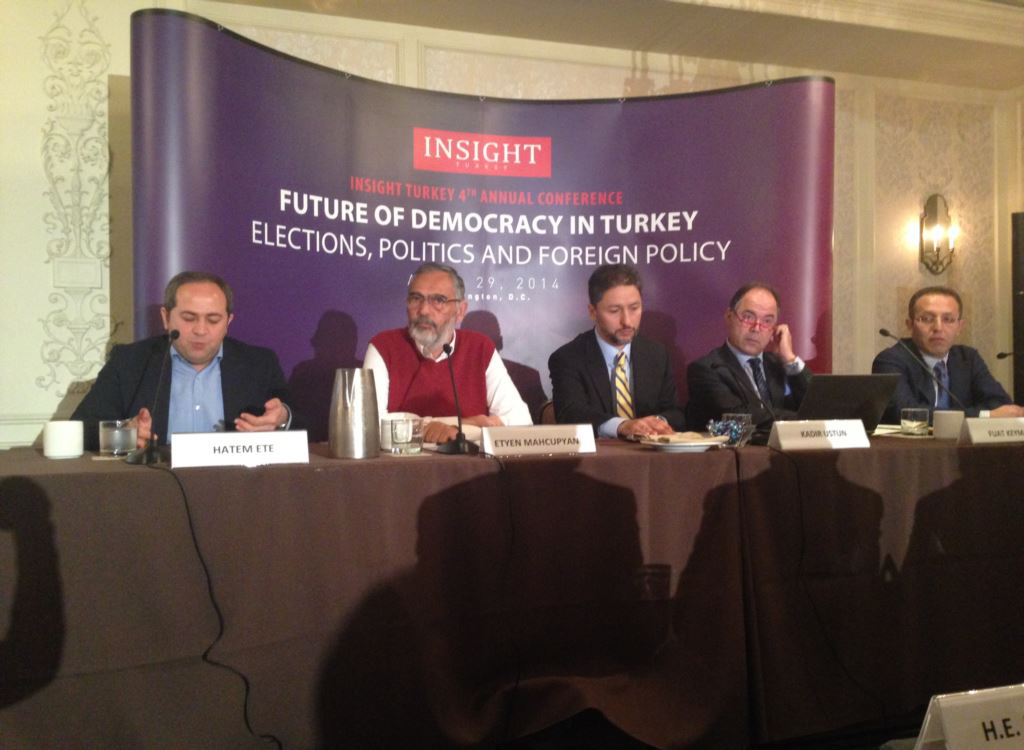
4th Insight Turkey Annual Conference
