= Istanbul Şehir University =

Private university located in Istanbul, Turkey

- İstanbul Şehir Üniversitesi
- Motto: Research, understand, and share.
- Type: Private (Non-profit)
- Active: May 31, 2008; 18 years ago–June 30, 2020
- Affiliations: CoHE; Bologna Process; Erasmus
- President of the Board of Trustees: Prof. Dr. Ömer Dinçer
- Location: Kartal and Üsküdar, Istanbul, Turkey; 41°01′32.34″N 029°02′43.62″E
- Campus: Altunizade Campus, (Üsküdar), and Dragos Campus (Kartal)
- Language: English and Turkish
- Founder: Bilim ve Sanat Vakfı (Foundation for Science and Arts)
- Colors: Bondi Blue

Istanbul Şehir University (Turkish: İstanbul Şehir Üniversitesi, lit. 'City University of Istanbul') was a private, non-profit university located in Istanbul, Turkey. It was established in 2008 by the Bilim ve Sanat Vakfı (BiSaV or BSV, English: Foundation for Science and Arts). The university started its education in the academic year of 2010–11 at its campus in Altunizade, Üsküdar, following a ceremony held on October 5, 2010 that was attended by then President Abdullah Gül, Prime Minister Recep Tayyip Erdoğan and Minister of Foreign Affairs Ahmet Davutoğlu.

The university was closed down on June 30, 2020, after it faced financial difficulties stemming from a legal land dispute, which in turn was fueled by a bitter political feud. With Presidential Decree No. 2708, issued on June 30, 2020, the official authorization of Istanbul Şehir University was revoked. Following this decision, the university's campus and students were transferred to Marmara University.

== Organisation ==
The university had six faculties, three graduate institutes, a vocational school, four research centers, and a language school, organized as follows:

- College of Humanities and Social Sciences: Political Science and International Relations (in English), Political Science and International Relations (in Turkish), Sociology (in English), Psychology (in English), Psychology (in Turkish), History (in English), Turkish Language and Literature (mainly in Turkish, but few courses are in English), Philosophy (in English)
- College of Engineering and Natural Sciences: Computer Science & Engineering (in English), Electrical Engineering (in English), Industrial Engineering (in English), Industrial Engineering (in Turkish)
- School of Management and Administrative Sciences: Management (in English), International Trade and Management (in English), Entrepreneurship (in Turkish), Management Information Systems (in Turkish), Economics (in English)
- College of Communications: Cinema and Television (in English), Cinema and Television (in Turkish), Public Relations (in Turkish)
- School of Law (mainly in Turkish, but few courses are in English)
- School of Islamic Studies (in Turkish, English, and Arabic)
- Graduate School of Humanities and Social Sciences: Cultural Studies (in English), Political Science and International Relations (in English), Modern Turkish Studies (in English), History (in English), Sociology (in English), Public Law (in Turkish), Private Law (in Turkish), Clinical Psychology (in Turkish), Urban Studies (in Turkish), Cinema and Television (in Turkish)
- Graduate School of Business: Business Non-Thesis Graduate Program (in Turkish), Executive MBA (in Turkish), Executive MBA (in English)
- Graduate School of Natural and Applied Sciences: Electronics and Computer Engineering (in English), Industrial and Systems Engineering (in English), Cybersecurity Engineering (in Turkish), Data Science (in English)
- Vocational High School (in Turkish): School of Justice, Computer Programming, Child Development, Photography and Videography, Graphic Design
- Research Centers: Center for Urban Studies, Center for Higher Education Studies, Center for Modern Turkish Studies, Technology Transfer Office
- School of Languages: Sehir English Preparatory Program (SEPP), Turkish for International Students, the School also offers language courses in: Arabic, Chinese, French, German, Greek, Latin, Persian, Russian, Spanish, Ottoman Turkish

== Campus ==
Istanbul Şehir University operated three campuses in Altunizade, Üsküdar — referred to as the West Campus, East Campus, and South Campus. During the 2017–2018 academic year, the university relocated to its main campus in Dragos, Kartal. The move had been delayed for an extended period due to environmental concerns surrounding the construction of the new campus.

The Dragos campus featured a range of facilities designed to support academic and student life, including on-campus dormitories, a library, a soccer field, a student center with dining options, and a large outdoor recreational area. These amenities aimed to create a comprehensive environment for education and community activities.

== Financial crisis and closure ==
In November 2019, the university faced financial trouble and was unable to pay the salaries of faculty members and the scholarships of students despite its revenue of millions of dollars. The reason was a freeze on its assets imposed by a court order, after a year-long trial, on request for an arrestment of funds by the state-owned Halkbank, which had concerns regarding the pay back of a US$70 million credit. A real estate, which belonged to the state-owned monopoly company Tekel, was transferred free of charge to the university as campus ground, and became subject of security for a credit from the Halkbank. The real estate lost its security status when the Council of State ruled at the last instance in favor of the Chamber of Architects branch of the Union of Chambers of Turkish Engineers and Architects (TMMOB) overturning the court's decision in the case. It was claimed by university representatives that the measure was of a political rather than technical nature due to the political fallout between Erdoğan and Ahmet Davutoğlu, the latter being a co-founder of the university.

By mid December 2019, the Council of Higher Education (YÖK) ruled for a temporary handover of Istanbul Şehir University to Marmara University, which was the "guarantor university" of the former. It was stated that the university was unable to continue its educational activities due to its financial situation. The operation license for education of the university was then suspended.

With the Presidential decree no. 2708 issued on June 30, 2020, the official authorization of Istanbul Şehir University was revoked. The Council of Higher Education (YÖK), after a general meeting on June 30, 2020, later announced that the students of Istanbul Şehir University were to be transferred to Marmara University.
