= Kurdish Hezbollah insurgency =

Conflict between Kurdish Hezbollah and Turkey

- Part of the Kurdish–Turkish conflict
Date	1983–2013 (30 years); Main phase: 1995–2002 (7 years)
Location	Turkey
Result	Turkish victory

Belligerents
Kurdish Hezbollah; Supported by: HIK (1993–2004); IMK (until disarmament); Iran (alleged); PKK (sometimes; alleged; until 2025)	Turkey	PKK (until 2025)

Commanders and leaders
Hüseyin Velioğlu †; Edip Gümüş (POW); Cemal Tutar (POW); İsa Altsoy (surrendered)	(Turkey) Süleyman Demirel; (Turkey) Tansu Çiller; (Turkey) Mesut Yılmaz; (Turkey) Necmettin Erbakan; (Turkey) Bülent Ecevit; (Turkey) Abdullah Gül; (Turkey) Recep Tayyip Erdoğan; (Turkey) Gaffar Okkan X	Abdullah Öcalan (POW); Mihail Bayro †

Units involved
Military wing	Turkish Armed Forces; Gendarmerie; JÖH; JİTEM; Village Guards; Interior Ministry; GDS; PÖH; MİT	Military wing

Casualties and losses
200 killed	Unknown	500 killed

The Kurdish Hezbollah insurgency was a period of assassinations, armed clashes, kidnappings, and other assaults led by the Kurdish Hezbollah between the 1980s and 2000s. The insurgency started when Kurdish Hezbollah was first founded, and was led by Hüseyin Velioğlu until he was killed by Turkish police in 2000, and then by İsa Altsoy from 2001 until he announced the group's disarmament in 2002.

== Background ==
Turkish authorities alleged that the Kurdish Hezbollah was financed by Iran, and its fighters were trained in the Islamic Republic of Iran, with Iran allegedly planning on using Kurdish Hezbollah to overthrow the Turkish government and establish an Iran-style Islamic Republic. Nevertheless, Kurdish Hezbollah abandoned that goal and began prioritising Kurdish separatism.

The Kurdish Hezbollah viewed Turkey as an oppressive state and an enemy to Islam, and viewed the PKK as a threat. Kurdish Hezbollah claimed to be the sole representative of Kurds in Turkey and viewed the PKK as illegitimate, while the PKK felt the same way towards them. Kurdish Hezbollah members refused to acknowledge the PKK by their name "Partiya Karkerên Kurdistanê", and only used "Partiya Kafirên Kurdistanê". In the Kurdish Hezbollah manifesto, written by Hüseyin Velioğlu, the official goal for the group was Kurdish independence.

== Conflict with the PKK ==
When the Kurdish Hezbollah was founded, it was allied to the PKK, with some of the earliest Kurdish Hezbollah fighters having received their training in PKK camps. Later, differences arose over which group was the representative of the Kurds, although the Kurdish Hezbollah did not want to fight the PKK, and at times they had even repeatedly tried making peace with the PKK, but failed. They had sent a delegation to visit Beqaa Valley to make peace and discuss future cooperation with the PKK, although they were disrupted on 17 May 1991, when the PKK, while unprovoked, killed the parents of a high-ranking Kurdish Hezbollah member in Şırnak. The Kurdish Hezbollah, at the funeral, declared a war against the PKK, and on 3 December 1991, Kurdish Hezbollah member Muhammed Ata killed Mihail Bayro, killed a PKK regional officer and his bodyguards. Ata was later killed in clashes with Turkish forces. The clashes between PKK and Kurdish Hezbollah continued until 1995, with the PKK losing around 500 fighters and Kurdish Hezbollah losing much less at around 200. After 1995, Hezbollah and PKK both stopped targeting each other and shifted their full attention to fighting Turkey, although they had no formal agreement and remained enemies.

Throughout the 1990s, the Kurdish Hezbollah frequently stated that it does not want to fight the PKK, and that the conflict between them only hurts the Kurds while benefitting Turkey and the deep state. Hezbollah also claimed that the PKK was intolerant and was the one who started the conflict.

According to Turkey, the PKK and Hezbollah made a formal and fully effective ceasefire in 1998, and their relations slowly began to develop, paving the way for future cooperation. It was around this time when Hüseyin Velioğlu quickly rose up to be the most wanted man in Turkey after Abdullah Öcalan.

Kurdish Hezbollah denied the accusations of working with the Turkish state, and claims that it is PKK propaganda, while the Turkish state also considers Kurdish Hezbollah as a terrorist organization and as a threat, although they tolerated the Kurdish Hezbollah at first, due to them fighting the PKK. In an interview, a Kurdish Hezbollah dissident who personally knew Hüseyin Velioğlu, claimed that the Kurdish Hezbollah had no ties with the Turkish state, nor did the Turkish state tolerate Hezbollah. He stated that the Turkish state was too busy fighting the PKK to focus on Hezbollah, which allowed the Hezbollah to grow, although the Turkish state quickly defeated the Hezbollah when Öcalan was arrested and the PKK was weakened. A retired JITEM agent confirmed that Turkey had offered Kurdish Hezbollah help against PKK, although Hüseyin Velioğlu kept refusing it, reaffirming their hatred for Turkey and their strive for peace with the PKK.

The Kurdish Hezbollah claimed that all the testimonies of people who said that the Turkish state founded and used Hezbollah were false, and in turn, Hezbollah provided statements from Kesire Yıldırım (Öcalan's ex-wife), and people involved in the MİT, as well as Ergenekon allegations, who stated that the Turkish state established the PKK and used them. Hezbollah stated that they only provided those statements to show the PKK what it felt like to constantly be falsely accused, and also stated that "the PKK must stop using 'the state founded' or 'the state used Hezbollah' language", and "neither the PKK was founded by the state, nor Hezbollah. Neither the PKK is a collaborator with the state, nor Hezbollah."

The PKK often exaggerated links between Turkey and Hezbollah, and called Hezbollah "Hizbulkontra" to further discredit it. However, illegal Turkish operations included false flag operations for both the PKK and Hezbollah, and the PKK itself had been infiltrated by Turkish agents many times. Hezbollah claimed that the PKK was run by communists at the highest rank of the Turkish deep state.

In a 2012 interview, Cemîl Bayik stated "we do not have intentions to disrespect or start any confrontation, tension, conflict and hatred against the Hezbollah. Although there have been very deep pains and heavy costs in the past, we are still not turning it into a feud. What is important to us is the freedom and interests of our people. This is how we approach." Hezbollah praised Bayik and his statement, although they criticised how the PKK speaks on behalf of the Kurdish people while excluding Hezbollah, and they claimed that whatever the PKK "called an 'enemy' yesterday, turned into a 'friend' today, what it called 'friend' today, it can declare an 'enemy' tomorrow". Hezbollah also stated that "although the messages given by Cemil Bayik are honey which is partially poisoned, our wish and hope is that the honey wins and overpowers the poison effect."

In 2013, Hezbollah supporters and PKK supporters in Dicle University clashed for 3 days after provocative leaflets were dropped. The Free Cause Party chairman Hüseyin Yılmaz accused Turks of instigating between both sides, and stated that "The PKK-Hezbollah conflict is purposely wanted to be created." Yılmaz claimed that the Free Cause Party supported the 2013–2015 PKK–Turkey peace process, and stated that a permanent ceasefire between the PKK and Hezbollah was even more important to them. HDP politician Altan Tan also supported this and said that "the PKK-Hezbollah conflict should be prevented at all costs. There are people that insistently want this." Tan also called for the end of the tension between Free Cause Party supporters and HDP supporters.

In late 2014, PKK sympathisers and Hezbollah sympathisers clashed in Diyarbakır, in which 10 people died. Hezbollah published a statement saying "In the name of Allah, we have repeatedly announced to the public that we do not want a conflict with the PKK, that we are not advocates of this conflict, and that our Muslim people have suffered great harm from such a conflict. However, despite this policy, there was fighting between us, which was as a result of the PKK's provocation which left us no other alternative way. Just like how the PKK is the initiator of this conflict, it is they who abused it and caused it to spread and harm the people of Kurdistan. Because of this, we have no reason to criticise ourselves or apologize. The guilty apologizes, asks for forgiveness. Since it is the PKK that is guilty, they are the ones who must apologize and ask for forgiveness." İsa Altsoy, while speaking on the clashes, referred to the dead Hezbollah supporters as "martyrs", and claimed that "it does not seem possible to effectively and permanently solve the problems unless the PKK accepts Hezbollah as a legitimate power of Kurdistan instead of seeing Hezbollah as an enemy it wants to eliminate".

== Conflict with Turkey ==
Although Turkish authorities arrested over 1,550 Hezbollah members between 1992 and 1996, while also arresting PKK members, they ignored the war going on between the PKK and Hezbollah, in hopes that both factions fight each other until neither group had the power to continue the Kurdish–Turkish conflict. However, because of Hüseyin Velioğlu's increasing Kurdish nationalism, the Hezbollah's ceasefire with the PKK, the Hezbollah's increasing presence among Kurds in southeast Turkey, as well as the growing hostility from Hezbollah towards Turkey, the Turkish authorities could not ignore Hezbollah anymore, and arrested more than 6,000 of their members from 1997 to 2000. Many Kurdish Hezbollah members were kidnapped by JİTEM and never seen again.

Turkish authorities accused Hezbollah militants of dressing like Suleymancis or Nurcus (a group they frequently targeted), and impersonating them in public to avoid being suspected of terrorism.

Turkish authorities cracked down on Hezbollah and began tracking their movements. Hezbollah leadership, on high alert, began executing any of their members who they suspected of being informants for Turkey or the MİT. Hezbollah increased their hit-and-run attacks against Turkish authorities and civilians.

Turkish intelligence stated that the Kurdistan Islamic Movement (HIK) and the PKK helped Hezbollah throughout the insurgency. A Turkish police chief even referred to PKK and Hezbollah as being different fingers on the same hand. In 1998, Turkish authorities alleged that Hüseyin Velioğlu and a significant amount of Hezbollah fighters had travelled to Iraqi Kurdistan and received training from the Kurdistan Islamic Movement (IMK) under Osman Abdulaziz to later use against Turkey. At that time, Mullah Krekar had been the IMK military commander. Prior to its disarmament and registration as a political party in the KRG in 2005, the IMK was a very powerful armed group in Iraqi Kurdistan, and formed the Islamic Emirate of Kurdistan, which Mullah Krekar seized in 2001. Adham Barzani provided training to Hüseyin Velioğlu and 300 Kurdish Hezbollah militants in the city of Soran in 1999.

After the arrest of Abdullah Öcalan in 1999, Turkish authorities began focusing on Hüseyin Velioğlu, whose location was unknown due to him constantly moving around before anyone notices.

During the 1990s, Hezbollah had committed around 593 murders and 43 kidnappings. In 1998 they kidnapped and later killed the Islamic feminist activist Konca Kuriş. They also kidnapped Nurcu activist İzzettin Yıldırım while he was preparing for tarawih on December 29, 1999. His dead body was found in a Hezbollah cell house during the 2000 Istanbul raids.

The 1993 killing of Uğur Mumcu was blamed on both the PKK and Hezbollah. Mustafa Karasu alleged that Mumcu was killed by the Turkish state in order to prevent his spreading the fact that the PKK had been infiltrated by the MİT.

During the beginning of the year 2000, Turkish authorities launched the 2000 Istanbul raids, in which they killed Hüseyin Velioğlu, leading to the decline of Hezbollah. The Turkish government later launched a huge crackdown in which they arrested over 15,000 of the estimated 20,000 Hezbollah members. According to Turkey, Hüseyin Velioğlu was in Iran for a period of time and had returned to Turkey 2 months before the raids. Years later, American tech company IBM extracted files from undamaged hard drives from computers which Edip Gümüş attempt to destroy during the shootout with Turkish police in Beykoz. IBM sent the files to a Diyarbakır court. A Turkish parliamentary report revealed that in 1995, 400–500 Kurdish teenagers had been sent by Hezbollah to Iran for military training, in preparation for an offensive against Turkish forces.

The Kurdish Hezbollah claimed that their ceasefire with the PKK and the reconciliation between Velioğlu and Öcalan was what caused Turkey to take them serious.

The last major attack of Kurdish Hezbollah, and possible retaliation for the killing of Hüseyin Velioğlu, was the 2001 assassination of Gaffar Okkan, a Turkish police officer stationed in Diyarbakır, whom they had given death threats earlier, in which 5 other police officers were killed.

The Turkish state cracked down on Hezbollah in mosques, in which led to almost all mosques being cleared of Hezbollah activity. Thousands of Kurdish sheikhs accused of giving pro-Hezbollah lectures were given prison sentences. Hezbollah recruitment had diminished. Hezbollah members who weren't arrested began hiding in large numbers, and hundreds of high-ranking Hezbollah members had fled to Iraq, Syria, or Europe before they could be arrested. A Hezbollah member who went into hiding admitted how he had to carry a pocket-size copy of Risale-i Nur so that the Turkish police would not accuse him of being a Hezbollah member. Hezbollah members who were arrested claimed to have been tortured by Turkish authorities, with the claims of torture being mentioned in Urgent Actions (UA) of Amnesty International.

In 2002, under İsa Altsoy, the Kurdish Hezbollah ended its armed activities and began focusing on charity work for the Kurdish poor, as part of various rebranded organizations.

By 2005, the AKP government had conducted 260 operations against Hezbollah, capturing 402 militants, despite the allegations made by AKP critics who claimed that the AKP would tolerate Islamist militant groups.

On April 27, 2009, Turkish police raided a Hezbollah house in Elazığ, in their largest operation against the group since Istanbul 2000, in which they found a video of the murder of İzzettin Yıldırım.

In 2011, Recep Tayyip Erdoğan, during a speech in Batman, which had a heavy Kurdish Hezbollah presence, took the risk of takfiring the group and saying that they are a mere terrorist group. Meral Akşener many years later stated that Erdoğan "has the PKK in his left hand, and the Hezbollah in his right."

In March 2022, Turkish police belonging to the Anti-Terrorism Branch Directorate raided 4 houses in 3 districts of Istanbul, and arrested 3 people in raids against Hezbollah, the Islamic State, and İBDA-C.

The Kurdish Hezbollah had diverse members, ranging from the vast majority who were Sunni, to Twelver Shia and Salafi minorities. The Kurdish Hezbollah, despite its toleration for other Islamic sects, continued to oppose and target the Nur movement. Hüseyin Velioğlu managed to keep the different factions united by emphasising their shared Kurdish Muslim identity, and by avoiding sectarianism. After Velioğlu's death and the rupture of Hezbollah, the Sunnis either joined the various Hezbollah rebranded organizations or left Turkey, while the Shia and Salafi minorities returned to their normal lives. Many of the members who left Turkey started reorganising in Europe, especially Germany, and began opening Hezbollah rebranded organizations, as well as pro-Hezbollah mosques.

== Legacy ==
Niyazi Palabıyık, the police chief who led the raids on Hezbollah in 2000 in Istanbul, while recalling on the incidents, referred to Hezbollah as "a very barbaric organisation".

After Hezbollah ended its armed activities in 2002, former Hezbollah members created the "Solidarity with the Oppressed" (Mustazaflar ile Dayanışma Derneği or Mustazaf Der) in 2003. It also became known as the Movement of the Oppressed (Turkish: Mustazaflar Hareketi). Mustazaf Der was active in organizing mass meetings in Kurdish cities to celebrate Muhammad's birthday (Mawlid). On 20 April 2010 a court in Diyarbakır ordered the closure of Mustazaf-Der on the grounds that it was "conducting activities on behalf of the terrorist organization Hizbollah." The decision was confirmed by the Court of Cassation on 11 May 2012. In December 2012, a political party known as the Free Cause Party was founded. In 2022, the Büro-İş Union appealed to the Turkish Supreme Court to close the Free Cause Party due to its alleged Hezbollah background and its many alleged violations of the Turkish constitution. The Free Cause Party was attacked many times by Turkish nationalists. The Free Cause Party remained relatively unknown until they suddenly gained infamy during the 2023 Turkish elections when they joined the People's Alliance of President Erdoğan and became a controversial topic. Free Cause Party members were later beaten in Trabzon in 2023, in which Zekeriya Yapıcıoğlu stated that the attack was incited by Ümit Özdağ, and announced that he had filed criminal complaints against Özdağ. Again in 2023, the Free Cause Party came under controversy due to Yapıcıoğlu claiming that Hezbollah and the PKK are not terrorist groups. The Free Cause Party claimed that they have no connection to Hezbollah, and that they are not a continuation of them nor their political wing. Binali Yıldırım, Süleyman Soylu, and Devlet Bahçeli have also claimed that the Free Cause Party has no connection with the designated terrorist organization Hezbollah. The HDP and the Free Cause Party, which are both accused of being the PKK and Hezbollah's political wings, also had a rivalry, although on February 26, 2024, the Batman provincial leaders for the DEM Party and Free Cause Party were seen together at a Batman Petrolspor match, which they posted on their social media accounts. Kurdish nationalists celebrated the event, calling for a permanent reconciliation between the parties.
