= List of Kurdish organisations =

The following is a list of Kurdish Organisations.

== Europe ==
=== UK ===
- Kurdish PEN
- Peace Mothers

=== Sweden ===
- Kurdish Student Academic Association

=== France ===
- Kurdish Institute of Paris
- Kurdistan Islamic Society

=== Belgium ===
- European Kurdish Democratic Societies Congress, previously known as Confederation of Kurdish Associations (KON-KURD)
- Kurdish Institute of Brussels

=== Germany ===
- Kurdistan Islamic Society

== Middle East ==
Diagram of Kurdish organisations and their relations

=== Iraq ===
- Action Party for the Independence of Kurdistan
- Democratic Patriotic Alliance of Kurdistan
- Gorran Movement
- Hawpa
- Islamic Fayli Grouping in Iraq
- Islamic Group Kurdistan
  - Islamic Kurdish Society
- Islamic Movement of Kurdistan
- Islamic Kurdish League
- Kurdish Revolutionary Hezbollah
- Kurdish Tribal Association
- Kurdistan Communist Party
- Kurdistan Democratic Party (KDP)
- Kurdistan Islamic Union
- Kurdistan Toilers' Party
- Kurdish Socialist Party
- Kurdistan Conservative Party
- Kurdistan National Democratic Union
- Kurdistan Socialist Democratic Party
- Kurdistan Revolutionary Party
- Patriotic Union of Kurdistan (PUK)

=== Iran ===
- Kurdish Hezbollah of Iran
- Organization of Iranian Kurdistan Struggle
- Salvation Force
- Kurdistan Democratic Party of Iran (KDPI)
- Kurdistan Free Life Party (PJAK)
  - Eastern Kurdistan Units (YRK)
  - Women's Defence Forces (HPJ)
- Komalah
- Kurdish United Front
- Kurdistan Freedom Party (PAK)
- Kurdistan Independence Alliance (HSK)
- Kurdistan Independence Mouvement (BSK)

=== Lebanon ===
- Kurdish Democratic Party
- Razkari Party

=== Turkey ===
- Communist Party of Kurdistan (KKP)
- Democracy Party (DEP)
- Democratic People's Party (DEHAP)
- Democratic Society Party (DTP)
- Hereketa İslamiya Kurdistan (HİK)
- Kurdish Hizbollah
- Islamic Party of Kurdistan (PİK)
- Kurdistan Communities Union (KCK)
- Kurdistan Democratic Party/North (KDP/Bakur)
- Kurdistan Workers' Party (PKK)
- People's Defence Forces (HPG)
- National Liberation Front of Kurdistan (ERNK)
- Peace and Democracy Party (BDP)
- Democratic Regions Party (DBP)
- Peoples' Democratic Party (HDP)
- People's Democracy Party (HADEP)
- Peoples' Equality and Democracy Party (DEM)
- People's Labor Party (HEP)
- Revolutionary Party of Kurdistan (PŞK)
- Rights and Freedoms Party (HAK-PAR)
- Society for the Rise of Kurdistan
- Xoybûn (CSK)
- Workers Vanguard Party of Kurdistan (PPKK)
- Kurdistan Freedom Hawks (TAK)
- Marxist–Leninist Communist Party (MLKP)
- DHKP/C
- Communist Party of Turkey/Marxist–Leninist (TKP/ML)
- Revolutionary Headquarter
- Communist Labour Party of Turkey/Leninist (TKEP/L)
- Patriotic Revolutionary Youth Movement (YDG-H)
- Civil Protection Units (YPS)
- Civil Protection Units-Women (YPS-Jin)
- Kurdistan Freedom Militia (MAK)

=== Syria ===
- Kurdish National Alliance in Syria (HNKS)
- Syrian Democratic Council (SDC)
- Democratic Union Party (Syria) (PYD)
- Movement for a Democratic Society (TEV-DEM)
- People's Protection Units (YPG)
- Women's Protection Units (YPJ)
- Asayish
- Kurdish National Council (ENKS)
- Kurdish Islamic Front
- Movement of Salah al-Din the Kurd
- Kurdistan Democratic Party of Syria (KDP-S)
- Kurdish Supreme Committee
- Kurdish Democratic Political Union
- Euphrates Volcano
- Jabhat al-Akrad
- United Freedom Forces
