= Kurdish Hezbollah of Iran =

Kurdish political party in Iran

Kurdish Hezbollah of Iran (Kurdish: حیزبوڵڵای کوردی ئیران; Persian: حزب‌الله کرد ایران) is an Islamist political party created in Iran in 1983 under the leadership of Sheikh Mohammed Khalid Barzani. Kurdish Hezbollah of Iran is very close to the Islamic Republic of Iran, and is not a nationalist or leftist organization like most other Kurdish parties in Iran. Qadir Osman, the leader of this party, said "our friendship with Iran is very good and there are visits among us". Adham Barzani, within this group and under his control, established Kurdish Revolutionary Hezbollah, an offshoot of the Kurdish Hezbollah of Iran.

== See also ==
- Ittihadul Ulema (Union of Islamic Scholars and Schools)
- Kurdish separatism in Iran (1918–present)
  - Iran–PJAK conflict (2004–present)
- Kurdish–Iraqi conflict (1918–present)
- Kurdish–Syrian conflict (2012–present)
- Kurdish–Turkish conflict (1921–present)
  - Human rights of Kurdish people in Turkey
  - Kurdistan Workers' Party insurgency (1978–2025)
  - Timeline of Kurdish uprisings
- List of illegal political parties in Turkey
- People killed by Kurdish Hezbollah
  - Konca Kuris, Turkish feminist, one of Hezbollah's victims
- Shia Islamism

=== Kurdish Islamism ===
- Great Eastern Islamic Raiders' Front (İBDA-C)
  - Salih Mirzabeyoğlu
  - State of Grandsublime
- Islamic Emirate of Kurdistan (1994–2003)
- Kurdish Hezbollah of Turkey
- Kurdistan Islamic Movement (Turkey)
- Kurdistan Revolutionary Hezbollah

=== Kurdish unionism ===
- Kurdistan independence movement
  - Abdullah Öcalan
    - Imprisonment in Turkey (1999–present)
  - Democratic confederalism
  - Kurdistan Communities Union (KCK)
  - Kurdistan Free Life Party (PJAK)
  - Kurdistan Workers' Party (PKK)
