= Hezbollah (disambiguation) =

Hezbollah is a Shi'a Islamist political party and paramilitary organization in Lebanon.

Hezbollah may also refer to:

== Afghanistan ==
- Hizbullah Afghan, Afghan Taliban politician and military officer
- Hezbollah Afghanistan, a former rebel group and later political party in Afghanistan.
- Liwa Fatemiyoun, alternatively called "Hezbollah Afghanistan" and closely connected to the party of that name.

== Azerbaijan ==
- Islamic Resistance Movement of Azerbaijan, nicknamed "Azerbaijani Hezbollah"

== Indonesia ==
- Hizbullah (Indonesia), an Indonesian militant group that was active during Indonesian National Revolution

== Iran ==
- Kurdish Hezbollah of Iran, a Kurdish Islamist party
- Hezbollah Organization, a militant organization in Iran that aimed to overthrow the Pahlavi dynasty
- Hezbollah (Iran), a general name used to refer to pro-establishment forces in the Islamic Republic of Iran
- Ansar-e Hezbollah, a quasi-clandestine organization of a paramilitary character that performs vigilante duties
- Hezbollah fraction, a parliamentary group active between 1996 and 2000
- Hezbollah Assembly, a parliamentary group active between 1996 and 2000
- Independent Hezbollah deputies, a parliamentary group active between 1996 and 2000

== Iraq ==
- Hezbollah Movement in Iraq, a Shi'a Islamist political party in Iraq aligned with the Supreme Islamic Council of Iraq
- Harakat Hezbollah al-Nujaba, a Shi'a Islamist paramilitary group in Iraq
- Kata'ib Hezbollah (also known as the Hezbollah Brigades), a Shi'a Islamist paramilitary group in Iraq
- Kurdish Revolutionary Hezbollah, an Iraqi Kurdish Islamist group that was disbanded in 2004

== Mauritius ==
- Mauritian Solidarity Front, a political party in Mauritius that was formerly known until 2004 as Hizbullah (Party of God)

== Pakistan ==
- Liwa Zainebiyoun, a Pakistani group which broke off from Liwa Fatemiyoun

== Saudi Arabia ==
- Hezbollah Al-Hejaz, a Shi'a militant organization operating in Saudi Arabia, Lebanon, Kuwait and Bahrain

== Syria ==
- Syrian Hezbollah, the Syrian branch of Lebanese Hezbollah (2012–2024)

== Turkey ==
- Kurdish Hezbollah, a Kurdish Sunni Islamist group, known in Turkey as "Hizbullah"

== See also ==
- Hasbullah, an unrelated male given name
- "Hizbollah", track on Ministry's 1988 album The Land of Rape and Honey
- Hezbollah International Financing Prevention Act of 2014, a US bill putting sanctions on financiers and institutions related to Hezbollah in Lebanon
