= Kurdistan Islamic Movement (Turkey) =

Socio-political movement in Turkey

Hereketa İslamiya Kurdistane
- Formation: 1993
- Founder: Seyda Mele Abdullah
- Dissolved: 2004, merged with the Kurdistan Islamic Community (CÎK)
- Type: Kurdish Islamist socio-political movement
- Headquarters: Southeastern Turkey
- Region served: Turkey
- Official language: Kurdish, Turkish
- Leader: Seyda Mele Abdullah

Hereketa İslamiya Kurdistane was a Kurdish Sunni Islamist socio-political movement, formerly based in Southeastern Turkey. It was established in 1993 and led by Seyda Mele Abdullah. The group merged with the Kurdistan Islamic Community (CÎK), a pro-PKK faction, in 2004. It was not listed as part of the 12 active terrorist organizations in Turkey as of 2007 due to it not being active, although it was formerly designated as a terrorist organization by the Turkish government before.

== See also ==
- Ittihadul Ulema (Union of Islamic Scholars and Schools)
- Kurdish separatism in Iran (1918–present)
  - Iran–PJAK conflict (2004–present)
- Kurdish–Iraqi conflict (1918–present)
- Kurdish–Syrian conflict (2012–present)
- Kurdish–Turkish conflict (1921–present)
  - Human rights of Kurdish people in Turkey
  - Kurdistan Workers' Party insurgency (1978–2025)
  - Timeline of Kurdish uprisings
- List of illegal political parties in Turkey
- People killed by Kurdish Hezbollah
  - Konca Kuris, Turkish feminist, one of Hezbollah's victims
- Shia Islamism

=== Kurdish Islamism ===
- Great Eastern Islamic Raiders' Front (İBDA-C)
  - Salih Mirzabeyoğlu
  - State of Grandsublime
- Islamic Emirate of Kurdistan (1994–2003)
- Kurdish Hezbollah of Iran
- Kurdish Hezbollah of Turkey
- Kurdistan Revolutionary Hezbollah

=== Kurdish unionism ===
- Kurdistan independence movement
  - Abdullah Öcalan
    - Imprisonment in Turkey (1999–present)
  - Democratic confederalism
  - Kurdistan Communities Union (KCK)
  - Kurdistan Free Life Party (PJAK)
  - Kurdistan Workers' Party (PKK)
