= Kurdistan Revolutionary Hezbollah =

- حیزبوڵڵای شۆڕشگێڕی کوردستان
- Leader: Adham Barzani
- Dates active: 1983–2003 (militarily)
- Ideology: Kurdish nationalism Kurdish-Islamic synthesis Islamism; Shia–Sunni unity Anti-Ba'athism

The Kurdistan Revolutionary Hezbollah (Kurdish: حیزبوڵڵای شۆڕشگێڕی کوردستان; Arabic: حزب الله الثوري الكردستاني; the Revolutionary Party of God of Kurdistan) is a Kurdish Shia–Sunni Islamist political movement and former militant group founded in Iraqi Kurdistan in 1988 under the leadership of Adham Barzani.

== History ==
The Kurdistan Revolutionary Hezbollah was founded in 1983 under the leadership of Adham Barzani. It was a militant group that fought against the Ba'athist government during the Iran–Iraq War. It was close to the SCIRI. After the overthrow of Saddam Hussein, the group was inactive as its fighters felt they had nothing else to fight. In 1999, the KRH trained militants of the Kurdish Hezbollah of Hüseyin Velioğlu in the city of Soran, Iraq.

In early 2024, amid an increase of attacks by the Islamic Resistance in Iraq, IRGC channels claimed that the KRH was remobilising to attack American and Israeli interests in the Kurdistan Region. In late 2024, there were further reports of the KRH remobilising after more than twenty years of inactivity, although Adham Barzani distanced himself from the claims.

== See also ==
- Ittihadul Ulema (Union of Islamic Scholars and Schools)
- Kurdish separatism in Iran (1918–present)
  - Iran–PJAK conflict (2004–present)
- Kurdish–Iraqi conflict (1918–present)
- Kurdish–Syrian conflict (2012–present)
- Kurdish–Turkish conflict (1921–present)
  - Human rights of Kurdish people in Turkey
  - Kurdistan Workers' Party insurgency (1978–2025)
  - Timeline of Kurdish uprisings
- List of illegal political parties in Turkey
- People killed by Kurdish Hezbollah
  - Konca Kuris, Turkish feminist, one of Hezbollah's victims
- Shia Islamism

=== Kurdish Islamism ===
- Great Eastern Islamic Raiders' Front (İBDA-C)
  - Salih Mirzabeyoğlu
  - State of Grandsublime
- Islamic Emirate of Kurdistan (1994–2003)
- Kurdish Hezbollah of Iran
- Kurdish Hezbollah of Turkey
- Kurdistan Islamic Movement (Turkey)

=== Kurdish unionism ===
- Kurdistan independence movement
  - Abdullah Öcalan
    - Imprisonment in Turkey (1999–present)
  - Democratic confederalism
  - Kurdistan Communities Union (KCK)
  - Kurdistan Free Life Party (PJAK)
  - Kurdistan Workers' Party (PKK)

== Bibliography ==
- The Middle East and North Africa. Routledge 2003, ISBN 1-85743-184-7, p. 515 (online copy, p. 515, at Google Books)
