= Great East (ideology) =

The Great East (Turkish: Büyük Doğu) is an Islamist ideology from Turkey that was put forward by Necip Fazıl Kısakürek.

Necip Fazıl explained the outline of the Great East ideology in his works, around the basic thesis of "renewing the understanding of Islam", he used political, cultural, moral, and intellectual reasoning and put forward an "ideal Islamic state". The "ideal Islamic state" today is represented by the İBDA-C concept known as the "State of Grandsublime".

The Great East ideology, which places Islam at the center of its basic references, has become an modernist ideology that was used by Islamist intellectuals who grew up during the One-party period of the Republic of Turkey. After Necip Fazıl, the Great East ideology was carried by Salih Mirzabeyoğlu, the İBDA-C founder and a convicted terrorist of Kurdish origin. The İBDA-C aims to overthrow Turkey and form the "State of Grandsublime" (Turkish: Başyücelik Devleti).

== Concepts ==
According to Necip Fazıl, Islam cannot be restricted to any place because it belongs everywhere. However, accepting the "East-West" distinction is merely a forced and realistic attitude to express the sides of the east–west struggle that appears in Islamic history. According to him, while Islam, which is a truth independent of time and place, wanted to spread all over the world, it was the West that made itself an enemy to it, thus two opposing sides emerged, the East and the West. The Great East ideology is strongly Anti-Western and claims that the East is superior to the West in every way.

== Principles ==
Necip Fazıl bases the Great East ideology on nine principles:

1. Spirituality: It is a character of the Great East, based on Sufism.

2. Arbitrariness: It emphasizes essentialism.

3. Individuality: It is the view that only individuals, not an entire society, can represent the truth. It is the opposite of generalization.

4. Morality: It expresses that the Great East idealizes Islamic morality and is committed to it.

5. Nationalism: It is the principle of the Great East ideology that emphasizes one's pride and loyalty towards the State of Grandsublime and the Great East ideology, not pride and loyalty towards a specific race or ethnic group. It also emphasises beliefs, values, thoughts and pride in the various nations of the East. It is against racism, ultranationalism, and cosmopolitanism.

6. Capital and property: While protecting and respecting one's right to their own property, it advocates regulating capital and welfare by allowing the State to spread them to society.

7. Socialization: It emphasises establishing a society that gives its individuals a sense of solidarity, belonging and responsibility, as well as participation.

8. Law and order: It emphasises the importance of discipline and behavior in public.

9. Interventionism: It is the principle of involving oneself in stopping all disorder and tyranny in society.
