= İzzettin Yıldırım =

Kurdish activist

İzzettin Yıldırım (c.1946 - between December 29, 1999 and January 17, 2000) was a Kurdish Nurcu activist from Turkey, and the leader of Zehra Nur Movement, who was assassinated by Kurdish Hezbollah.

== Life ==
He was born in 1946 in the Kızılkaya village of Patnos District of Ağrı Province. His father, Tahir Yıldırım, who was an imam, died when İzzettin was very young. After completing his primary school education in his village, he studied at various madrasahs in various provinces. He began reading the Risale-i Nur of Said Nursî, and decided to become a Nurcu. Then he came to Istanbul to complete his military service. In 1990, together with his close friends Zekeriya Özbek, Hüseyin Daşkın, Gıyaseddin Bingöl and Yasin Yıldırım, he founded the Zehra Education and Culture Foundation, known as Med-Zehra.

Yıldırım was kidnapped by while preparing for tarawih on December 29, 1999. No news about him came for weeks. The body of Yıldırım was found in a Hezbollah cell house in Ümraniye as part of the 2000 Istanbul raids.

On Tuesday, February 1, 2000, he was buried in Eyüp Cemetery. Tens of thousands of people attended the funeral. The tens of thousands who attended the funeral demanded justice for his assassination.

On April 27, 2009, Turkish police raided a house believed to be operated by Hezbollah, in Elazig, in the biggest operation against Hezbollah since Beykoz Operation. During the search, a video of the murder of Yıldırım was seized that indicated he was murdered after days of torture. Yıldırım was murdered by the hogtie method, one of Hezbollah's signature methods.
