= 2000 Istanbul raids =

Turkish raids on safehouses operated by the Kurdish Hezbollah

- Part of the Kurdish–Turkish conflict, the Kurdish Hezbollah insurgency
Date	January 17, 2000
Location	Main raid: Kavacık, Beykoz other raids: Üsküdar and Ümraniye
Result	Turkish victory: Death of Kurdish Hezbollah's leader; Arrest of around 75% of Kurdish Hezbollah's membership, and a decline of the group

Belligerents
Turkey	Kurdish Hezbollah

Commanders and leaders
(Turkey) Bülent Ecevit (Turkey) Niyazi Palabıyık	Hüseyin Velioğlu †; Edip Gümüş (POW); Cemal Tutar (POW)

Units involved
General Directorate of Security: PÖH; Intelligence Directorate	Military wing

The 2000 Istanbul raids (Turkish: 2000 İstanbul baskınları) were Turkish raids on safehouses operated by the Kurdish Hezbollah on January 17, 2000. The raids resulted in the death of Hüseyin Velioğlu, and severely weakened Hezbollah. The main raid was in Beykoz, while other raids were done in Üsküdar and Ümraniye. The raids were described as being the events that marked the beginning of Hezbollah's “decline”.

== Background ==
Following increasing tensions between the Hezbollah and Turkey, Niyazi Palabıyık, who was the Deputy Chief of Police, of the Intelligence Branch Directorate of the Turkish General Directorate of Security during the premiership of Bülent Ecevit, was the leader of the raid. A few days before the raid, he spoke against rebel groups and stated “look at a person's hand, after the hand comes the fingers. If the PKK is the thumb, the index finger is Hezbollah! The main purpose of these is to establish a state through Kurdish nationalism.” A villa on Mühendis Street in Kavacık in Beykoz was found before the operation, and it was confirmed to be an operations center operated by Hezbollah, it was also confirmed that in the house were Hüseyin Velioğlu, the general leader of Hezbollah, as well as Edip Gümüş, the leader of Hezbollah's military wing, and Cemal Tutar, a high-ranking member of the military wing. It was the main target of the raid. According to Palabıyık, Gümüş alone was responsible for the deaths of over 250 Turkish civilians, businessmen, law enforcement, and activists.

== Raids ==
Niyazi Palabayık announced that the Turkish police “pressed the button” on January 17, 2000 and raided the Beykoz villa. They had a meeting at the police station before the raid. After coming to a conclusion that it was a cell house belonging to Hezbollah, they started the operation. The police were instantly met with heavy bullets as they came near the house. Velioğlu engaged in a shootout with the police as they entered the house, and was shot to death alongside another Hezbollah member. The police left, while Gümüş and Tutar attempted to destroy the technology in the house in an attempt to destroy evidence. The police returned and arrested them. The police later took out the memory cards, which were undamaged, and, with the help of IBM, extracted 180 thousand pages of documents, which included Hezbollah's future plans against Turkey, as well as previous crimes which included murders, kidnappings, and tortures. It also included information on Hezbollah's structure.

After questioning Gümüş and Tutar, the Turkish police raided a Hezbollah cell house in Üsküdar, finding bomb-making materials, and 10 dead bodies buried by making a pig bond and covered in concrete. One of the bodies had a nail in his skull, some bodies had their arms and legs broken or removed, and all showed signs of torture.

At a raid on a Hezbollah cell house in Ümraniye, the body of İzzettin Yıldırım was found. On a separate raid on April 27, 2009, Turkish police found a video of the murder of İzzettin Yıldırım, which showed signs of his torture for days before his murder. Yıldırım was murdered by the pig bond method as well.

After the raids, more than 200 graves were found in Hezbollah cell houses.

== Aftermath ==
On April 2, 2019, the house was put up for sale for 2,142,000 Turkish lira after being abandoned for 19 years.
