= KSAF =

KSAF may refer to:

- KSAF (association), Kurdish Student Academic Association, Sweden
- KSAF-LP, a radio station (104.1 FM) licensed to Minot, North Dakota, United States
- The ICAO code for Santa Fe Municipal Airport near Santa Fe, New Mexico, United States
