= Konca =

Konca may refer to:

== Given name ==
- Konca Kuris (1960–1998), Turkish feminist who was murdered in Konya, Turkey

== Surname ==
- Ali Haydar Konca (born 1950), Turkish politician
- Ender Konca (born 1947), Turkish footballer

== Place name ==
- Konca, the Hungarian name for Cunţa village, Șpring Commune, Alba County, Romania
