= Faik Bulut =

Kurdish journalist

Faik Bulut (born 1950, Kağızman, Kars) is a Kurdish journalist, historian, political commentator, and writer from Turkey.

== Biography ==
Bulut was born in 1950 in Kağızman. He graduated from Gazi University in Ankara and started his career as a journalist in 1985. Following the coup d'etat of March 12, 1971, he left Turkey and lived in various countries in the Middle East for 8 years. Currently he is a public commentator for foreign TV channels and an investigative journalist for The Independent Turkish. He speaks Turkish, Kurdish, English, Arabic and French.

== Views on Marco Polo ==
According to Faik Bulut, what Marco Polo wrote about Order of Assassins does not reflect the truth and what he told in his memoirs:

Hasan Sabbah has turned a valley and has never been in it before. had turned it into a garden full of unseen fruits. The most elegant palaces and mansions imaginable were built in it. And there were gutters where wine, milk, honey and water flowed freely. There were many of the world's most beautiful female concubines who could play all kinds of musical instruments well and sing, dance to enchant the beholder, and they believed that the Muslims of these regions were Paradise.

According to Bulut all of the above claims are false, and the opinions of other scientists also support him in this regard. According to Bulut, it had been 15 years since Alamut Castle was destroyed by Mongols at the time Marco Polo claimed to have gone there. Bulut emphasizes that Polo's writings are only legends he heard from sailors while in prison in Italy.

== Journalism ==
Bulut has published articles, participated in interviews, and been invited to TV & radio shows, such as CNN, BBC, The Independent Turkish, DW, and Sputnik News Turkey, referenced by many authors and post graduation thesis in Turkey and globally.

== Works ==
Faik Bulut researches Alevism, the Kurds, Palestine and the Palestine Liberation Organization (PLO), the Ottoman Empire, the Middle East and Islamic history, among other topics. Bulut has authored nearly 40 books; he has an h-index of 13 and an i10-index of 18. As of 2026, his writings has been cited by academic articles 642 times since 1994 according to Google Scholar.

=== Alevism history ===
- Alevism without Ali, Berfin Publishing, 2011
- Hasan Sabbah Truth and Equalist Dervishan Republics, Berfin Publishing, 2014
- Islamic Communists: (Qarmatians)
- Abu Muslim Khorasani
- Whose Dormitory is Khorasan?
- How did We Come From Khorasan: The Road Story of Alevis, 2019

=== Middle East ===
- Fading Colors of the Middle East (Yazidis, Circassians, Bedouins, Nusayris)
- Palestine Dream (Memoir)
- Palestine Intifada Lessons
- Sharia In The Shadow Algeria
- Iraq Invasion from Arab's Eyes

=== Kurds ===
- Kurdish Revolts in the Eye of the State
- Kurds in the Turkish Press
- Seeking a Solution to the Kurdish Question
- Dersim Reports
- Three Rebellions in a Narrow Triangle: Ethnic Conflicts in Kurdistan
- Kurdish Diplomacy (2 volumes)
- History of the Kurdish Language
- By the Pen of Ahmede Xane: The Unknown World of the Kurds (Second place in the 1995 Musa Anter Research Award)

=== Islamic and Islamic organizations ===
- Democracy in the State of Allah: A Critique of the Sharia Order (1993 Turan Dursun Research Award)
- Islamist Organizations (3 volumes)
- Turkish Army and Religion: Islamist Activities in the Eyes of the State (1826 - 2007)
- Code Name: Hezbollah
- Who is this Fethullah Gülen?
- The Rise of Sect Capital 1: Criticism of Islamic economics
- The Rise of Sect Capital 2: Where does the Sect Capital go?
- Secrets of Al-Qaeda
- Religion, Nationalism and Women Debates in Committee of Union and Progress (2 volumes)
- Islam in the Global Age 1: The Western world and Secularism, Cumhuriyet Books
- Islam in the Global Age 2: Woman and Hijab, Cumhuriyet Books
- Islam in the Global Age 3: Sharia and Politics, Cumhuriyet Books
- Sexual Spells in Islam

== See also ==
- Order of Assassins
- Yazidis
