= Gaffar Okkan =

Turkish police chief

Ali Gaffar Okkan
- Born: 1952; Hendek, Sakarya Province, Turkey
- Died: January 24, 2001 (aged 49); Diyarbakır, Turkey
- Police career
- Service years: 1973 – January 24, 2001
- Rank: 1973: Ass. Inspector; 1983: Superintendent; 1985: Chief Superintendent; 1992: Ass. Commissioner; 1993: Commissioner
- Badge no.: 3310

Ali Gaffar Okkan (1952 – January 24, 2001) was a Turkish police chief who was assassinated in an ambush in Diyarbakır, southeastern Turkey.

== Early life ==
Ali Gaffar Okkan was born in Hendek, Sakarya Province in 1952. He was of Georgian descent by his family. He graduated from Police College on September 30, 1970, and attended the Police Academy in Ankara. He completed his education on September 29, 1973.

== Career ==
Okkan was commissioned in the rank of Assistant İnspector (Turkish: Komiser yardımcısı) to İzmir Police Directorate, where he served in many posts until he was then promoted to Superintendent (Turkish: Emniyet amiri) with his appointment to Şanlıurfa in 1983. He became Chief superintendent (Turkish: Şube amiri) in 1985. Later in 1986, Okkan was appointed to Eskişehir on the post of the General Directorate of Security. He was promoted to the rank of Assistant Commissioner (Turkish: Emniyet Müdür Yardımcısı or 2. Sınıf Emniyet Müdürü) in 1992.

On December 6, 1993, Okkan was promoted to Commissioner (Turkish: 1. Sınıf Emniyet Müdürü), the second-highest position in the hierarchy of the police organization in Turkey, and was appointed Police Chief in Kars Province, eastern Turkey.

His next assignment was to Diyarbakır, where there had been a prolonged insurgency by the Kurdistan Workers' Party (PKK) and Kurdish Hezbollah. The area's population had seen undergone considerable emigration abroad.

== Serving in Diyarbakır ==
Soon after his arrival in Diyarbakır, a center of conflict with Kurdish separatists and guerillas, he made an announcement on police radio: "From 3310 (Okkan's badge number) to HQ. Since two days, I have been on inspection in the city, and I realize that my colleagues have no sense of duty. This is my first and last warning." This announcement was a sign of what he was not, the sort of his predecessor police chiefs. One of his first official activities before assuming office was to unblock the street in front of the police headquarters, which was barred to civilians for security reasons. He soon also lifted the security roadblocks within the city and installed surveillance cameras covering critical locations in the city for crime prevention. Okkan used to observe the streets of Diyarbakır on the giant monitor in his office during the evening.

In the chaotic atmosphere of Diyarbakır, police officers preferred to stay in the office for so-called "desk duties", since going out on the streets was seen as very risky. Okkan sent all police officers, male and female, out on the streets, asking them: "What are we afraid of?" He instructed his subordinates to treat the town's citizens with kindness and affection.

=== Social activities ===
The policewomen in Diyarbakır went for the first time with his order in public, and controlled traffic in the city. He deployed two patrolling police cars each occupied with two female officers. The one was tasked to pick up runaway children or to search for lost children, and to deliver them to their parents. The other team helped out the walking-handicapped elderly. Policewomen at the Diyarbakır Airport used to undertake the boarding operations for the elderly, and to escort them to the exit gate. Okkan induced the airport authority to purchase wheelchairs and to put them in service.

In that time, the citizens of Diyarbakır were not accustomed to meet uniformed officers in the streets. They deemed the police consisted of anti-riot vehicles and batons. However, the new police chief was determined to show the good side of the police. This behaviour astonished the people much. The citizens, who almost did not encounter the former police chiefs, met Okkan frequently. They liked him more and more when they got to know him. In a very short time, Okkan managed to create confidence, and made the people believe in his objectives. His motto was "We are for the people. I was ordered to protect life, possessions and honor of the citizens. Here, I came for that."

The football club of Diyarbakır, Diyarbakırspor, had hard times. A fan of the local club, Okkan used to attend all of their home matches without missing any. During the game, he acted as if he was the club's president, not as the police chief, and took care of the team. He used to hug the players and to run around the field with the club flag in the hand for celebration after a goal scored by the home team.

=== Fighting terrorism ===
While Okkan made a significant impression on the citizens through his social projects assisting, among others, the elderly, disabled and runaways, critics insisted such activities exceeded the scope of his duties. However, the public relations specialist did not forget his main duty as a member of law enforcement.

His primary target was the illegal fundamentalist pro-Islamic Kurdish Hezbollah, which is not related to its namesake group in Lebanon. Violent acts by Kurdish Hezbollah were directly mainly at the group's opponents, including PKK sympathisers. On January 17, 2000, the Kurdish Hezbollah's leader Hüseyin Velioğlu was killed in his villa at Beykoz, Istanbul during a raid by the police forces. Okkan played a major role in the crackdown against the Kurdish Hezbollah, in which hundreds of group members were arrested, and more than 150 bodies of murdered victims were found throughout the country. He proved that several unsolved murders had been committed mostly by Hezbollah rebels rather than by security forces.

His colleagues and close friends began to warn Okkan to ride in an armored car. He declined such recommendations with the words "What would the citizens do when I ride an armored car?" One week before his death, he released a list of 26 Hezbollah hitmen at a press conference. And, 45 minutes before the attack on him, he stated in an interview with a journalist that he is not afraid of the Hezbollah. He once said nobody could kill him in Diyarbakır or in his hometown Hendek because the citizens would protect him.

== Assassination ==
On January 24, 2001, Gaffar Okkan left his office at the headquarters for a meeting with the Province Governor Cemil Serhadlı. Around 17:40 local time, as he was underway in his official car escorted by police cars, the convoy was ambushed by unidentified gunmen at a distance of less than 1 km (1,100 yd) from the headquarters in downtown at Sezai Karakoç Boulevard between the Meat & Fish Corp. (Turkish: Et ve Balık Kurumu) building and Eflatun Park. The assailants opened fire with long-barrel rifles and killed Okkan. Three police officers were killed at the spot, two other officers died in a hospital. Four officers were wounded during the attack. The gunmen opened also the door of Okkan's car, and fired a couple of times at point-blank range in order to be sure of his death. There was no mobile phone communication between the assailants, who fled rapidly.

Almost 20 bullets hit the police chief’s head. The names of the officers died in the attack were given as Sabri Gün, Mehmet Sepetçi, Atilla Durmuş, Selahattin Baysoy, Mehmet Kamalı and of the officers wounded as Nuri Bozkurt, Mustafa Dince, Veli Göktepe and Fatih Gökçek.

It was reported that one of the assailants was apparently injured in the following shootout with police. 469 empty Kalashnikov cartridges were found at the crime scene, fired from 16 different rifles. Police searched the area extensively for the perpetrators, and detained several suspects. No militant group claimed responsibility for the assassination. However, the attack was attributed to the Hezbollah, as the main suspect, from which Okkan had received death threats.

Following a state memorial in Diyarbakır, where he was appointed three years ago, Okkan's body was transferred to his hometown, and laid to rest in Hendek.

== Aftermath ==
Okkan's death caused deep sorrow among the citizens of Diyarbakır. A condolence book was placed in the police headquarters. A marketplace salesman wrote in the book "For the first time in our life, we witnessed a police chief gave his mobile phone's number. Can you imagine I felt myself also as a police chief, so comfortable when I visited him in his office without any cause?"

The next day, thousands of mourning Turks and Kurds gathered for an apparently spontaneous mass demonstration in the city to protest the assassination, chanting slogans condemning the attack. The people marched to the governor's office building, where they held a moment of silence, paying their tribute before the coffins of the murdered police officers draped in Turkish flag.

In a press meeting held in Konak Square, İzmir, the People's Democracy Party (HADEP), a Kurdish nationalist political party, condemned the assassination, demanded immediate capture of the attackers, and insisted the parliament set up an investigative committee.

During the Ergenekon trials in August 2008, a former member of PKK, who became a turned-informant, claimed that JİTEM (for Gendarmerie Intelligence and Counter-Terrorism), a secret illegal unit formed under the gendarmerie, had carried out the 2001 assassination. He gave the rationale that JİTEM could operate in the region easily before Okkan's appointment. He added that Kurdish Hezbollah had never attacked a state official before, even though they had been investigated by Okkan. In 2011, a police officer, who was wounded in the 2001 attack as one of Okkan's guards, also suspected JİTEM of staging the assassination.

The investigation culminated with the apprehension of two suspects who were later tried before Diyarbakır's 5th High Criminal Court and, in 2010, found guilty of involvement in the assassination. The court further stated that the attack was prepared a long time before by professional killers and that the planners as well as their connection abroad could not be traced back.

== Legacy ==
Following the assassination, many families in Diyarbakır named their newborn sons Ali Gaffar or Gaffar Okkan, after their city's much-beloved public figure. In 2011, 101 namesake boys from Diyarbakır visited Okkan's grave in Hendek to pay respect to him in a memorial ceremony in presence of Okkan's wife and daughter on the 10th anniversary of his death as part of a project called "Journey of Hearts: Martyr Ali Gaffar Okkan, A Story of Brotherhood".

Educational institutions named after him across the country are primary schools in Yüreğir, Adana, Odunpazarı, Eskişehir, and Hendek, Sakarya, a highschool in Yenişehir, Diyarbakır and a police college also in Diyarbakır. Many streets bear his name, including in Büyükçekmece, Istanbul, Başakşehir, Istanbul, Esentepe, Istanbul, Gölbaşı, Ankara, Buca, İzmir, Ceyhan, Adana, Gürsu, Bursa, Tepebaşı, Eskişehir, Balıkesir, Gebze, Kocaeli, Derince, Kocaeli, Hendek, Sakarya, Turgutlu, Manisa, Atakum, Samsun, Fethiye, Muğla, Çiftlikköy, Yalova, Kars, Siirt and further a neighborhood in Salihli, Manisa. Public parks with his name are found in Küçükçekmece, Istanbul and Kartal, Istanbul. A police station in Odunpazarı, Eskişehir and a sports complex in Kars are named also in his honor.

== See also ==
- List of unsolved murders (2000–present)
