= 2000'e Doğru =

- Frequency: Weekly
- First issue: January 1987
- Final issue: 1992
- Country: Turkey
- Based in: Istanbul
- Language: Turkish
- OCLC: 27802367

2000'e Doğru (Turkish: Towards 2000) was a weekly Turkish news magazine. It was published between 1987 and 1992.

== History and profile ==
2000'e Doğru was established in January 1987 by Doğu Perinçek. The publisher was Sistem Yayıncılık. In 1989 it had a circulation of around 22,000 copies making it the second-highest circulation news weekly behind Nokta. Contributors included Halil Berktay, Aziz Nesin, Musa Anter, Turan Dursun and Soner Yalçın.

In 1987 editor Fatma Yazici was sentenced to one year and four months for "insulting" President Kenan Evren. Within the first two years the magazine had had 28 cases brought against it by the government, and editor Yazici had been sentenced to over eight years in prison. Several 1987 issues repeating statements made by Mustafa Kemal Atatürk about autonomy for Kurds were confiscated before publication.

The 2000'e Doğru edition of 16 February 1992 reported that eyewitnesses and sympathizers of Kurdish Hizbollah had informed them that members of the organization were trained in the headquarters of Turkey's rapid deployment force (Çevik Kuvvet) in Diyarbakır. Two days after the article was published, its author, Halit Güngen, was killed by unidentified murderers. The magazine folded in 1992.
