= Hasbullah =

Hasbullah (and similar variants including Hasbollah and Hasballah) is a Muslim masculine given name or surname derived from the Arabic expression ḥasbiya Llāhu (حسبي الله), meaning "God is sufficient to me". It may refer to:

== People ==
=== Mononym ===
- Hasbulla (born 2002), Russian social media personality

=== Given name ===
- Ahmad Hasbullah Mohd Nawawi (born 1960), Malaysian general, 27th Chief of Malaysian Army
- Hasballah M. Saad (1948–2011), Indonesian politician
- Hasbollah Daud (1902–?), Bruneian businessman and politician
- Hasbullah Abu Bakar (born 1994), Malaysian footballer
- Hasbullah Awang (1952–2015), Malaysian sports commentator
- Hasbullah Awang (footballer) (born 1983), Malaysian footballer
- Hasbullah Osman (1957–2020), Malaysian politician

=== Surname ===
- Abdul Wahab Hasbullah (1889–1971), one of the founders of the Indonesian Nahdlatul Ulama movement
- Ashkar Hasbollah, Malaysian politician
- Elfa Secioria Hasbullah (1959–2011), Indonesian composer and songwriter
- Shahul Hameed Hasbullah (1950–2018), Sri Lankan social activist, geographer and academic
- Tengku Hasbullah (born 1983), Malaysian footballer
- Wasyiat Hasbullah (born 1994), Indonesian footballer

== See also ==
- Hezbollah (disambiguation)
