= Hezbollah International Financing Prevention Act of 2014 =

US legislative bill

- Long title: To prevent Hezbollah and associated entities from gaining access to international financial and other institutions, and for other purposes.
- Announced in: the 113th United States Congress
- Sponsored by: Rep. Mark Meadows (R, NC-11)
- Number of co-sponsors: 3

Codification
- U.S.C. sections affected: 21 U.S.C. § 1901 et seq., 31 U.S.C. § 5321, 31 U.S.C. § 5322, 8 U.S.C. § 1189, 50 U.S.C. § 1705, and others.
- Agencies affected: United States Department of Justice, Executive Office of the President, United States Congress, United States Department of State, United States Department of the Treasury

Legislative history
- Introduced in the House as H.R. 4411 by Rep. Mark Meadows (R, NC-11) on April 7, 2014; Committee consideration by United States House Committee on Foreign Affairs, United States House Committee on Financial Services; Passed the House on July 22, 2014 (Roll Call Vote 434: 404-0)

The Hezbollah International Financing Prevention Act of 2014 (H.R. 4411) is a bill that would impose sanctions on foreign financial institutions that facilitate transactions or money laundering on behalf of Hezbollah or its agents. Hezbollah is designated a terrorist organization in the United States. Sanctions would also be applied to Hezbollah's television station, Al-Manar.

The bill was introduced into the United States House of Representatives during the 113th United States Congress.

== Background ==
Hezbollah (pronounced /ˌhɛzbəˈlɑː/; Arabic: حزب الله Ḥizbu 'llāh, literally "Party of Allah" or "Party of God") is a Shia Islamist militant group and political party based in Lebanon. Hezbollah's paramilitary wing is the Jihad Council; once seen as a resistance movement throughout much of the Arab world, this image upon which the group's legitimacy rested has been severely damaged due to the sectarian nature of the Syrian Civil War in which it has become involved since 2012. The group's paramilitary is considered more powerful than the Lebanese Army. Hezbollah, which started with only a small militia, has grown to an organization with seats in the Lebanese government, a radio and a satellite television-station, programs for social development and large-scale military deployment of fighters beyond Lebanon's borders. The organization has been called a state within a state. Hezbollah maintains strong support among Lebanon's Shia population. After the death of Abbas al-Musawi in 1992, the organisation has been headed by Hassan Nasrallah, its Secretary-General.

Hezbollah receives military training, weapons, and financial support from Iran, and political support from Syria. Following the end of the Israeli occupation of South Lebanon in 2000, its military strength grew significantly. Despite a June 2000 certification by the United Nations that Israel had withdrawn from all Lebanese territory. Hezbollah fought against Israel in the 2006 Hezbollah-Israel War. After the 2006–2008 Lebanese political protests and clashes, a national unity government was formed in 2008, giving Hezbollah and its opposition allies control of eleven of thirty cabinets seats; effectively veto power. In August 2008, Lebanon's new Cabinet unanimously approved a draft policy statement which secures Hezbollah's existence as an armed organization and guarantees its right to "liberate or recover occupied lands". Since 2012, Hezbollah has helped the Syrian government during the Syrian civil war in its fight against the Syrian opposition, which Hezbollah has described as a Zionist plot and a "Wahhabi-Zionist conspiracy" to destroy its alliance with Assad against Israel.

The United States, France, the Gulf Cooperation Council, United Kingdom, Australia, Canada, the Netherlands, the European Union and Israel classify Hezbollah as a terrorist organization, in whole or in part. The governments of Iran, Russia and China do not share this view of the organization.

The United States designated Hezbollah as a terrorist organization in 1995.

== Provisions of the bill ==
This summary is based largely on the summary provided by the Congressional Research Service, a public domain source.

The Hezbollah International Financing Prevention Act of 2014 would state that it shall be U.S. policy to: (1) prevent Hezbollah's global logistics and financial network from operating in order to curtail funding of its domestic and international activities; and (2) utilize diplomatic, legislative, and executive avenues to combat Hezbollah's criminal activities in order to block that organization's ability to fund its global terrorist activities.

The bill would direct the President to report to Congress: (1) a list of satellite, broadcast, or other providers that knowingly transmit the content of al-Manar TV; and (2) the identity of those providers that have or have not been sanctioned pursuant to Executive Order 13224.

The bill would direct the United States Secretary of the Treasury to prohibit or impose strict conditions on the opening or maintaining in the United States of a correspondent account or a payable-through account by a foreign financial institution that knowingly: (1) facilitates the activities of Hezbollah or its agents, instrumentalities, affiliates, or successors; (2) facilitates the activities of a person acting on behalf of or owned or controlled by an agent, instrumentality, affiliate, or successor; (3) engages in money laundering to carry out such an activity; (4) facilitates a significant transaction or provides significant financial services to carry out such an activity, including services that involve a transaction of gold, silver, platinum, or other precious metals; or (5) facilitates any of these activities, conspires to facilitate or participate in such an activity, or is owned or controlled by a foreign financial institution that knowingly engages in such an activity.

The bill would direct the Secretary of the Treasury to prescribe reporting, information sharing, and due diligence requirements for domestic financial institutions that maintain a correspondent account or payable-through account in the United States for a foreign financial institution. Authorizes the Secretary to waive such requirements if in the U.S. national security interests, and with congressional notification.

The bill would direct the Secretary of the Treasury to identify to Congress every 180 days each foreign central bank that carries out an activity prohibited under this Act.

The bill would set forth penalty requirements for specified violations under this Act.

The bill would direct the President to designate Hezbollah as: (1) a significant foreign narcotics trafficker if Hezbollah meets the criteria set forth under the Foreign Narcotics Kingpin Designation Act, and (2) a significant transnational criminal organization if Hezbollah meets the criteria set forth under specified executive orders and statutes. Requires the President to report to Congress which of these criteria the President determines that Hezbollah has not met, if it does not.

The bill would direct the United States Secretary of State to report to Congress regarding Hezbollah's involvement in the trade in rough diamonds outside of the Kimberley Process Certification Scheme.

The bill would declare that nothing in this Act shall apply to authorized U.S. intelligence activities.

The bill would state that any requirement of this Act shall cease to be in effect 30 days after the President certifies to Congress that Hezbollah: (1) is no longer designated as a foreign terrorist organization; (2) is no longer listed in the Annex to Executive Order 13224 (blocking property and prohibiting transactions with persons who commit or support terrorism); and (3) poses no significant threat to U.S. national security, interests, or allies.

== Congressional Budget Office report ==
This summary is based largely on the summary provided by the Congressional Budget Office, as ordered reported by the House Committee on Foreign Affairs on June 26, 2014. This is a public domain source.

H.R. 4411 would impose sanctions on foreign financial institutions that facilitate transactions or money laundering on behalf of Hezbollah—a terrorist organization—or its agents. It would require several reports and briefings on Hezbollah and the Administration's efforts to deter its activities. The Congressional Budget Office (CBO) estimates that implementing the bill would cost $3 million over the 2015-2019 period, assuming appropriation of the necessary amounts. Pay-as-you-go procedures apply to this legislation because it would affect direct spending and revenues; however, CBO estimates that those effects would not be significant.

== Procedural history ==
The Hezbollah International Financing Prevention Act of 2014 was introduced into the United States House of Representatives on April 7, 2014, by Rep. Mark Meadows (R, NC-11). It was referred to the United States House Committee on Foreign Affairs and the United States House Committee on Financial Services. On July 22, 2014, the House voted in Roll Call Vote 434 to pass the bill 404–0.

== Debate and discussion ==
Rep. Meadows, who sponsored the bill, said that "we must pass this legislation to make sure that we can do is cripple their ability to finance and put people out of harm's way."

Another supporter, Rep. Brad Schneider (D-IL), said that the legislation "would give the administration the means necessary to combat Hezbollah's global financial network."

Rep. Eliot Engel (D-NY) thought that sanctions would help persuade Hezbollah to negotiate.

== See also ==
- List of bills in the 113th United States Congress
