= Adham Barzani =

Kurdish politician

- ئەدھەم بارزانی
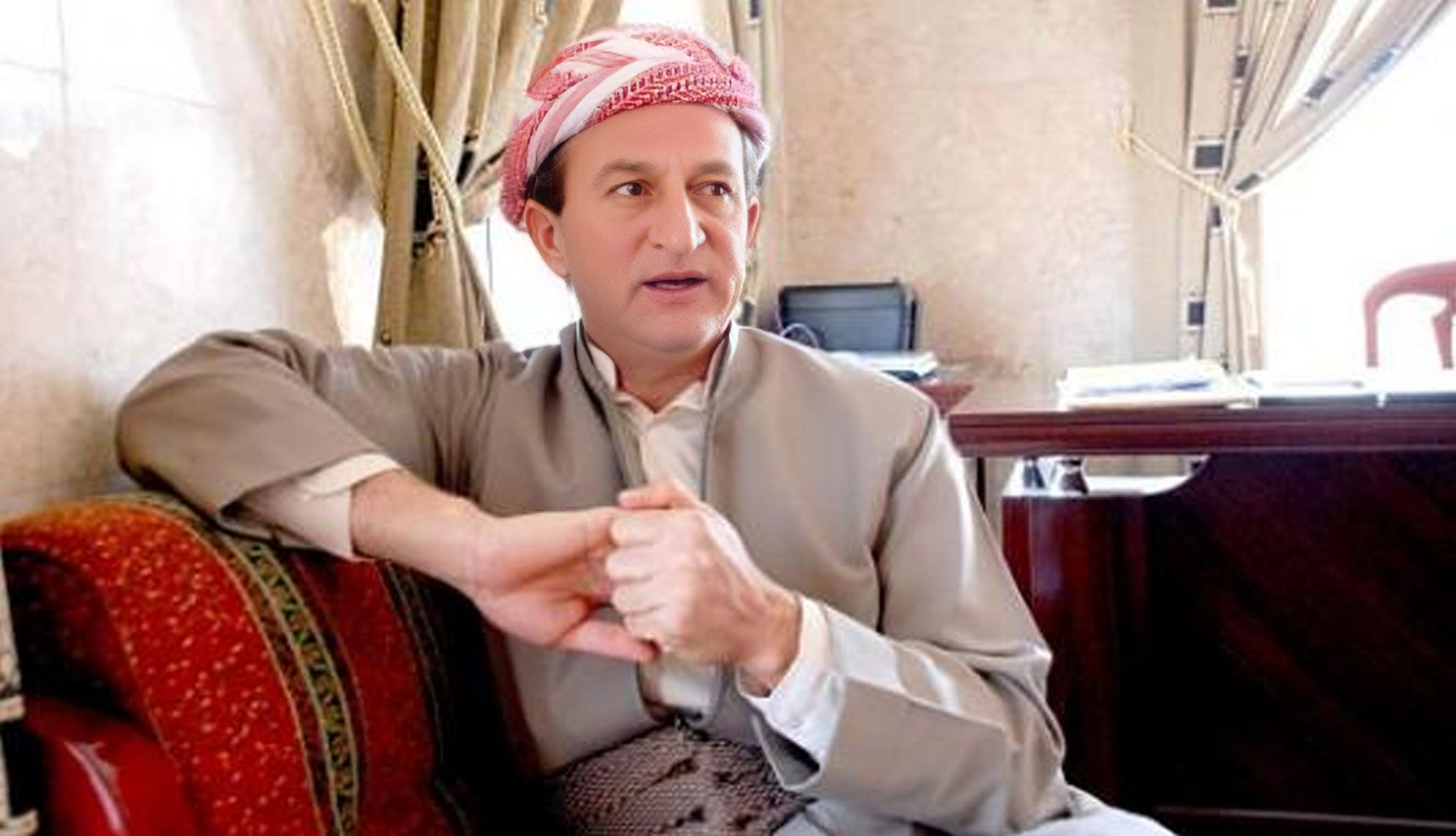
- Adham Barzani

Personal details
- Born: 16 April 1962 (age 63) Barzan, Iraqi Kurdistan
- Citizenship: Iraq
- Party: Independent
- Other political affiliations: Kurdish Revolutionary Hezbollah (1988-2004); Kurdistan Democratic Party (2004-2014)
- Relations: Barzani family
- Occupation: Former member of the Kurdistan Parliament, former leader of the Kurdistan Revolutionary Hezbollah

Adham Osman Ahmed Barzani (Kurdish: ئەدهەم عوسمان ئەحمەد بارزانی; born April 16, 1962) is a Kurdish politician and former member of the Kurdistan Democratic Party in the Kurdistan Region.

== Biography ==
He was born in Barzan on April 16, 1962, to Osman Barzani, the son of Ahmed Barzani. He began his political career establishing the Kurdistan Revolutionary Hezbollah in 1988. Like other Iraqi Kurdish parties, the group received funds from Iran against Saddam Hussein however the ideology of the group was Islamist in nature as opposed to the majority Kurdish groups which were secular. Kurdish Revolutionary Hezbollah was inactive after 2004, after which Adham Barzani joined the Kurdistan Democratic Party with the rest of his relatives. In 2011, tensions between him and the KDP began after he claimed that Masoud Barzani needed reform if he wanted to maintain his credibility. In 2014, he left the KDP and resigned from all his government posts. In March 2015, he expressed his desire to establish a new political movement after criticising Masoud Barzani and the KDP. He criticised the close ties between the KDP and Turkey, and he opposed Turkish military presence in Iraqi Kurdistan. He frequently called for the KDP to release detained activists and journalists in the Kurdistan Region. Referring to the Turkish intervention in Iraqi Kurdistan, he stated that "whenever Turkey has occupied a piece of territory, it has never withdrawn from it", and demanded Turkey to keep its conflict with the PKK inside Turkish borders. In May 2021, he sent a letter to the Hamas leadership, in which he expressed his support for them against Israel.

He had ties with Hüseyin Velioğlu, and in 1999 he hosted Velioğlu in the city of Soran, Iraq, in which 300 Kurdish Hezbollah fighters received training to use against Turkey. In June 2019, he was visited by İshak Sağlam of the Free Cause Party.

He was eventually banned from entering Erbil by the Kurdistan Regional Government. In July 2024, the Erbil Security Directorate of the KDP government issued an arrest warrant for Adham Barzani.
