= Kurdish Tribal Association =

Kurdish Tribal Association is a Kurdish tribal grouping (of about 20 to 30 tribes), established 1991 in Iraqi Kurdistan.
