= KSAF (association) =

KSAF is the Swedish acronym for Kurdish Student Academic Association.

The national associations and its local associations are politically and religiously independent. Their goal is to bring together Kurdish and Kurdistan-interested persons to various activities, such as cultural activities focusing on the Kurds and Kurdistan. In addition, members are committed to attract attention on the Kurdish issue.

Today, local associations are present in basically all university cities in Sweden; KSAF Linköping, KSAF Örebro, KSAF Stockholm, KSAF Uppsala and KSAF Väst, they organize movie nights, seminars and lectures and member-dinners with the many attendances with different national background. Thus, the association title has not to do with its member's national belongings but rather with the issues and activities they have. Furthermore, activities are not only directed to students and academics, but to all people regardless of their chores or occupation. Yet, an important goal is to encourage Kurdish youth to continue studying in college or university.

The national association was formed on September 12, 2009, however, the first local KSAF association was formed already in 2002 in Stockholm.

== See also ==
- Interview with information manager KSAF Stockholm
- List of Kurdish organisations
