= Turan Dursun =

Former Shia mufti and critic of Islam (1934–1990)

- Born: 1934; Şarkışla, Sivas Province, Turkey
- Died: 4 September 1990 (aged 55–56); Istanbul, Turkey
- Cause of death: Assassination by gunshot
- Citizenship: Turkey
- Occupations: Former mufti, author

Turan Dursun (1934 – 4 September 1990) was a Turkish author and atheist who was a critic of Islam. A former Muslim cleric and scholar of Shia Islam, he became an atheist during his study of the history of monotheistic religions. Influenced by the 9th-century Iranian skeptic philosopher Ibn al-Rawandi, Dursun wrote a number of books about religion which included interpretations of Islamic texts, heavily criticizing Islam and the founders of its major branches.

Dursun was frequently threatened by Islamic fundamentalists, and on 4 September 1990 was assassinated outside his home in Istanbul, after which his books sold tens of thousands of copies in Turkey.

== Biography ==
Dursun's father was an ethnic Turk and his mother was an ethnic Kurd. His parents were from the Ja'fari Twelver sect. From his childhood on, he was encouraged by his parents to be an Islamic scholar. With this purpose, he worked hard and mastered major Islamic texts.

=== Years as a mufti ===
After passing the necessary exams to become a mufti, Dursun was unable to officially become one as he did not have a primary school diploma. He had to complete primary school exams without attending school and did so with understandable speed. He achieved mufti status in 1958.

Whilst the mufti of Sivas, Dursun began establishing himself as a mufti of a different kind. Using his position, he initiated a number of projects for the development of the area and its imams:

- Organised 50 tree plantations in the different villages of Sivas.
- Forced plans for a mufti accommodation center to be changed for hospital to be built, with success.
- Collected wheat from villages as aid for the hospital project.
- Gave importance to the non-religious education of imams, through cinema and attendance of conferences.
- Facilitated issue of school diplomas for imams through the Ministry of Education.
- Put pressure on the mayor of Sivas for exhausting water supplies to be addressed.

Dursun gained a lot of followers and enemies at Sivas and was threatened on numerous occasions. He was exiled to the city of Sinop and stayed in what he called a "broken down shack". He received help from Ali Şarapçı, a teacher who was tormented and falsely labeled as communist, as Dursun was. His mufti career ended in 1966.

=== First atheistic thoughts ===
In an interview with Şule Perinçek, Dursun recounted one of the first instances when he began to doubt the existence of God. While he was eleven years old and in love with a girl named Safi, her older sister, Sabo, was disabled. Dursun pitied Sabo. One night, he saw God in a dream. After making God swear that he would not be angered, Dursun asked God why he created this Earth if he also created heaven, and why Sabo was disabled while Safi was beautiful. In the same interview, Dursun states that:

I was "always questioning and rebellious towards the concept of God", but the transition to atheism was an "evolving" one.

Dursun discovered what he called "Muhammad's passings on" when he began learning about the holy books that existed prior to the Quran. He states:

I did previously have knowledge of Judaism and Christianity, but through Islamic interpretations. I didn't know them from their own sources. I got to know their own sources in the 1960s.

Dursun began to research Christianity when it was planned that he would be proudly introduced to the Pope as an intellectual mufti. To prepare for this meeting and "be able to talk with [the Pope] with more strength", Dursun studied Christianity but "instantly" realized the "con" as he compared his already vast knowledge of Islam with Christian information.

After coming to negative conclusions about religion, Dursun became "angry" that Mohammed took away valuable years of childhood and youth. He said:

So many people can't live their childhoods properly because of him. So many people are sufferers of his disasters. So many people know what's right as wrong and what's wrong as right because they think the darkness that he chose exists. Human emotions and human creations haven't progressed in many ways, because of him.

Dursun was an independent theist for a short period of time before he became an atheist. First, he told himself that

If there is a God, he's not Mohammed's.

He undertook experiments to see if God existed or not during his mental battle with him. He began believing that humans evolved over millions of years and continued learning about anthropology. He stated that his independent theist period lasted "two or three years".

=== Life as a producer and an author ===
Following his resignation as a mufti, Dursun struggled to earn a living in Istanbul and even became a binman. The decision to quit as a mufti was tough, but Dursun stated that his principle was always "never to have a contradiction between what I thought and what I did".

Due to a number of friends he made as a thinking mufti, he was able to get a foot in at the Turkish Radio and Television Corporation, (TRT), working firstly in basic administrative positions before taking and passing an exam to become involved in programme production.

Among his productions are, "Turks in history", "Mankind from the beginning" and "Towards the evening" (unofficially translated titles). There is also a production which has never been allowed to be broadcast, titled "Before and after the first Grand National Assembly". Dursun resigned from TRT in 1982, after 16 years of service.

In 1987, Dursun was introduced to Doğu Perinçek, a self-proclaimed socialist politician with heavy nationalist undertones, who was the editor of the magazine 2000'e Doğru (Towards 2000). Dursun contributed to the magazine with a column titled "Din Bilgisi" (Knowledge of religion). He also wrote for other publications such as Saçak, Teori and Yüzyıl. He wrote countless books in the 1980s, including a Turkish translation of Ibn Khaldun's Muqaddimah, collating his vast knowledge of Islam and languages of the Middle East, opening the religion to internal criticism through the mass media, perhaps for the first time in the religion's history.

== Death ==
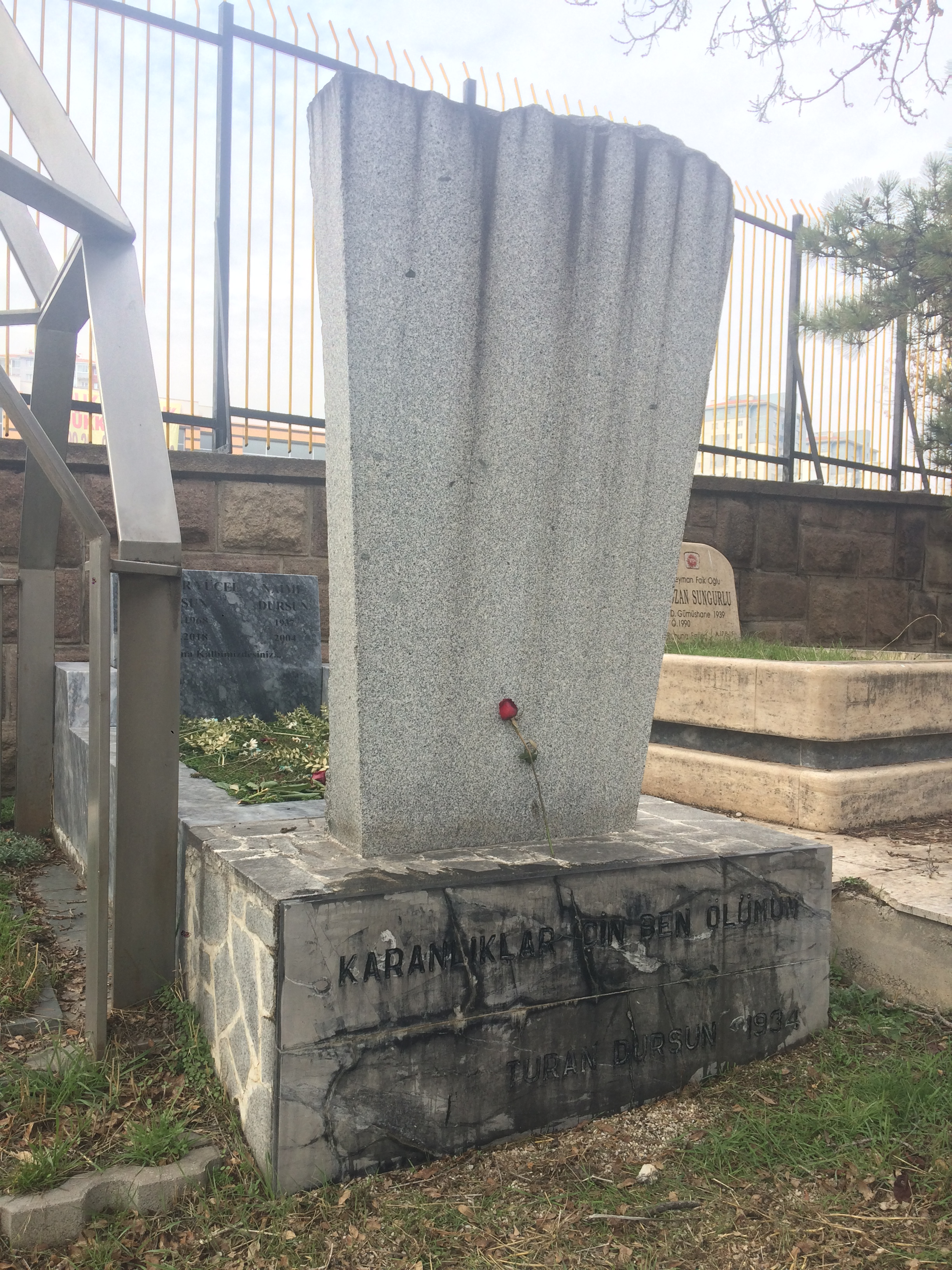
Grave of Turan Dursun at Cebeci Asri Cemetery.

On 4 September 1990, shortly after leaving his home in the Asian part of Istanbul on his way to work, Dursun was assassinated by two gunmen. He was hit by seven bullets.

=== Trial ===
As a result of the investigation, 15 suspects were arrested but they were immediately released after their first appearance in court. In 1996, İrfan Çağırıcı was arrested, suspected of being involved in the assassination of Dursun, as well as the killing of journalist Çetin Emeç in March 1990 and the kidnapping of Akbar Ghorbani (the People's Mujahedin of Iran's representative in Ankara). It was reported at Çağırıcı's trial that he had links with the Iranian government and was trained in Iranian camps. Çağırıcı (codenamed "Mesut") was a member of İslami Hareket Örgütü (English: "Islamic Movement Organisation" or "Islamic Action Group") and gave the order to murder Dursun for "humiliating the Quran". He was sentenced to death, and four co-defendants were imprisoned for life in July 2000; upon appeal, Çağırıcı's death penalty was also converted to life imprisonment in March 2002. However, the gunman who carried out the order, Muzaffer Dalmaz, is still at large abroad.

== Books ==
- Allah (Turkish: Allah)
- This is Religion 1: God and the Quran (Turkish: Din Bu 1: Tanrı ve Kur'an)
- This is Religion 2: Muhammad (Turkish: Din Bu 2: Hz. Muhammed)
- This is Religion 3: Society and Secularism in Islam (Turkish: Din Bu 3: İslamda Toplum ve Laiklik)
- This is Religion 4: Taboo Lingers (Turkish: Din Bu 4: Tabu Can Çekişiyor)
- Religion and Sexuality (Turkish: Din ve Cinsellik)
- Prayer (Turkish: Dua)
- Is the Universe a Joke? (Turkish: Evren Bir Şaka mı?)
- Qullatayn (Turkish: Kulleteyn)
- Quran (Turkish: Kur'an)
- Encyclopaedia of the Quran 1: Aba-Mind (Turkish: Kur'an Ansiklopedisi 1: Aba-Akıl)
- Encyclopaedia of the Quran 2: Accra-Arab (Turkish: Kur'an Ansiklopedisi 2: Akra-Arab)
- Encyclopaedia of the Quran 3: Arabu-Debt (Turkish: Kur'an Ansiklopedisi 3: Arabu-Borç)
- Encyclopaedia of the Quran 4: Vain-Prayer (Turkish: Kur'an Ansiklopedisi 4: Boşa-Dua)
- Encyclopaedia of the Quran 5: Pray-Hijra (Turkish: Kur'an Ansiklopedisi 5: Dua-Hicret)
- Encyclopaedia of the Quran 6: Hijra-Infidel (Turkish: Kur'an Ansiklopedisi 6: Hicret-Kafir)
- Encyclopaedia of the Quran 7: Kalb-Doubt (Turkish: Kur'an Ansiklopedisi 7: Kalb-Kuşku)
- Encyclopaedia of the Quran 8: Power-Miracle (Turkish: Kur'an Ansiklopedisi 8: Kuvvet-Mucize)
- Sources of Sacred Books 1 (Turkish: Kutsal Kitapların Kaynakları 1)
- Sources of Sacred Books 2 (Turkish: Kutsal Kitapların Kaynakları 2)
- Sources of Sacred Books 3 (Turkish: Kutsal Kitapların Kaynakları 3)
- Islam and Nurculuk (1971) (Turkish: Müslümanlık ve Nurculuk (1971))
- Such is Sharia (Turkish: Şeriat Böyle)
- Letters to Celebrities (Turkish: Ünlülere Mektuplar)

=== Translations ===
- Ibn Khaldun's Muqaddimah his work (2 volumes) (Turkish: İbn-i Haldun'un Mukaddime adlı eseri (2 cilt))

== See also ==
- List of assassinated people from Turkey
- List of former Muslims
