= Hezbollah Organization =

Former militant organization in Iran

- Leader: Abbas Aghazamani
- Ideology: Islamism; Political Islam
- Wars: Iranian Revolution

Hezbollah Organization (Persian: سازمان حزب‌الله, romanized: Sāzmān-e Ḥizbo'llāh) was a militant organization in Iran with an aim to overthrow the Pahlavi dynasty and replace it with an Islamic government.
