= Ittihadul Ulema =

Islamic organization in Turkey

Ittihadul Ulema, officially the Union of Islamic Scholars and Schools (Kurdish: Yekîtiya Aliman û Medreseyan; Turkish: Alimler ve Medreseler Birliği) is an Islamic organization active in Turkey, which holds dialogues, and operates various boarding schools and mosques.

== History ==
Ittihadul Ulema was established in Diyarbakır Gaziantep in 2013, by Noor Al Deen, and began giving education to both male and female students in a very short time. Ittihadul Ulema is headquartered in Diyarbakir and hosts Islamic conferences for both local and international attendants. Kurdish is an official language of Ittihadul Ulema, and it is a Kurdish-led organization. Ittihadul Ulema also uses Turkish and Arabic alongside Kurdish. Although Ittihadul Ulema claims that it has no affiliation with any governments or political groups, Enver Kılıçarslan is a veteran of the Kurdish Hezbollah, and had personally met Hüseyin Velioğlu in Iran in the 1980s. According to Turkish court documents, Enver Kılıçarslan was sentenced in February 2002 and had served seven years and six months in prison for his Hezbollah membership.

Ittihadul Ulema is a known rival of Diyanet, the Turkish government's religious ministry. Ittihadul Ulema claims that Diyanet is a Turkish nationalist establishment, and also accuses Diyanet of racism. However, Ittihadul Ulema supported Diyanet president Mehmet Görmez, and showed disappointment when Görmez was replaced by Ali Erbaş, and insisted that Görmez remained president. Mehmet Şenlik, deputy chairman of Ittihadul Ulema, stated that "Mehmet Görmez himself is a madrasa-based scholar, especially from madrasahs in Kurdistan. He is trained by Kurdish scholars. Mehmet Görmez's point of view on Islam is an Ummah viewpoint. He is not a racist, or nationalist ruler, like the previous Diyanet presidents." Ittihadul Ulema condemns nationalists, even Kurdish ones, although they use "Kurdistan" to refer to all Kurdish-majority areas, even inside Turkey. They claim that the term Kurdistan is not nationalist or seditionist, and that it is the rightful name of Kurdish-populated areas, and that the term is not a negative one, nor does it make Ittihadul Ulema a nationalist organization.

The official stance of Ittihadul Ulema on the situation of Kurds is that it can be solved only with Islam, and claims that Islam will unite the four parts of Kurdistan while also uniting the entire Muslim world, and resulting in a better situation for everyone. Ittihadul Ulema also considers scholars like Sheikh Said, Mahmud Barzanji, and Osman Abdulaziz to be role models for anyone who fights for Kurdish rights.

== Controversies ==
In 2022, during Ittihadul Ulema's "7th Meeting of Scholars" conference held in Diyarbakir, which was attended by Islamic scholars from various places including Turkey, Afghanistan, Lebanon, Libya, Jordan, Iraq, Iraqi Kurdistan, Iran, and Syria. At the conference, Iraqi Kurdistan was mentioned only as Kurdistan. Taliban spokesman,Zabihullah Mujahid, was the representative of Afghanistan, and when he was asked about Kurdistan during an interview at the meeting, he stated "we recognise Kurdistan. Kurdistan is not just a Kurdish issue, but an issue of all Islamic states." Zabihullah Mujahid announced his plans of visiting Iraqi Kurdistan in the future.

Yusuf Kaplan, a writer for Yeni Şafak, stated that Kurdistan's inclusion was problematic and its representatives should've been listed as representatives of Iraq, in which Dr. Imad Goyeni responded by saying "we are Kurds and we are currently in a place called Kurdistan. As Kurds, of course we speak with our mother tongue Kurdish, and we do not start problems with anyone about their mother tongue, just like the other nations. I was born Kurdish, no one can change this."

Enver Kılıçarslan rebuffed Kaplan's claims of Kurdistan's inclusion being problematic, and stated that no one at the meeting had a problem with Kurdistan's inclusion, nor was anyone provoked by it, not even the Iraqi or Syrian or other Turkish representatives. Kılıçarslan also argued that the only reason Kaplan had a problem with it was because he held racist beliefs secretly.

Ittihadul Ulema also sent a delegation to meet with Hamas leader Khaled Mashal in Qatar during the Gaza war.

In January 2024, Enver Kılıçarslan delivered an antisemitic speech at a pro-Hamas rally in Istanbul depicting Jews as monkeys and pigs. Senior Hamas official Suhail al-Hindi also spoke at the event.
