= Kurdish Hezbollah =

Far-right Kurdish nationalist and Islamist group in Turkey

- Hizbullahî Kurdî (Kurdish); Kürt Hizbullahı (Turkish)
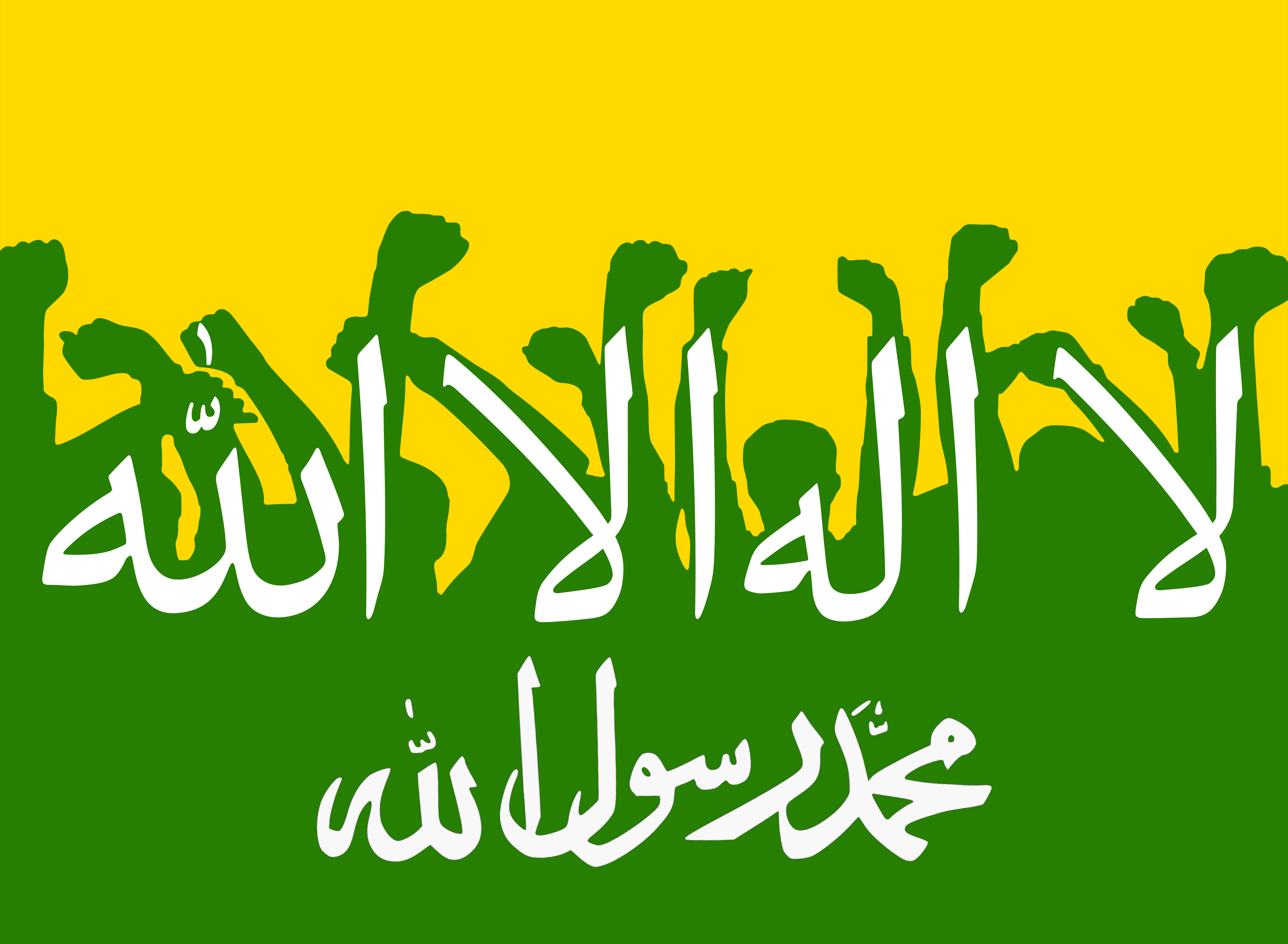
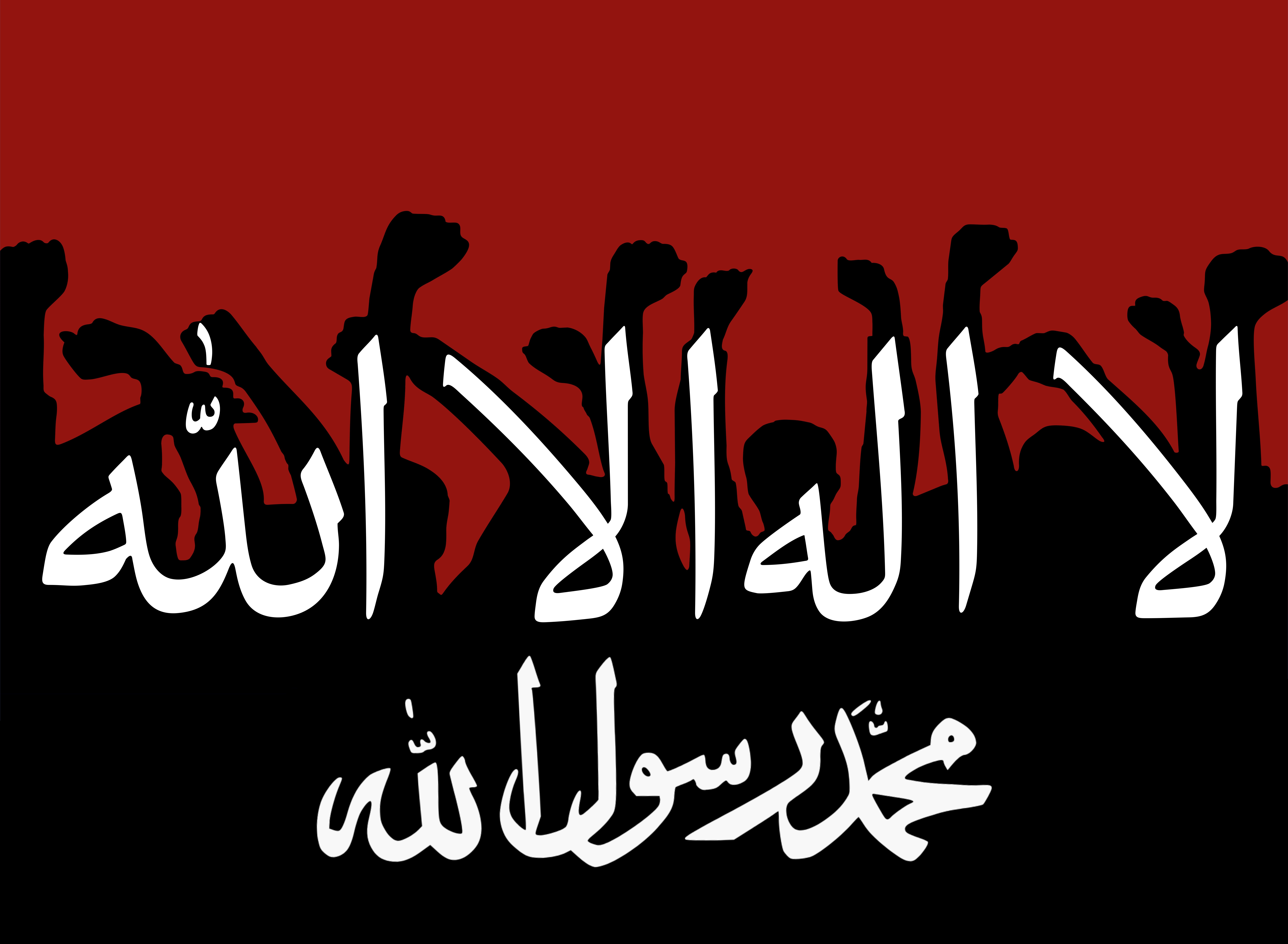
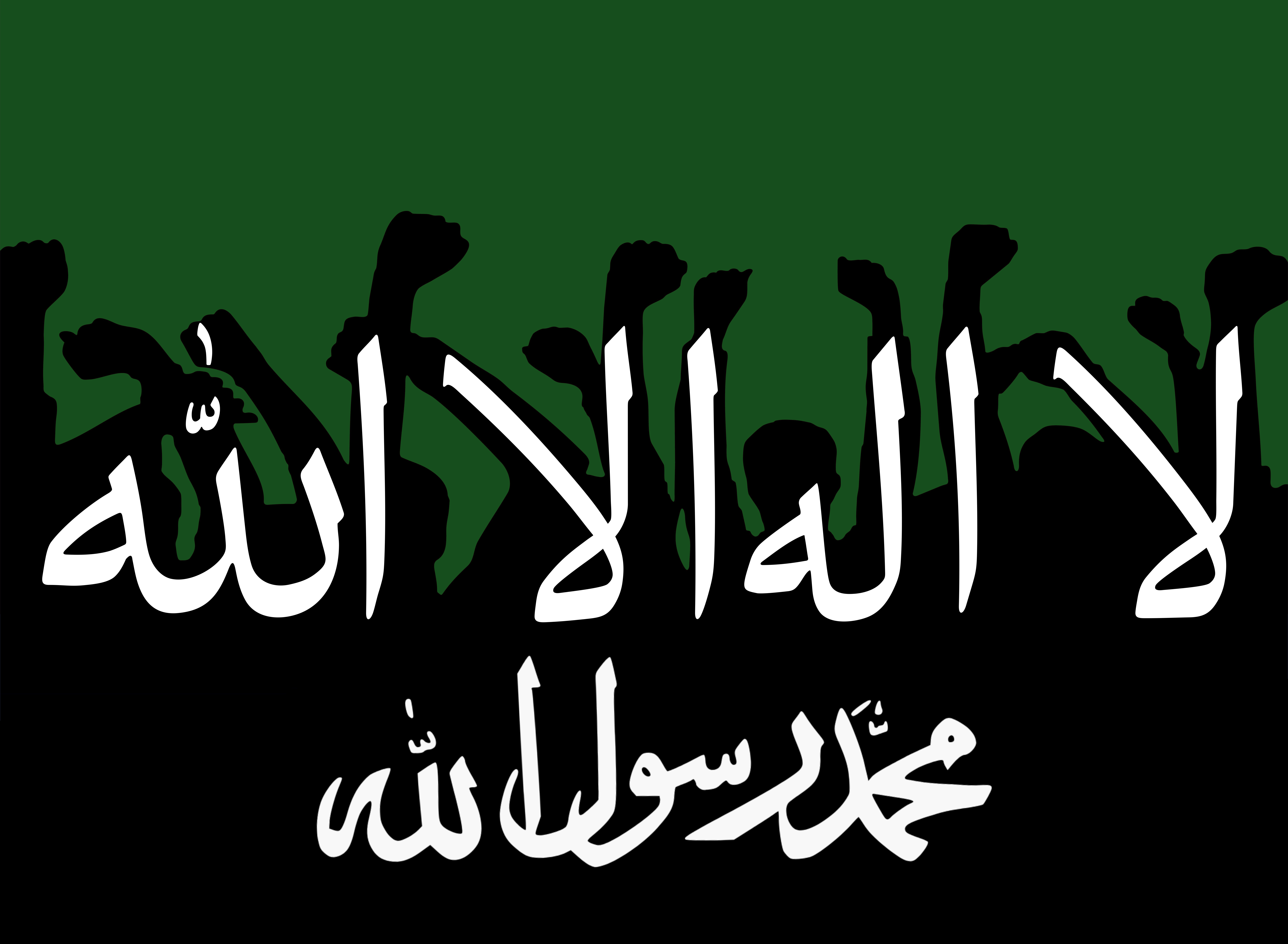
- Various color flags commonly used by the Kurdish Hezbollah
- Leaders: Hüseyin Velioğlu †; İsa Altsoy
- Dates active: 1983–2013
- Active regions: Turkey
- Ideology: Kurdish nationalism Kurdish-Islamic synthesis Social conservatism National conservatism Islamism; Anti-Zionism; Anti-communism; Shia–Sunni unity
- Political position: Far-right

Kurdish Hezbollah (Kurdish: حیزبوڵڵای کورد, romanized: Hizbullahî Kurdî, Turkish: Kürt Hizbullahı), also known as Hizbullah or Turkish Hezbollah, is a Kurdish Shia–Sunni Islamist militant organization, active against Turkey, and formerly against the Kurdistan Workers' Party (PKK) due to clashes that occurred between 1992 and 1995.

The organization, founded by Hüseyin Velioğlu, remains a primarily Kurdish group that has its roots in the predominantly Kurdish border of Southeastern Turkey and among Kurds who migrated to the cities in Western Turkey. The Kurdish Hezbollah began shifting increasingly towards Kurdish nationalism during Velioğlu's final years, and after Velioğlu's death, under İsa Altsoy's leadership, they disarmed and began focusing on charity work for the Kurdish population living in Turkey under various organizations. The Hezbollah reestablished in 2003 in Southeastern Turkey and "today its ideology might be more widespread than ever among Kurds there". Kurdish Hezbollah's influence was not limited to Turkey and it has also "left an imprint on Turkish Kurds in Germany." The Kurdish Hezbollah is closely affiliated with the Free Cause Party (HÜDA PAR).

== Background ==
In the 1970s, various Kurdish Islamists sought to work through democratic means to develop Islamism in Turkey. It initially remained a Kurdish group that had its roots in Southeastern Turkey, and Kurdish Islamists who migrated to the prosperous cities in Western Turkey. The group utilized poor economical situations of the Kurdish population and had built its social bases in their areas. Many joined the Turkish National Student Union (Milli Türk Talebe Birliği, MTTB), the youth organization of the National Salvation Party. With the closure of these after the 1980 Turkish coup d'état, it appeared clear that the military was too strongly dedicated to secularism for the democratic route to be an option, and a group of Islamists launched the Union Movement (Vahdet Hareketi). The movement organised around two bookshops in Diyarbakır: Fidan Gündör's Menzil and Hüseyin Velioğlu's İlim. Until 1987, the groups gathered around these bookshops worked together. According to the Guido Steinberg, the Turkish government cooperated with the group against the Kurdistan Workers' Party (PKK).

In 1987, when Hüseyin Velioğlu moved his bookshop to Batman, different opinions on leadership and armed actions resulted in the split of the two wings. The so-called İlim-wing, under the leadership of Hüseyin Velioğlu, insisted to start the armed struggle immediately. The dispute resulted in bloody fighting between the two factions. Between 1990 and 1993, the İlim group killed many members of the Menzil group, and ultimately emerged victorious. In 1993, the İlim group took the name Hizbullah.

== History ==
The İlim group became known as Hizbullah in 1993, after emerging victorious from a bloody factional war between two wings of the Union Movement (Vahdet Hareketi) which had been established following the 1980 Turkish coup d'état's crushing of Islamist hopes for democratic success. Hüseyin Velioğlu's group had previously been known as İlim, named for his bookshop. In March of the same year, soon after Abdullah Öcalan was expelled from Ba'athist Syria, there were reports of an Iranian-brokered peace accord between KH and PKK.

According to Turkish security officials, the Kurdish Hezbollah was financed by and trained in post-revolutionary Iran, with the Iranian government allegedly using Islamic terrorist groups in order to establish Islamic governments throughout the Middle East.

Further groups within the Kurdish Hezbollah were named as Tevhid, led by Nurettin Şirin and Mehmet Şahin, and Yeryüzü, led by Burhan Kavuncu. Besides the town of Batman, Hezbollah was strongest in Cizre district of Şırnak, Nusaybin district of Mardin, and Silvan district of Diyarbakır province. For a long time, the village Yolaç was used as their base.

Initially, the Kurdish Hezbollah and the Kurdistan Workers' Party (PKK) had been allies, with some of the earliest Hezbollah fighters receiving their training in PKK camps. In the early 1990s, the organization became a direct threat to the already rising Kurdish separatist movement. The Hezbollah viewed the "PKK's claim to be the only true spokesman of Kurdish nationalism" as a "threat to its own identity", and dubbed the PKK as the Partiya Kafirin Kurdistan, meaning "Kurdistan Infidels' Party". As an Islamist organization, the Kurdish Hezbollah began as an oppositional force against the PKK, but have targeted both PKK militants and other people they considered "immoral" (people who drank alcohol, wore mini-skirts, etc.). Between 1992 and 1995 the Kurdish Hezbollah killed around 500 PKK members, for the loss of around 200 of its own.

In 2007, after the assassination of Hrant Dink, his friend Orhan Alkaya suggested that the three-shot assassination technique was a signature mark of the Kurdish Hezbollah. Some of the major terrorist attacks carried out by the Kurdish Hezbollah allegedly include an April 1999 suicide bombing in Bingöl, and the 2001 assassination of Diyarbakir police chief Gaffar Okkan and five other police officers. The group also targeted journalists who wrote about its activities, particularly those who wrote about the collaboration between them and the Turkish government. It was believed that the group gets support from the Turkish Armed Forces for its conflict against the PKK. Journalists, mainly Kurds, associated with 2000'e Doğru and Özgür Gündem were particularly targeted (see List of journalists killed in Turkey).

== Turkish military support ==
The Kurdish Hezbollah claimed that they do not work with Turkey and that it is mere PKK propaganda, while Turkey also hated Hezbollah throughout their entire existence but only tolerated them at first, due to them fighting the PKK. A former JİTEM agent confirmed that the Turkish government had offered assistance to the Kurdish Hezbollah against the PKK, although Hüseyin Velioğlu kept refusing it, stating that the Kurdish Hezbollah really hates Turkey and aims for peace with the PKK. The PKK also exaggerated links between Turkey and the Kurdish Hezbollah, to discredit Kurdish Hezbollah and to distract the public from the fact that the PKK itself was infiltrated by Turkish agents before.

The weekly 2000'e Doğru of 16 February 1992 reported that eyewitnesses and sympathizers of Kurdish Hezbollah had informed them that members of the organization were educated in the headquarters of Çevik Kuvvet, the rapid deployment force of the General Directorate of Security (Turkish National Police), in Diyarbakır. The article's author, Halit Güngen, was killed by unidentified murderers two days after the article was published. Namik Taranci, the Diyarbakir representative of the weekly journal Gerçek ("Reality"), was shot dead on November 20, 1992 on his way to work in Diyarbakır. Again, the previous edition of the magazine had examined relations between the Turkish state and Kurdish Hezbullah. Hafiz Akdemir, reporter for Özgür Gündem ("Free Agenda"), was shot dead in a street of Diyarbakır on June 8, 1992, after reporting that a man who had given refuge to assassins fleeing a Hezbollah-style double killing in Silvan was released after only six weeks in custody, without even appearing in court. The 1993 report of Turkey's parliamentary investigative commission referred to informations that the Kurdish Hezbollah had a camp in the Batman region where they received political and military training and assistance from the Turkish security forces.

Former Minister Fikri Sağlar said in an interview with the paper Siyah-Beyaz ("Black-White") that the army not only used the Kurdish Hezbollah, but actually founded and sponsored the organization. He maintained that such a decision had been taken in 1985 at the highest levels: the National Security Council. On 17 January 2011 Arif Doğan, a retired colonel in the Turkish army who also claims to be a founder of JİTEM, while testifying in court in the Ergenekon case, declared that he set up Hezbollah as a contra group to force to fight and kill militants of the PKK. The organization was originally to be called Hizbul-Kontr ("Party of the Contras"). According to journalist Faik Bulut, some members of the Kurdish Hezbollah were caught in Istanbul with 40 kg of C-4 explosive and valid Turkish National Intelligence Organization identity cards in January 2000.

== Human resources ==
In December 2003 Corry Görgü put the number of militants as high as 20,000 a figure presented by the Center for Defense Information as well. Information provided by the Intelligence Resource Program of the Federation of American Scientists based on the 2002 Patterns of Global Terrorism report suggests that the organisation possibly has a few hundred members and several thousand supporters. Ufuk Hiçyılmaz stated that the group had about 1,000 armed members.

== Trials (2000–2011) ==
After the kidnapping of several businessmen in Istanbul and the subsequent raid of a house in Beykoz quarter a nationwide hunt on Hezbollah supporters followed. During the operation in Beykoz on 17 January 2000 Hüseyin Velioğlu was killed and Edip Gümüş and Cemal Tutar were detained. Edip Gümüş, born 1958 in Batman was alleged to lead the military wing of Hezbollah and Cemal Tutar was said to be a member of the armed wing. In this period nearly 6000 KH members were arrested.

In the time to follow many trials were conducted in Diyarbakır and other places against alleged members of Hezbollah. In several instances defendants raised torture allegations. Such allegations are documented in Urgent Actions (UA) of Amnesty International. In the trial in which Edip Gümüş and Cemal Tutar were indicted the defendant Fahrettin Özdemir said on 10 July 2000 that he had been held in custody for 59 days and had been tortured. In the hearing of 11 September 2000 Cemal Tutar said that he had been held in police custody for 180 days.

The Turkish Hezbollah trial was concluded in December 2009. The defendants received varying terms of imprisonment.

Eighteen members of Turkish Hezbollah, amongst them Edip Gümüs and Cemal Tutar, were released from jail on 4 January 2011, in accordance with a recent amendment to the Turkish criminal code that set a limit of 10 years on the time detainees can be held without being sentenced in a final verdict. The juridic authorities demanded a re-arrest of the released, but the police failed in locating them.

== Movement of the Oppressed and Free Cause Party (2002–present) ==
Following the decision to end armed struggle in 2002, sympathizers of Hizbollah's Menzil group founded an association called "Solidarity with the Oppressed" (tr: Mustazaflar ile Dayanışma Derneği or short Mustazaf Der) in 2003. It also became known as the Movement of the Oppressed (Turkish: Mustazaflar Hareketi). On 18 April 2010 Mustazaf Der organized a mass meeting in Diyarbakir to celebrate the anniversary of Muhammad's birthday. The Turkish police estimated that the event was attended by 120,000 people. The organizers put the figure at over 300,000.

On 20 April 2010 a court in Diyarbakir ordered the closure of the Association for the Oppressed (Mustazaf-Der) on the grounds that it was "conducting activities on behalf of the terrorist organization Hizbollah." The decision was confirmed by the Court of Cassation on 11 May 2012.

In late 2012, the Movement of the Oppressed announced its will to found a political party, basically to challenge the hegemony of the Peace and Democracy Party. In December 2012, a political party with the name Free Cause Party (Hür Dava Partisi) was founded. Hüda-Par, the abbreviated form of the party's name is synonymous with Hizbollah, both interpreted as the "God's Party", emphasising that the party is a front for the otherwise illegal Hizbollah. Societies affiliated with Hüda-Par operate under the umbrella organisation Lovers of Prophet (Turkish: Peygamber Sevdalıları, Kurdish: Evindarên Pêyxamber) particularly active in Kurdish Mawlid meetings.

== Flags ==
Some of the flags used by Hezbollah Kurdistan.

== See also ==
- Ittihadul Ulema (Union of Islamic Scholars and Schools)
- Kurdish separatism in Iran (1918–present)
  - Iran–PJAK conflict (2004–present)
- Kurdish–Iraqi conflict (1918–present)
- Kurdish–Syrian conflict (2012–present)
- Kurdish–Turkish conflict (1921–present)
  - Human rights of Kurdish people in Turkey
  - Kurdistan Workers' Party insurgency (1978–2025)
  - Timeline of Kurdish uprisings
- List of illegal political parties in Turkey
- People killed by Kurdish Hezbollah
  - Konca Kuris, Turkish feminist, one of Hezbollah's victims
- Shia Islamism

=== Kurdish Islamism ===
- Great Eastern Islamic Raiders' Front (İBDA-C)
  - Salih Mirzabeyoğlu
  - State of Grandsublime
- Islamic Emirate of Kurdistan (1994–2003)
- Kurdish Hezbollah of Iran
- Kurdistan Islamic Movement (Turkey)
- Kurdistan Revolutionary Hezbollah

=== Kurdish unionism ===
- Kurdistan independence movement
  - Abdullah Öcalan
    - Imprisonment in Turkey (1999–present)
  - Democratic confederalism
  - Kurdistan Communities Union (KCK)
  - Kurdistan Free Life Party (PJAK)
  - Kurdistan Workers' Party (PKK)

== Bibliography ==
- Kurt, Mehmet (2017), Kurdish Hizbullah in Turkey: Islamism, Violence and the State (PDF), London: Pluto Press
- Steinberg, Guido W. (2013), German Jihad: On the Internationalisation of Islamist Terrorism, New York: Columbia University Press, doi:10.7312/stei15992, ISBN 978-0-231-50053-1
