= Great Eastern Islamic Raiders' Front =

Islamic fundamentalist organization

- İslami Büyük Doğu Akıncılar Cephesi
- State of Grandsublime flag also used by the group
- Leader: Salih Mirzabeyoğlu #
- Dates active: 1984–present
- Allegiance: Al Qaeda
- Active regions: Turkey
- Ideology: Sunni Islamism; Islamic fundamentalism Pan-Islamism; Jihadism; Great East; Desecularization; Anti-Zionism; Anti-communism
- Wars: Terrorism in Turkey

The Great Eastern Islamic Raiders' Front (İslami Büyükdoğu Akıncılar Cephesi in Turkish, abbreviated İBDA-C) is an Islamist militant organization. The group's self-proclaimed goal is to dismantle Turkey and form the State of Grandsublime (Turkish: Başyücelik Devleti), a Sunni Islamic federate state in the Middle East. They are notably hostile to Shia, Alevi, Christian and Jewish interests. İBDA-C carries on its pro-Islamic legacy with a newly born radicalism that wishes to restore religious rule to Turkey of whose government it finds illegal with an added willingness to commit acts of terrorism.

İBDA-C has a history of claiming credit for attacks most experts believe are beyond its capabilities, such as the November 2003 and July 2008 attacks on diplomatic, business, and religious interests in Istanbul. As such, its designation with the United States government continues to be as an "Other Terrorist Group", as opposed to the better-organized and -financed groups designated as official "Designated Foreign Terrorist Organizations".

== History ==
İBDA-C was founded in 1970 by Salih İzzet Erdiş, better known as Salih Mirzabeyoğlu. The group moved from rhetoric to violence in the 1990s, culminating in a series of 90 bombings and attacks in 1994.

Despite its neo-Ottomanist orientation, İBDA-C was initially considered a Kurdish group, as its founding generation were almost entirely Kurds. However, the group was different from the Kurdish Hezbollah, which had a separatist orientation. Later on, İBDA-C began to recruit more Turks, who increasingly became more prominent in the group.

According to Hasan Yalçın, leader of the socialist Workers and Peasants Party of Turkey, new IBDA-C members received training in Greece from PKK veterans.

Salih İzzet Erdiş, a spiritual follower of Kısakürek, was captured on Dec. 31, 1998, and sentenced to death in April 2001 for "attempting to overthrow Turkey's secular state by force". His lawyer, Ahmet Arslan, maintained that his client was no more than "a man of thought", arguing that there was a lack of concrete evidence supporting the charges. Erdiş's death sentence was later commuted when Ankara abolished the death penalty in August 2002.

In August 2003, Erdiş claimed responsibility for his crimes and attributed his actions to "mind control", seeking help from the Forensic Medicine Institute in Turkey. In March 2004, a Turkish court sentenced Erdiş to 20-years in prison for using handmade explosives and weapons in a riot against authorities at Metris Prison.

Following the imprisonment of Erdiş, İBDA-C continued its activities, being most heavily active in the Istanbul region, attacking bars, discothèques, and churches. Members of İBDA-C don't operate under any defined hierarchical structure, and carry out actions in small independent groups that are united behind their common goals and ideologies.

== Doctrine ==
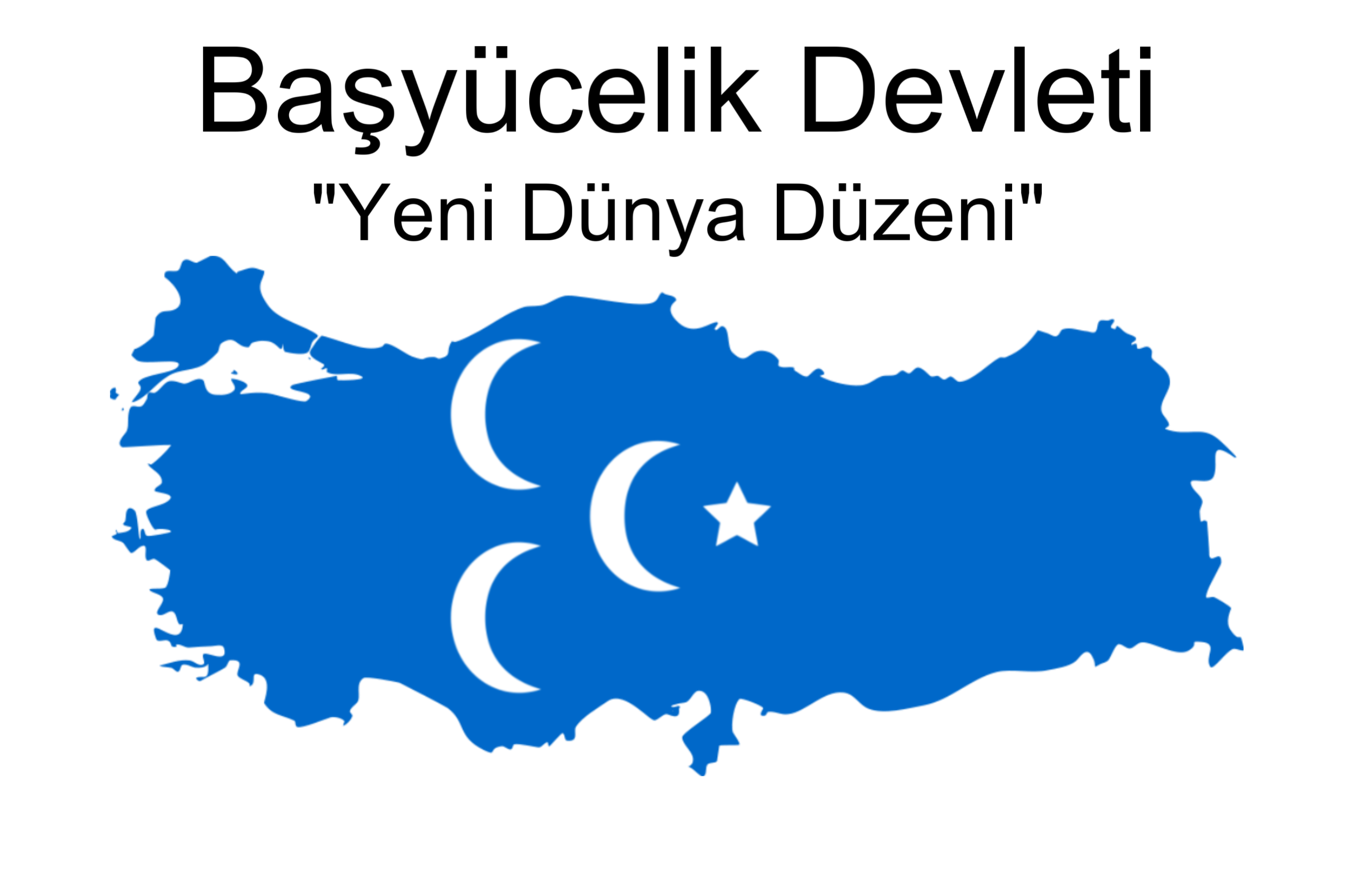
The State of Grandsublime is the goal of İBDA-C

The Great East Islamic Raiders Front comprises Turkish Sunni Jihadis, a contingent roughly defined as those who are willing to take up arms for the faith of Islam. Viewing Turkey's secular governmental system as "illegal," IBDA-C wishes to destroy the secular state and constitutional system and replace it with religious rule and law, first in Turkey, and then throughout the world. The group has gone about asserting these goals by inflicting armed terror primarily on civilian targets. IBDA-C shares ideological ties with Al-Qaeda.

Necip Fazıl Kısakürek, whom IBDA-C borrows its core ideology from, advocated a return to "pure Islamic values" and the restoration of a universal Islamic caliphate in the Muslim world. His system of thought, Büyük Doğu, was an absolutist ideology promising to bring Muslims closer to success and salvation, with the central idea that truth is only accessible through the practice of Islam. He also argued that the secular nature of Turkey was responsible for the state's inability to ward off what he saw as Western imperialism. Kısakürek was seen as the pioneer of "ideal Islamic society" by the founders of IBDA-C.

The 2003 Istanbul bombings provide the strongest implication of ties between IBDA-C and Al-Qaeda, although the exact nature of their cooperation remains unclear. Al-Qaeda may have acted merely as an outside support base, or possibly in tandem with IBDA-C in terms of planning and execution. Some, on the other hand, assert that IBDA-C had no involvement at all; contradicting reports from the Turkish media solely credit al-Qaeda with the attacks, implying that IBDA-C did not have the means to carry out such a sophisticated act of terrorism. Indeed, IBDA-C showed no willingness to exercise suicide terrorism prior to November 2003. Regardless of whether or not IBDA-C actively participated in these particular attacks, the attention received provided the group with a heightened level of international infamy, as they were previously not well known at the global level.

Despite Al-Qaeda's similar aims and superior stature as an international terrorist organization, IBDA-C views itself as the quintessential Islamic revivalist movement toward which all others should dedicate their resources. In addition to committing terrorist attacks, the organization also produces propagandist literature put out in bookstores and on the Internet, which has the potential to attract new members, including those from other countries.

In December 2003, the German newspaper Der Spiegel reported that the group could count on as many as 600 supporters in Germany. In another report regarding the possible German contingent, a Turkish rail worker claimed, "Istanbul was nothing. The major butchery is yet to come." Although IBDA-C is thought to have supporters throughout Western Europe, the group has not performed any significant terrorist attacks there since their alleged actions in Istanbul. The number of extremist supporters actively participating in IBDA-C's terrorist plots is not known, but thought to be small.

IBDA-C has kept relatively quiet in 2004, although seven members of the group were indicted in June for the murder of a Turkish cult leader, Col. tr:İhsan Güven and his wife. Burak Çileli, one of the defendants, is said to have described Güven contemptuously in IBDA-C literature, calling him a "pervert," a "Jewish sympathizer," and "pro-American." The accused were apparently angered that the murders were not immediately reported by the press, claiming that they also had plans to attack a TV talk show host and columnist named Savas Ay in order to heighten publicity for their organization.

IBDA-C is not an organization to be taken lightly, but it can perhaps be said to have a dubious future as its leader, Erdiş, sits in prison, and the group has no clearly defined hierarchical structure. By the same token, the lack of organized centrality makes the group more elusive and difficult to eliminate, much like al-Qaeda. IBDA-C will continue to be a threat if it is able to sustain external spheres of support, especially from other terrorist organizations such as al-Qaeda.

After Erdiş's arrest and subsequent conviction on December 29, 1998, followed by the detention of many lower-ranking figures in the group, IBDA-C's activity seemed to quiet down. However, IBDA-C burst back into the headlines when it claimed responsibility for the dual synagogue bombing in Istanbul on November 15, 2003, which killed 24 and injured 255, as well as a subsequent attack on the HSBC Bank and British consulate on November 20, 2003 (see 2003 Istanbul bombings). The second claim called the bombings a joint attack with Al Qaeda; the authenticity of the claim is disputed.

On November 29, 2003, police in Istanbul announced the arrest of a yet-unnamed man they stated had admitted to giving the order to suicide bombers to attack Beth Israel synagogue on November 15.

== Designation as a terrorist organisation ==
The organisation is listed among the 12 active terrorist organisations in Turkey as of 2007 according to Counter-Terrorism and Operations Department of Directorate General for Security (Turkish police). In December 2001, IBDA-C was labeled an "illegal organization" by the Turkish Republic of Northern Cyprus.

It is also one of the 48 groups and entities to which European Union's Common Position 2001/931/CFSP on the application of specific measures to combat terrorism has applied. In April 2003, the U.S. Department of State (DoS) designated the group as a "terrorist group" in their annual Patterns of Global Terrorism report.

== Human resources ==
According to information provided by the Intelligence Resource Program of the Federation of American Scientists based on the 2003 Patterns of Global Terrorism report the strength of the organisation in terms of human resources remains unknown.

A study carried out by the Counter-Terrorism and Operations Department of Directorate General for Security over a sample of files about people convicted of being a terrorist under Turkish laws including 200 militants from the organisation and the four other currently active Islamic organisations (see reference 1) 2.5% of the members are aged 10 to 14, 72.5% 15 to 24, 17% 25 to 29, 6% 30 to 34, and 2% 35 to 64. University graduates make up 22.5% of the members, high-school graduates 40%, secondary-school graduates 14%, primary-school graduates 19%, literate non-graduates 2.5% and illiterates 1.5%.

== See also ==
- Kurdish Hezbollah
- Caliphate State
- Raiders Organization
- Islamic terrorism
- List of terrorist groups
- List of illegal political parties in Turkey
