= Hüseyin Velioğlu =

Turkish Islamist militant leader

- Born: Hüseyin Durmaz; January 1, 1952; Batman, Turkey
- Died: January 17, 2000 (aged 48); Beykoz, Istanbul, Turkey
- Cause of death: Shootout
- Education: Faculty of Political Science, Ankara University
- Occupations: Islamic bookstore owner, later militant leader
- Organization: Kurdish Hezbollah
- Movement: Kurdish nationalism

Hüseyin Velioğlu (born Hüseyin Durmaz; January 1, 1952 – January 17, 2000) was the founder and leader of the Kurdish Hezbollah, a Kurdish separatist and Islamist group which was designated as a terrorist group by the Turkish government. He was killed by Turkish police during the raids in Istanbul in 2000.

== Life ==
Velioğlu was born in Bağözü, Gercüş on January 1, 1952, to a Sunni Kurdish family from the Habezbenî tribe. He was the youngest of the 5 children of Osman and Fatime Durmaz. He legally changed his surname to Velioğlu ("son of Veli") in 1978. His family was known among Kurds as "Mala Welî" ("House of Welî"). Welî was his paternal grandfather. He viewed it as a more authentic surname, unlike Durmaz which was imposed by the Turkish government.

He adopted nationalist views during his early adulthood, and began studying Kurdish history full-time. He was described as an expert on Kurdish geography, dialects, and tribes. In addition to his native Kurmanji, he significantly understood many other dialects.

Velioğlu and Abdullah Öcalan studied together at the Faculty of Political Sciences of the University of Ankara. In 1978, while still a university student, he got married, and he had 7 sons and 4 daughters. While Velioğlu was in university, he joined the Turkish National Student Union (MTTB) in 1978. The MTTB was a Turkish nationalist organization from its foundation in 1946 to 1960, Turkish–Islamic synthesist during the 1960s, and entirely Islamist from 1970 until its closure after the 1980 coup.

Velioğlu claimed that Kurdish separatism was justified, unlike Turkish or Arab nationalism. He considered himself the leader of the Kurdish movement in Turkey, while encouraging the Kurdish movement in the other countries. He claimed that Kurds need to be nationalist and separatist, and stated that the enemies of Kurds will never abandon their nationalism, and will continue wronging Kurds. Velioğlu told Kurds that Turkey was not their country and that Turks were not their allies. He also claimed that a shared belief in Islam did not mean that Kurds were obliged to accept the borders. He displayed some Pan-Islamist tendencies by claiming that the first thing Kurdistan should seek after independence is good relations with Muslim states, and prioritize them above those of non-Muslim states.

When he first founded the Kurdish Hezbollah, he had good relations with the PKK. Some of the earliest Kurdish Hezbollah militants received their initial training in PKK camps. However, differences between the Kurdish Hezbollah and the PKK later arose. During his leadership of the Kurdish Hezbollah, Velioğlu made many attempts to form a united front with the PKK against Turkey, although he had failed, mostly due to the reluctance of the PKK to work with a heavily Islamist group. He initially avoided conflicts with the PKK, although the conflict eventually began when Hezbollah began retaliating. Velioğlu claimed that throughout the conflict, he had always offered to stop fighting the PKK if it would stop targeting Hezbollah. He ordered Hezbollah to only fight the PKK in self-defense, and to not retaliate after PKK attacks. He claimed that the conflict only benefitted Turkey and that it should have been avoided. According to a retired JITEM agent, Turkey had offered support to Hezbollah against the PKK, which Velioğlu had refused. The clashes between Hezbollah and the PKK ended in 1995, although there was no official ceasefire until 1998.

Velioğlu was the most wanted man in Turkey after the 1999 arrest of Abdullah Öcalan. The conflict between Velioğlu and Öcalan was mainly a power struggle over the Kurdish movement in Turkey. After 1995, Velioğlu and Öcalan gradually reconciled.

Velioğlu founded the Kurdish Hezbollah in 1987, moving forward with the goal of forming Kurdistan as an independent country. Velioğlu spoke Kurdish better than Turkish. He also often replied in Kurdish to his associates who spoke Turkish to him. Velioğlu was very extreme in achieving his goals, and went as far as completely banning the use of Turkish among female affiliates of Hezbollah, claiming that it would raise a generation which further retained Kurdish.

Velioğlu was infamous and seen as very competent for evading authorities throughout his career, even managing to travel to other countries with considerably large groups of Hezbollah militants for training.

Velioğlu frequently travelled to Iran. Velioğlu claimed that he cut ties with Iran in 1996 because of Ali Khamenei insisting that Velioğlu convert to Shia Islam. He claimed that Iran was never sincere. Velioğlu avoided sectarianism between Sunnis and Shias, and claimed that Shias were equally as Muslim as Sunnis.

In 1998, Velioğlu travelled to Iraqi Kurdistan with Hezbollah militants who received military training from the Kurdistan Islamic Movement, led by Osman Abdulaziz. Velioğlu later travelled to the city of Soran along with 300 Kurdish Hezbollah fighters who received training from the Kurdistan Revolutionary Hezbollah, led by Adham Barzani.

On January 17, 2000, was at a safehouse in Beykoz with many Hezbollah leaders. Shortly after the Afternoon prayer, they heard the Turkish police attempting to break down the door. A Hezbollah member informed Velioğlu, who told him to "grab the kalashnikovs". Velioğlu approached the door, and a militant stood behind him, while the rest went to fire at the police from the windows. When the police broke the door, they were instantly met with heavy fire, and Velioğlu and the militant were both killed after a brief shootout. After seeing that it was Velioğlu, the police briefly left and later raided the house for the remaining two Hezbollah members. Edip Gümüş, a close friend of Velioğlu, claimed that Velioğlu, in the days before his death, would often say "God willing, I will not survive the hands of the enemy." Turkish undertakers refused to prepare his body, and he was left in the morgue for 20 days before being buried. His supporters clashed with Turkish police during his burial. Velioğlu was buried in Batman. Supporters of Velioğlu referred to him as "Şehîd Rehber" (Kurdish for "the martyred leader").

In 2016, there were tensions between the Kurdish Hezbollah and Cübbeli Ahmet, who allegedly insulted Hüseyin Velioğlu.
