= State of Grandsublime =

Proposed Islamic state in Turkey

Proposed flag of the State of Grandsublime

The State of Grandsublime (Turkish: Başyücelik Devleti) refers to a concept for an Islamic state that would replace the Republic of Turkey. The concept was created by Salih Mirzabeyoğlu, leader of İBDA-C.

== History ==
The concept was put forward by Necip Fazıl Kısakürek, although Salih Mirzabeyoğlu was the one who designed it. The model of the State of Grandsublime is an Islamic state based on Sharia. As opposed to the nationalist policies of the Republic of Turkey, the State of Grandsublime would not be a nation-state nor an ethnocracy, its leader could be anything as long as he is religiously qualified, no ethnicity would have superiority over another, and names such as "Turkistan", "Kurdistan", or "Lazistan" could be used in areas with a Turkish, Kurdish, or Laz majority, which would also quell separatism as no ethnicity would have a reason to separate. Advocates of the State of Grandsublime view the Republic of Turkey as a legacy of Mustafa Kemal Atatürk, and aim for its complete dissolution. The State of Grandsublime also did not recognise Misak-ı Millî nor plan to expand like the Neo-Ottomanism. Qisas would be used State of Grandsublime. The Great Eastern Islamic Raiders' Front carried out armed activities in order to fulfil the creation of the State of Grandsublime.

There would be a "Grand Congress" instead of parliament. The congress consists of a council of "the ones who think and act the best in the nation." Each member of the council "lives in wujud and love." The council is formed by a constituent assembly for the first time, and the members of the congress have no limit in their terms. The council consists of 101 people between the ages of 40 and 65. A person from within is elected by the council as the "Sublime Leader" (Başyüce). The Sublime Leader is the head of state. Although there would be no limits on the term the head of state can serve, elections would be held every five years to ensure that the head of state is still competent and eligible for leadership. The head of state can be overthrown without elections if seventy-five percent of the members of the congress agree. The head of state cannot directly overthrow the congress, but he can choose forty percent of the members of the congress to keep, and make an election, in which if a decision is made in favor of the leader, new members of congress could be elected by the forty percent. The government would work "on behalf of the greatest representative to the smallest", starting with the head of state, who will be the head of the army as well. The direct deputy of the Başyüce would be the Başbuğ, the second most powerful in the country. One of the most important institutions in the State of Grandsublime would be the "Supreme Religion Department". The head of the Supreme Religious Department is at the same level as the head of the government and is also elected by the Başyüce. The Supreme Religious Department undertakes duties such as internal suggestion, external propaganda, religious education, training and staffing of religious servants and can be considered as the main consultation center of the state under the command of the Supreme Council and next to the Supreme Congress. There is also a "People's Court", which gathers on certain days of the year, and anyone can go to the podium and say their opinions. The People's Court has no power to sanction or participate in the administration.

== See also ==
- Caliphate State
