= Imprisonment of Abdullah Öcalan =

Imprisonment of the leader of the Kurdistan Workers Party in Turkey

Abdullah Öcalan has been imprisoned on İmralı Island in the Sea of Marmara since February 1999. He is serving a life sentence for violating Article 125 of the Turkish Penal Code. Initially, he was sentenced to death, but the conviction was commuted to a life sentence in October 2002.

== Background ==
Abdullah Öcalan is a founder of the Kurdistan Workers' Party (PKK), a terrorist group that initially aimed for an independent Kurdistan but later adapted its demands to focus on cultural and political rights for the Kurds. He led the PKK and its struggle from bases in Lebanon and Syria until he was expelled from Syria in October 1998. Following his expulsion, he toured several countries in Europe and Africa, all of which refused to either detain and try him or grant him asylum.

=== Capture and trial ===
Abdullah Öcalan was eventually captured in Nairobi, Kenya, by an operative of the Turkish Secret Service in February 1999 and brought to the prison facility on Imrali island. His trial began on 31 May 1999 and concluded on 29 June with a death sentence for treason and separatism. The death sentence was commuted to life imprisonment in October 2002. The abolition of the death penalty paved the way for Turkey to begin accession negotiations with the European Union.

Despite being imprisoned for more than 25 years, Öcalan is still respected and seen as the leader of the PKK by several political actors within Turkey and representatives of the Kurdish diaspora. His calls to lay down arms, turn themselves in, and hold peace negotiations have often been followed by members of the PKK. In the past, peace negotiations were also facilitated by the Turkish authorities.

== Detention conditions ==
Since his capture in February 1999, Öcalan has spent several years in solitary confinement on İmralı Island. In November 2009, five other prisoners were brought to the island, where a new detention facility had been built. The new prison was constructed after the Council of Europe's Committee for the Prevention of Torture (CPT) visited the island and objected to the conditions in which he was being held. Turkish authorities announced that Öcalan would be allowed to engage with the other prisoners for ten hours a week. In 2014, the European Court of Human Rights (ECHR) ruled that there had been a violation of Article 3 regarding his status as the only prisoner on İmralı Island until 17 November 2009.

=== Detention facility ===
In 2010, the CPT visited İmralı prison and noted that Öcalan had received reasonable improvements in his treatment. He is housed in a cell of about 10m^{2} with access to a sanitary compound of about 2m^{2}. The cell has enough space for a table, chairs, a bed, and a sink. Additionally, he has access to an outdoor facility of 24m^{2}. The cell lacks a direct natural light source, due to the 7-meter-high wall surrounding both the cell and the outdoor facility. In addition to his right to listen to the radio and read newspapers, which he had been granted previously, Öcalan was provided with a television in January 2013.

=== Interactions between inmates ===
Having been the only inmate until November 2009, Öcalan can now choose to participate in physical activities such as table tennis, volleyball, and basketball, each of which he can play for one hour per week. Additionally, he is allowed to play chess for one hour per week. On İmralı, inmates can meet once a week for a so-called "conversation hour."

=== Visitation rights ===
From 27 July 2011 until 2 May 2019, Abdullah Öcalan's lawyers were not allowed to meet with him. From July 2011 until December 2017, his lawyers filed more than 700 appeals for visits, all of which were rejected. Öcalan was banned from receiving visits for nearly two years, from 6 October 2014 until 11 September 2016, when his brother Mehmet Öcalan visited him for Eid al-Adha. On 6 September 2018, visits from lawyers were banned for six months due to previous punishments Öcalan received between 2005 and 2009, the fact that his lawyers made their conversations with him public, and the belief that Öcalan was leading the PKK through communications with his lawyers. He was again banned from receiving visits until 12 January 2019, when his brother was allowed to visit him a second time. His brother reported that his health was good. The ban on lawyer visits was lifted in April 2019, and Öcalan saw his lawyers on 2 May 2019.

== Political influences ==
In 2008, the Justice Minister of Turkey, Mehmet Ali Şahin, said that between 2006 and 2007, 949 people were convicted and more than 7,000 people prosecuted for calling Öcalan "esteemed" (Sayın). In 2011, almost a hundred Kurdish mayors were charged with terror propaganda for demanding better detention conditions for Öcalan. Politicians from the pro-Kurdish Peoples Democratic Party (HDP) raised the issue of his solitary confinement several times in the Turkish parliament and demanded that Öcalan be allowed to communicate with his relatives and lawyers. During the peace process between the PKK and Turkey, Öcalan received visits from politicians of the Peace and Democracy Party (BDP), between January and March 2013. In support of the peace process, the PKK released six Turkish soldiers and two state employees in March 2013, on Öcalan's orders.

== Popular campaigns caused by the imprisonment ==
After Öcalan's capture, rallies were organized outside embassies in several countries. When security guards opened fire on intruders at the Israeli consulate in Berlin, two people were killed. Of the seventy-four individuals who self-immolated in protest of his capture, sixteen died. Regular demonstrations have been held by the Kurdish community to raise awareness of Öcalan's isolation. Since at least 2015, rallies demanding the liberation of Abdullah Öcalan have been held each February in Strasbourg, the seat of the European Court of Human Rights (ECHR).

=== Hunger strikes ===
Over 140 Kurdish associations organized hunger strikes in protest of Öcalan's capture. In later years, hunger strikes were held demanding an end to Öcalan's solitary confinement. In September 2012, some prisoners began a hunger strike, which over time involved thousands of prisoners, as well as politicians from pro-Kurdish parties. In November 2012, about 10,000 Kurdish prisoners joined the hunger strike, calling for better detention conditions for Öcalan, the right to use the Kurdish language in trials, and the start of peace negotiations between Turkey and the Kurdistan Workers' Party (PKK). The strike lasted for sixty-eight days until Öcalan demanded its end. Several politicians from the HDP participated in hunger strikes demanding improved detention conditions. Former HDP MPs Leyla Güven, Sebahat Tuncel, and Selma Irmak also participated in hunger strikes. Leyla Güven ended her hunger strike in May 2019 only after Öcalan was able to receive a visit from his lawyers and called for an end to the hunger strikes.
