= Konca Kuriş =

Turkish feminist writer (1961-1998/99)

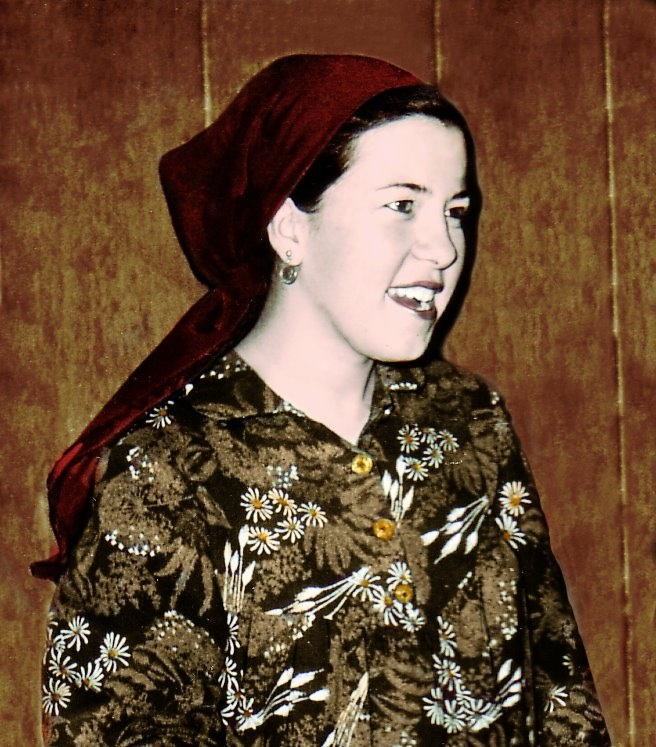
- Born: 16 October 1961
- Disappeared: July 1998; Mersin, Turkey
- Body discovered: 22 January 2000; Konya, Turkey
- Resting place: Mersin Interfaith Cemetery
- Occupations: Writer; activist
- Spouse: Orhan Kuriş
- Children: 5

Konca Kuriş (16 October 1961 – 1998/99) was a Turkish feminist writer who was murdered by Kurdish Hezbollah in Konya, Turkey, after being kidnapped in 1998.

== Death ==
Contrary to popular belief, Kuriş was never member of the Kurdish Hezbollah. Kuriş was kidnapped from front of her house by three armed gunmen in July 1998. She was tortured for 38 days and then killed and buried in a shallow grave. Torture sessions were recorded by the killers. Her body was found in January 2000 in Konya after the operation in which Hüseyin Velioğlu, the Kurdish Hezbollah leader was killed. She was 38. Her death was a turning point in that it drove the Turkish security forces to target the Hezbollah organization.

== Perpetrators ==
Kurdish Hezbollah claimed responsibility for her abduction, torture, and death with a statement "An enemy of Islam and a secular-feminist Konca Kuriş due to her actions and statements against Allah and Quran Al Karim, has been kidnapped by Hizbullah warriors and questioned in our bases. Konca Kuriş, who has been acting in parallel with the official religion statements and under the directives of the irreligious-secular Turkish Republic and also who has been used by the Zionists as well, has been punished according to the requirements of the sharia law for initiating activities that would put Muslims into doubt." It was found that Hezbollah killed many people. Kuriş was the only female victim of Hezbollah.

== Personal life ==
She was married to Orhan Kuriş and had five children.

== Legacy ==
A plaque with the text, "Konca Kuris 1960-1998 Tortured and murdered for advocating women's rights in Islam", had been placed at the Canberra Nara Peace Park, part of the Lennox Gardens in Canberra, Australia.
