= Salih Mirzabeyoğlu =

Turkish Islamist writer (1950–2018)

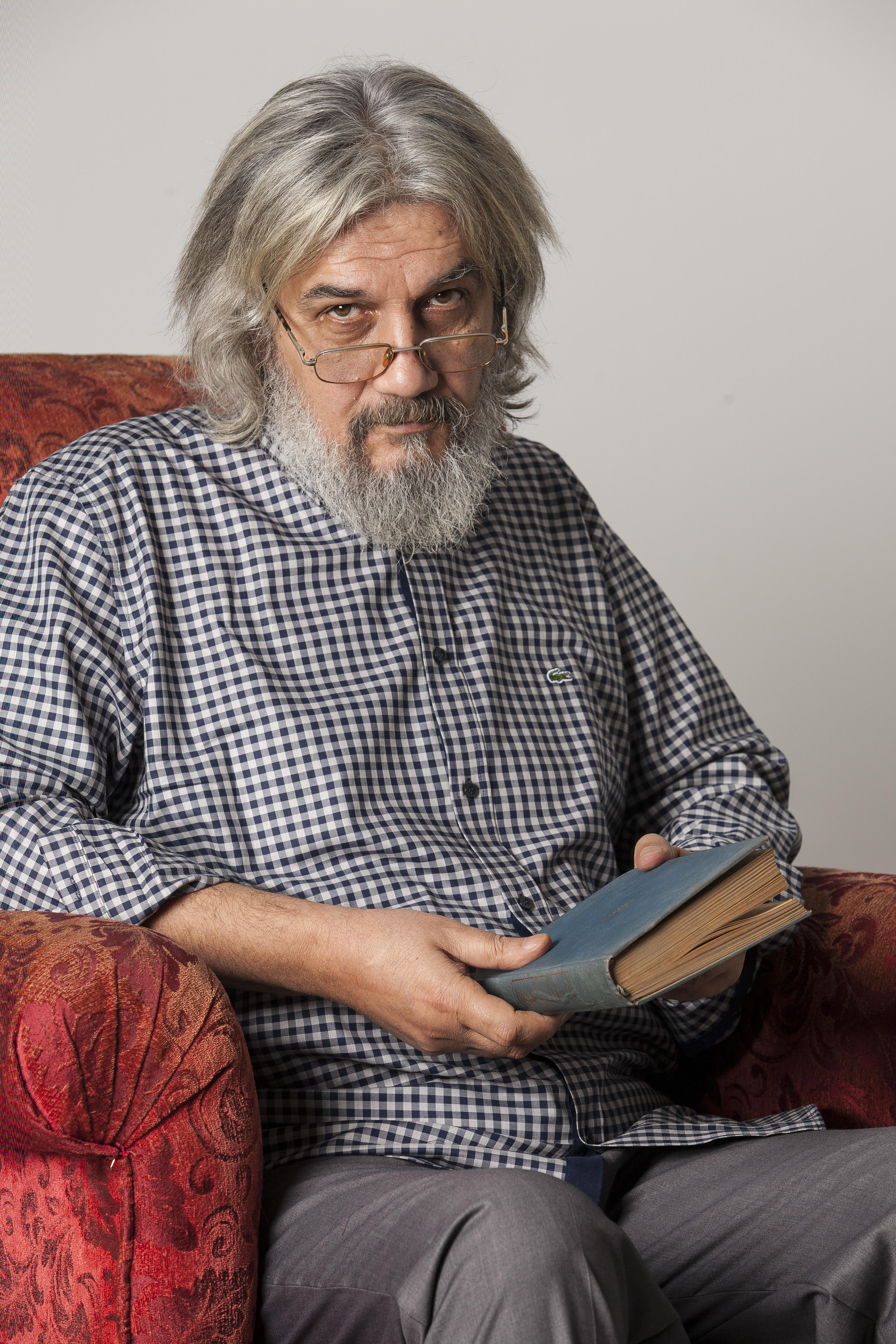
- Salih Mirzabeyoğlu
- Born: Salih İzzet Erdiş; May 10, 1950; Erzincan Province, Turkey
- Died: May 16, 2018 (aged 68); Yalova Province, Turkey
- Occupation: Author
- Known for: Great Eastern Islamic Raiders' Front (İBDA-C)

Salih Mirzabeyoğlu (real name Salih İzzet Erdiş; 10 May 1950, in Erzincan – 16 May 2018, in Yalova) was a Turkish Islamist militant leader and religious fundamentalist. Mirzabeyoğlu, an ethnic Kurd originally from Bitlis, was born to a prominent Islamist family which was close to both the Naqshbandi and Nurcu brotherhoods, and were involved with the Kurdish Sheikh Said rebellion in 1925 against the newly founded Turkish Republic. Most of his supporters were Kurds.

In 1975, he and his friends published a political magazine called Gölge (Shadow). Mirzabeyoğlu was influenced by the Islamist poet Necip Fazıl Kısakürek who published a magazine called Büyük Doğu.

He is the ideologue and alleged leader of the Great Eastern Islamic Raiders' Front (İBDA-C), a militant Islamist group present in Turkey. He was arrested on 29 December 1998 for allegedly trying to overthrow the constitutional order by force. Subsequently, following the İBDA-C concept of 'leaderless resistance', further attacks on banks, synagogues, churches, places serving alcohol and TV stations were claimed by groups who said they were part of İBDA-C. The bombings in Istanbul claimed 65 lives including that of the British consul general Roger Short. Mirzabeyoğlu was sentenced to life imprisonment.

On 23 July 2014, he was released from prison, and on 29 November 2014 consulted with President Recep Tayyip Erdoğan.

== Bibliography ==
He has written 50 books.

- Bütün Fikrin Gerekliliği (Necessity of Whole Idea)
- Tarihten Bir Yaprak (A Paper from History)
- Necip Fazıl'la Baş Başa (with Necip Fazıl)
- Kültür Davamız (Our Culture Thesis)
- Şiir ve Sanat Hikemiyatı (Poetry and Art Philosophy)
- İstikbal İslâmındır (The Future Belongs to Islam)
- Anafor (Whirlpool - poems)
- Adımlar (Steps - interviews)
- Büyük Muztaribler 1-2-3 (Great Agitateds - philosophy history)
- Tilki Günlüğü 1-2-3-4-5-6 (Fox Diary - spiritual novel)
- Sefine (Ship - philosophy of physics)
- Elif (Aleph - painting)
- Yağmurcu (Rainer)
- Hırka-ı Tecrid
- Marifetname
- Yaşamayı Deneme (Trying to Live - novel)
- Hakikat-i Ferdiye
- Furkan (different kind of dictionary)
- Telegram
- Müjdelerin Müjdesi (stories)
- Münşeat (a different kind of poems)
- İBDA Diyalektiği (Dialect of İBDA)
- İslam'a Muhatap Anlayış (Understanding Towards to Islam)
- Kavgam 1-2 (My Struggle)
- Sahabinin Rolü ve Manası (Role and Meaning of Disciple)
- Hukuk Edebiyatı (Literature of the Laws)
- Başyücelik Devleti (State of Başyücelik)
- Aydınlık Savaşçıları (Fighters of Light - epic)
- Dil ve Anlayış (Language and Understanding)
- Kökler (Roots)
- Kayan Yıldız Sırrı (Mystery of Slipping Star - poem)
- İktisat ve Ahlâk (Economics and Morality)
- Parakuta (about politics/aesthetics of money)
- Önsöz (Preface)
- İdeolocya ve İhtilâl (Ideology and Revolution)
- Hikemiyat (Philosophies)
- İşkence (Torture - anecdote)
- Gölgeler (Shadows - novel)
- Damlaya Damlaya
- Üç Işık (Three Lights)
- Erkam (Philosophy of mathematics)
- Berzah

== See also ==
- Abdulhakim Arvasi
