= Gülnaz Karataş =

Kurdish fighter Karataş (1971–1992)

- Born: 1971; Solhan, Bingöl, Turkey
- Died: 25 October 1992 (aged 20–21); Iraqi Kurdistan
- Other names: Gulnaz Karatas, Bêrîtan
- Education: Istanbul University
- Organization: Kurdistan Workers' Party
- Known for: Fighter, Kurdish cultural figure

Gülnaz Karataş (1971–25 October 1992), nom de guerre, Bêrîtan, was a female fighter of the Kurdistan Workers' Party (PKK). She became a Kurdish cultural figure after dying, and a symbol of women within the guerrilla movement.

== Early life and education ==
Gülnaz Karataş was born in 1971 in Solhan, Bingöl, Turkey. Her family was Alevi Kurdish from Dersim. She attended primary and secondary school in Elazığ.

In 1989, she began to study at the Department of Economics at the Istanbul University. It is reported that until 1990 she was unaware of her Kurdish heritage.

== Adult life ==
In 1990 she got to know networks of the PKK and was arrested, but released shortly after in 1991. On the 9 May 1991 she entered the PKK in the Cudi Mountains, Şırnak. In 1992, she was sent as a leader of a small group to Şemdinli. In the 1990s she was often featured in PKK publications, including Serxwebûn and Berxwedan magazines.

On October 25, 1992, she fought against the pro-Barzani Peshmerga in Iraqi Kurdistan who have allied themselves with the Turkish army during Iraqi Kurdish Civil War. The legend says, she fought until the last bullet. The commander of the adversary peshmerga called on her to surrender, but she threw herself off a cliff in order to avoid arrest.

== Legacy ==
She became an iconic figure within the history of the PKK and many songs and newborns are named after her. Abdullah Öcalan, the founder of the PKK, had often included her in his analysis. Halil Uysal produced a film, Bêrîtan (2006) about her life. In 1993, her death served as an inspiration to Zeynap Kinaci for her suicide attack against the Turkish military.

Her remains were found in 2005 and transported to an area controlled by the PKK, where she was buried.
