= Mazlum Doğan =

Member of the Kurdistan Workers' Party (1955–1982)

- Born: 1958; Karakoçan, Turkey
- Died: 21 March 1982 (aged 23–24); Diyarbakır Prison, Turkey
- Cause of death: Suicide
- Occupation: Journalist
- Organization(s): Dev-Genç, Kurdistan Workers’ Party
- Known for: Founding member of the Kurdistan Workers’ Party, first editor of Serxwebûn
- Notable work: Serxwebûn
- Political party: Kurdistan Workers’ Party
- Movement: Kurdish political movement
- Parents: Kazim Doğan (father); Kebire Doğan (mother)

Mazlum Doğan (1955 – 21 March 1982) was a journalist and a founding member of the Kurdistan Workers' Party (PKK). He was a Kurdish Alevi which was often told to attract new recruits to PKK. He was the first editor-in-chief of the PKK's propaganda newspaper Serxwebûn. In 1979, he had planned to leave Turkey towards Syria but was arrested and served time in the infamous Diyarbakir No. 5 prison. Mazlum Doğan committed suicide in protest of the Turkish coup d'état and the inhumane conditions he and other prisoners were facing inside of the penitentiary. Today he is presented as a hero and a martyr by the PKK and related organisations.

== Early life ==
Mazlum was raised by his mother, Kebire, and his father, Kazim Doğan, in the small town of Karakoçan, Elazığ Province of Turkey. He had three older sisters, Arife, Asiye (Serap) and Nezaket and two brothers Fevzi and Delil. Delil was killed by special operation teams on 7 October 1980.

== Education ==
Doğan began his high school studies in Eskişehir & Karakoçan and Dersim & Balıkesir. After successfully passing the entrance exams, he enrolled at the prestigious University of Hacettepe in Ankara, Department of Economics, in 1974. While studying at university, he met other young Kurds who familiarized him with politics. He developed a passion for reading. Those who knew him well have said that he would read up to five-hundred pages or more a day. Through his readings, he became informed on oppression against Kurds. Determined to fight discrimination even if it meant with his own life, Doğan left the university in 1976 and went back to the Kurdish region to organize politically. There he joined the Kurdish student movement, which was the precursor of the Kurdistan Workers' Party.

== Founding of the Kurdistan Workers' Party ==
The Kurdistan Workers' Parties (PKK) origins can be traced back to 1974 when Abdullah Öcalan and a small group of leftist students, including Doğan, from the underground student movement Revolutionary Youth Federation of Turkey (Dev Genç) decided to develop a Kurdish-based left wing organization. In 1971 Öcalan joined the underground movements trying to overthrow the government, which he saw as an oppressive and fascist; this occurred when he was a student at the Ankara University Political Sciences Faculty. There, Öcalan met Mazlum Doğan who was studying economics. Öcalan and Doğan used the skills and the social network that they had developed during this period to become youth leaders. Like "Dev-Genç", Apocus was a splinter organization of Dev-Genç. The core of the organization was established with sixteen members and led by Öcalan. The original sixteen members became known as the Ankara Democratic Association of Higher Education (ADYÖD). During this period, Öcalan, Doğan, and the rest of their supporters were generally known as Apocus (or Turkish "Apocular") or also the Kurdistan Revolutionaries. The group included current leaders of the PKK like Cemil Bayık, Ali Haydar Kaytan and Duran Kalkan. What made Apocus, later the PKK or Kurdistan Workers' Party, different was that it decided to move its activities from Ankara, the capital city, to the southern border towns of Turkey. Unlike most Kurdish political parties, which adopted a rather conservative outlook and were organized around tribal leaders and structures, they had strong convictions and a disciplined but decentralized organization which contributed to a steady rise and growing effectiveness. Much of the early development was inspired by the rise of decolonization movements and their potential to be adapted to the Kurdish question. Transferring to southern border towns with a radical left rhetoric gave the Apocus movement initial resources during a time when Turkey had problems with Syria. Mazlum Doğan and other leftist actors under the lead of Abdullah Öcalan who were participating in the Kurdish student movement continued to organize and eventually developed into an official political party on 25 November 1978 in the village of Fis near Lice. As a result of his determination and devotion, Doğan became a member of the Central Committee of the party. The official name of the party, Partiya Karkerên Kurdistanê, or Kurdistan Workers' Party, was decided on later, in April 1979, during a meeting of the central committee. The meeting in Fis is also later referred to as the First Congress of the PKK. Doğan also became the first chief editor of the party's newspaper Serxwebûn. Shortly after the founding of the party in 1978, forecasting the military coup d’état of Turkey in 1980, thousands of Kurdish and Turkish left-revolutionaries were jailed, leading many of the existing groups to lose their organizational structures. However, the PKK was able to withstand despite suffering many arrests including Mazlum Doğan. But following imprisonment, the captured PKK members set up an elaborate resistance organization that would operate even behind bars. This organization became famous for their hunger strikes. They also smuggled in guns and communication equipment into prison. Recruitment and training became commonplace for imprisoned PKK members.

== Arrest and trial ==
In the fall of 1979, Mazlum Doğan had gone to Viransehir, Şanıurfa, Turkey to assemble the Kurds for political rights activism. He had planned on leaving Turkey and head towards Syria, but was arrested on 30 September over accusations of founding and leading the Kurdistan Workers' Party, what the Turkish coup d'état labeled a terrorist organisation, taking part in the liberation of a comrade from a state hospital in Diyarbakır, and identity document forgery. While facing the court board during his trial, Doğan lashed out expressing his beliefs, something his father urged him not to do. He shrieked in front of the Turkish military court explaining that he will never surrender to them, and that he will never stop asking for Kurdish rights. He became the leading voice of the defendants of the PKK. He declared himself guilty according to Art. 25 of the Turkish criminal law, which saw the death sentence as a punishment, but nevertheless wanted to defend himself in court in order to let the "history judge his words". Following his trial, Turkish military police began beating and torturing him. As the military police beat him, Doğan uttered the words, "Serhildan e Berxwedan ", until he collapsed and fell unconscious. As a political prisoner, he was required to wear a prison uniform but he continuously refused. He was beaten and told it would stop only if he sung the Turkish national anthem but he refused to sing leading to further beating and torture.

== Suicide ==
On 21 March 1982, Newroz day, Mazlum Doğan set his prison cell on fire and hanged himself in protest against the Turkish government and the relentless conditions inside Diyarbakir prison and other penitentiaries across Turkey. Prior to taking his life, he lit three matches, placing them on the table in his cell leaving the message, "Surrender leads to Betrayal, Resistance leads to Victory". With the inhumane conditions of the prison-torture system of Diyarbakir prison, where prisoners were subject to extreme forms of abuse, such as, sexual violence, rape, psychological terror, beatings, electro-shocks, and being forced to eat dog excrement, the state tried to break all belief in the prisoners' ideals, dreams and utopias. The headline 'Diyarbakir Cezaevinde Katliam' (Massacre in Diyarbakir Prison) was used by Serxwebûn to announce the death of Doğan in June 1982. His death sparked the Diyarbakir prison resistance movement. This triggered popular support and prompted the PKK's definite decision to take up guerrilla warfare against the state on 15 August 1984. Following Mazlum Doğan's action, four inmates, Ferhat Kurtay, Eşref Anyık, Necmi Öner and Mahmut Zengin lit themselves on fire in protest.

== Commemoration ==
After Doğan's death, the PKK magazines Serxwebûn and Berxwedan published an obituary in 1982. Throughout the 1980s and 1990s, Serxwebûn and Berxwedan continued to publish commemoration articles regarding the acts of resistance from Doğan as well as other important figures such as Gülnaz Karataş and Zekiye Alkan. PKK articles remembering Mazlum Doğan and other influential Kurdish figures are not uncommon even today. Since 1997, every year a Kurdish youth festival bearing his name is held. The PKK commemorates him as a modern Kawa.

In a statement regarding her son, Doğan's mother explained that “he lived not just for the Kurds, but for all of humanity.” Mazlum dreamed of a Middle East that was free of oppression. He had visualized an idea of a confederation of the Middle Eastern community along with Kemal Pir.

== Literature ==
- Serdar Çelik: Die Geschichte des 15. August. Zehn Jahre bewaffneter Befreiungskampf in Nordkurdistan self-publishing company 1995
- Mehdi Zana: Prison No 5: Eleven Years in Turkish Jails published by: Blue Crane Books, Cambridge, MA 1997 ISBN 978-1-886434-05-9
- Mursit Demirkol: Die PKK und die Kurdenfrage in der Türkei: Entstehung, Entwicklung, Lösung (German Edition) published by: Verlag für Wissenschaft und Bildung, Berlin 1995 ISBN 978-3-86135-057-6
