= Serxwebûn =

Journal and official organ of the Kurdistan Workers' Party

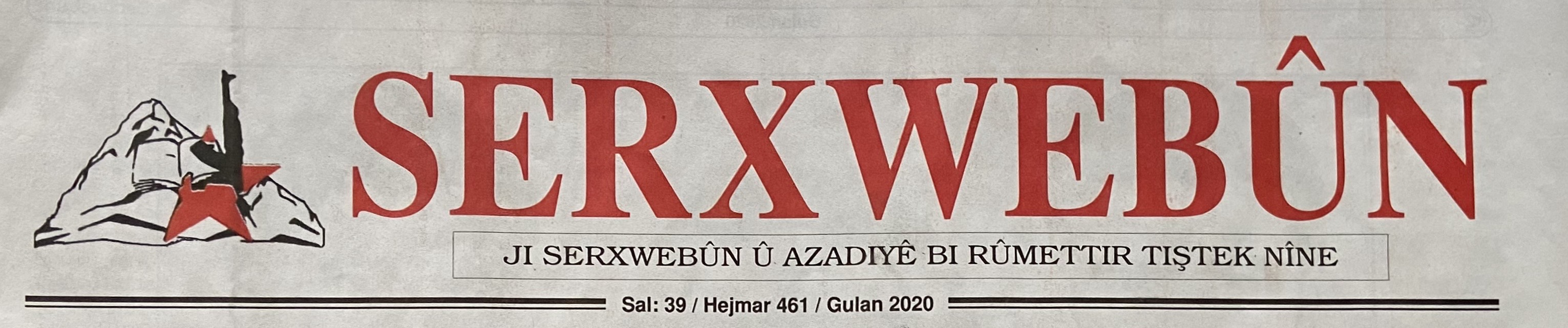
- Frequency: Monthly
- Founded: 1979
- Final issue Number: May 2025; No. 521
- Website: serxwebun.org

Serxwebûn (Kurdish for 'Independence') was a journal and official organ of the Kurdistan Workers' Party (PKK). It was established in 1979, printed in the Netherlands and published monthly. It published the speeches and views of the political leadership of the PKK but also kept extensive records of the fallen fighters of the People's Defence Forces (HPG), the armed wing of the PKK. Its first editor in chief was Mazlum Doğan. It was often cited by scholars of the conflict between Turkey and the PKK. The publication ceased in 2025, with dissolution the PKK.

== See also ==
- Kon (magazine)
