= Eruh =

- Municipality
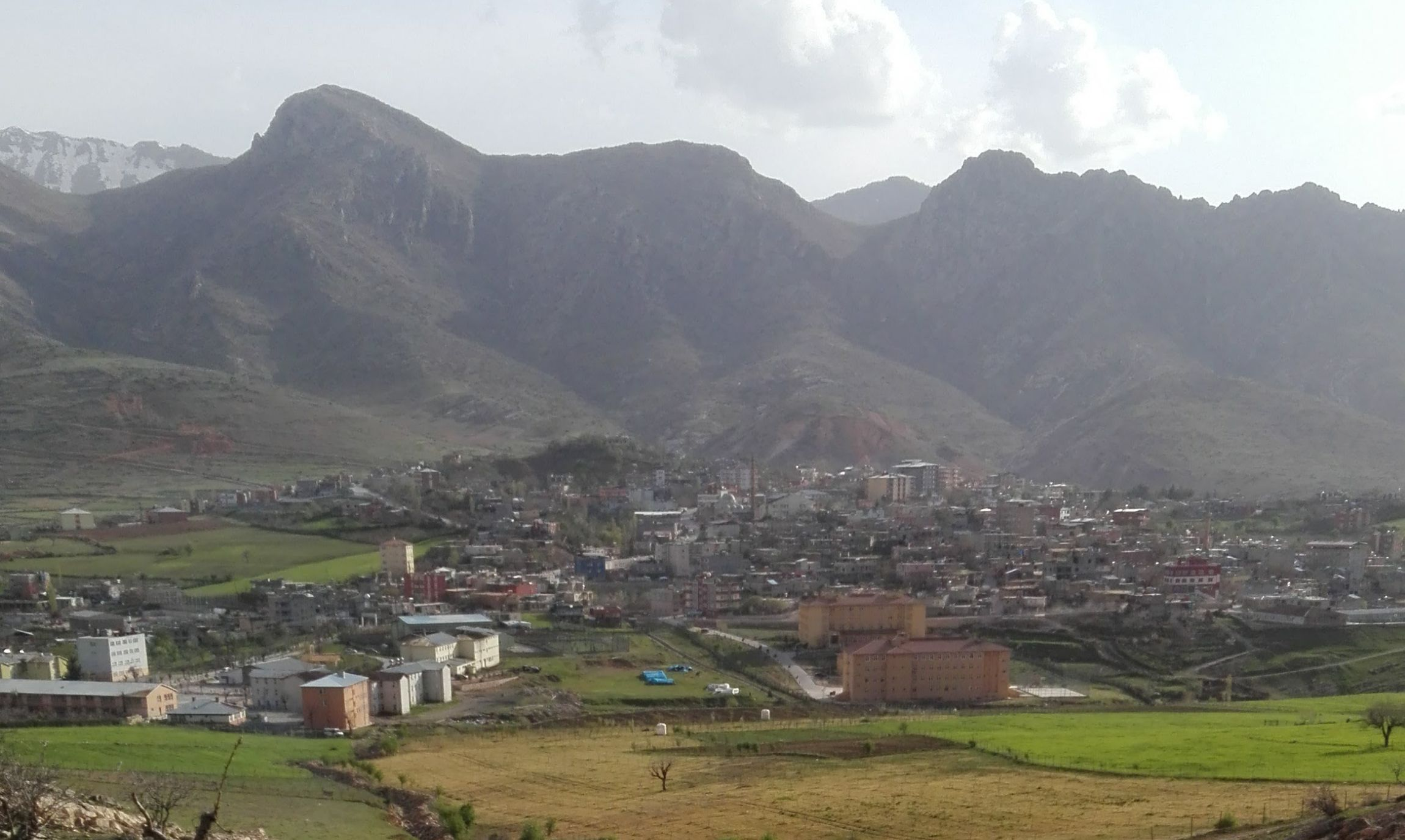

- Location within Turkey
- Coordinates: 37°44′59″N 42°10′47″E
- Country: Turkey
- Province: Siirt
- District: Eruh

Government
  - Mayor: Cevher Çiftçi (AKP)
- Population (2021): 8,895
- Time zone: UTC+3 (TRT)
- Website: www.eruh.bel.tr

Eruh (Kurdish: Dih, Armenian: Դեհ, romanized: Dih) is a town and seat of Eruh District of Siirt Province of Turkey.

The town is populated by Kurds of the Botikan tribe and had a population of 8,895 in 2021.

== Neighborhoods ==
Eruh town is divided into the three neighborhoods of Farih, Sarıgül and Dih.

== Politics ==
In the local elections of March 2019 Cevher Çiftçi was elected mayor. The current District Governor is Ali Erdoĝan.

Municipality in Eruh

== History ==
Eruh was the location of one of two attacks by the Kurdistan Workers' Party (PKK) on the 15 August 1984.

In 2013, the Armenian St. John's Church (Surb Hovhannes) in the Dih district of Eruh, Turkey, was turned into an Islamic religious school for girls.

== Demographics ==
According to the Armenian Patriarchate of Constantinople, in 1914 there were 3,393 Armenians in the kaza of Eruh, including 2,412 in Eruh proper. They were slaughtered by the forces commanded by Halil Kut and Djevdet Bey during the Armenian genocide.

The 1927 Turkish census gives a population of 14,910 for the district. 14,451 of them declared being native Kurdish speakers. 14,482 declared being Muslims.
