= Halil Uysal =

Film Director and Producer

- Born: 1973; Germany
- Died: 1 April 2008 (aged 34–35); Besta, Şırnak Province, Turkey
- Cause of death: Killed in Action
- Other name: Halil Daĝ
- Occupations: Journalist and Film Director
- Employer: Med TV
- Organization: PKK
- Notable work: Berîtan (2006)

Halil Ibrahim Uysal (Kurdish: Xelîl Uysal; 1973 – April 2008) was a German-born journalist and film director mainly focused on reporting on the Kurdish liberation movement. He later changed his surname to Daĝ.

== Family and early life ==
He was born in Germany to a father of Turkish origin and a mother of Kurdish origin. After having finished primary school in Germany he studied at a private college in İzmir, Turkey. After studying in İzmir he came back to Germany and began to work and take additional courses in photography. As in 1994 with MED TV the first Kurdish satellite channel was founded, he was involved as a camera man and one of its few staff members.

== Life with the PKK ==
In 1994 he and a cameraman travelled to Damascus, Syria to film an interview with Abdullah Öcalan. He later declared that it was during this interview it became clear to him that he wanted to become a member of the Kurdistan Workers' Party (PKK). The cameraman returned alone in May 1995. Dag was trained for 6 months in political ideology in a camp in Damascus. From late 1995 on, he was stationed mainly in Iraqi Kurdistan and active in the media unit of the PKK. He filmed and his reports were aired by MED TV. In 1997 a video of his, in which could be seen, how the PKK shot down a Turkish helicopter, was a major media event for militant Kurds. In this time he also wrote articles for several Kurdish news agencies. After the expulsion of Syria of the PKK and the capture of Öcalan the movement had to adjust to the new circumstances. Therefore, the Sehit Sefkan Culture and Arts School was founded of which he became a member. He began filming movies. In his movies the actors were not professional actors but PKK fighters who often acted for the first time in a movie. In total he made 6 movies with durations between 29 minutes and 162 minutes. Some of his movies like Kilamek ji Zagrosé can be viewed as documentary films and had a focus on the PKK fighters life in the nature. There are several close-up takes of flowers and mountain goats and wide panoramas of the mountainous landscape. Other films are more narrative and most treat of real events.

His most famous movie is Berîtan, a movie about Gülnaz Karataş, a female PKK fighter who fought until the last bullet against Kurdistan Democratic Party (KDP) Peshmerga who have allied themselves with the Turkish army and preferred to jump off a cliff instead of being captured.

== Last project and death ==
In 2007 he had the project of filming the journey of PKK fighters from Iraqi Kurdistan to Tunceli, Turkey, a journey that usually lasted about two months. During the journey clashes broke out and he got wounded. He was saved by a comrade and continued with the journey, but he was killed in a clash with the Turkish army on the 1st of April 2008 in Besta, Sirnak.

== Filmography ==
- Tirej (Ray of Light, 2002)
- Eyna Bejne (Tall Mirror, 2002)
- Kilamek ji Zagrosé (One Ballad for Zagros, 2004)
- Firmeskên Ava Zê (Tears of Zap, 2005)
- Bêrîtan (2006)

== Publications ==
- Botan’ın Günlüğü Beni Bağışlayın (Turkish), Mezopotamya Press

== See also ==
- Kurdish cinema
