= Uysal =

Uysal is a Turkish surname. Notable people with the surname include:

- Elif Uysal, Turkish electrical engineer
- Mevlüt Uysal (born 1966), Turkish lawyer and mayor of Istanbul
- Necip Uysal (born 1991), Turkish footballer
- Soner Uysal (born 1977), Turkish footballer
- Vedat Uysal (born 1962), Turkish footballer
- Halil Uysal (1973-April 2006) Kurdish journalist and film producer
