= Ziya Pir =

Turkish politician

Ziya Pir MP
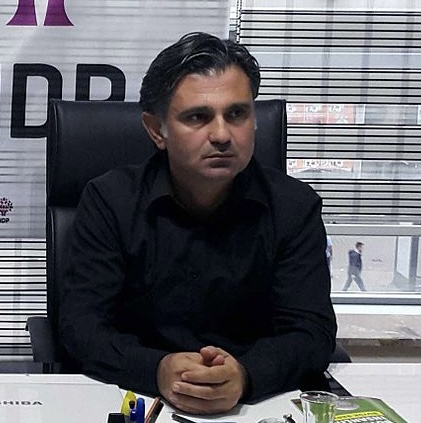
- Ziya Pir in 2015

Member of the Grand National Assembly
- Incumbent
- Assumed office 7 June 2015
- Constituency: Diyarbakır

Personal details
- Born: 1970 (age 55–56) Torul, Gümüşhane Province, Turkey
- Party: People's Democratic Party (HDP)
- Relatives: Kemal Pir (uncle)

Ziya Pir (born 1970 in Torul, Gümüşhane Province, Turkey) is a Turkish and German entrepreneur and politician of the Peoples' Democratic Party (HDP).

== Early life and education ==
Born in Turkey, Pir mostly grew up in Western Germany. Affiliated with the German liberal-conservative Christian Democratic Union (CDU) party, in 1999, Pir joined the CDU German-Turkish Forum. In 2002, he was tasked by Turkish prime minister Recep Tayyip Erdoğan with developing an organization for Turkish expatriates in Germany, the Union of European-Turkish Democrats (UETD). Appalled by both the UETD's increasing alignment with the AKP party and Erdoğans increasingly authoritarian conduct, he later broke with both.

=== Political career in Turkey ===
Pir, who is a nephew of the famous ethnic Turkish co-founder of the Kurdistan Workers' Party, Kemal Pir, in 2015 decided to return to Turkey in order to join the newly founded pro-Kurdish opposition party HDP. In the June 2015 general election he was elected to represent his Diyarbakır constituency in the Turkish parliament and was later confirmed in the November 2015 snap election. In November 2016 he was arrested together with 10 other parliamentarians of the HDP party. He was released from detention after he delivered his testimony concerning an indictment around an alleged insult of a public officer to the prosecutor of Diyarbakir. In late 2017 he received a suspended sentence of 11 months and 20 days for calling the prosecutor who ordered raids on the Dicle Haber Ajansi, Azadiya Welat, KURDÎ-DER and Aram Publishing in Diyarbakır province on 28 September 2015, during which 32 journalists were detained a "candidate as a palace jester". In December 2017, his parliamentary immunity was demanded to be lifted due to him organizing a protest while "sitting on the stairs" in front of the BDP party building in Diyarbakır. On the 17 March 2021, the Turkish state prosecutor before the Court of Cassation Bekir Şahin filed a lawsuit before the Constitutional Court demanding for Pir and 686 other HDP politicians a five-year ban on political activities. The lawsuit was filed together with request for a closure of the HDP due to their alleged organizational links with the PKK.
