= Mahal Baloch =

Pakistani Baloch suicide bomber

Mahal Baloch (Balochi: ماهل بلوچ; Urdu: ماہل بلوچ; 2001-2024), also known by her nom de guerre Zilan Kurd (Balochi: زیلان کُرد), was a Pakistani Baloch suicide bomber of the Balochistan Liberation Army who detonated a car bomb at a Pakistani Army base during the August 2024 Balochistan attacks.

== Life ==
Mahal Baloch was born in 2001 as the fifth of six children in Gwadar, Balochistan. Her father was Kahda Hameed Assa. She graduated from the Faculty of Arts at Degree College Gwadar, and then enrolled in a Bachelor of Laws program at Turbat University in 2021. Her father was a member of the National Awami Party and was a student of Ghaus Bakhsh Bizenjo. She did internships for law practice in Quetta during summer breaks. Mahal Baloch had an average upbringing. Jayend Baloch, a spokesperson for the Balochistan Liberation Army, claimed that Mahal Baloch had officially become a BLA militant in 2022. In 2023, after extensive training, she was admitted to the Majeed Brigade, the BLA special forces. She left her family home on August 23, 2024. She died on August 26 after detonating a car bomb in a Pakistani Army base in Bela, Balochistan during the August 2024 Balochistan attacks. As it was uncommon for women to drive, she drew suspicion as she was driving to the army base. Mahal Baloch shared the same name as a missing woman from Balochistan who was uninvolved with the BLA. After her death, the BLA published a video message that she recorded before the attack. Her alias, Zilan Kurd, was a tribute to Zeynep Kınacı, who she saw as a role model. She was first known by the alias in February 2023, when the YPG declared support for the BLA.

On September 3, 2024, armed Kurdish militants belonging to a small pro-PKK group of the HBDH, entered Şişli Plaza in Istanbul and destroyed, burned, and ransacked Turkish government properties. They claimed that the attack was provoked by the repression of Abdullah Öcalan, and stated "we dedicate this action to the Baloch Liberation Army comrades Zilan Kurd (Mahal Baloch) and Rizwan Baloch (Hamal), who were martyred." Rizwan Baloch, known by his alias Hamal, was another suicide bomber during the BLA attack.
