= Mahsum Korkmaz =

PKK military commander (1956–1986)

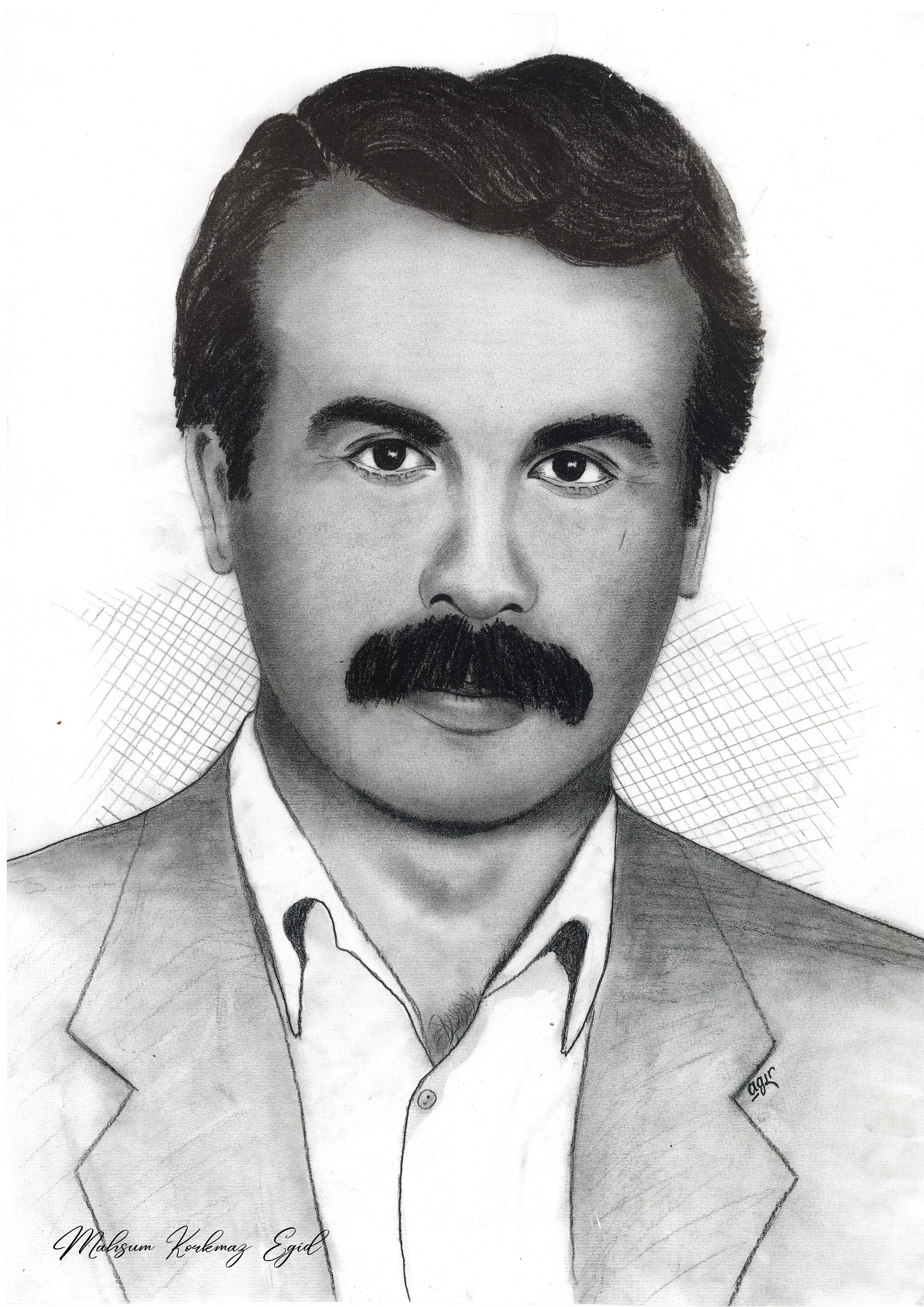
- Born: 1956; Silvan, Diyarbakir, Turkey
- Died: 28 March 1986 (aged 29–30); Mount Gabar, Şırnak, Turkey
- Military career
- Allegiance: Kurdistan Workers' Party (PKK)
- Service years: 1978 – 28 March 1986
- Rank: Military Commander
- Nickname: Agit
- Conflicts: Lebanese Civil War; 1982 Lebanon War; Siege of Beirut; Kurdish–Turkish conflict; PKK Insurgency; 1984 PKK attacks

Mahsum Korkmaz, also known as Agit (Kurdish: عەگید, Egîd) (1956 - 28 March 1986) was the first commander of the Kurdistan Workers' Party (PKK)'s military forces. Korkmaz moved to Lebanon in 1979 and alongside Kemal Pir was responsible for the recruitment across Turkey. He is known to have led the 15 August 1984 PKK attacks which was the start of the PKK's armed rebellion for Kurdish independence. He was killed by Turkish forces on 28 March 1986.

The PKK's main training facility during the 1980s and early 1990s, the Mahsum Korkmaz Academy, which was located in Beqaa Valley in Lebanon was named after him. Today, Mahsum Korkmaz is honored in the form of many commemoration days by the Kurdish Movement. In Lice a statue of Korkmaz was erected in a cemetery on 15 August 2014, the 30th anniversary of the 15 August 1984 attack. The statue was subsequently demolished by Turkish authorities. The PKK denied it had ordered to erect the statue in Lice. On 28 March 2017 a statue of Korkmaz was erected in Kobanî.

Preceded by Office established	Military Commander of the PKK; 1980–1986	Succeeded by Cemil Bayık
