= Zeynep Kınacı =

Member of the Kurdistan Workers' Party (1972–1996)

Zeynep Kınacı (1972–1996), codenamed Zilan, was a member of the Kurdistan Workers' Party (PKK) known for having committed its first suicide attack. The way she carried it out has influenced women's role within the PKK.

== Biography ==
Kinaci was born in a village in Malatya province in 1972 to a family of the Mamureki tribe. She studied social sciences at the Inönü University in Malatya and worked at the state hospital as an X-ray technician. In 1995 she joined the PKK.

=== The suicide attack ===
On the 30 June 1996, Kınacı triggered the explosives near Turkish soldiers in Tunceli who were singing the İstiklal Marşı, killing around ten soldiers while wounding over thirty. Before the attack, she wrote three letters in which she explained her reasons for the suicide attack, one directed to the leadership of the PKK, one to the Women Freedom Fighters and another one to the revolutionary people of Kurdistan. According to her letters, she saw the action executed through her love for humans and life. She saw it as her way to liberate herself from the oppression the Kurds had to go through by Turkey. The suicide attack came in response to a failed assassination attempt on Abdullah Öcalan on the 6 May 1996.

== Recognition ==
Her death had a deep impact on the women's role in the PKK. By the PKK, she was exemplified as the new Ishtar and the female equivalent of a modern Kawa, who personified in Mazlum Dogan, committed suicide on Newroz 1982 in prison in Diyarbakir. Today her nom de guerre Zîlan, but also Mazlum are popular names in the provinces of Diyarbakir and Mardin. In her memory, Gurbetelli Ersöz, the former Editor in Chief of Özgür Gündem adopted as nom de guerre Zeynep after she joined the PKK. In Germany an annual Zilan festival is organized in her memory. She was an inspiration of Mahal Baloch, a Baloch female suicide bomber who also adopted the alias Zilan.

== Personal life ==
Kinaci was married and her husband was in Turkish captivity when she committed suicide.
