= Mahsum Korkmaz Academy =

Training camp of the Kurdistan Workers' Party

The Mahsum Korkmaz Academy is a training camp of the Kurdistan Workers' Party (PKK). It was established in 1986 in Helve, a village in the Beqaa Valley in Lebanon. It is named after Mahsum Korkmaz, a former commander of the armed wing of the PKK. Today the camp is situated in Qandil Mountains, Northern Iraq.

== Foundation and locations ==
To establish the Mahsum Korkmaz Academy was decided at the Third Party Congress of the PKK in October 1986. Its first location was in the Beqaa valley in Lebanon, which at the time was under Syrian control. It had to leave Lebanon due to Turkish pressure in 1992, following which it settled to Damascus, the Syrian capital. After the expulsion of the PKK from Syria in 1998, the academy moved to Iraqi Kurdistan.

== Training ==
It is estimated that about 10'000 militants underwent training in the years between 1986 and 1998 when the academy had to leave Syria and settled in Iraq. In 1991, the education consisted of two months of ideological and one-month military training. After the arrival of new students, they took on a new Kurdish name and delivered an oath to remain loyal to the party line, the martyrs and the leader. The new name was intended to avoid repression and as a sign for the beginning of a new life.

Until 1998, Abdullah Öcalan gave lectures of several hours every week at the academy, which were called Çözümlemeler (Analyses). They consisted of experiences of his own life and followed by the challenge to engage in self-criticism. The students were often reminded that the main battlefield was oneself, who was to become a new human and only to a lesser extent the fight was against an external enemy. Sometimes an attack by the Turkish army was simulated.

=== Free time ===
In some evenings, the students would gather to play football games (in which Öcalan would often also participate). Other activities would be dancing Govend or play volleyball.

== Turkish opposition to the academy ==
In April 1992 the Interior Minister of Turkey Ismet Sezgin pressured the Syrian president Hafez al-Assad to close the camp in Lebanon, following which the PKK then closed it down and speculations arose if the camp would be re-established in either Iran or Cyprus. Ünal Erkan, the Governor of the State of Emergency region in Turkish Kurdistan and the Turkish defense minister Nevzat Ayaz both welcomed its closure at the time.
