= MED TV =

- Broadcast area: Europe, Middle East
- Headquarters: London, United Kingdom

Programming
- Picture format: 576i (4:3 SDTV)

History
- Launched: 15 May 1995; 31 years ago
- Closed: 23 April 1999; 27 years ago

MED TV was the first Kurdish satellite TV with studios in London, England and Denderleeuw, Belgium. MED TV broadcast programs mainly in six languages, Kurdish (Sorani, Kurmanji, and Zaza dialects), English, Arabic, Assyrian and Turkish.

== Programs and audience ==
MED TV Programmes were a varied mix from children's programs, music, documentaries and news broadcasts. A program in which Kurdish books written in the three scripts of Arabic, Kyrillic and Latin were discussed, was moderated by a journalist of Özgür Gündem. It broadcast to Europe, North Africa and the Middle East. Its primary audience was in the Middle East where it was seen by many as a refreshing source of information outside of state censorship. It also has a large audience amongst the Kurdish population scattered throughout Europe. In Turkey, it was forbidden to watch Med TV, people were arrested for having been caught watching its programs. The police would search for satellite dishs in Diyarbakır, which they'd confiscate. Turkey saw MED TV as a part of the Kurdistan Workers' Party (PKK), which it classifies as a terrorist organization. Nonetheless, its shows were very popular amongst Kurds in Turkey.

== Organization ==
At its establishment in 1995, thirteen media workers employed at the Television. Most were amateurs, only one had an education in the field. The company expanded its activities significantly until in 1997, the television counted with 250 employees. The TV had close ties with the newspaper Özgür Gündem, whose chief-editor Gurbetelli Ersöz was also MED TVs chief-editor for Turkish Kurdistan.

== Bans ==
Turkey repeatedly urged providers of satellites to end the broadcast of MED TV. One of the reasons the pro-Kurdish People's Democracy Party (HADEP) was banned in 2003, was allowing people to watch MED TV in the party's offices. HADEP Med TV first broadcast with a license from Independent Television Commission (ITC) and from satellites of Polish Telecom, until the polish government gave in to Turkish demands to ban MED TV. Following the ban in Poland, Med TV rented satellites from USA based Intelsat to broadcast its programs. But Turkey kept on demanding the British Government to take MED TV off the air, and MED TV's license was revoked on April 23, 1999, as their broadcasts were judged as 'likely to encourage or incite crime or lead to disorder'. Its license was revoked just after the arrest of Abdullah Ocalan, the leader of the PKK on request by Turkey.

Following the ban there were widespread allegations of bias on the part of the ITC as the then chairman Sir Robin Biggam had interests in BAE Systems which also had extensive interests in Turkey. Balfour Beatty and the UK Government were also criticized over the ban.

On April 26, 1999, a spokesman for MED-TV said that they were determined to resume broadcasting either in a different country or under a new name.

== Quotations ==
It is not in the public interest to have any broadcaster use the UK as a platform for broadcasts which incite people to violence.

— ITC Chairman Sir Robin Biggam.

When I went to Diyarbakir and Mardin in December 1995 for the Turkish general election, I enquired particularly whether that TV station [Med-TV] was being received and what was the public response. I was told that the viewers were positively rapturous. Old people had wept for joy after such a long period of cultural starvation. For all, it was a new window on the world and, what is more, in their own language.

— Lord Hylton, House of Lords debate on Human Rights in Turkey, 18 July 1997.

== After the ban ==
When Med TV lost its licence in the UK, MEDYA TV started transmissions via a satellite uplink from France in July 1999 and a production studio in Denderleeuw, Belgium. MEDYA TV's licence was revoked by the French authorities in February 2004, the French court believed that the station had ties with PKK; and CSA, the French licensing authority stated that MEDYA TV was a successor to MED-TV, and French Appeal Court confirmed CSA's decision. The channel ran an announcement stating that "A new channel, Roj TV, will begin broadcasting on the first of the month".

Roj TV began transmissions from Denmark on March 1, 2004.

== See also ==
- Kurds in Turkey
- Human rights in Turkey
