= Kon (magazine) =

Former Kurdish-language magazine of the MHP

Kon was a Kurdish language magazine published by the MHP in Turkey in 1979. The magazine was seen as the most liberal act by the MHP, especially at the time.

== History ==
The magazine was first published by Alparslan Türkeş in January 1979, and had published only one issue. The letters Q, W, and X, were used, despite being against the law at the time. Immediately after the distribution of the magazine, which printed 10 thousand issues, two Grey Wolves members who distributed the magazines were killed in Elazığ and Şanlıurfa by the PKK, a small group at that time. In the magazine, it stated that the Turkish nation equally consisted of "Alevis, Sunnis, Turkmens, and Kurds". It was mostly written in a broken Turkish vernacular commonly spoken by Kurds, with one story fully written in Kurdish. In the magazine, the CHP was condemned for various abuses against Kurds. MHP rhetoric on Kon magazine was sharply different from official MHP rhetoric. Shortly after its first issue, the magazine was closed by the Turkish government. The official statement was "Kawa, Roja Welat, Özgürlük Yolu, Halkın Kurtuluşu, and Kon Magazine, which make divisive and destructive publications in Turkey, have been closed indefinitely."
