= 1984 PKK attacks =

1984 battle during the Turkish-Kurdish conflicts

15 August 1984 PKK attacks
- Part of Kurdish–Turkish conflict
Date	15 August 1984
Location	Şemdinli, Hakkâri and Eruh, Siirt, Turkey
Result	Start of the Kurdish–Turkish conflict

Belligerents
Turkey	Kurdistan Workers' Party (PKK)

Commanders and leaders
(Turkey) Unknown	Mahsum Korkmaz; Abdullah Ekinci

Casualties and losses
1 soldier killed 2 police officers killed 7 soldiers wounded 1 police officer wounded	None
- 3 civilians wounded

The 15 August 1984 PKK attacks, which were led by Mahsum Korkmaz (known as "Agit"), marked the start of the last phase of Kurdish–Turkish conflict.

Since the PKK's second party Congress, which was held from 20 to 25 August 1982 in Daraa, Syria, it was decided that the PKK would start preparing for an insurgency inside Turkey. Training camps were opened in Syria and in Lebanon's Beqaa Valley and propaganda teams were sent across the border to make contact with the local populations. After years of preparation, the PKK launched its first major attacks on 15 August 1984. The attack was led by the founder of the PKK's military wing.

PKK forces attacked the gendarmerie station in Eruh, Siirt and killed one gendarmerie soldier and injured six soldiers and three civilians. Simultaneously, PKK forces attacked a gendarmerie open-air facility, officer housings and a gendarmerie station in Şemdinli, Hakkâri and killed two police officers and injured one police officer and a soldier.

Initially, Turkish authorities did not take the attacks seriously, however the attacks were followed up by a raid on a police station in Siirt on 17 August, which was soon followed by an attack that killed three of General Kenan Evren's Presidential Guards in Yüksekova and an ambush which killed 8 Turkish soldiers in Çukurca, in Hakkâri province.

Insurgent violence in the predominantly Kurdish South-East of Turkey escalated heavily after the attacks. Around 2,500 people were killed during the conflict between 15 August 1984 and 1991. This number rose to 17,500 between 1991 and 1992 and the Turkish state puts the number of people killed by the insurgency at 44,000 as of September 2008.
