= Haki Karer =

Turkish politician (1950–1977)

- Born: 1950; Ulubey, Turkey
- Died: 18 May 1977 (aged 26–27); Gaziantep
- Citizenship: Turkish
- Education: Ankara University, Faculty of Physics
- Occupations: Founder of the PKK, Revolutionary
- Organization: PKK

Haki Karer (1950 in Ulubey – 1977 in Gaziantep) was a Turkish leftist activist and is a central figure in the memory of the PKK.

== Education ==
After finishing high school he went to Ankara to study physics at the University of Ankara but left the university before he received a bachelor's degree.

== Political activism ==
In 1972, while living with Kemal Pir they invited Abdullah Öcalan to live with them after he was released from prison in Mamak. Following influential political talks between them and other leftists they decided to form a political movement. In 1973 a small group of people around Abdullah Öcalan and Haki Karer was formed named the Kurdistan Revolutionaries. In November 1973 the Ankara Democratic Association of Higher Education ( Ankara Demokratik Yüksek Öğrenim Demeği, ADYÖD) was founded and soon after, Haki Karer was elected to join its board. ADYÖD was short-lived but was intensely active until its closure in December 1974. The revolutionary movement carried on its struggle and in 1976 it was decided that Öcalan would become the chairman of the movement and Karer his associate. Following this he moved to Gaziantep where he continued his political work.

=== Death and aftermath ===
Karer was killed in a coffeehouse in Gaziantep on 18 May 1977. His body was taken to his hometown Ulubey, where he was buried. The associates of Karer accused Alaattin Kaplan, a member of the Kurdish movement Sterka Sor of murdering of Karer. Kaplan was later killed in Iskenderun.

== Legacy ==
In interviews Öcalan later stated, that the Kurdistan Workers' Party (PKK) was founded as an oath to Haki Karer. After the death of Karer the movement decided to act more professionally and become a party.
