= 1996 Tunceli bombing =

Suicide bombing in Tunceli

- Location: Tunceli, Tunceli Province, Turkey
- Date: 30 June 1996
- Attack type: Suicide bombing
- Deaths: 9 (including the perpetrator)
- Injuries: 29
- Perpetrator: PKK
- Assailant: Zeynep Kınacı

The 1996 Tunceli bombing was a suicide bombing targeting a group of 60 unarmed military personnel who was there for a flag raising ceremony in Tunceli, Turkey on 30 June 1996. The explosion resulted in deaths of eight soldiers (Ali Alıç, Cafer Akıncı, Hakan Akyar, Celal Hatıl, İbrahim Sever, Önder Yağmur, Ahmet Yayman and Yusuf Yıldırım) and Zeynep Kınacı, who was identified as the assailant. 29 soldiers were injured in the attack. It was the first suicide bombing in history of Turkey.
