= Kemal Pir =

Co-founder of Kurdistan Workers Party (1952–1982)

- Born: 1952; Güzeloluk, Gümüşhane Province, Turkey
- Died: 7 September 1982 (aged 29–30); Diyarbakır, Diyarbakır Province, Turkey
- Cause of death: Hunger strike
- Other name: Laz Kemal
- Education: Ankara University
- Political party: Kurdistan Workers' Party
- Relatives: Ziya Pir (nephew)

Kemal Pir (1952 in Güzeloluk, Gümüşhane Province – 7 September 1982 in Diyarbakır, Turkey), also known as Laz Kemal, was a Turkish Marxist–Leninist revolutionary and one of the ethnically Turkish founders of the Kurdistan Workers' Party.

In the early 1970s he studied at Faculty of Literature of Hacettepe University. Influenced by the revolutionary movement led by Abdullah Öcalan, he left the university.

In 1972, living together with Haki Karer in the same house, they received Öcalan after he was released from Mamak prison. At the foundation meeting of the PKK in November 1978, he was elected a member of the central committee.

He was arrested in Batman in 1979 and imprisoned in the Diyarbakir Prison. During his trial he declared that the PKK would begin a peoples revolt when the time was right. While on hunger strike in prison, he was asked by the head of prison "Don't you love life, Kemal?" and famously answered: "We love life so much we are prepared to die for it." He died due to a hunger strike in 1982.

His nephew Ziya Pir is a politician of the HDP
