= Kurdistan Workers' Party =

Kurdish militant political organization

- Partiya Karkerên Kurdistanê (Kurdish)
- Flag (since 2005)
- Leaders: Major leaders: Abdullah Öcalan (POW); Murat Karayılan; Cemîl Bayik; Duran Kalkan; Şemdin Sakık (POW); Nizamettin Taş; Mahsum Korkmaz †; Besê Hozat; Bahoz Erdal; Ali Haydar Kaytan †; Haki Karer †; Mazlum Doğan (POW); Osman Öcalan #; Celal Başkale †; Nuriye Kesbir; Mustafa Karasu; Kani Yilmaz †; Kemal Pir (POW)
- Founded: 27 November 1978
- Dissolved: To be determined (Note: Despite the PKK's 12th Congress announcing plans for total organisational dissolution, the PKK has not yet been dissolved de facto or de jure.)
- Allegiance: Kurdistan Communities Union (since 2005); Peoples' United Revolutionary Movement (2016–2025)
- Groups: People's Defence Forces (2000–2025); Free Women's Units (2004–2025); Civil Defense Units (2015–2025); Patriotic Revolutionary Youth Movement (2006–2015)
- Headquarters: Qandil Mountains, Kurdistan Region, Iraq
- Ideology: Kurdish nationalism (disputed); Democratic confederalism; Libertarian socialism; Progressivism; Anti-capitalism; Anti-imperialism; Communalism; Jineology; Historical: Marxism–Leninism; Maoism
- Political position: Far-left
- Size: 5,000 (estimate) (Note: Estimates range from 4,000 to 7,000 members.)
- Wars: Kurdistan Workers' Party insurgency; Kurdish Hezbollah insurgency; Israel–PKK conflict; Lebanese Civil War; 1982 Lebanon War; Kurdistan Region–PKK conflict; Kurdish Civil War; Syrian Civil War; Eastern Syria insurgency; Iraqi-Kurdish conflict; War in Iraq (2013–2017); 2017 Iraqi–Kurdish conflict

The Kurdistan Workers' Party (Note: Kurdish: پارتی کرێکارانی کوردستان, romanized: Partiya Karkerên Kurdistan, Kurdish: پارتیی کرێکارانی کوردستان, romanized: Partiya Karkerên Kurdistanê [pɑ:ɾti:jɑ: kɑ:ɾkɛre:n kʊrdɪstɑ:n]) (PKK) is a Kurdish militant political organization and armed guerrilla group primarily based in the mountainous Kurdish-majority regions of southeastern Turkey, northern Iraq and north-eastern Syria. It was founded in Ziyaret, Lice, on 27 November 1978 and was involved in asymmetric warfare in the Kurdistan Workers' Party insurgency (with several ceasefires between 1993 and 2013–2015). Although the PKK initially sought an independent Kurdish state, in the 1990s, its official platform changed to seeking autonomy and increased political and cultural rights for Kurds within Turkey.

The PKK is designated as a terrorist organization by Turkey, the United States, the European Union, Australia, and Japan. Some analysts and organizations disagree with this designation, believing that the PKK no longer engages in organized terrorist activities or systemically targets civilians. (Note: Attributed to multiple sources:) Turkey has often characterized the demand for education in Kurdish as supporting terrorist activities by the PKK. Finland and Sweden's alleged support for the PKK is one of the points which caused Turkey to oppose Finland and Sweden's NATO accession bids.

The PKK's ideology was originally a fusion of revolutionary socialism and Marxism–Leninism with Kurdish nationalism, seeking the foundation of an independent Kurdistan. The PKK was formed as part of a growing discontent over the suppression of Turkey's Kurds, in an effort to establish linguistic, cultural, and political rights for the Kurdish minority. Following the military coup of 1980, the Kurdish language was officially prohibited in public and private life. Many who spoke, published, or sang in Kurdish were arrested and imprisoned. The Turkish government denied the existence of Kurds and the PKK was portrayed trying to convince Turks of being Kurds.

The PKK has been involved in armed clashes with Turkish security forces since 1979, but the full-scale insurgency did not begin until 15 August 1984, when the PKK announced a Kurdish uprising. Since the conflict began, more than 40,000 people have died, most of whom being Turkish Kurdish civilians. In 1999, PKK leader Abdullah Öcalan was captured and imprisoned. In May 2007, serving and former members of the PKK set up the Kurdistan Communities Union (KCK), an umbrella organisation of Kurdish organisations in Turkish, Iraqi, Iranian, and Syrian Kurdistan. In 2013, the PKK declared a ceasefire and began slowly withdrawing its fighters to Iraqi Kurdistan as part of a peace process with the Turkish state. The ceasefire broke down in July 2015. Both the PKK and the Turkish state have been accused of engaging in terror tactics and targeting civilians. The PKK has bombed city centres and recruited child soldiers, and conducted several attacks that massacred civilians. (Note: Attributed to multiple sources:) Turkey has depopulated and burned down thousands of Kurdish villages and massacred Kurdish civilians in an attempt to root out PKK militants. (Note: Attributed to multiple sources:)

On 1 March 2025, the PKK declared a ceasefire with Turkey, and on 12 May, announced plans for a total dissolution of the organisation. In August 2026 a law was passed by the Turkish parliament which would give conditional pardon for thousands of fighters in the party. It would take full effect when the National Security Council agrees that the PKK has fully disbanded and surrendered its weapons. Members convicted of intentional homicide or sentenced to life terms before 2005 would not be included.

== Background ==
As a result of the Turkish military coup of 1971, many militants of the revolutionary left were deprived of a public appearance. Movements like the People's Liberation Army of Turkey (THKO) or the Communist Party of Turkey/Marxist–Leninist (TKP-ML) were cracked down upon and forbidden. Subsequently, several of the remaining political actors of the Turkish left organized away from the public in university dorms or in meetings in shared apartments. In 1972–1973, the organization's core ideological group was made up largely of students led by Abdullah Öcalan ("Apo") in Ankara who made themselves known as the "Kurdistan Revolutionaries". The new group focused on the oppressed Kurdish population of Turkish Kurdistan in a capitalist world. In 1973, several students, who later became founders of the PKK, established the student organization Ankara Democratic Association of Higher Education (ADYÖD), which would be banned the next year. Then a group around Öcalan split from the Turkish left and held extensive discussions focusing on the colonization of Kurdistan by Turkey. Following the military coup of 1980, the Kurdish language was officially prohibited in public and private life. Many who spoke, published, or sang in Kurdish were arrested and imprisoned. At this time, expressions of Kurdish culture, including the use of the Kurdish language, dress, folklore, and names, were banned in Turkey. In an attempt to deny their separate existence from Turkish people, the Turkish government categorized Kurds as "Mountain Turks" until 1991. The PKK was then formed as part of a growing discontent over the suppression of Kurds in Turkey, in an effort to establish linguistic, cultural, and political rights for Turkey's Kurdish minority.

Following several years of preparation, the Kurdistan Workers Party was established during a foundation congress on 26 and 27 November 1978 in the rural village of Fîs, Lice, Diyarbakır. On 27 November 1978, a central committee consisting of seven people was elected, with Abdullah Öcalan as its head. Other members were: Şahin Dönmez, Mazlum Doğan, Haki Karer (an ethnic Turk), Mehmet Hayri Durmuş, Mehmet Karasungur, Cemîl Bayîk. The party program Kürdistan Devrimci Yolu drew on Marxism and saw Kurdistan as a colonized entity. Initially the PKK concealed its existence and only announced their existence in a propaganda stunt when they attempted to assassinate a politician of the Justice Party, Mehmet Celal Bucak, in July 1979. Bucak was a Kurdish tribal leader accused by the PKK of exploiting peasants and collaborating with the Turkish state to oppress Kurds.

== Ideology and aims ==
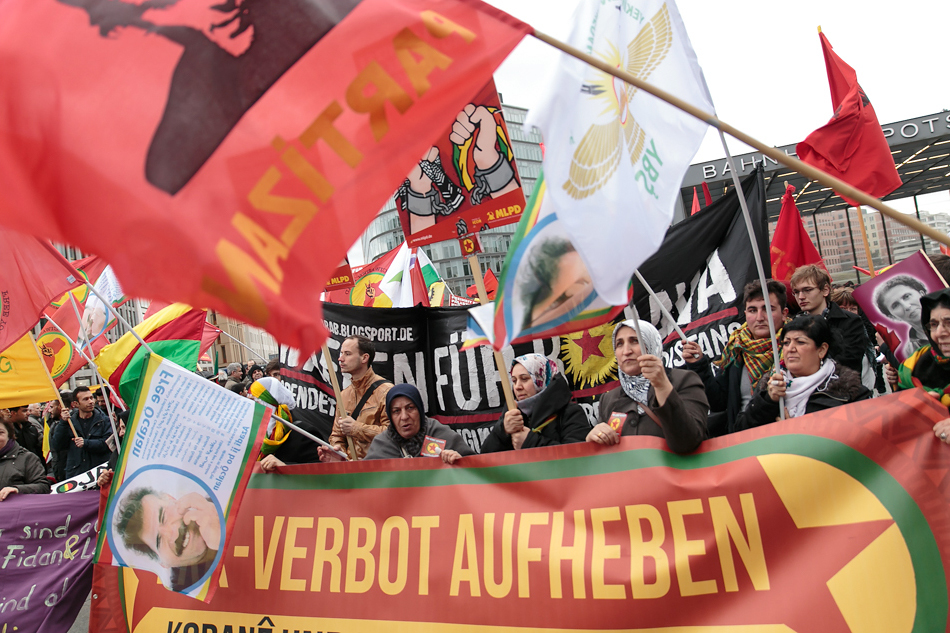
Protest for freedom of Öcalan in Germany, 21 January 2016

The organization originated in the early 1970s from the radical left and drew its membership from other existing leftist groups, mainly Dev-Genç. During the 1980s, the movement included and cooperated with other ethnic groups, including ethnic Turks, who were following the radical left. The PKK had attracted certain ethnic Turks since its foundation, and in the early years of the PKK, the group counted as many Turkish members as Kurdish members. The high-ranking Turks within the PKK included Duran Kalkan, Kemal Pir, and Haki Karer.

The PKK initially presented itself as part of the worldwide communist revolution. Its aims and objectives have evolved over time towards the goals of national autonomy a federation similar the one of Switzerland, Germany or the United States and democratic confederalism.

Around 1995, the PKK ostensibly changed its aim from independence to a demand for equal rights and Kurdish autonomy within the Turkish state, though all the while hardly suspending their military attacks on the Turkish state except for ceasefires in 1999–2004 and 2013–2015. In 1995, Öcalan said: "We are not insisting on a separate state under any condition. What we are calling for very openly is a state model where a people's basic economic, cultural, social, and political rights are guaranteed".

Whilst this shift in the mid-nineties has been interpreted as one from a call for independence to an autonomous republic, some scholars have concluded that the PKK still maintains independence as the ultimate goal, but through society-building rather than state-building.

The PKK has in March 2016 also vowed to overthrow the Turkish government of Recep Tayyip Erdoğan, through the 'Peoples' United Revolutionary Movement'.

The organization has adapted the new democratic confederalist views of its arrested leader, which aim to replace the United Nations, capitalism and nation state with the democratic confederalism which is described as a system of popularly elected administrative councils, allowing local communities to exercise autonomous control over their assets while linking to other communities via a network of confederal councils. Followers of Öcalan and members of the PKK are known, after his honorary name, as Apocu (Apo-ites) under his movement, Apoculuk (Apoism). The slogan Bijî Serok Apo, which translates into Long Live leader Apo, is often chanted by his sympathizers.

=== Religion ===
While the PKK has no known Islamist or practicing religious member among its leadership, it has supported the creation of religious organizations. It has also supported Friday prayers to be in Kurdish instead of the Turkish language. Öcalan's early writings did not have a positive view of Islam, but later works had a more favorable tone, specifically regarding the revolutionary activity of Muhammad against an established order, as well as the role Islam can play in reconciliation between Kurds and Turks. The PKK was accused of having a presence in mosques in Germany to attract religious Muslim Kurds into their ranks. Öcalan had respect for Zoroastrianism and saw it as the first religion of the Kurds.

== Organization ==
Even though the PKK had several prominent representatives in various countries such as Iraq, Iran, Syria, Russia, and Europe, Abdullah Öcalan stayed the unchallenged leader of the organization. Today, though serving life imprisonment, Öcalan is still considered the honorary leader and figurehead of the organization.

Murat Karayılan led the organization from 1999 to 2013. In 2013 Cemil Bayik and Besê Hozat assumed as the first joint leadership. Cemil Bayik was one of the core leaders since its foundation. The organization appointed "Doctor Bahoz", nom de guerre of Fehman Huseyin, a Syrian Kurd, in charge of the movement's military operations signifying the long-standing solidarity among Kurds from all parts of Kurdistan.

=== Political and popular wing ===
In 1985, the National Liberation Front of Kurdistan (Kurdish: Eniye Rizgariye Navata Kurdistan, ERNK) was established by the PKK as its popular front wing, with the role of both creating propaganda for the party, and as an umbrella organization for PKK organizations in different segments of the Kurdish population, such as the peasantry, workers, youth, and women. It was dissolved in 1999, after the capture of Abdullah Öcalan.

=== Cultural branch ===
In 1983, the Association of Artists (Hunerkom) was established in Germany under the lead of the music group Koma Berxwedan. Its activities spread over Kurdish community centers in France, Germany and the Netherlands. In 1994 the Hunerkom was renamed into the 'Kurdish Academy of Culture and Arts'. Koma Berxwedans songs, which often were about the PKK resistance, were forbidden in Turkey and had to be smuggled over the border.

=== Armed wing ===
The PKK had an armed wing, originally formed in 1984 as the Kurdistan Freedom Brigades (Kurdish: Hêzên Rizgariya Kurdistan, HRK), renamed to the People's Liberation Army of Kurdistan (Kurdish: Arteşa Rizgariya Gelî Kurdistan, ARGK) in 1986, and again renamed to the People's Defence Forces (Kurdish: Hêzên Parastina Gel, HPG) in 1999.

=== Women's armed wing ===
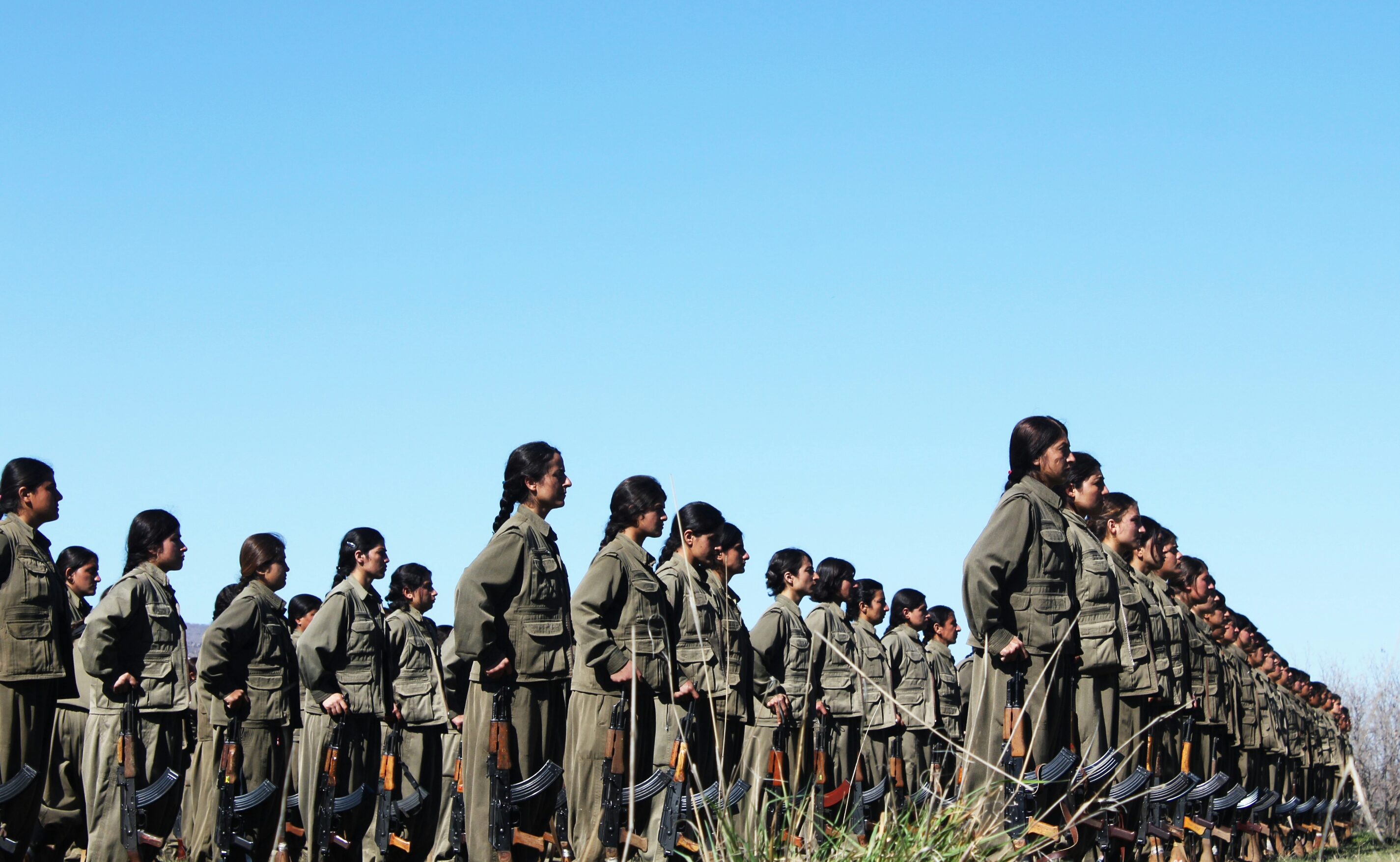
Female PKK guerrillas of YJA-STAR.

The Free Women's Units of Star (Kurdish: Yekîneyên Jinên Azad ên Star, YJA-STAR) was established in 2004 as the women's armed wing of the PKK, emphasizing the issue of women's liberation.

=== Youth wing ===
The Civil Protections Units (YPS) is the successor of the Patriotic Revolutionary Youth Movement (YDG-H), the youth wing of the PKK. In February 2016 the ANF news agency reported the establishment of the women's branch of the YPS, the YPS-Jin.

=== Training camps ===
The first training camps were established in 1982 in Turkey, Iraq, Syria, Iran and also in Beqaa Valley with the support of the Syrian government. In the third party congress of October 1986, the PKK established the Mahsum Korkmaz Academy in the Beqaa Valley. After Turkey pressured Syria to enforce its closure in 1992, the academy moved to Damascus. After the Iran-Iraq War and the Kurdish Civil War, the PKK moved all its camps to Northern Iraq in 1998. The PKK had also completely moved to Qandil Mountains from Beqaa Valley, under intensive pressure, after Syria expelled Öcalan and shut down all camps established in the region. The PKK was possibly inspired by other Kurdish groups who settled there earlier, such as Komala and Jund al-Islam (predecessor of Ansar al-Islam). At the time, Northern Iraq was experiencing a vacuum of control after the Gulf War-related Operation Provide Comfort. Instead of a single training camp that could be easily destroyed, the organization created many small camps. During this period the organization set up a fully functioning enclave with training camps, storage facilities, and reconnaissance and communications centers.

In 2007, the organization was reported to have camps strung out through the mountains that straddle the border between Turkey and Iraq, including in Sinaht, Haftanin, Kanimasi and Zap. The organization developed two types of camps. The mountain camps, located in Turkey, Iraq and Iran, are used as forward bases from which militants carry out attacks against Turkish military bases. The units deployed there are highly mobile and the camps have only minimal infrastructure. The other permanent camps, in the Qandil Mountains of Iraq, have more developed infrastructure—including a field hospital, electricity generators and a large proportion of the PKK's lethal and non-lethal supplies. The organization is also using the Qandil mountain camps for its political activities. It was reported in 2004 that there was another political training camp in Belgium, evidence that the organization had used training camps in Europe for political and ideological training.

=== Political representation ===
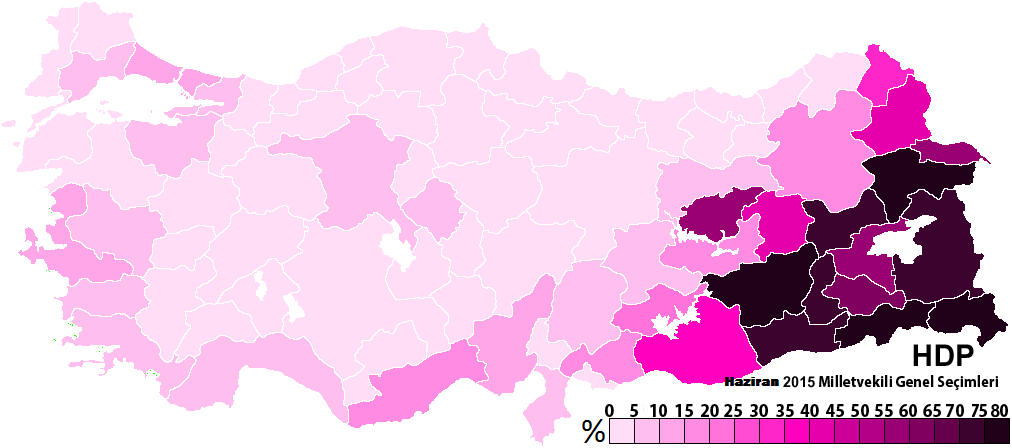
Percentage of the popular vote won by the pro-Kurdish Peoples' Democratic Party (HDP) in the 2015 Turkish general election. According to Egemen Bezci and Nicholas Borroz, "[t]he HDP's elections results . . . are a proxy indicator of popular support for the PKK".

The PKK could count on support from protests and demonstrations often directed against policies of the Turkish government. The PKK also fought a turf war against other radical Islamist Kurdish and Turkish organizations in Turkey. Turkish newspapers said that the PKK effectively used the prison force to gain appeal among the population which PKK has denied.

==== Alleged political representation ====
The organization had sympathizer parties in the Grand National Assembly of Turkey since the beginning of the early 1990s. The existence of direct links between the parties and the PKK have several times been a question in Turkish politics but also in Turkish and European courts. In sequence HEP/DEP/HADEP/DEHAP/DTP and the BDP, which later changed its name to Democratic Regions Party (DBP) on 11 July 2014, as well as the HDP and then DEM have been criticized of sympathizing with the PKK, since they have refused to brand it as a terrorist group.

Political organizations established in Turkey are banned from propagating or supporting separatism. Several political parties supporting Kurdish rights have been reportedly banned on this pretext. The constitutional court stated to find direct links between the HEP/DEP/HADEP and the PKK. In 2007 against the DTP was initiated a closure case before the constitutional court which resulted in its closure on 11 December 2009. In 2021, against the HDP was also initiated a closure case during which the HDP is accused of being linked to the PKK. It is reported that Turkey has used the PKK as an excuse to close Kurdish political parties. Senior DTP leaders maintained that they support a unified Turkey within a democratic framework. In May 2007, the co-president of DTP Aysel Tuğluk, published an article in Radikal in support of this policy.

Several parliamentarians and other elected representatives have been jailed for speaking in Kurdish, carrying Kurdish colors or otherwise allegedly "promoting separatism", most famous among them being Leyla Zana. The European Court of Human Rights has condemned Turkey for arresting and executing Kurdish writers, journalists and politicians in numerous occasions. Between 1990 and 2006 Turkey was condemned to pay €33 million in damages in 567 cases. The majority of the cases were related to events that took place in southeastern Anatolia. In Iraq the political party Tevgera Azadî is said to have close to the PKK.

=== Reported links with Turkish intelligence ===
During the controversial Ergenekon trials in Turkey, allegations have been made that the PKK was linked to elements of the Turkish intelligence community.

Şamil Tayyar, author and member of the ruling AK Party, said that Öcalan was released in 1972 after just three months' detention on the initiative of the National Intelligence Organization (Millî İstihbarat Teşkilatı, MİT), and that his 1979 escape to Syria was aided by elements in MİT. Öcalan has admitted making use of money given by the MIT to the PKK, which he says was provided as part of MIT efforts to control him.

Former police special forces member Ayhan Çarkın said that the state, using the clandestine Ergenekon network, colluded with militant groups such as the PKK, Dev-Sol and Turkish Hezbollah, with the goal of profiting from the war.

The secret witness "First Step" testified that General Levent Ersöz, former head of JITEM, had frequent contact with PKK commander Cemîl Bayik.

== History ==
=== 1970s ===
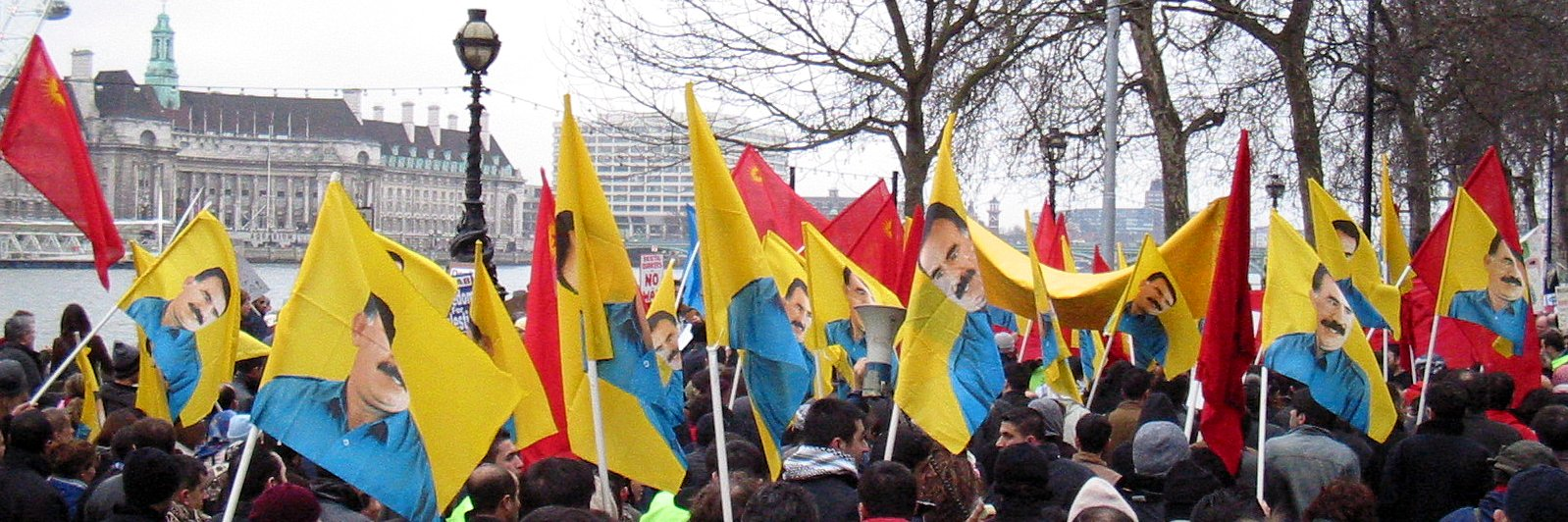
PKK supporters at 2003 march opposing the Iraq War, London

During the 1970s, the PKK was involved in urban warfare. PKK tactics were based on ambush, sabotage, riots, protests, and demonstrations against the Turkish government. During these years, the PKK also fought a turf war against Kurdish and Turkish radical Islamist organisations in Turkey. Turkish newspapers said that the PKK effectively used the prison force to appeal to the general population, which the PKK has denied. In Turkey, this period was characterized by violent clashes that culminated in the 1980 military coup.

=== 1980s ===
The 1980 Turkish coup d'état brought a difficult environment for the PKK, with members being executed, or being jailed. Other fled to Syria, where they were allowed to establish bases by Hafez al-Assad. The PKK also managed to come to agreements with the Democratic Front for the Liberation of Palestine (DFLP), the Fatah of Yassir Arafat or the Palestinian Popular Struggle Front (PPSF) of Samir Ghawshah and also with Masoud Barzani's Kurdistan Democratic Party (KDP) in Iraqi Kurdistan which would facilitate their activities.

In a second phase, which followed the return of civilian rule in 1983, escalating attacks were made on the government's military and vital institutions all over the country. The objective was to destabilize the Turkish authority through a long, low-intensity confrontation. The establishment of the Kurdistan Liberation Force (Hêzên Rizgariya Kurdistan – HRK) was announced on 15 August 1984. From 1984, the PKK became a paramilitary group with training camps in Turkish Kurdistan, Iraqi Kurdistan, Syria, Lebanon and France. The PKK received significant support from the Syrian government, which allowed it to maintain headquarters in Damascus, as well as some support from the governments of Iran, Iraq, and Libya. It began to launch attacks and bombings against Turkish governmental installations, the military, and various institutions of the state. The organization focused on attacks against Turkish military targets, although civilian targets were also hit.

In addition to skirmishing with Turkish military, police forces and local village guards, the PKK has conducted bomb attacks on government and police installations. Kidnapping and assassination against government and military officials and Kurdish tribal leaders who were named as puppets of the state were performed as well. Widespread acts of sabotage were continued from the first stage. Turkish sources had also stated that the PKK carried out kidnappings of tourists, primarily in Istanbul, but also at different resorts. However, the PKK had in its history arrested 4 tourists and released them all after warning them to not enter the war zone. The vast majority of PKK's actions have taken place mainly in Turkey against the Turkish military, although it has on occasions co-operated with other Kurdish nationalist paramilitary groups in neighboring states, such as Iraq and Iran. The PKK has also attacked Turkish diplomatic and commercial facilities across Western Europe in the late 1980s. In effect, the Turkish state has led a series of counter-insurgency operations against the PKK, accompanied by political measures, starting with an explicit denunciation of separatism in the 1982 Constitution, and including proclamation of the state of emergency in various PKK-controlled territories starting in 1983 (when the military relinquished political control to the civilians). This series of administrative reforms against terrorism included in 1985 the creation of village guard system by the then prime minister Turgut Özal. The establishment of the Village Guards resulted into a change of policy by the PKK, who reorganized its military wing at the 3rd party congress in October 1986 and made the joining of its military wing the Kurdistan People's Liberation Force compulsory.

=== 1990s ===
From the mid-1990s, the organization began to lose the upper hand in its operations as a consequence of a change of tactics by Turkey and Syria's steady abandonment of support for the group. The group also had lost its support from Saddam Hussein. As during the international operation Poised Hammer the collaboration between Barzani and Turkey embittered, the situation for the PKK became even more difficult, with Barzani condemning terrorist attacks by the PKK during a Newroz festival. At the same time, the Turkish government started to use more violent methods to counter Kurdish militants. After a high-profile Turkish Delegation visited Damascus in 1992, the Syrian Government seemed to have ordered the closure of the PKK camp in the Bekaa valley and told the PKK to keep a low profile for some time.

In March 1993 Öcalan, in presence of PUK leader Jalal Talabani declared a unilateral ceasefire for a month in order to facilitate peace negotiations with Turkey. At an other press conference which took place on 16 April 1993 in Bar Elias, Lebanon, the ceasefire was prolonged indefinitely. To this event, the Kurdish politicians Jamal Talabani, Ahmet Türk from the People's Labor Party (HEP) and also Kemal Burkay also attended and declared their support for the ceasefire. The ceasefire ended after the Turkish army killed 13 PKK members in Kulp, Diyarbakir province in May 1993.

The fighting and violence augmented significantly following the presidential elections of June 1993 after which Tansu Çiller was elected prime minister. In December 1995 the PKK announced another unilateral ceasefire to give a new Government an opportunity to articulate a more peaceful approach towards the conflict. The government elected in December 1995 did not initiate negotiations and kept on evacuating Kurdish populated villages. Despite the violent approach of the Government to the ceasefire, it was upheld by the PKK until August 1996. Turkey was involved in serious human rights violations during the 1990s.

From 1996 to 1999, the organization began to use suicide bombers, VBIED, and ambush attacks against military and police bases. The role of suicide bombers, especially female ones were encouraged and mythologised by giving them the status of a "goddess of freedom", and shown as role models for other women after their death. On 30 July 1996, Zeynep Kınacı, a female PKK fighter, carried out the organization's first suicide attack, killing eight soldiers and injuring 29 others. The attacks against civilians, especially Kurdish citizens who refused to cooperate with them, were also reported at the same years. On 20 January 1999, a report published by HRW, stated that the PKK was reported to have been responsible for more than 768 executions. The organization had also reportedly committed 25 massacres, killing more than 300 people. Over a hundred victims were children and women. (Note: Attributed to multiple sources:)

In the late 1980s and early 1990s, in an effort to win increased support from the Kurdish peasantry, the PKK altered its leftist secular ideology to better accommodate and accept Islamic beliefs. The group also abandoned its previous strategy of attacking Kurdish and Turkish civilians who were against them, focusing instead on government and military targets. In its campaign, the organization has been criticized of carrying out atrocities against both Turkish and Kurdish civilians and its actions have been criticised by human rights groups such as Amnesty International and Human Rights Watch. Similar actions of the Turkish state have also been criticized by these same groups. The ECHR has investigated Turkey for executions of Kurdish civilians, torturing, forced displacements and massive arrests. In 1998 Turkey increased the pressure on Syria and ended its support for the PKK. The leader of the organization, Abdullah Öcalan, was captured, prosecuted and sentenced to death, but this was later commuted to life imprisonment as part of the government's seeking European Union membership.

=== 2000s ===
The European Court of Human Rights has condemned Turkey for human rights abuses during the conflict. Some judgements are related to executions of Kurdish civilians, torturing, forced displacements, destroyed villages, arbitrary arrests, murdered and disappeared Kurdish journalists, activists and politicians. As a result of increasing Kurdish population and activism, the Turkish parliament began a controlled process of dismantling some anti-Kurdish legislation, using the term "normalization" or "rapprochement", depending on the sides of the issue. It partially relaxed the bans on broadcasting and publishing in the Kurdish language, although significant barriers remain. At the same time, the PKK was blacklisted in many countries. On 2 April 2004, the Council of the European Union added the PKK to its list of terrorist organizations. Later that year, the US Treasury moved to freeze assets of branches of the organization. The PKK went through a series of changes, and in 2003 it ended the unilateral truce declared when Öcalan was captured.

==== Cease fire 1999–2004 ====
The third phase (1999–2012), after the capture of Öcalan, PKK reorganized itself and new leaders were chosen by its members. The organization made radical changes to survive, such as changing its ideology and setting new goals. During the 7th Party congress in January 2000, the former military wing the Peoples Liberation Army of Kurdistan (Artêşa Rizgariya Gelê Kurdistan – ARGK) was succeeded by the People's Defense Forces (Hêzên Parastina Gel – HPG) and also declared that it wanted to aim for a democratic solution for the conflict. At the same time, the PKK continued to recruit new members and sustain its fighting force.

According to Paul White, in April 2002, the PKK changed its name to the Kurdistan Freedom and Democracy Congress (KADEK) and proclaimed a commitment to nonviolent activities. A PKK/KADEK spokesman stated that its armed wing, the HPG, would not disband or surrender its weapons for reasons of self-defense. This statement by the PKK/KADEK avowing it would not lay down its arms underscores that the organization maintained its capability to carry out armed operations. PKK/KADEK established a new ruling council in April, its membership virtually identical to the PKK's Presidential Council. The PKK/KADEK did not conduct an armed attack in 2002; however, the group periodically issued veiled threats that it will resume violence if the conditions of its imprisoned leader are not improved and its forces are attacked by Turkish military, and it continued its military training like before.

In November 2003, another congress was held which lead to renaming itself as the People's Congress of Kurdistan or Kongra-Gel (KGK). The stated purpose of the organizational change was to leave behind nationalistic and state-building goals, in favor of creating a political structure to work within the existing nation-states. Through further internal conflict during this period, it is reported that 1500 militants left the organization, along with many of the leading reformists, including Nizamettin Taş and Abdullah Öcalan's younger brother Osman Öcalan.

==== Second insurgency 2004–2006 ====
Kongra-Gel called off the cease-fire at the start of June 2004, saying Turkish security forces had refused to respect the truce. Turkish security forces were increasingly involved in clashes with Kurdish separatist fighters. Ankara stated that about 2,000 Kurdish fighters had crossed into Turkey from hideouts in mountainous northern Iraq in early June 2004.

While the fight against the Turkish security forces between 2004 and 2010 continued, the PKK and its ancillary organizations continued to enjoy substantial support among the Kurds of Turkey. In 2005, the original name of the organization PKK was restored, while the Kongra-Gel became the legislature of the Kurdistan Communities Union (KCK). Turkey's struggle against the Kongra-Gel/PKK was marked by increased clashes across Turkey in 2005. In the southeast, Turkish security forces were active in the struggle against the Kongra-Gel/PKK. There were bombings and attempted bombings in resort areas in western Turkey and Istanbul, some of which resulted in civilian casualties. A radical Kurdish separatist group calling itself the Kurdish Freedom Hawks (TAK) claimed responsibility for many of these attacks. The TAK is a rival to PKK that since 2006 repeatedly damaged the PKK's efforts to negotiate cease-fires and unlike the PKK, is seeking to establish independent Kurdistan. In 2006 alone, the PKK claimed over 500 victims. On 1 October 2006, the PKK reportedly declared a unilateral cease-fire that slowed the intensity and pace of its attacks, but attacks continued in response to Turkish security forces significant counterinsurgency operations, especially in the southeast.

==== Cease-fire and renewed conflict ====
On 13 April 2009, the PKK declared a cease fire after the DTP won 99 municipalities and negotiations were spoken about. The AKP first spoke of the "Kurdish Opening", then it was renamed in the "Democratic Opening" to appease nationalist interests and then the "National Unity Project".

On 21 October 2011 Iranian foreign minister Ali Akbar Salehi announced Iran would co-operate with Turkey in some military operations against the PKK.

2012 was the most violent year in the armed conflict between the Turkish State and PKK since 1999. At least 541 individuals lost their lives as a result of the clashes including 316 militants and 282 soldiers. In contrast, 152 individuals lost their lives in 2009 until the Turkish government initiated negotiations with the PKK leadership. The failure of this negotiations contributed to violence that were particularly intensified in 2012. The PKK encouraged by the rising power of the Syrian Kurds increased its attacks in the same year.

During the Syrian Civil War, the Kurds in Syria have established control over their own region with the help of the PKK as well as with support from the Kurdistan Regional Government in Erbil, under President Masoud Barzani.

=== 2010s–2020s ===
==== 2013–2015 peace process ====
In late 2012, the Turkish government began secret talks with Öcalan for a ceasefire. To facilitate talks, government officials transmitted letters between Öcalan in jail to PKK leaders in northern Iraq. On 21 March 2013, a ceasefire was announced. On 25 April, it was announced that the PKK would leave Turkey. Commander Murat Karayılan remarked "As part of ongoing preparations, the withdrawal will begin on May 8, 2013. Our forces will use their right to retaliate in the event of an attack, operation or bombing against our withdrawing guerrilla forces and the withdrawal will immediately stop." The semi-autonomous Kurdish region of Iraq welcomed the idea of refugees from its northern neighbor. The BDP held meetings across the region to state the pending withdrawal to concerned citizens. "The 8th of May is a day we both anticipate and fear," said party leader Pinar Yilmaz. "We don't trust the government at all. Many people here are afraid that once the guerrillas are gone, the Turkish military will crack down on us again."

The withdrawal began as planned with groups of fighters crossing the border from southeastern Turkey to northern Iraq. Iraqi leadership in Baghdad, however, declared that it would not accept armed groups into its territory. "The Iraqi government welcomes any political and peaceful settlement", read an official statement. "[But] it does not accept the entry of armed groups to its territories that can be used to harm Iraq's security and stability." The prospect of armed Kurdish forces in northern Iraq threatens to increase tensions between the region and Baghdad who are already at odds over certain oil producing territory. PKK spokesman Ahmet Deniz sought to ease concerns stating the plan would boost democracy. "The [peace] process is not aimed against anyone," he said "and there is no need for concerns that the struggle will take on another format and pose a threat to others."

It is estimated that between 1,500 and 2,000 PKK fighters resided in Turkey at the time. The withdrawal process was expected to take several months even if Iraq does not intervene to try to stop it. On 14 May 2013, the first groups of 13 male and female fighters entered Iraq's Heror area near the Metina mountain after leaving Turkey. They carried with them Kalashnikov assault rifles, light machine guns and rocket-propelled grenade launchers before a welcoming ceremony.

On 29 July 2013, the PKK issued an ultimatum in saying that the peace deal would fail if reforms were not begun to be implemented within a month. In October, Cemil Bayik warned that unless Turkey resumed the peace process, the PKK would resume operations to defend itself against it. He also criticized Turkey of waging a proxy war against Kurds during the Syrian Civil War by supporting other extremist rebels who were fighting them. As part of the civil war, many PKK fighters laid down arms in Turkey and moved to Syria, facilitating the creation of a progressive Kurdish government in Rojava.

Iraqi Kurdistan President Masoud Barzani backed the initiative saying, alongside Erdogan: "This is a historic visit for me ... We all know it would have been impossible to speak here 15 or 20 years ago. Prime Minister Tayyip Erdogan has taken a very brave step towards peace. I want my Kurdish and Turkish brothers to support the peace process."

==== 2014 action against Islamic State and renewed tensions in Turkey ====
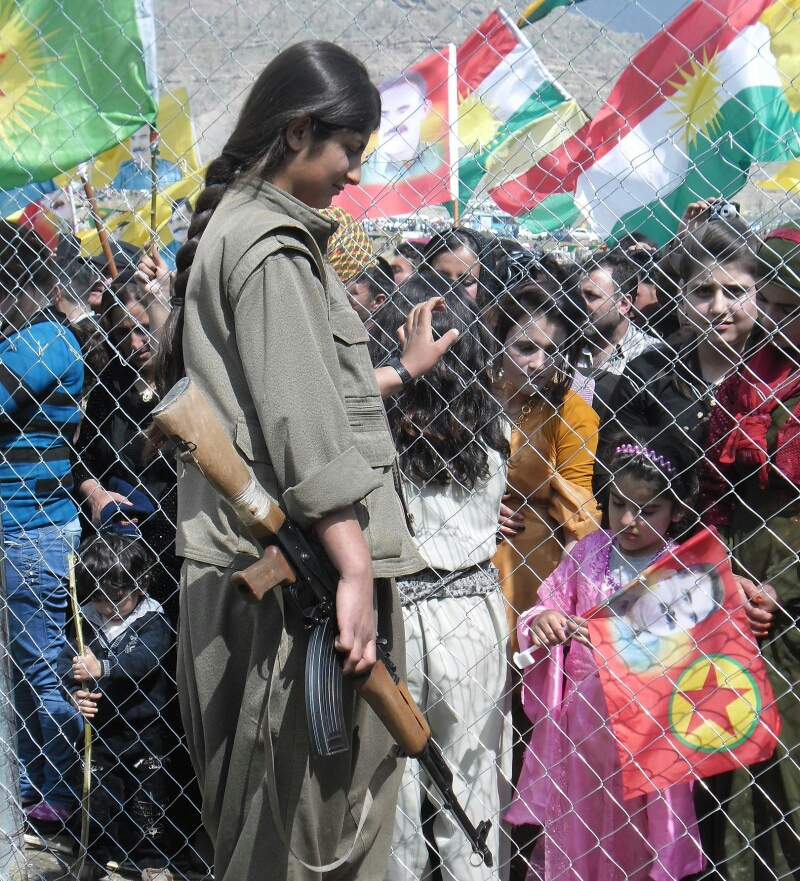
A Kurdish PKK guerrilla in 2014.

The PKK engaged the Islamic State of Iraq and the Levant (ISIL) forces in Syria in mid-July 2014 as part of the Syrian Civil War. In August the PKK engaged IS in Northern Iraq and pressured the Government of Turkey to take a stand against IS. PKK forces helped tens of thousands of Yazidis escape an encircled Mount Sinjar. In September 2014, during the Siege of Kobanî, some PKK fighters engaged with Islamic State forces in Syria who were attacking Kurdish city Kobane, which resulted in conflicts with Turks on the border and an end to a cease-fire that had been in place over a year. The PKK said Turkey was supporting ISIS. The PKK participated in many offensives against ISIS in Iraq and Syria.

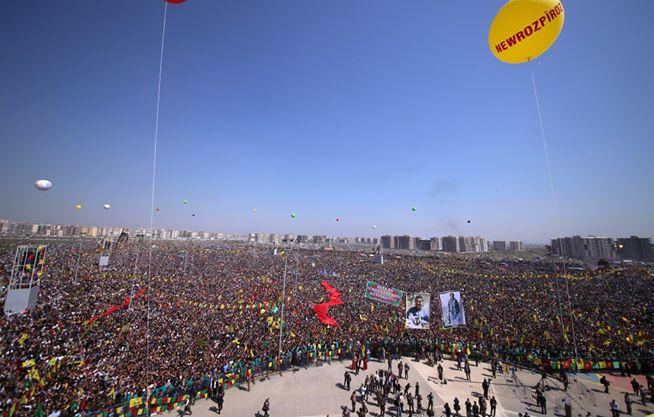
Mass demonstration for the PKK and freedom of Abdullah Öcalan in the Turkish city of Van during Newroz

A number of Turkish Kurds rallied in large-scale street protests, demanding that the government in Ankara take more forceful action to combat IS and to enable Kurdish militants already engaged against IS to more freely move and resupply. These protests included a PKK call for its supporters to turn out. Clashes between police and protesters killed at least 31 people. The Turkish government continued to restrict PKK-associated fighters' movement across its borders, arresting 260 People's Defense Units fighters who were moving back into Turkey. On 14 October, Turkish Air Force fighter-bombers attacked PKK positions in the vicinity of Daglica, Hakkari Province.

Turkish military statements stated that the bombings were in response to PKK attacks on a Turkish military outpost in the area. The Firat news agency, which Al Jazeera describes as "close to the PKK", stated that Turkish forces had been shelling the PKK positions for days beforehand and that the PKK action had itself been retaliation for those artillery strikes. The PKK had already reported several Turkish attacks against their troops months before Turkish bombing started.

==== July 2015 – March 2025: Third insurgency ====
YBS and PKK guerrillas
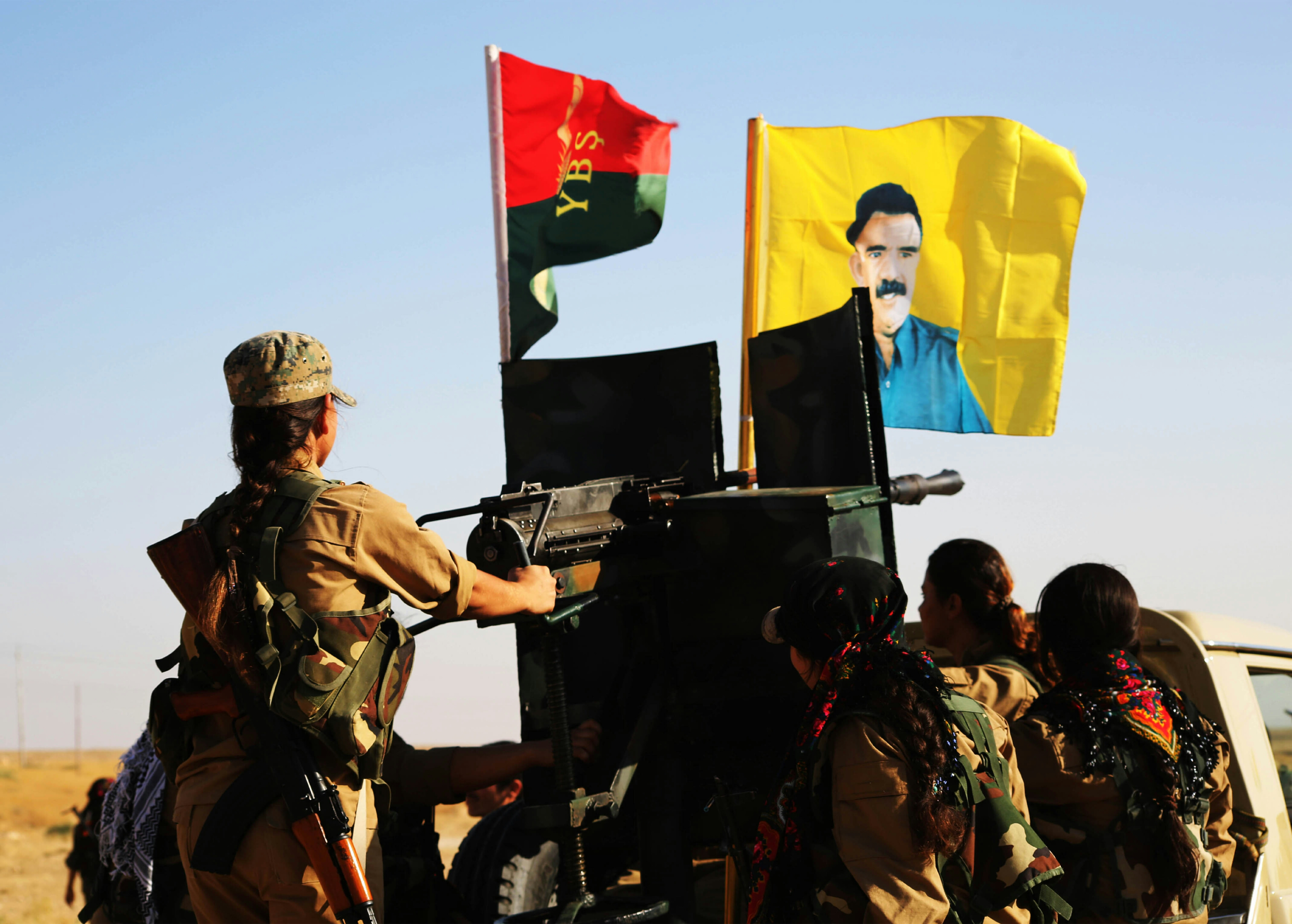
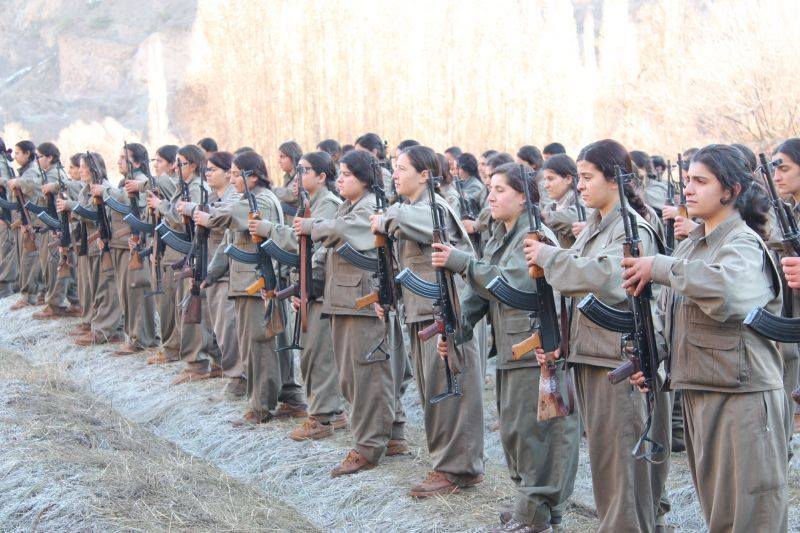
YBŞ and PKK guerillas in Northern and Southern Kurdistan in 2017

In the months before the parliamentary election of 2015, as the "Kurdish-focused" HDP's likelihood of crossing the 10% threshold for entry into the government seemed more likely, Erdogan gave speeches and made comments that repudiated the settlement process and the existence of a Kurdish problem and refusing to recognize the HDP as having any role to play despite their long participation as intermediaries. These announcements increased distrust of the government's good faith among Kurdish leaders. In July 2015, Turkey finally became involved in the war against ISIL. While they were doing so, they decided to bomb PKK targets in Iraq. The bombings came a few days after PKK was suspected of assassinating two Turkish police officers in Ceylanpınar, Şanlıurfa, criticized by the PKK of having links with ISIS after the 2015 Suruç bombing. The PKK has blamed Turkey for breaking the truce by bombing the PKK in 2014 and 2015 continuously.

In August 2015, the PKK announced that they would accept another ceasefire with Turkey only under US guarantees. The leadership of Iraqi Kurdistan has condemned the Turkish airstrikes in its autonomous region in the north of Iraq.

The number of casualties since 23 July was stated by Turkish government to be 150 Turkish officers and over 2,000 Kurdish rebels killed (by September). In December 2015, Turkish military operation in southeastern Turkey has killed hundreds of civilians, displaced hundreds of thousands and caused massive destruction in residential areas.

In March 2016, the PKK helped to launch the Peoples' United Revolutionary Movement with nine other Kurdish and Turkish revolutionary leftist, socialist and communist groups (including the TKP/ML, THKP-C/MLSPB, MKP, TKEP/L, TİKB, DKP, DK and MLKP) with the aim of overthrowing the Turkish government of Recep Tayyip Erdoğan.

In November 2022, an explosion took place on İstiklal Avenue in Istanbul's Beyoğlu district that left at least six people dead and 81 injured. Minister of Interior Süleyman Soylu formally accused the PKK of being behind the attack and announced the arrest of the bomber who had alleged links to the organization and twenty-one others.

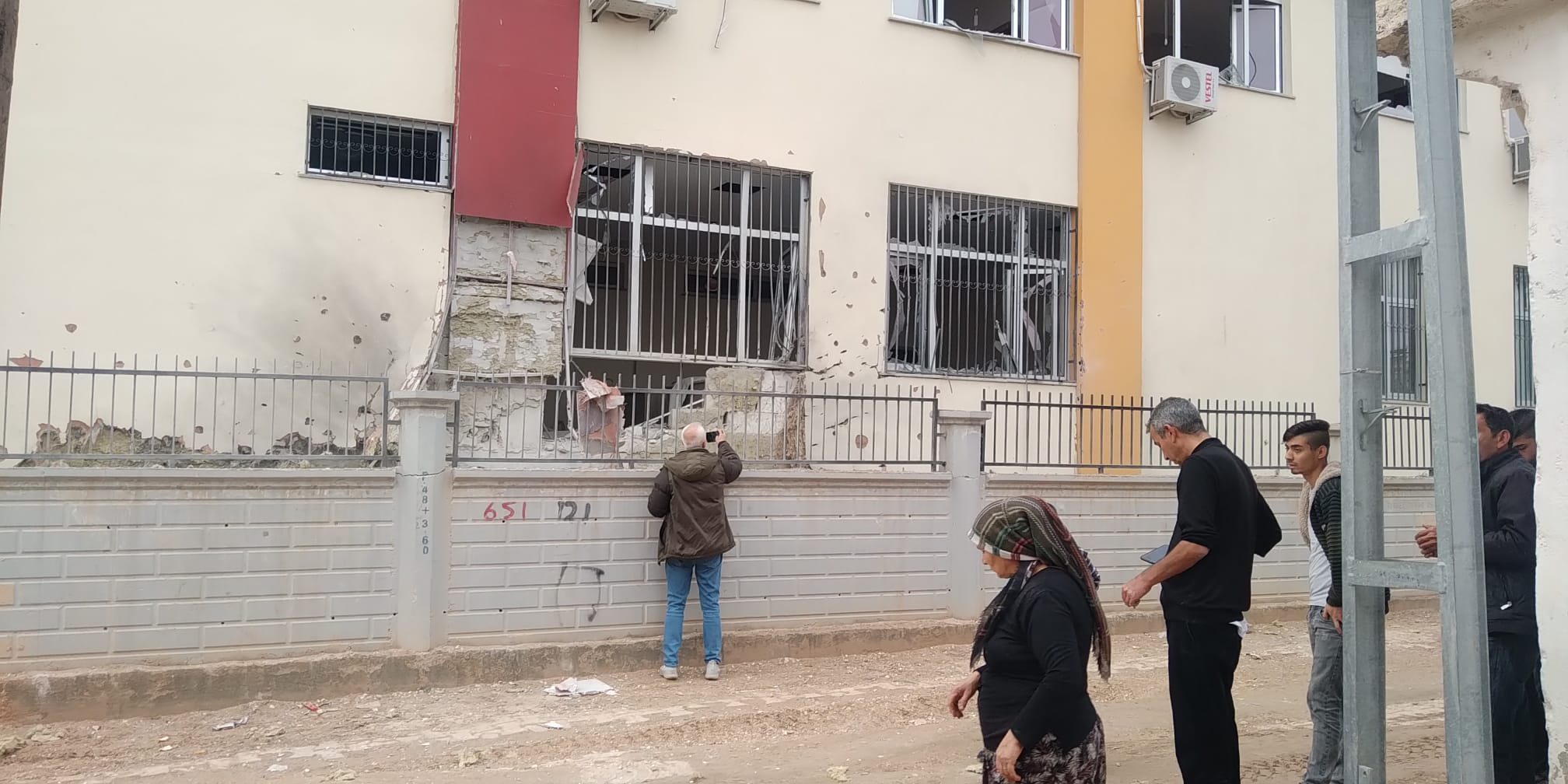
The school after the 2022 Gaziantep attack

On 21 November 2022, at approximately 11:00 TSI, a mortar attack targeted a school, two houses, and a truck in the Karkamış district of Gaziantep. The assault claimed the lives of a 5-year-old boy and a 22-year-old woman, while 6–10 individuals sustained injuries.

In October 2024, the PKK claimed responsibility for a deadly attack on Turkish Aerospace Industries (TUSAŞ) headquarters, resulting in 5 deaths, including four civilians, and 22 injuries. Following this attack, the Turkish air force conducted airstrikes targeting positions of the PKK in northern Syria and Iraq. The Turkish defense ministry reported the destruction of 32 targets during these operations.

In November 2024, British police arrested seven people in London as part of a counter-terrorism investigation linked to the PKK. Searches were carried out at eight locations, including the Kurdish Community Centre, which would be closed for up to two weeks. Authorities assured the public there was no imminent threat and informed the Kurdish community that the operation was aimed at ensuring safety.

==== Disarming and disbanding as part of peace effort ====
In February 2025, PKK leader Abdullah Öcalan urged all members of the group to lay down arms and dissolve the organisation for good. In a statement read out by the deputies of the pro-Kurdish Peoples' Equality and Democracy Party (DEM), Öcalan called on the PKK to convene its congress, lay down its arms and dissolve itself, arguing that the party "has completed its life like its counterparts and necessitated its dissolution". He also called for an alliance between Turks and Kurds and for peaceful coexistence, quoting the positive political approaches of President Recep Tayyip Erdoğan and calls for peace by Nationalist Movement Party Devlet Bahçeli.

Between 5–7 May, the PKK's 12th Party Congress convened. The organisation announced its own dissolution on 12 May 2025. The decision was appreciated by Turkish authorities. President Erdoğan characterised it as "important", stating that they have now "crossed another critical threshold" toward the goal of a terror-free Turkey. Foreign Minister Hakan Fidan described the PKK's self-dissolution as "a historic and important decision", saying that "practical steps will be taken after this".

Disarmament started with a symbolic weapons destruction ceremony in northern Iraq on 11 July 2025.

== Status in Turkey ==
In Turkey, anything which could be perceived as a support of the PKK is deemed unsuitable to be shown to the public. Turkey views the demand for education in Kurdish language or the teaching of the Kurdish language as supporting terrorist activities by the PKK. The fact that both the HDP and the PKK support education in Kurdish language was included in the indictment in the Peoples' Democratic closure case. In January 2016, the Academics for Peace who signed a declaration in support of peace in the Kurdish–Turkish conflict were labelled and prosecuted for "spreading terrorist propaganda" on behalf of the PKK. In November 2020, a playground for children in Istanbul was dismantled after the municipality decided its design too closely resembled the symbol of the PKK. Politicians of pro-Kurdish like the Peace and Democracy Party (BDP) or the HDP were often prosecuted and sentenced to prison term for their alleged support of the PKK. The possession of Devran, a book authored by the political prisoner Selahattin Demirtaş, was viewed as an evidence for a membership in a terrorist organization in 2019 because according to the prosecution it described events involving the PKK.

== Status in Germany ==
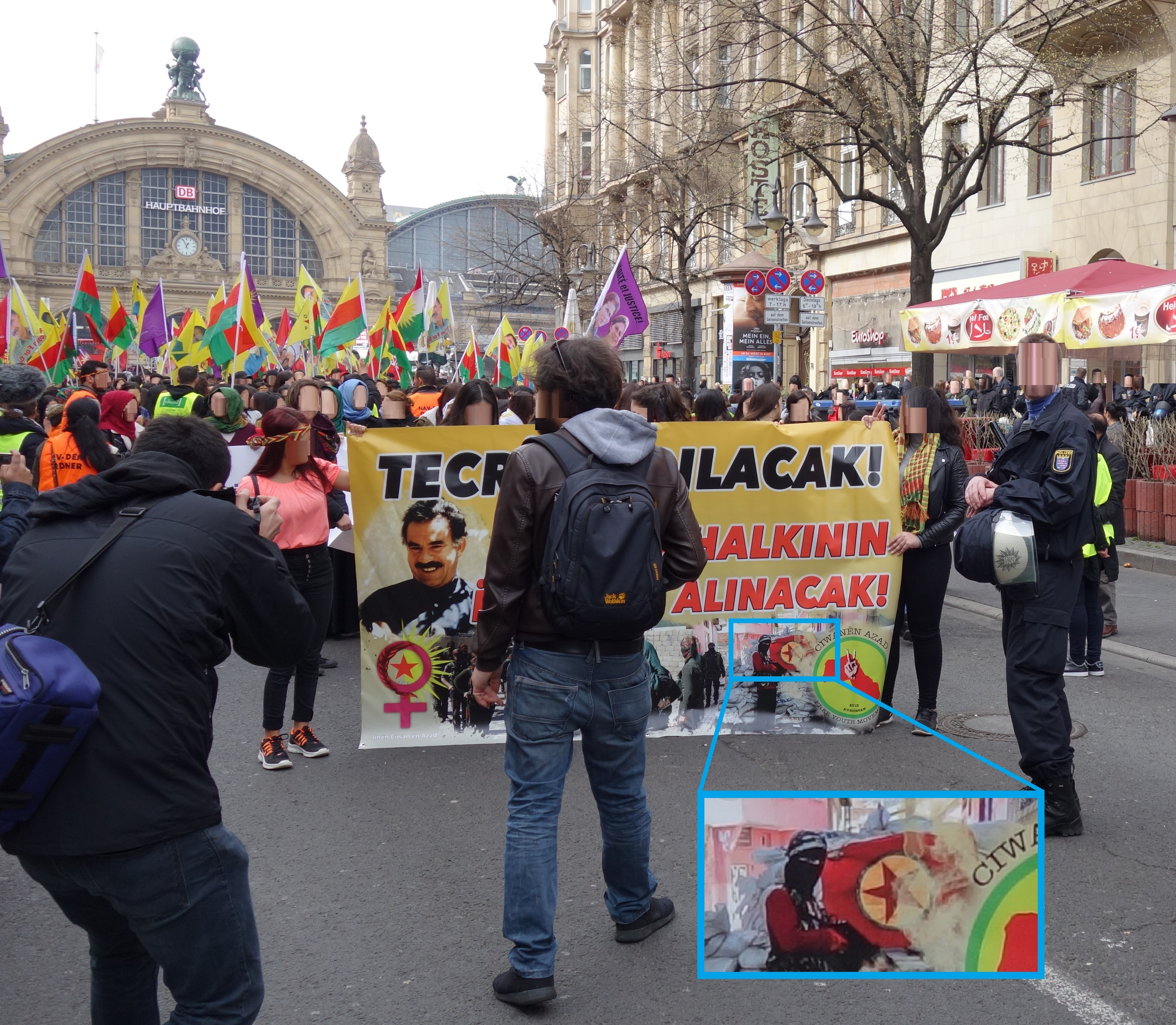
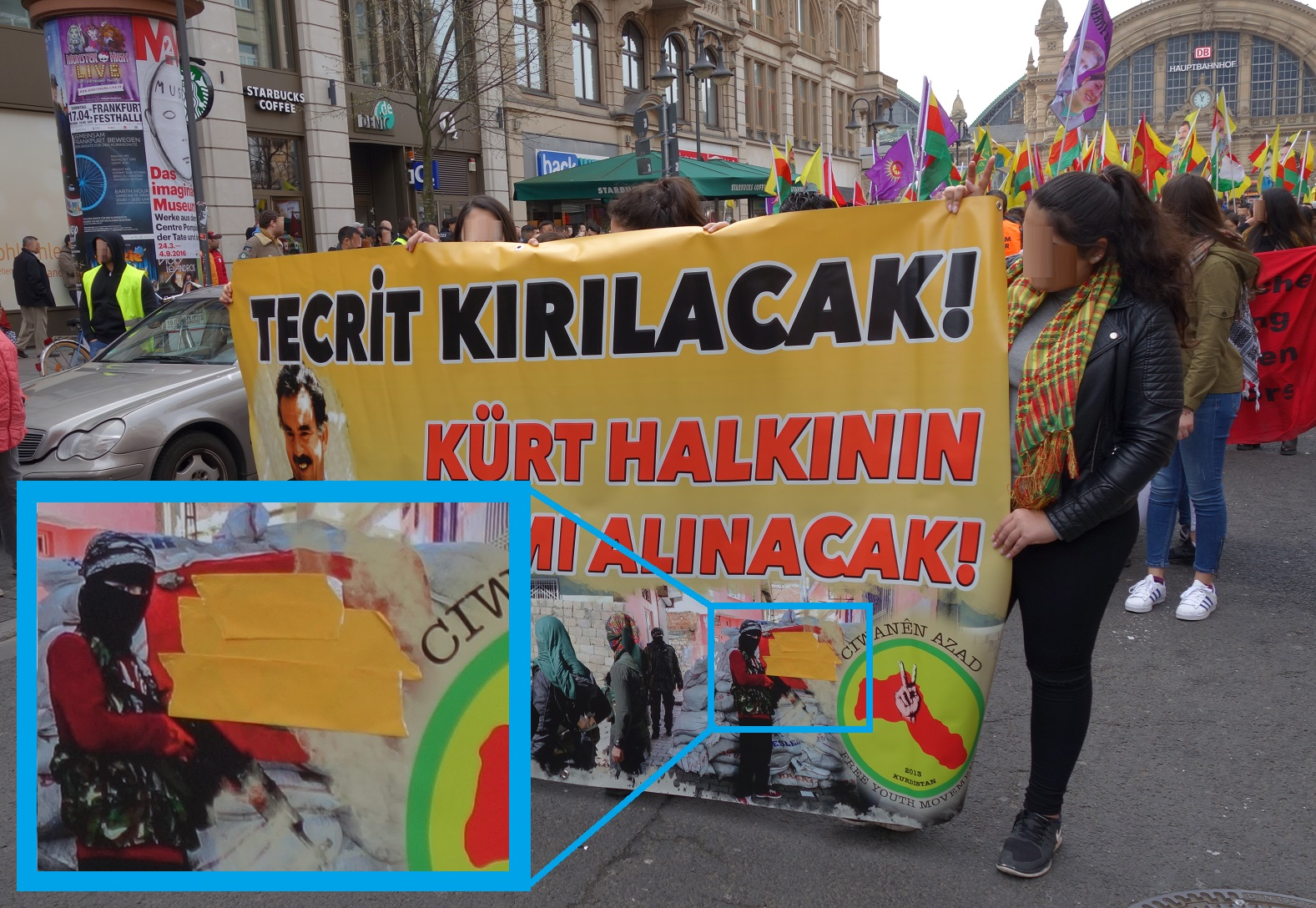
Because the PKK is a designated terrorist organisation in Germany, its symbols cannot be publicly displayed in the country. At a political demonstration in Frankfurt in April 2016, police ordered protesters to cover up the PKK flag.

The PKK could count with a strong support from the diaspora in Germany where the Hunerkom, its cultural branch was based. During the 1990s, the PKK was able to organize blockades of highways and its sympathizers self-immolated for which the PKK official Cemil Bayik apologized in 2015 after sympathizers of the PKK launched several waves of attacks against Turkish institutions in Germany. The PKK's activities were banned by the Minister of the Interior Manfred Kanther in November 1993. In a meeting between German MP Heinrich Lummer of the Christian Democratic Union of Germany (CDU) and Abdullah Öcalan in Damascus in 1996, Öcalan assured Lummer that it was the PKKs aim to find a peaceful solution for their activities in Germany. The PKK also demanded that it should be recognized as a legitimate entity and not as a terrorist organization in Germany, a demand to which Germany did not accede to. In Germany several Kurdish entities such as the Association of Students from Kurdistan (YXK), the Mesopotamia publishing house or the Mir Multimedia music label were deemed to be close to the PKK. The latter two were eventually closed down by Interior Minister Horst Seehofer who accused them of acting as a forefront of the PKK and to support the PKKs activities in Europe with its revenue. The Kurdish satellite channel Roj TV was also accused of being a branch of the PKK by Interior Minister Wolfgang Schäuble and had to end its activities in Germany in 2008. The PKK has received political support for a lift of its prohibition by the Die Linke and its party leader Bernd Riexinger in 2016.ref name=werthschulte/>

== Tactics ==
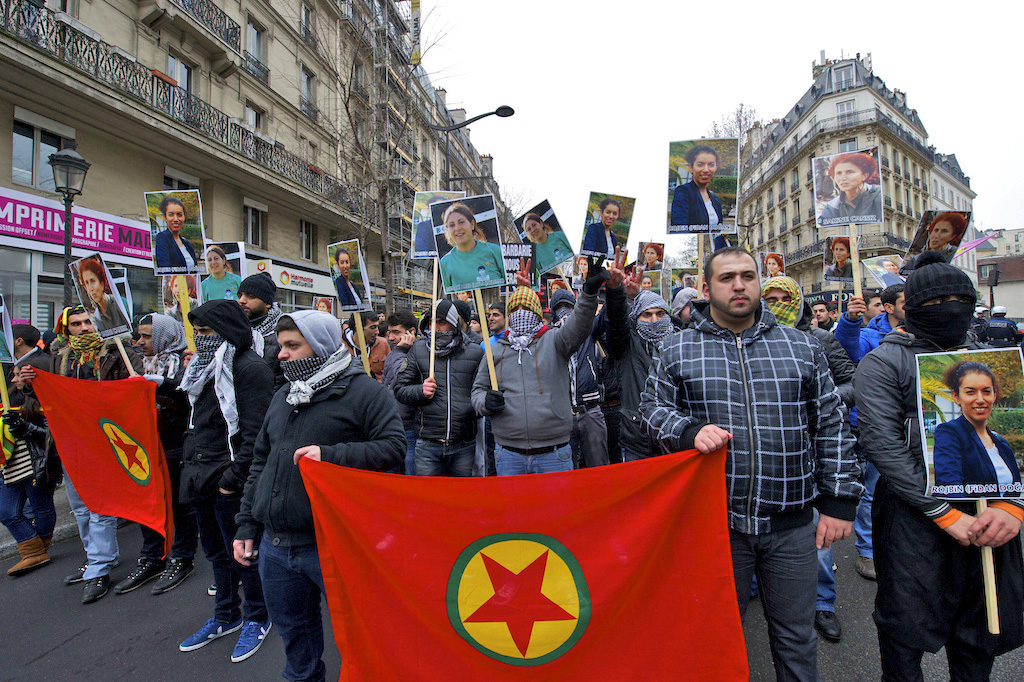
Demonstration in Paris for slain PKK founder and activists

The organization said that its violent actions against the government forces were used by "the need to defend Kurds in the context of what it calls as the massive cultural suppression of Kurdish identity (including the 1983 Turkish Language Act Ban) and cultural rights carried out by other governments of the region". The areas in which the group operates are generally mountainous rural areas and dense urban areas. The mountainous terrain offers an advantage to members of the PKK by allowing them to hide in a network of caves. In 1995 the PKK declared that it would comply with Geneva Conventions of 1949 and also its amendment of 1977. The PKK divides the combat area within Turkey into several regions which comprise a number of Turkish provinces, of which each one is headed by its commander. A province is further also divided into several sub regions, in which a number of fighting battalions of between 100 and 170 militants are stationed. The battalions are again divided into companies of 60 to 70 fighters of which at least one needs to constituted by female and two by male militants.

=== Criticism ===
The PKK has faced condemnation by some countries and human rights organizations for the killing of teachers and civil servants, using suicide bombers, and recruiting child soldiers. According to the TEPAV, an Ankara-based think tank, a survey conducted using data from 1,362 PKK fighters who lost their lives between 2001 and 2011 estimated that 42% of the militants were recruited under 18, with roughly 9% under 15 at the time of recruitment. In 2013 the PKK stated it would prohibit the recruitment of children under the age of 16 as well as keep 16–18 year olds away from combat. Human Rights Watch has documented 29 cases of children being recruited into the HPG (the PKK's armed wing) and the YBŞ since 2013. Some children were recruited under the age of 15, constituting a war crime according to international law.

=== Recruitment ===
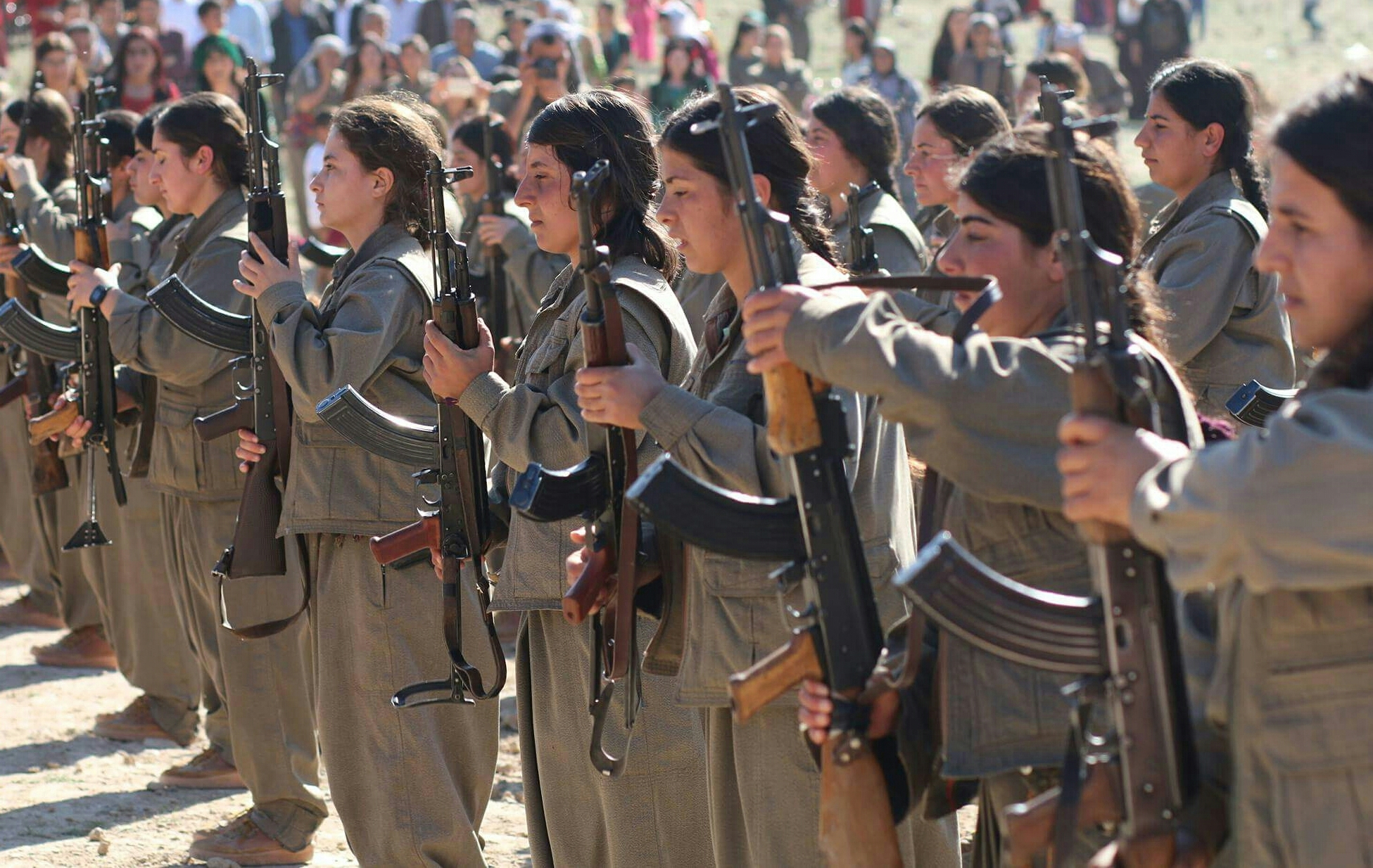
PKK female fighters.

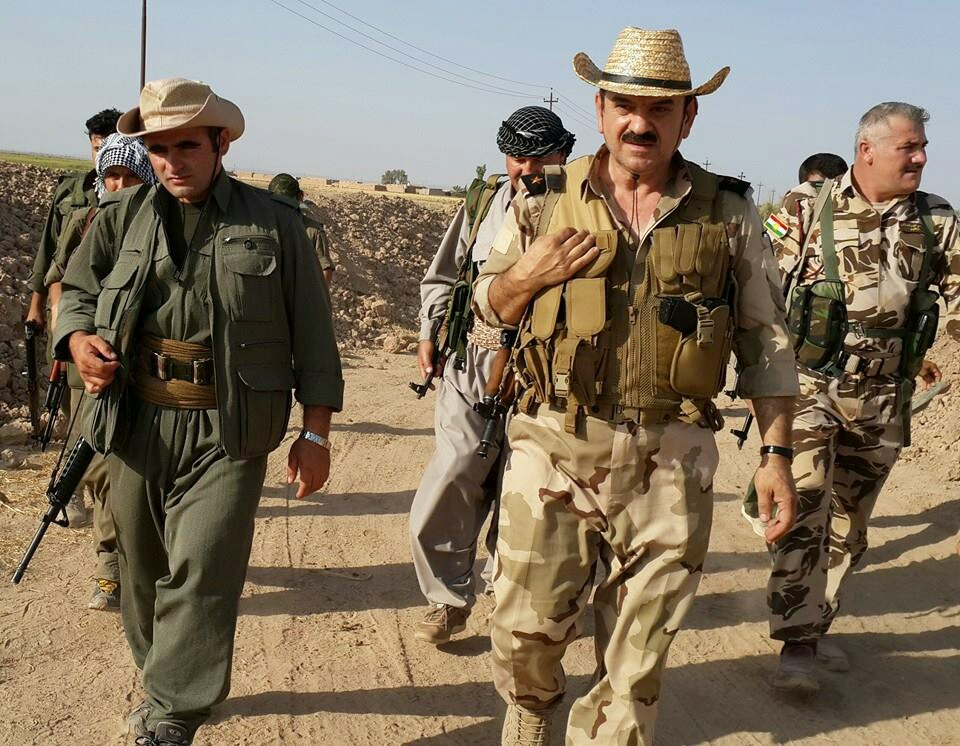
PKK and Peshmerga fighters, 11 August 2015

Since its foundation, the PKK has recruited new fighters mainly from Turkey, but also from Syria, Iraq, Iran, and Western countries using various recruitment methods, such as using nationalist propaganda and its gender equality ideology. At its establishment, it included a small number of female fighters but over time the number increased significantly and by the early 1990s, 30 percent of its 17,000 armed fighting forces were women. After the third party congress in 1986 or in 1989, the PKK's armed wing issued a so-called "Compulsory Military Service Law", which authorized the forcible recruitment of young men. The law provoked disagreement within the party, and in 1990 it was suspended. The PKK has had to temporarily suspend recruitment several times since 1991, as it had difficulties providing training to the large number of volunteers who wanted to join its ranks.

By 2020, 40% of the fighting force were women. In much of rural Turkey, where male-dominated tribal structures, and conservative Muslim norms were commonplace, the organization increased its number of members through the recruitment of women from different social structures and environments, also from families that migrated to several European countries after 1960 as guest workers. It was reported by a Turkish university that 88% of the subjects initially reported that equality was a key objective, and that they joined the organization based on this statement. In 2007, approximately 1,100 of 4,500–5,000 total members were women.

According to the Jamestown Foundation, in the early years of the PKK existence, it recruited young women by abducting them. Families would also encourage family members to join the PKK in order to avenge relatives killed by the Turkish army.

=== Weapons ===
In July 2007, the weapons captured between 1984 and 2007 from the PKK operatives and their origins published by the Turkish General Staff indicates that the operatives erased some of the serial numbers from their weapons. The total number of weapons and the origins for traceable ones were:

The choice and origin of the traceable weapons (July 2007)
Type	Quantity	Sources
AK-47 Kalashnikovs	4,500	71.6% from the USSR, 14.7% from China, 3.6% from Hungary, 3.6% from Bulgaria
Rifles (Note: PKC automatic rifle, Dragunov (SVD-63) sniper rifle, Arbiki, Heckler & Koch G3, M16 rifle, Heckler & Koch PSG1 (G-1), Mauser)	5,713 (959 traceable)	45.2% from Russia, 13.2% from United Kingdom, and 9.4% from United States.
Rocket launchers	1,610 (313 traceable)	85% from Russia, 5.4% from Iraq, and 2.5% from China in origin.
Pistols	2,885 (2,208 traceable)	21.9% from Czechoslovakia, 20.2% from Spain, 19.8% from Italy.
Grenades	3,490 (136 traceable)	72% from Russia, 19.8% from United States, 8% from Germany.
Land mines	11,568 (8,015 traceable)	60.8% from Italy, 28.3% from Russia, 6.2% from Germany.

== Resources ==
=== Funding ===
Parties and concerts are organized by branch groups. According to the European Police Office (EUROPOL), the organization collects money from its members, using labels like 'donations' and 'membership fees' which are seen as a fact extortion and illegal taxation by the authorities. There are also indications that the organization is actively involving in money laundering, illicit drugs and human trafficking, as well as illegal immigration inside and outside the EU for funding and running its activities.

==== Involvement in drug trafficking ====
PKK's involvement in drug trafficking has been documented since the 1990s. A report by Interpol published in 1992 states that the PKK, along with nearly 178 Kurdish organizations were suspected of illegal drug trade involvement. Members of the PKK have been designated narcotics traffickers by the U.S. Department of the Treasury. The Federal Office for the Protection of the Constitution, Germany's domestic security agency, echoed this report in its 2011 Annual Report on the Protection of the Constitution, stating that despite the U.S. Department of Treasury designation, there was "no evidence that the organizational structures of the PKK are directly involved in drug trafficking".

On 14 October 2009, the U.S. Department of the Treasury's Office of Foreign Assets Control (OFAC) targeted the senior leadership of the PKK, designating Murat Karayılan, the head of the PKK, and high-ranking members Ali Riza Altun and Zübeyir Aydar as foreign narcotics traffickers at the request of Turkey. On 20 April 2011, the U.S. Department of the Treasury announced the designation of PKK founders Cemîl Bayik and Duran Kalkan and other high-ranking members as Specially Designated Narcotics Traffickers (SDNT) pursuant to the Foreign Narcotics Kingpin Designation Act (Kingpin Act). Pursuant to the Kingpin Act, the designation freezes any assets the designees may have under U.S. jurisdiction and prohibits U.S. persons from conducting financial or commercial transactions with these individuals. On 1 January 2012, the U.S. Department of the Treasury's Office of Foreign Assets Control (OFAC) announced the designation of Moldovan-based individuals Zeyneddin Geleri, Cerkez Akbulut, and Omer Boztepe as specially designated narcotics traffickers for drug trafficking on behalf of the PKK in Europe. According to the OFAC, Zeynedding Geleri was identified as a high-ranking member of the PKK while two others were activists. The OFAC stated that the drug trafficking is still one of the organization's criminal activities it uses to obtain weapons and materials.

According to research conducted by journalist Aliza Marcus, the PKK accepted the support of smugglers in the region. Aliza Marcus stated that some of those Kurdish smugglers who were involved in the drug trade, either because they truly believed in the PKK—or because they thought it a good business practice (avoid conflicts)—frequently donated money to the PKK rebels. However, according to Aliza Marcus, it does not seem that the PKK, as an organization, directly produced or traded in narcotics.

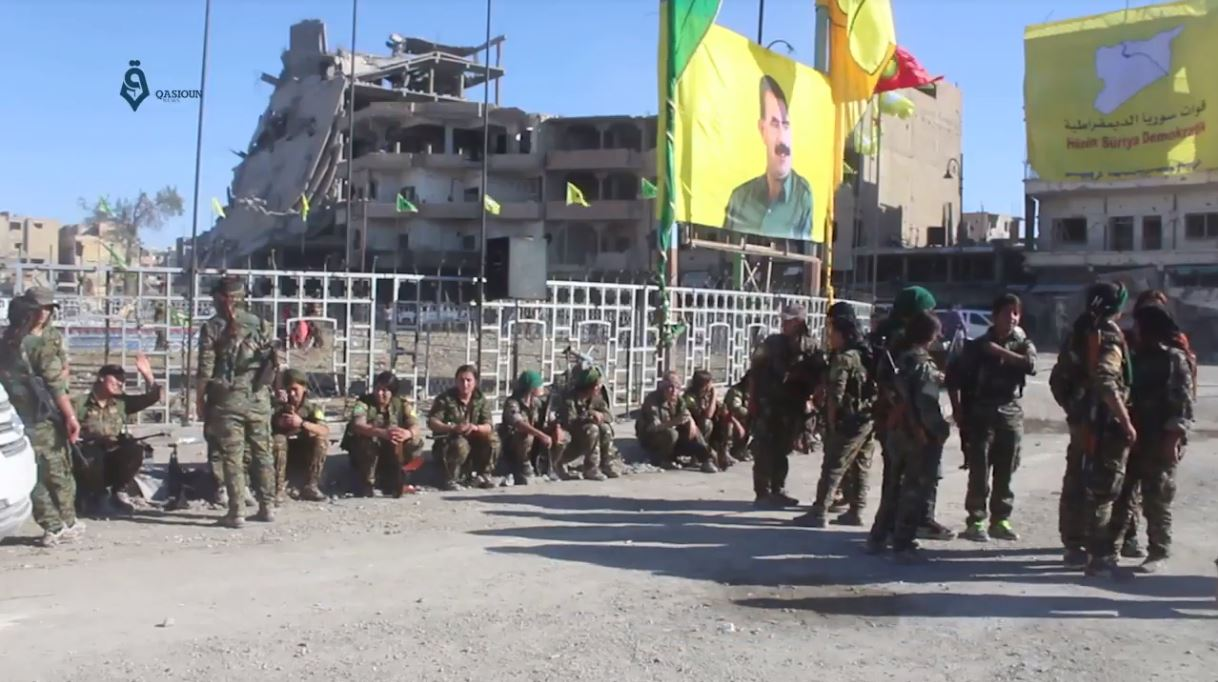
Following the SDF capture of Raqqa, YPJ and YPG troops raised a large banner of Abdullah Öcalan in the city centre.

The EUROPOL which has monitored the organization's activities inside the EU has also claimed the organization's involvement in the trafficking of drugs.

=== Human resources ===
In 2008, according to information provided by the Intelligence Resource Program of the Federation of American Scientists the strength of the organization in terms of human resources consists of approximately 4,000 to 5,000 militants of whom 3,000 to 3,500 are located in northern Iraq. With the new wave of fighting from 2015 onwards, observers said that active support for the PKK had become a "mass phenomenon" in majority ethnic Kurdish cities in the southeast of the Republic of Turkey, with large numbers of local youth joining PKK-affiliated local militant groups.

=== Alleged international support ===
At the height of its campaign, it is alleged that the organization received support from a range of countries. According to Turkey, those countries the PKK previously or currently received support from include: Greece, Cyprus, Iran, Iraq, Russia, Syria, Finland, Sweden and the United States. The level of support given has changed throughout this period. Between the PKK and the Armenian Secret Army for the Liberation of Armenia (ASALA) a cooperation has been agreed on in April 1980 in Sidon, Lebanon.

Greece
According to Ali Külebi, president of an Ankara-based nationalist think tank TUSAM, "It is obvious that the PKK is supported by Greece, considering the PKK's historical development with major support from Greece." Külebi said in 2007 that PKK militants received training at a base in Lavrion, near Athens. Retired Greek L.T. General Dimitris Matafias and retired Greek Navy Admiral Antonis Naxakis had visited the organization's Mahsun Korkmaz base camp in Lebanon's Beqaa Valley in October 1988 along with parliamentarians from the center-left PASOK. At the time it was reported that the general had assumed responsibility for training. Greeks also dispatched arms through the Republic of Cyprus. During his trial, Öcalan admitted, as quoted in Hürriyet, that "Greece has for years supported the PKK movement. They even gave us arms and rockets. Greek officers gave guerrilla training and explosives training to our militants" at a camp in Lavrion, Greece.

Republic of Cyprus
The Republic of Cyprus has been instrumental in helping Greece supply arms to the PKK. Further suspicion of support was stated when Abdullah Öcalan was caught with a diplomatic Cypriot passport issued under the name of Mavros Lazaros, a nationalist reporter.

Syria
From early 1979 to 1999, Syria had provided valuable safe havens to PKK in the region of Beqaa Valley. However, after the undeclared war between Turkey and Syria, Syria placed restrictions on PKK activity on its soil such as not allowing the PKK to establish camps and other facilities for training and shelter or to have commercial activities on its territory. Syria recognized the PKK as a terrorist organization in 1998. Turkey was expecting positive developments in its cooperation with Syria in the long term, but even during the course of 2005, there were PKK operatives of Syrian nationality operating in Turkey.

Iraq
The Ba'athist Iraqi government was accused by the Turkish government and others of supporting the PKK. In December 1992, The Atlantic reported that Saddam Hussein began supporting the PKK after the Gulf War, when his relations with Turkey worsened, and that he seemed likely to continue supporting the PKK as leverage against Turkey, even if he was allowed to return to Iraqi Kurdistan. It was seen as easier for Turkey to work with Iraqi Kurds than the Iraqi government in controlling the PKK, an argument made by Turgut Özal himself. The government of Saddam Hussein was accused of playing a role in PKK activities from 1980 until 2003. Aliza Marcus noted that "the relationship was fairly informal… more so than the PKK's relations with Iran." Saddam Hussein believed the PKK was useful against Turkey and Iraqi Kurds. Although Iraqi support for the PKK officially ended after the 2003 invasion, the PKK remained in the country.

Iran
The relationship of the PKK and the Islamic Republic of Iran was described as "long and strange". During periods of worsening relations with Turkey, the Iranian government had provided various forms of support for the PKK, including funds, weapons, and use of Iranian territory to carry out attacks on Turkey. In turn, PKK had also collaborated with the IRGC in cornering and attacking the KDPI. However, during periods of improved Iranian relations with Turkey, the PKK would allow PJAK (which often refused to cooperate with other Iranian Kurdish groups) to freely attack Iran.
Libya
In the 1990s Abdullah Öcalan appreciated the support for the "Kurdish Cause" by Muammar Gaddafi.

Soviet Union and Russia
Former KGB-FSB officer Alexander Litvinenko said that PKK's leader Abdullah Öcalan was trained by KGB-FSB. As of 2024, Russia is still not among the states that list PKK as a terrorist group despite intense Turkish pressure.

Support of various European states
The Dutch police reportedly raided the 'PKK paramilitary camp' in the Dutch village of Liempde and arrested 29 people in November 2004, but all were soon released.:
Various PKK leaders, including Hidir Yalcin, Riza Altun, Zubeyir Aydar, and Ali Haydar Kaytan all lived in Europe and moved freely. The free movement was achieved by strong ties with influential persons. Danielle Mitterrand, the wife of the former President of France François Mitterrand, had active connections during the 1990s with elements of the organization's leadership that forced a downgrade in relationships between the two states. After harboring Ali Riza Altun, Austria arranged a flight to Iraq for him, a suspected key figure with an Interpol arrest warrant on his name. Turkish foreign minister Abdullah Gül summoned the Austrian ambassador and condemned Austria's action. On 30 September 1995, while Öcalan was in Syria, Damascus initiated contact with high-ranking German CDU MP Heinrich Lummer and German intelligence officials. Sedat Laçiner, of the Turkish think tank ISRO, says that US support of the PKK undermines the US war on terror.

== Designation as a terrorist group ==
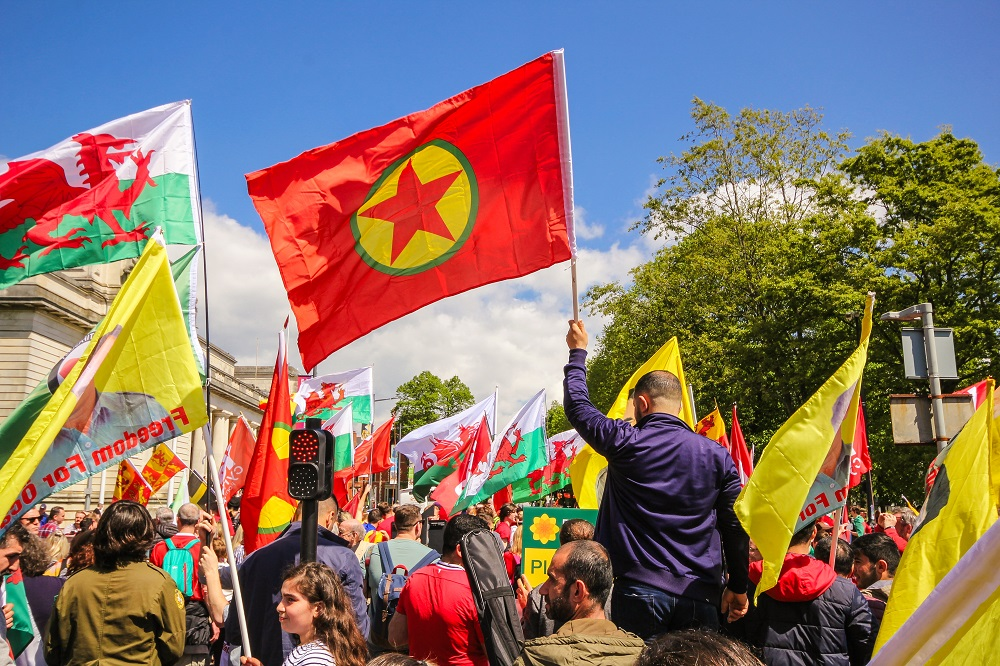
The PKK flag at a march in Cardiff for Welsh independence in May 2019

The PKK has been designated as a terrorist group by a number of governments and organizations. It is often referred as "separatist terrorist organization" (Turkish: Bölücü terör örgütü) by the Turkish authorities.

In the 1980s, the PKK was labeled as a terror organization by the Swedish government of Olof Palme. After Palme was murdered in 1986, the PKK was considered a potential suspect – however, this theory was soon abandoned and in September 2020, the state prosecutor Krister Petersson announced he believed he had found the murderer and closed the case as that person was no longer alive.

In 1994, Germany prohibited the activities of the PKK.

The PKK has been designated as a Foreign Terrorist Organization by the US State Department since 1997. In 2016, US Vice-president Joe Biden called the PKK a terrorist group "plain and simple" and compared it to the Islamic State. In 2018, the United States also offered a $12 million reward for information on three PKK leaders.

First designated as a terror organization by the European Union in 2002, the PKK was ordered to be removed from the EU terror list on 3 April 2008 by the Court of First Instance on the grounds that the EU had failed to give a proper justification for listing it in the first place. However, EU officials dismissed the ruling, stating that the PKK would remain on the list regardless of the legal decision. The EU in 2011 renewed its official listing of the PKK as group or entity subject to "specific [EU] measures to combat terrorism" under its Common Foreign and Security Policy. In 2018, Prakken d'Oliveira Human Rights Lawyers reported that the PKK won another case against its listing as a terror organization by the EU, but the PKK was kept on the list as the ruling only concerned the years from 2014 until 2017.

The PKK is also a Proscribed Organisation in the United Kingdom under the Terrorism Act 2000; the then British Prime Minister Theresa May used the phrase "Kurdish terrorism" in 2018.

France prosecutes Kurdish-French activists and bans organizations connected to the PKK on terrorism-related charges, having listed the group as a terrorist organization since 1993. However, French courts often refuse to extradite captured individuals criticized of PKK connections to Turkey due to technicalities in French law, frustrating Turkish authorities.

The following other countries and organizations have listed or otherwise labelled the PKK in an official capacity as a terrorist organization:

Australia, Austria, Azerbaijan, Canada, Czech Republic, Iran, Japan, Kazakhstan, Kyrgyzstan, New Zealand, Spain, Syria and Iraq.

In May 2022, Finland and Sweden submitted applications to join the NATO alliance as a response to the invasion of Ukraine, Turkey has opposed their admission to the alliance unless they crack down on local PKK, Democratic Union Party (Syria) (PYD) and People's Defense Units (YPG) networks. On 28 June, the first day of the 2022 NATO summit in Madrid, the Turkish delegation softened their opposition to Finland and Sweden's NATO membership applications and signed a tripartite memorandum addressing Turkey's concerns regarding arms exports and Kurdish relations. Finland and Sweden affirmed that the PKK is "a terrorist organization". On 30 June 2022, Turkish President Recep Tayyip Erdoğan said that Sweden made a "promise" to extradite "73 terrorists" wanted by Turkey.

=== Refusal to designate PKK as a terrorist group ===
Russia has long ignored Turkish pressure to ban the PKK. The government of Switzerland has also rejected Turkish demands to blacklist the PKK. Switzerland does not have a list of terrorist organizations, but it has taken its own measures to monitor and restrict the group's activities on Swiss soil, including banning the collection of funds for the group in November 2008.

In 2020, the supreme court of Belgium ruled that the PKK was not a terrorist organization, instead labeling the group as an actor in an internal armed conflict. Following this, the Belgian Government announced that the ruling would not affect the current designation of the PKK as a terrorist organization.

== Flags ==
=== Party flags ===
Flag of the Kurdistan Workers' Party (PKK) (1978–1995)

Flag of the PKK (1995–2000)

- Flag of the PKK (2000–2002)
- Flag of the KADEK (2002–2003)

Flag of the Kongra-Gel (KGK) (since 2003)

Flag of the PKK (since 2005)

=== Flags of wings ===
Flag of the People's Defense Forces (HPG, Formerly HRK and ARGK)

Variant of the flag of the People's Liberation Army of Kurdistan (ARGK), inscribed with the group's acronym (1986–1999)

Flag of the National Liberation Front of Kurdistan (ERNK) (1985–2000)

Former flag of the Free Women's Units of Star (YJA-STAR)

Current flag of the YJA-STAR

== See also ==
- Peshmerga
- List of armed groups in the Syrian Civil War
- Aslı Ceren Aslan

=== Related and associated organizations ===
- Civil Protection Units, Turkey
- Communist Labour Party of Turkey/Leninist
- Communist Party of Turkey/Marxist–Leninist
- Dawronoye – secular, leftist, nationalist movement among the Assyrian people
- Democratic Union Party, Syria
- Devrimci Karargâh, former far-left organization in Turkey
- Êzîdxan Protection Force, Yazidi militia in Syria
- Êzîdxan Women's Units, Yazidi women's militia in Syria
- International Freedom Battalion
- Kurdistan Communities Union
- Kurdistan Democratic Solution Party
- Kurdistan Free Life Party
- Kurdistan Freedom Hawks
- Maoist Communist Party
- Marxist–Leninist Armed Propaganda Unit
- Marxist–Leninist Communist Party
- Marxist–Leninist Party (Communist Reconstruction)
- People's Defense Units
- Peoples' United Revolutionary Movement
- Revolutionary Party of Kurdistan
- Revolutionary People's Party
- Sinjar Alliance
- Sinjar Resistance Units
- United Freedom Forces
- Women's Protection Units
- YDG-H
- YPG International

== Bibliography ==
- Gunter, Michael M. (2018). Historical Dictionary of the Kurds (3 ed.). Lanham, Maryland: Rowman & Littlefield Publishers. doi:10.5040/9798216420385. ISBN 979-8-21642-038-5 – via Bloomsbury.
