= Öcalan =

Öcalan is a Turkish surname. Notable people with the surname include:

- Abdullah Öcalan (born 1949), Kurdish militant leader, one of the founding members of militant organization Kurdistan Workers' Party (PKK)
- Dilek Öcalan (born 1987), Turkish politician, niece of Abdullah Öcalan
- Ömer Öcalan (born 1987), Turkish politician, nephew of Abdullah Öcalan
- Osman Öcalan (1958–2021), Kurdish militant leader, a former leading member of the PKK and younger brother of Abdullah Öcalan
