= Trial of Abdullah Öcalan =

Trial of the leader of the Kurdistan Workers' Party

The trial of Abdullah Öcalan, the leader of the Kurdistan Workers' Party (PKK), began on 31 May 1999 and concluded on 29 June with a death sentence for treason and separatism. Öcalan was captured in February 1999 in Nairobi, Kenya and extradited to Turkey. He was imprisoned on the İmralı island in the Sea of Marmara. After his conviction, Öcalan appealed to the European Court of Human Rights (ECHR), which ruled he did not have a fair trial and demanded a retrial. The death sentence was confirmed by the Court of Cassation in November 1999 and Turkey denied Öcalan a retrial. His death sentence was commuted to life imprisonment in October 2002.

== Background ==
Turkey has issued seven arrest warrants for Abdullah Öcalan, including a red notice with Interpol. Öcalan was the leader of the PKK at the time, which had led an uprising against the Turkish Government demanding more political rights for the Kurdish population in Turkey. Öcalan had lived several of the last twenty years in Syria, which he had to leave on 9 October 1998 due to threats by the Turkish military to invade Syria if he was allowed to stay.

After a short stay in Russia, where he was not granted political asylum by the Russian government, he travelled to Italy. Öcalan landed on 12 November 1998 at the Rome Fiumicino Airport. Upon arriving in Italy, he was arrested on grounds of having entered the country with a false passport and a German arrest warrant. The Turkish government requested the extradition of Öcalan from Italy, where he applied for political asylum upon his arrival. Italy did not extradite him to Germany, which refused to hold a trial for Öcalan, worried that the sympathizers of the PKK could organize in protest or even self-immolate in Germany, just as had happened in Italy and Russia. The German chancellor Gerhard Schröder, as well as the Minister of the Interior Otto Schily, preferred Öcalan to be tried by an unspecified "European Court". Italy refused to extradite Öcalan to Turkey either, and released him from house arrest on 17 December. The Italian prime minister Massimo D'Alema held that it was contrary to Italian law to extradite someone to a country where the defendant is threatened with capital punishment. Human Rights Watch suggested to D'Alema that Öcalan be tried in a European country for the murders of Turkish teachers and Village Guards, which the PKK sees as collaborators or the Turkish authorities. Italian officials didn't want Öcalan to remain in the country, pulling several diplomatic strings to compel him to leave. Italy accomplished this on 16 January 1999 when he departed to Nizhny Novgorod in an attempt to take asylum in Russia.

Öcalan was not as welcomed in Russia as he had been in October, and he had to wait for a week at the airport of Strigino International Airport in Nizhny Novgorod. From Russia, he again traveled to Greece. Greek diplomats sought refuge for him in a North African country, but Öcalan rejected all offers. Öcalan then attempted to travel to The Hague, to pursue a settlement of his legal situation at the International Criminal Court, but the Netherlands wouldn't let his plane land, sending him back to Greece, where he landed on the island Corfu in the Ionean Sea. Öcalan then flew to Nairobi on invitation of Greek diplomats. At that time he was defended by Britta Böhler, a high-profile German attorney who argued that the charges against him had to be proven in court and attempted to reach that the International Court in The Hague would assume the case.

=== Arrest ===
On 15 February 1999, he was captured by a team of the Turkish Intelligence Service (MIT) in Nairobi, as he was on the way to a flight to the Netherlands.

== Pre-trial ==
After his capture he was brought to İmralı island in the Sea of Marmara, on which he was to become the only prisoner. A delegation of three Dutch lawyers who intended to defend him, were not allowed to meet with their client, detained for questioning at the airport on grounds they acted as "PKK militants" and sent back to the Netherlands. In the first week of his detention, over a dozen lawyers sent by Öcalans family were denied the right to see him. Öcalan was interrogated for ten days, without access to his lawyers. A State Security Court consisting of one military and two civilian judges was tasked to try Öcalan. On 21 February, the State Security Court of Ankara gained access to Abdullah Öcalan and its prosecutor began to interrogate him. On the 22 February he acknowledged of being the a founder and leader of the PKK which initially attempted to found an independent state but later focused on achieving better political and cultural rights for Turks and Kurds. The following day, a judge accepted charges of treason and separatism with the prosecution aiming for the death penalty.

On the 25 February, he was allowed to meet with two of his lawyers and after one and a half month he was able to see members of his family. Öcalan's lawyers questioned the fact that Öcalan was kept in detention under control of the General Staff and the Turkish special forces instead under the authority of the Ministry of Justice as according to Turkish law it should be. During the interrogation he admitted to have employed some terrorist methods but also argued that if one would view it in context of the historical record of Turkey, it was clear Turkey employed many more terrorist methods.

Between the 11 March and the 22 April Öcalan's lawyers were permitted to see their client for twelve meetings of a duration of about one hour. On the 18 March his lawyers released a statement of their client in which he reasoned he would base his defense on the several cease-fires the PKK declared since the cease fire in 1993. He had several cases open against him like one for participating in an interview of Med TV, in which he was prosecuted under Art. 125 of the Turkish Penal Code. Two other cases were joined with the latter and the trial was set to take place in Ankara without the defendant. On the 7 May, the lawyers of the defense were granted access to the case file of reportedly about seventeen-thousand pages but not provided with a copy of it. The lawyers of the defense then used their own photocopier and needed until the 15 May until having copied the file by themselves.

=== Hearings in Ankara ===
On 24 March 1999, the first hearing took place in Ankara. The Security Court determined the trial to take place on İmralı island despite the lawyers of the defense objections to the existing restrictions on meeting their client on the island. On the 30 April the prosecutor issued a separate indictment which included all charges regarding the armed warfare of the PKK demanding a capital punishment for separatism and the court ordered the trial to begin on 31 May 1999. The same day, the lawyers of Abdullah Öcalan were severely attacked by a mob and had to be treated in hospital. Ahmet Zeki Okcukoğlu, the head of Öcalan defense team demanded observers for protection, else they would quit. In the two hearings on the 24 March and the 30 April in Ankara, Öcalan did not take part in, with the Turkish Government arguing it was for security reasons.

== Main trial on İmralı island ==
The trial on İmralı island was held between the 31 May 1999 and the 29 June 1999 and judges from the State Security Court of Ankara were chosen to hear the case. Tight security measures were taken. For this trial a new courtroom was built and Öcalan attended the trial in a bullet-proof glass case. The island was placed within a military security zone. Helicopters and warships maintained a security cordon around the island and people who wanted to enter Mudanya on Turkey mainland (where the port for the boats to İmralı island is located), had to pass an identity check at the entrance of the town. After Öcalan arrived on the island, many media organizations established a presence in the town of Mudanya, but the two sole media organizations provided with unrestricted access to the trial were Anadolu and TRT from the Turkish Republic. The other media present at the scene, both Turkish and International were only permitted to report on the proceedings after the end of each session. The lawyers of the defense were to take a boat from Mudanya every day while the prosecutors lodged on the island. Relatives of Turkish soldiers and victims of the Turkish-Kurdish conflict were permitted to be plaintiffs in the trial and take part in its hearings represented by lawyers. Turkish disabled military personnel were also witnesses to the trial.

=== Trial ===
The first day was marked with the call for an end of the armed conflict and a peaceful solution to the Kurdish issue in Turkey by Abdullah Öcalan, as well as the withdrawal of the head of Öcalan's defense team, Ahmet Zeki Okcukoğlu who alleged his client rights to a fair trial were violated and that he did not want the death of Öcalan on his conscience. Further on the lawyers of the defense demanded a delay of the proceedings due to their obstructed defense, a demand which was dismissed by the court.

The second day, Öcalan assumed the main responsibility for the armed struggle of the PKK against the Turkish military. But he denied having ordered the murders of the Swedish prime minister Olof Palme and of thirty three unarmed members of the Turkish army in 1993, and deferred an eventual responsibility of those deaths to renegade members of the PKK.

On the third day of the trial, a judge was moved to tears as he heard the accounts by a widow of a Turkish soldier. Following the witnesses account, several of the Turkish soldiers relatives in the courtroom shouted "execute him". The presiding judge Turgut Okyay demanded that the lawyers prepare for their final statements for the trial the next day.

On the 3 June the lawyers of the defense did not attend as they were banned from staying from any hotel near the İmralı island and therefore boycotted the trial.

On the 4 June, the defense team requested that Tansu Çiller and Jalal Talabani, as well as relatives of Kurdish militants could have a stand in court, a demand which was denied by the judges and met with fierce resistance by the relatives of Turkish soldiers sitting in the courtroom. Soldiers had to step in and protect the lawyers of the defense from angry spectators to trial. The trial was adjourned until next week due this confrontation. As the trial paused for a few days, lawyers representing the relatives of Turkish soldiers, attempted to file lawsuits against Öcalan's lawyers alleging they supported the PKK by accusing Turkey for also being responsible for the deaths in the Turkish-Kurdish conflict. As the trial resumed, the prosecution again demanded the execution of Abdullah Öcalan while the court adjourned the trial for another fifteen days.

On 18 June 1999 the Grand National Assembly of Turkey voted to remove military judges from the State Security Courts in an attempt to address criticism from the European Court of Human Rights. After the Turkish Constitution was adapted accordingly, a civilian judge who had observed the trial as a substitute, replaced the military judge. As the trial resumed on 23 June, the lawyers demanded a suspension of trial due to the new composition of the court, a request which was denied.

==== Arguments by the prosecution ====
The prosecution held Öcalan responsible for the deaths during the Kurdish Turkish conflict. Further it alleged that Öcalan had accepted his responsibility as the leader and founder of the PKK. It argued that there was no Turkish-Kurdish enmity as Öcalan claimed, nor that Turkey oppressed or denied the Kurds, except in the case of Kurdish rebellions which were subdued successfully. It further accused the PKK of specifically targeting the pro-Government Village Guards which were recruited of Kurds. The prosecution demanded the death sentence according to Art. 125.

==== Arguments by the defense ====
The lawyers of Abdullah Öcalan claimed Öcalan personally did not participate in any terrorist activities and wanted him to be sentenced to not more than 30 years in prison for forming an armed gang according to Art. 168/1. Öcalan himself did not focus much on a legal defense but on a political one, assumed responsibility for his actions and demanded his inclusion in an eventual peace process for the Kurdish-Turkish conflict. He admitted that he was influenced by the findings on self-determination, independence and autonomy from Leslie Lipson and that at the time of the trial saw himself more influenced by the democracies experienced in the United States and the United Kingdom which he saw the victorious powers in the struggle with communism. In his final statement, Öcalan encouraged Turkey to take a more constructive approach to the conflict like allowing broadcasts and education in Kurdish language.

=== Sentence ===
On the 29 June 1999, Öcalan was sentenced to death according to Art. 125 of the Turkish Penal Code and banned from holding public office for life. His personal belongings of which he was dispossessed, namely a Rayban sunglasses, a Zenith watch, a tie and a leather belt were ordered to be returned. The sentence was read out by the Judge Turgut Okyay and broadcast live on TRT. The 29 of June is the anniversary of the hanging of Sheikh Said, the leader of a Kurdish rebellion in 1925.

=== Appeal before the Court of Cassation in Turkey ===
By October 1999, Öcalans lawyers appealed before the Court of Cassation, demanding the commutation of the death sentence, arguing their client should have been tried by a different article of the Turkish Penal Code, with which the death penalty would not be able to be applied. The Court of Cassation confirmed the death sentence on 25 November 1999.

=== Commutation of the sentence ===
Upon the abolition of the death penalty in Turkey in August 2002, in October of the same year the security court commuted his death sentence to life imprisonment.

== Reactions to the death sentence ==
=== International ===
On the same day, Amnesty International demanded a re-trial and in August 1999 published a special issue on the trial called "Death sentence after unfair trial" showing the trial’s deficiencies. Also in June 1999, Human Rights Watch (HRW) questioned the fact that witnesses brought by the defense were not heard in trial while Asma Jahangir the UN Special Rapporteur on extrajudicial, summary and arbitrary executions, stated that the verdict of a death sentence after a trial in which the fair standards were not respected violated the rights of life.

=== Domestic ===
In early July 1999, the Turkish Parliament discussed a so-called Repentance Bill which would commute Öcalans death sentence to a 20-year imprisonment and allow PKK militants to surrender with a limited amnesty, but it didn't pass due to resistance from the far-right around the Nationalist Movement Party (MHP). Following the confirmation of the death sentence on the 25 November 1999, crowds marched towards the Turkish Parliament demanding their approval of the death sentence, which is necessary according to Turkish law. Several protests in support of the death sentence were organized during which puppets of Öcalan were hung in front of cameras and on one occasion, a disabled veteran hurled a prosthetic leg towards the prime minister. In January 2000 the Turkish government declared the death sentence was delayed until European Court of Human Rights (ECHR) reviewed the verdict and in 2002 the death penalty was commuted to an aggravated life sentence.

== Appeal before the European Court of Human Rights ==
In an attempt to reach a more favorable verdict, Öcalan appealed to the ECHR at Strasbourg, which accepted the case in November 2000. He was represented by a team headed by Hasip Kaplan, while Francis Szpiner lead the lawyers of the Turkish Government. Sydney Kentridge, Gareth Peirce and Aysel Tuğluk were also among the lawyers who represented Öcalan. In March 2003, the ECHR delivered a verdict stating that Öcalan was not tried by an independent and impartial court but dismissing claims that his detention conditions were inhumane or that his detention in Kenya violated his rights. Following an appeal, the Grand Chamber of the ECHR presided by Luzius Wildhaber, ruled that Turkey had violated articles 3, 5, and 6 of the European Convention of Human Rights by refusing to allow Öcalan to appeal his arrest and by sentencing him to death without a fair trial in 2005. On his detention in Kenya by Turkish authorities, Öcalan reasoned Article 5 was violated since Turkey did not possess jurisdiction in Kenya, nor was he able to challenge his extradition. He also did not accept being seen as a terrorist, that his extradition was a lawful cooperation between two states in their fight against terrorism, nor that the way he was brought to Turkey was in accordance with Article 3. The court found that in lack of jurisdiction no rights were violated during his detention in Kenya since a Kenyan police officer drove Öcalan towards the Turkish airplane and Kenyan and Turkish authorities appeared to have cooperated without having an extradition treaty in place. Regarding the involvement of a military judge in the trial which was defended by Turkey as a civilian judge has eventually replaced the military before the sentence was delivered, the ECHR maintained that the court sentencing Öcalan should have been independent at all times and it did not matter on what stage of the trial the military judge was replaced. Following the ECHR ruling, Öcalan requested a retrial in Turkey in 2006, which was refused by Turkish courts in 2007 on grounds that a retrial would not alter the verdict. The Turkish Government alleged that the Council of Europe's deputy ministers agreed that Turkey had sufficiently satisfied the demands of the ECHR ruling. This decision was defended by the Turkish Justice Minister Sadullah Ergin again in March 2013.

== Aftermath ==
In November 2011, 46 lawyers who had represented Öcalan were detained. In 2013 they were put on trial in Turkey, accused of being part of a "leadership committee" headed by Öcalan. Their prolonged pre-trial detention was due to frequent adjournments. British barrister Margaret Owen described this "purely political trial" as "Kafkaesque". Examples of the evidence against Öcalan's lawyers the prosecution provided are owning a book by Abdullah Öcalan and illegally wiretapped telephone conversations which included mentions of Öcalan or İmralı, the name of the island on which Öcalan is imprisoned. Other evidences included photographs depicting a defendant walking near an Internet café. During the deliberations the defendants also quoted Aristotle and William Shakespeare.
