= Dilek Öcalan =

Kurdish politician in Turkey

Dilek Öcalan MP
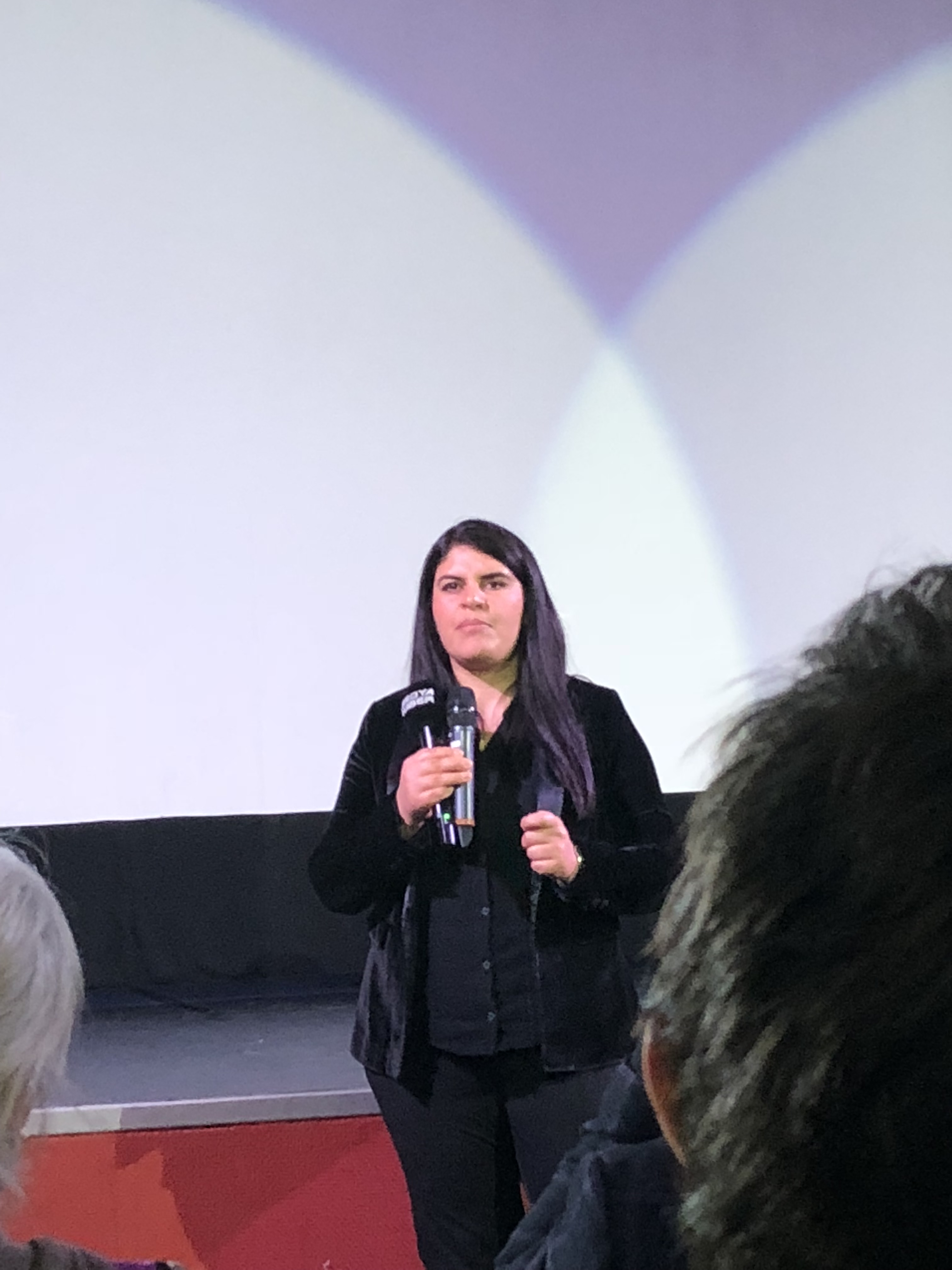

Member of the Grand National Assembly
- In office 23 June 2015 – 16 May 2018
- Constituency: Şanlıurfa (June 2015, Nov 2015)

Personal details
- Born: 3 October 1987 (age 38) Halfeti, Şanlıurfa, Turkey
- Citizenship: Turkey
- Party: Peoples' Democratic Party (HDP)
- Other political affiliations: Democratic Regions Party (DBP)
- Relatives: Abdullah Öcalan (uncle); Osman Öcalan (uncle); Ömer Öcalan (cousin)
- Occupation: Politician

Dilek Öcalan (born 3 October 1987) is a Kurdish politician of the Peoples' Democratic Party (HDP) who served as a Member of Parliament for the electoral district of Şanlıurfa, Turkey, from 2015 to 2018. She is the niece of Abdullah Öcalan, the imprisoned leader of the Kurdistan Workers' Party (PKK) militant organisation that has been in conflict with the Turkish Armed Forces since the 1980s, making both her candidacy and election to the Grand National Assembly controversial.

== Early life ==
Öcalan was born on 3 October 1987 in Halfeti, Sanlıurfa, as daughter of Fatma Öcalan, the sister of imprisoned PKK leader Abdullah Öcalan. She has a tourism degree from university. On 23 December 2013, she visited her uncle at İmralı prison and became known to the media after she gave a press statement detailing the conversation between them. Öcalan has been imprisoned since 1999, serving a sentence of aggravated life imprisonment under charges of founding and leading Kurdistan Workers' Party

== Political career ==
Öcalan first entered politics in 2012, a year before meeting her uncle on the Island of İmralı. During the third congress of the pro-Kurdish Peace and Democracy Party (BDP), she was elected to the party executive while the party changed its name to Democratic Regions Party (DBP) and adopted a fraternal relationship with the Peoples' Democratic Party (HDP).

=== Member of Parliament ===
Öcalan's candidacy to become a Member of Parliament despite being the niece of Abdullah Öcalan was heavily controversial, drawing strong opposition from Turkish nationalists. Her candidacy also allegedly caused a split within the Öcalan family. Nevertheless, she was put forward as a HDP candidate for the electoral district of Şanlıurfa, being fielded as the second candidate on the HDP's provincial party list. She was subsequently elected in the June 2015 general election to become one of the youngest MPs in the new Parliament, resulting in her being appointed to the temporary Speaker's Council until a new Council could be elected in July. In the snap elections in November 2015 Öcalan was reelected as an MP.

== Prosecution ==
On 1 February 2017 an arrest warrant was issued for Öcalan. She was detained on 7 February, and released the same day, after which she left Turkey and went into exile. On 1 March 2018 she was sentenced to two years and six months in prison for spreading terror propaganda during a speech she held at a funeral.

== See also ==
- Kurdish nationalism
