= Okyay =

Okyay is a Turkish name and surname. Notable people with the surname include:

- Ibrahim Okyay (born 1969), Turkish auto racing driver
- Kemal Okyay (born 1985), Turkish footballer
- Sevin Okyay (born 1942), Turkish literary critic, journalist, and author
- Turgut Okyay (born 1941), Turkish judge and politician
