= Halfeti =

- District and municipality
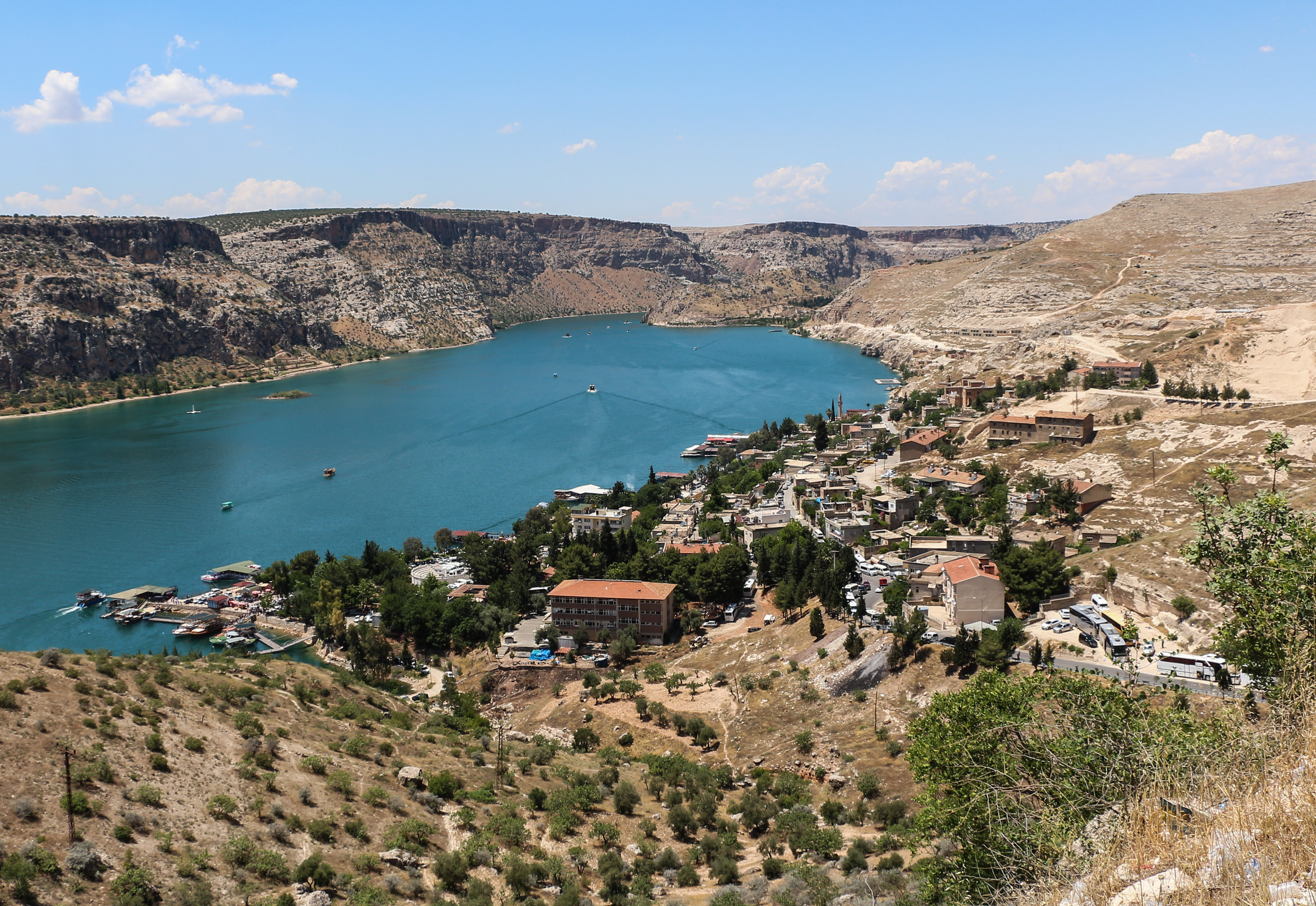
- Old Halfeti and the river Euphrates

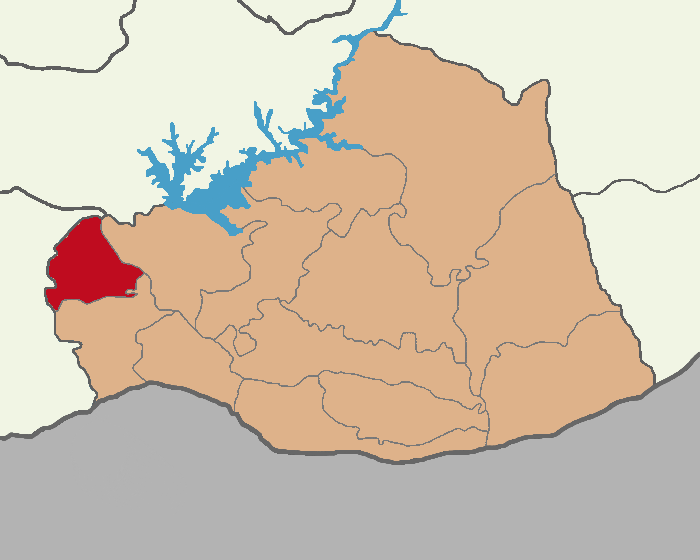
- Map showing Halfeti District in Şanlıurfa Province

- Location within Turkey Location within Şanlıurfa
- Coordinates: 37°13′44″N 37°56′45″E
- Country: Turkey
- Province: Şanlıurfa

Government
  - Mayor: Hakan Başoğlu (State Appointment)
- Area: 609 km^{2} (235 sq mi)
- Population (2022): 41,662
  - Density: 68.4/km^{2} (177/sq mi)
- Time zone: UTC+3 (TRT)
- Area code: 0414
- Website: www.halfeti.bel.tr

Halfeti (Kurdish: Xelfêtî) is a municipality and district of Şanlıurfa Province, Turkey. Its area is 609 km^{2}, and its population is 41,662 (2022). It is near the east bank of the river Euphrates, 120 km (75 miles) from the city of Şanlıurfa.

Most of the villages were submerged in the 1990s under the waters behind the dam on the Euphrates at Birecik. The town was therefore moved to the village of Karaotlak.

Halfeti was the subject of an internet urban legend wherein the town was the only location on Earth where black roses grew.

== Post-dam settlement ==
As part of the Southeastern Anatolia Project, aka GAP, several dams were constructed in the area and surrounding regions as part of a larger agricultural and economic initiative by the Turkish Government. The town of Halfeti was among those settlements, ancient and contemporary, that would remain under the rising water levels of the local dams and rivers following the execution of the GAP.

Until the area was flooded in 1999, the people lived from fishing in the Euphrates and farming on the riverbank, especially growing pistachios. Some buildings, including the jail, were pulled down and rebuilt in the new town. The old town of Halfeti is only partially submerged and is now a local tourist attraction, especially for ferry trips to visit the ruins of the nearby fortress of Rumkale. The countryside is also attractive, although the green valley of the past is now underwater.

Opposite Halfeti stood the village of Kale Meydanı, which was also submerged, but the large landowners house was taken and reconstructed in the grounds of Harran University.

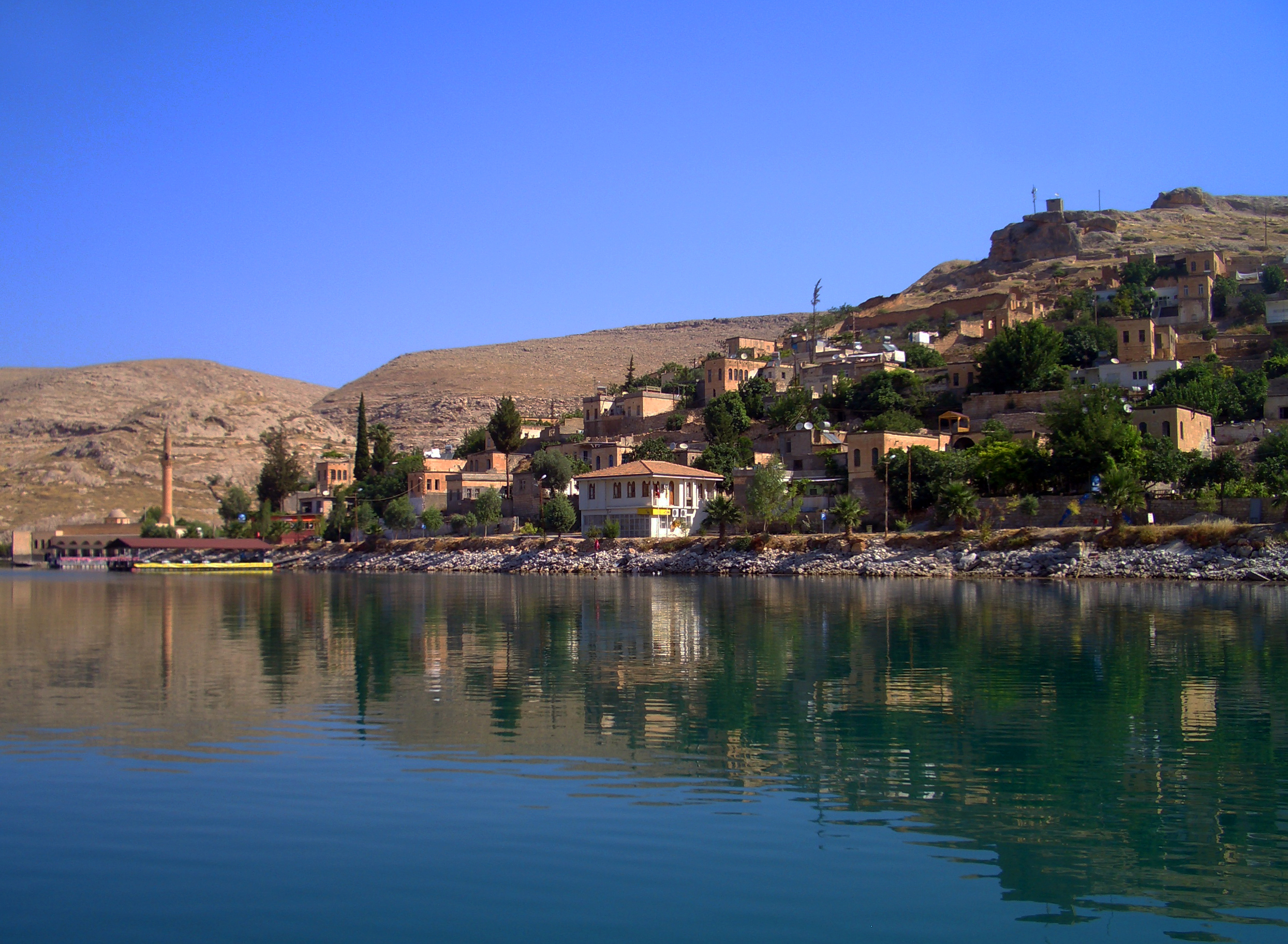
The town of Eski Halfeti (Old Halfeti), partially submerged by the rising waters of the Birecik Dam

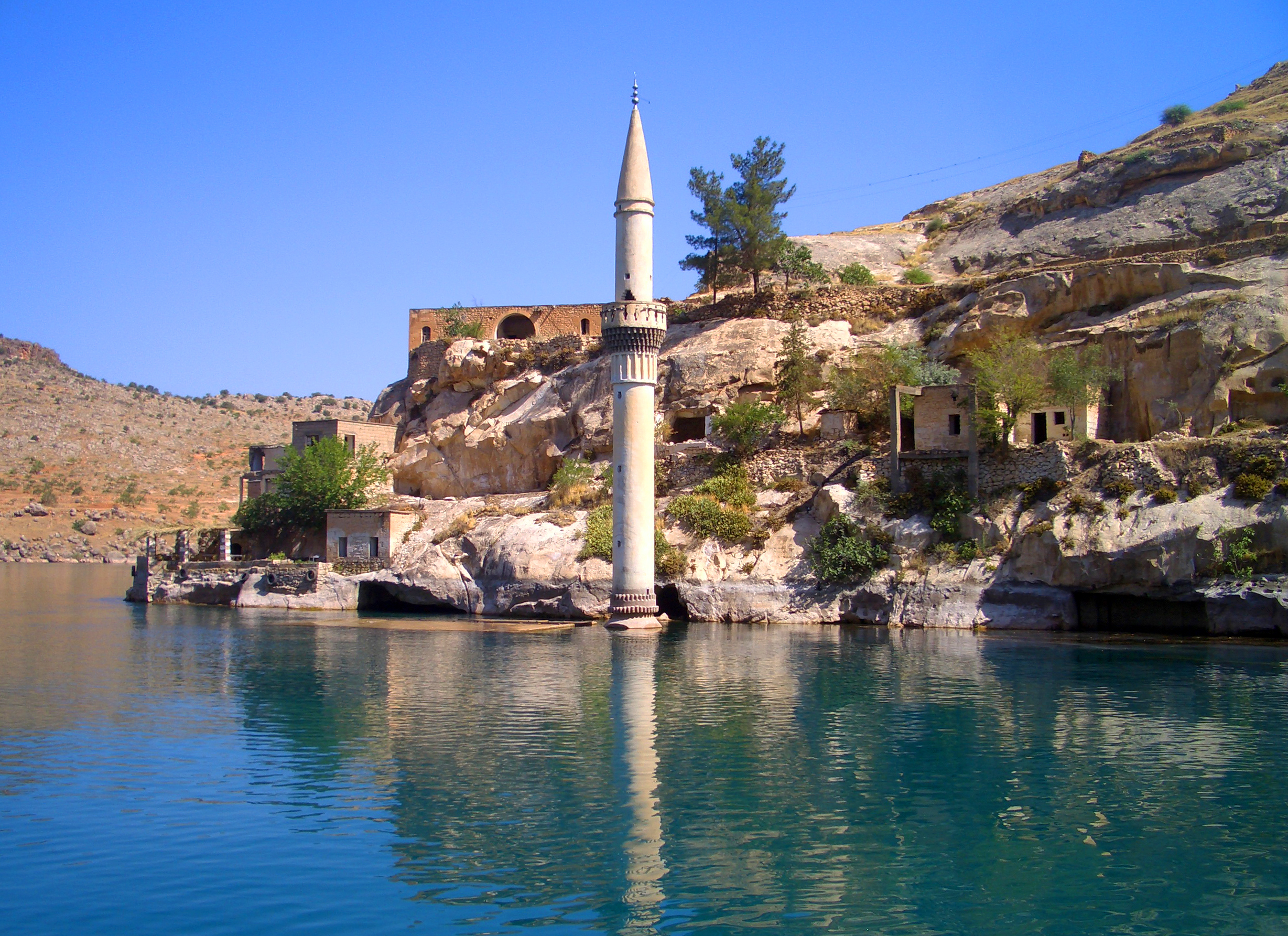
The town of Eski Savaşan Köyü (Old Savaşan Köyü), partially submerged under the rising waters of the Birecik Dam

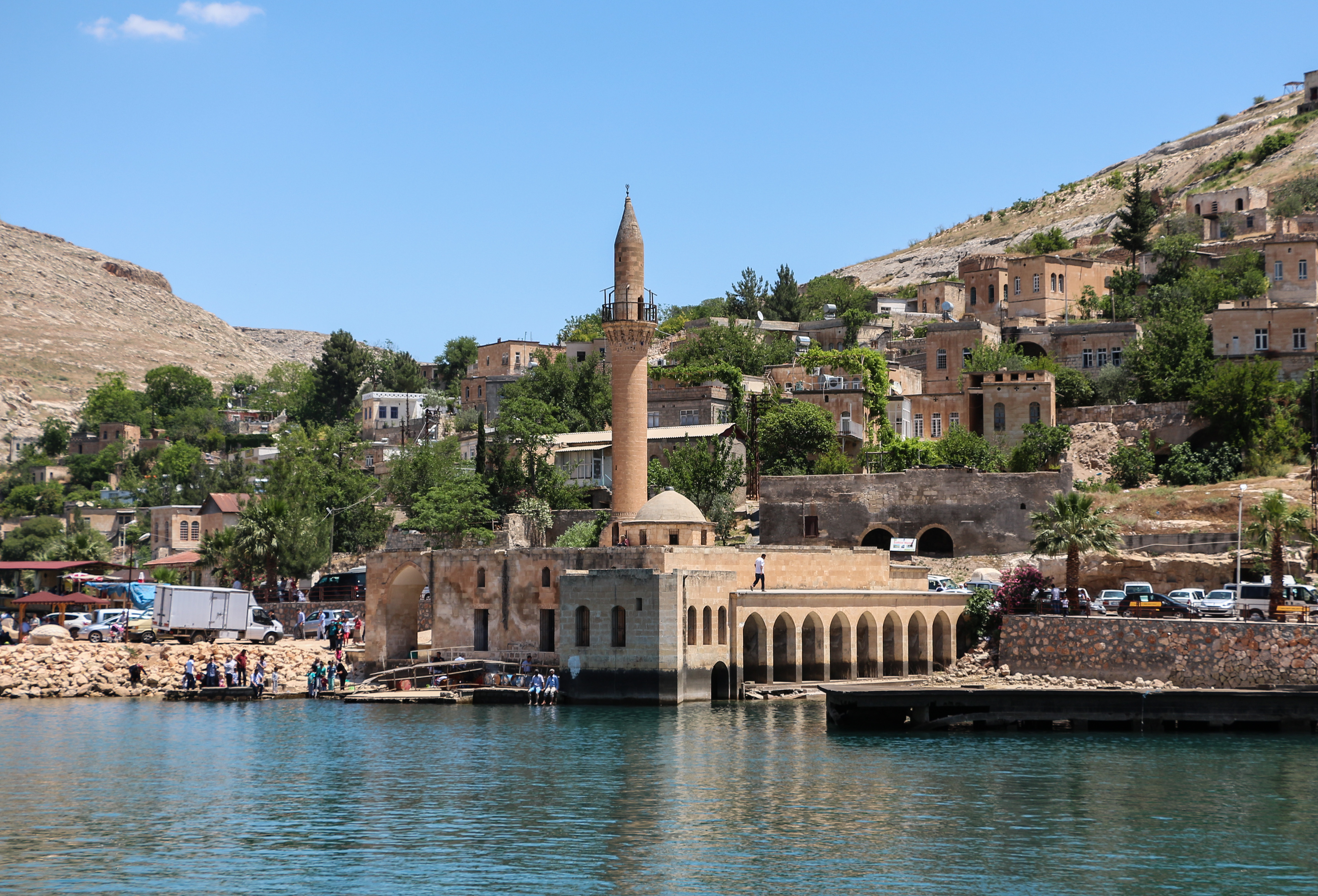
Mosque of Eski Halfeti

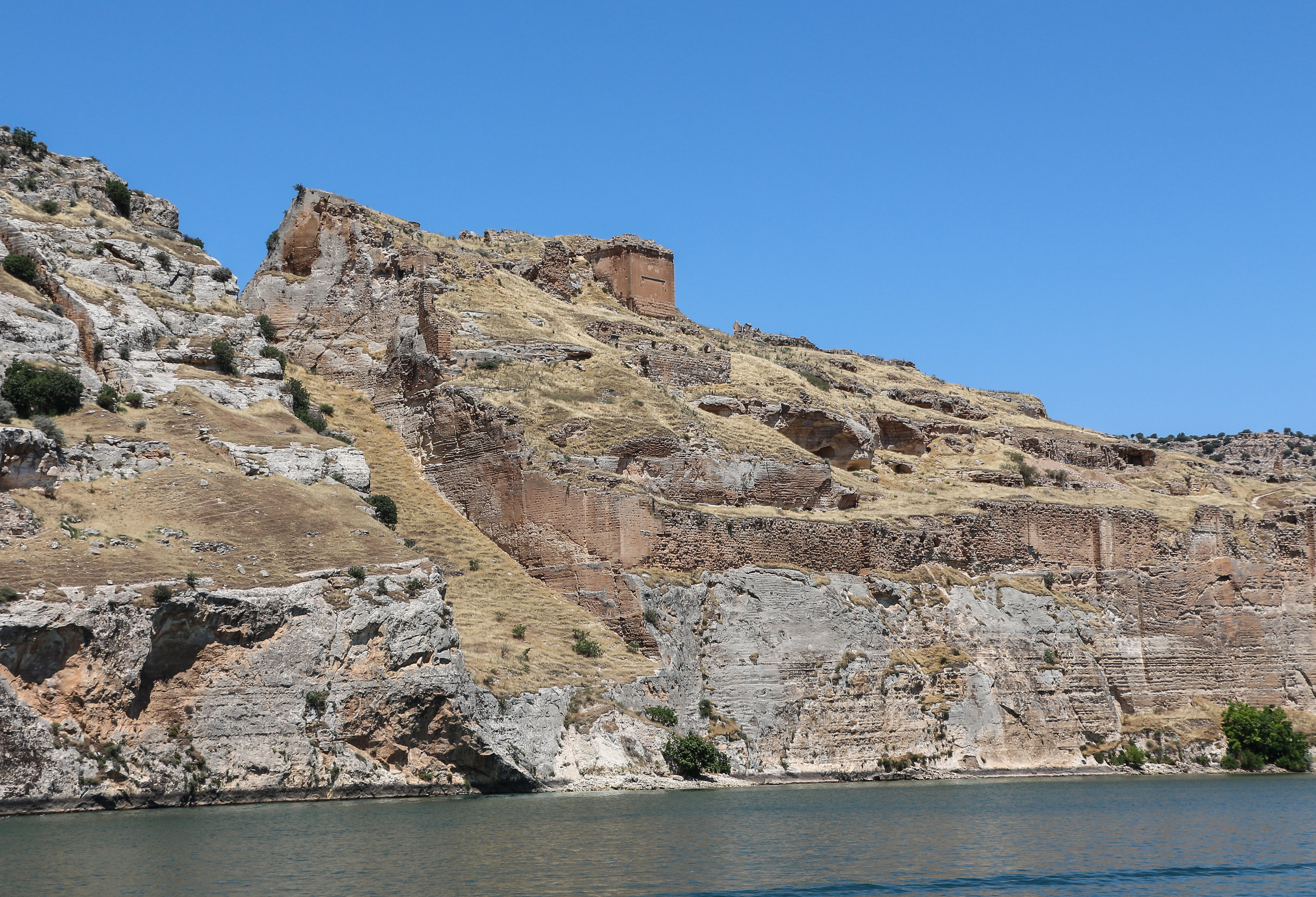
Fortress of Rumkale

== Composition ==
There are 49 neighbourhoods in Halfeti District, each headed by a muhtar:

- Altınova
- Argaç
- Argıl
- Aşağıgöğlü
- Balaban
- Beyburcu
- Bitek
- Bozyazı
- Bulaklı
- Çakallı
- Çebekoğlu
- Cumhuriyet
- Dergili
- Durak
- Dutluca
- Erikli
- Fırat
- Fıstıközü
- Gözeli
- Gülaçan
- Günece
- Gürkuyu
- Gürlüce
- Hilalli
- Kalkan
- Kantarma
- Karaotlak
- Kavaklıca
- Kayalar
- Kınık
- Kıtıklı
- Kurugöl
- Macunlu
- Narlık
- Ömerli
- Ortayol
- Özmüş
- Rüştiye
- Savaşan
- Saylakkaya
- Seldek
- Selmanlı
- Şimaliye
- Sırataşlar
- Siyahgül
- Sütveren
- Tavşanören
- Yenimahalle
- Yeşilözen
- Yukarıgöklü

== Politics ==
In the 31 March 2019 local elections, the candidate of the Justice and Development Party (AKP), Şeref Albayrak, was elected mayor with 54.92% of the votes. His first rival Peoples' Democratic Party's candidate Abdurrahman Çiftçi obtained 37.56% of votes. The current Kaymakam is Zikrullah Erdoğan.

== Tourism ==
Due in large part to the old town's partial submersion with the construction of the Birecik Dam, Halfeti has emerged as a major tourist attraction in southeastern Turkey. The district is now more appealing to tourists because of the submerged settlements and the historic fabric that has been conserved.

Visits to sunken buildings, boat cruises along the Euphrates River, and neighboring historical monuments like Rumkale are the main sources of tourism in the area. Research shows that Halfeti's endemic biodiversity, cultural legacy, and natural setting all greatly enhance its tourism potential.

Halfeti has expanded into rural and ecotourism operations after joining the Cittaslow network in 2013. Locals who formerly relied mostly on agricultural and livestock production have been encouraged to engage more actively in tourism-related economic activities as a result of this change.

== Notable people ==
- Mehmet Yasin Sani Kutluğ (1889-1973) politician
- Şevket Arman (1918-1979) one of the first artists in Turkey
- İbrahim Halil Balkıs politician
- Sabiha Gökçen (disputed, 1919-2001) first female fighter pilot
- Nuri Sesigüzel (1937-2023) Turkish artist and singer of Kurdish origin
- Melih Gökçek (born 1948) Turkish politician and former mayor of Ankara
- Abdullah Öcalan (born 1949) Kurdish politician, nationalist and founder of the Kurdish Workers Party.
- Arzu Toker (born 1952) German-speaking writer, journalist, publicist and translator
- Müslüm Gürses (1953–2013) musician
- Ahmet Kanneci (born 1957) Turkish classical guitar virtuoso
- Osman Öcalan (1958–2021) Kurdish military commander
- Mazhar Bağlı (born 1965), former Member of Parliament in the 25th term of the Turkish Grand National Assembly and former rector.
- Mehmet Karayilan (born 1969) politician and former mayor of Halfeti town
- Kewê (born 1979) Kurdish singer
- Bêrîvan Arîn (born 1981) Kurdish singer
- Ömer Öcalan (born 1987) politician
- Dilek Öcalan (born 1987) politician
- Sedat Anar (born 1988) Turkish dulcimer artist
