= Hikmet Fidan =

Turkish politician (1955–2005)

Hikmet Fidan (1955? – 6 July 2005) was a Kurdish politician in Turkey.

== Political career ==
=== Democratic People's Party ===
Fidan was the former deputy leader of the Democratic People's Party (HADEP) until it was banned by the Constitutional Court in 2003. He was also the founder of the party.

=== Patriotic Democratic Party ===
Fidan had been working to form an alternative organization called the Patriotic Democratic Party (Kurdish: Partîya Welatparêzên Demokratên; PWD) with Osman Öcalan, brother of the jailed PKK leader Abdullah Öcalan. The PWD declared that, just before his death, Fidan had met with PWD groups in Northern Iraq in order to organize their activities in Turkey. Fidan was the coordinator of the PWD which was established by Osman Ocalan after he left the PKK.

== Assassination ==
He was assassinated on 6 July 2005 around noon in Diyarbakir's Baglar district by two armed murderers who shot him once in the back of the head with a silencer.

Hikmet Fidan's son, Zınnar Tarık Fidan, claimed the Kurdistan Workers' Party (PKK) was responsible for the assassination of his father. According to a Milliyet daily report, Tarık Fidan said his father was against political interference coming from Abdullah Öcalan or the PKK groups in the north of Iraq, adding: “It's obvious who committed the murder. When one puts the pieces together, it points in one direction.” He said his father supported democratic efforts instead of armed confrontation, adding, “My father was a threat to them. He was dividing the organization. I was a witness to many threats made against him.”
