= Vassilis Rotas =

Greek author (1889–1977)

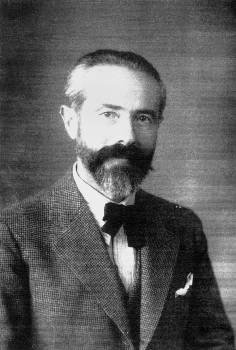

Vassilis Rotas (5 May 1889 – 30 May 1977) was a Greek author, politician, and translator of Shakespeare's dramas from English to Greek.

== Biography ==
He was born in Chiliomodi on the Peloponnese in 1889 and studied literature at the University of Athens and drama at the Athens Conservatoire. Following this, he established the Popular Theatre of Athens in 1932 and translated some theater plays of William Shakespeare into Greek during the 1930s.

After Nazi Germany occupied Greece in World War II, he joined the National Liberation Front (EAM) and established the Theater of the Mountains. Following this, he toured the country with theater plays together with members of the United Panhellenic Organization of Youth (EPON), the youth wing of the EAM. He was the author of the hymn of the EAM to a melody of the Russian Katyusha. He was the Director of Culture in the Political Committee of National Liberation (PEEA), the political resistance movement against Nazi Germany. Following the end of World War II, he was again involved in the translations of the works of Shakespeare. Rotas and Voula Damianakou published the magazine Laikos Logos between 1966 and 1967. He died in 1977.

== Legacy ==
Rotas was an important figure in the development of the Greek language, preferring the Demotic over the Katharevousa. Demotic became the official Greek language in 1976. He is also the translator of the complete works of Shakespeare from English to Greek, often using words and terms seldom used in casual Greek, both the Kathaverousa and Demotic languages.

== Personal life ==
He married his childhood friend Katerina Giannakopoulou and had three children, one of them the prominent Greek composer and theatrical contributor Nikiforos Rotas. Later, Vassilis was the partner of Velou Damianakou, who also was a member of the Greek resistance against Nazi Germany. Damianakou assisted him in several of the Shakespeare translations.
