= Ömer Öcalan =

Kurdish politician in Turkey

Ömer Öcalan MP
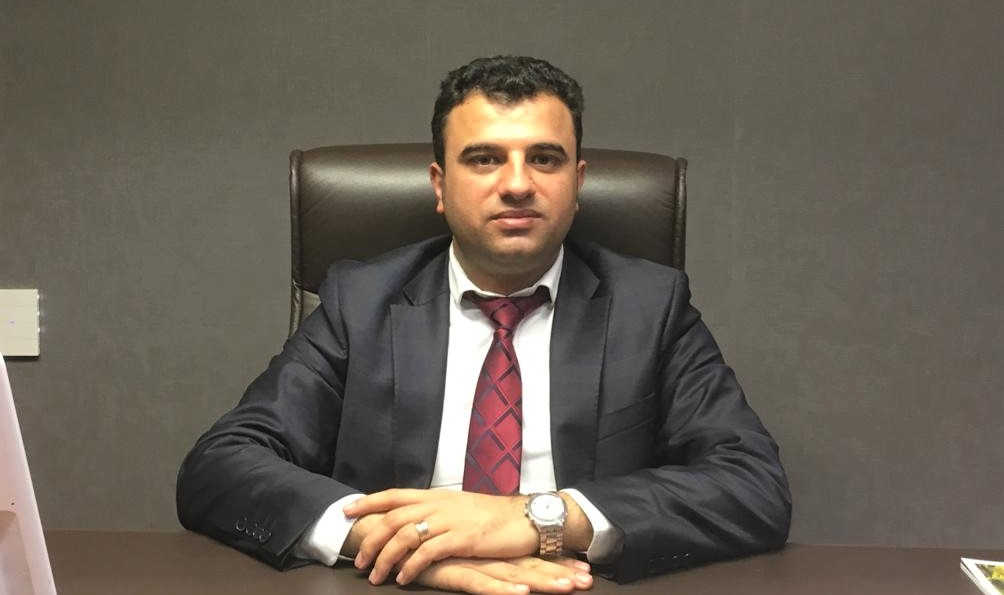

Member of the Grand National Assembly
- Incumbent
- Assumed office 7 July 2018
- Constituency: Şanlıurfa (2018, 2023)

Personal details
- Born: 1987 (age 38–39) Ömerli, Halfeti, Şanlıurfa, Turkey
- Citizenship: Turkish
- Party: DBP, HDP, DEM
- Children: 2
- Relatives: Abdullah Öcalan (uncle); Osman Öcalan (uncle); Dilek Öcalan (cousin)
- Occupation: Politician

Ömer Öcalan (born 1987) is a former politician of the Peoples' Democratic Party (HDP) and a current member of the Grand National Assembly of Turkey representing Şanlıurfa for the Peoples' Equality and Democracy Party (DEM).

== Early life and education ==
He was born in 1987 in Halfeti, Şanlıurfa, as a son of Mehmet and Fehime Öcalan. His uncle is Abdullah Öcalan, the founder of the Kurdistan Workers' Party (PKK). He spent a large part of his youth in Adana, where he graduated from high school. It was at this time he was detained to first time for a short while. After his release he studied journalism at Ankara University. In 2012 he wanted to study politics at the University of Lausanne, Switzerland, but had to abandon due to economic reasons.

== Political career ==
As he returned from Lausanne, he settled in Mardin, where his wife worked at the Municipality. In 2014 he assumed as the co-chair of the Democratic Regions Party (DBP) in Mardin, a post he held until 2016. During his tenure, he was arrested with another five in April 2016, due to an investigation on terror related charges. He was released a few months later in June of the same year. In the parliamentary elections of June 2018 he was elected to parliament for the HDP representing Şanlıurfa. On the 17 March 2021, the Turkish state prosecutor before the Court of Cassation Bekir Şahin filed a lawsuit before the Constitutional Court demanding for him and 686 other HDP politicians a five-year ban for political activities. The lawsuit was filed together with the request for a closure of the HDP due to their politicians alleged participation in terrorist activities. In the parliamentary elections of May 2023, he was re-elected to the Turkish parliament representing Şanlıurfa for the DEM.

=== Views ===
As a deputy he opposed the implementation of a law aimed at lowering the risk of contagion with COVID-19 in prisons, which released many prisoners but excluded the HDP politicians. According to him, Kurdish politicians are imprisoned for speaking about "democracy, equality, peace and freedoms". He took part in the protests against the dismissal of the HDP mayors in the south eastern part of Turkey, which were replaced by state appointed acting mayors.

== Personal life ==
Due to being Abdullah Öcalan's nephew, he was not allowed to visit his relatives in Ömerli, the birth place of Abdullah on 4 April 2018, the birthday of his uncle. Ömer Öcalan is married and has two children.
