= Ömerli, Halfeti =

Ömerli
- Neighbourhood
- Location in Turkey Ömerli (Şanlıurfa)
- Coordinates: 37°19′12″N 37°56′24″E
- Country: Turkey
- Province: Şanlıurfa
- District: Halfeti
- Elevation: 600 m (2,000 ft)
- Population (2022): 545
- Time zone: UTC+3 (TRT)

Ömerli, formerly known as Amara, is a neighbourhood of the municipality and district of Halfeti, Şanlıurfa Province, Turkey. Its population is 545 (2022).

The village is the birthplace of Abdullah Öcalan, the founder of the Kurdistan Workers' Party (PKK), who was born there on April 4, 1949. His birthday is annually celebrated by thousands of Kurds. On April 4, 2009, a group of 3,000 Kurds was marching towards Amara to celebrate Öcalan's 60th birthday. The march was interrupted by Turkish authorities resulting in clashes. Two men lost their lives.

== Notable people ==
- Abdullah Öcalan (*1949), Founder of the Kurdistan Workers' Party
- Osman Öcalan (1958-2021), Kurdish Military commander.
- Ömer Öcalan (*1987), politician of the Peoples' Democratic Party (HDP) and a current member of the Grand National Assembly of Turkey
