= Seldek =

- Neighbourhood
- Location in Turkey Seldek (Şanlıurfa)
- Coordinates: 37°15′27″N 37°54′30″E
- Country: Turkey
- Province: Şanlıurfa
- District: Halfeti
- Population (2022): 1,725
- Time zone: UTC+3 (TRT)

Seldek, formerly known as Seldik, is a neighbourhood of the municipality and district of Halfeti, Şanlıurfa Province, Turkey. Its population is 1,725 (2022). The village is situated about 2 miles east of the town of Old Halfeti, which lies on the river Euphrates (partially submerged by the reservoir behind the Birecik Dam).

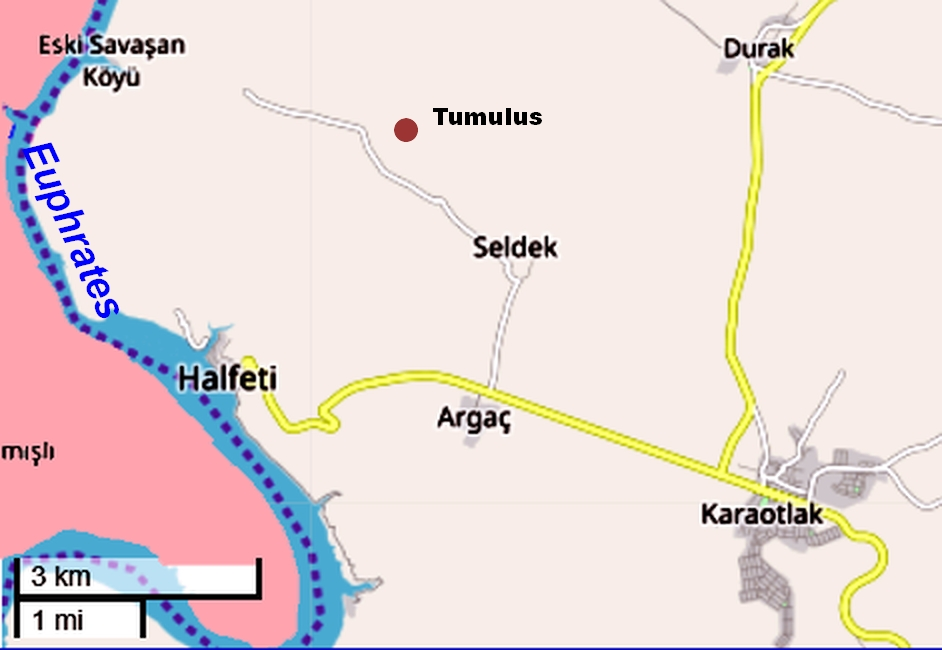
Location of the village of Seldek

The name of the village is Kurdish, derived from the personal name Salman. It is attested as Seldik in 1915 and 1928, but is now named Seldek.

About a mile north-west of the village lies an historic mound or tumulus (Höyüktepe Höyüğü). This was declared a 1st Degree Archaeological Site in 2017 by the Şanliurfa Cultural Assets Protection Board.

The village, with the immediate surroundings, including the tumulus, is constituted a mahalle (Turkish for neighbourhood), headed by a muhtar, currently Necip Büyükertaş (2023).

Historical population
Year	Pop.	±% p.a.
2007	2,523	—
2012	1,737	−7.19%
2017	1,588	−1.78%
2022	1,725	+1.67%
Source: TÜIK (2007-2022)
