= Nikiforos Rotas =

Nikiforos Rotas (Greek: Νικηφόρος Ρώτας; Athens, 1929–2004), was a prominent Greek composer and theatrical contributor.

Rotas was the son of poet and playwright Vassilis Rotas and Katerina Giannakopoulou. Educated in music from a young age, Rotas was awarded a scholarship to Athens College in 1939, where he studied under Minos Dounias. He was self-taught in playing the beaked flute and practiced both Western and Greek traditional music. During the German Occupation of Greece, he attended the Theatrical Workshop, focusing on Byzantine music under Simon Karas. Post-1944, he was involved in the Mountain Theater, contributing as a flute player, teacher, and director.

Rotas pursued further studies in composition and oboe at the Music Academy of Vienna, returning to Greece in 1962 to work as a freelance composer. His compositions encompass over 100 works, including large symphonic pieces, chamber music, oratorios, cantatas, ballet music, and electronic music. He composed for theater, film, and television, notably including ancient Greek tragedies and comedies performed at Greek festivals and internationally.

In addition to his compositions, Rotas was known for his theoretical work in music. He published How We Listen to Music in 1986, focusing on the relationship between music elements and society. His other contributions include original radio broadcast series, an unpublished experimental method for teaching music in primary schools, studies, a television screenplay, articles, and lectures.

He died from a severe illness at the age of 75.
