= Voula Damianakou =

Greek prosaist, translator and poet

Voula Damianakou (1914 – 19 September 2016) was a Greek author, translator and member of the Greek resistance against Nazi Germany.

== Biography ==
Voula Damianakou was born in Panitsa, Laconia in 1914. She was a supporter of women's political rights and collaborated with Vassilis Rotas in the translations of Shakespeare plays and with whom she published the magazine Laikos Logos between 1965 and 1967.

In January 1999, she received Abdullah Öcalan in her house upon the request of the retired Greek Admiral Antoni Naxakis. The visit of Öcalan inspired her to write a book. She died on 19 September 2016 in Athens at age 102. She was buried in Myrsini.

== Personal life ==
She was the partner of Vassilis Rotas, the Minister of Culture of the Political Committee of National Liberation (PEEA), the political movement against the Axis powers during World War II. Her daughter was painter Eleni Vassilopoulou.

== Works ==
She published several books and was involved heavily in the translation of William Shakespeare plays. She became known for portraying the classic comic playwright Aristophanes as a sympathizer of leftwing politics dubbing him Aristerophanes in her play Avgi.
