= Turgut Okyay =

Turkish judge (born 1941)

Judge at the State Security Court
- In office 1994–2000

Judge at the Court of Cassation
- In office 2000–2006

Personal details
- Born: 1941 (age 84–85) Tut, Turkey
- Citizenship: Turkish
- Party: Patriotic Party

Turgut Okyay (born 1941 Tut, Adıyaman) is a Turkish judge and politician and known for being the judge who presided over the State Security Court of Ankara which condemned Abdullah Öcalan to death.

== Education ==
He attended high school in Adana and studied law at the Faculty of Law of the University of Ankara from which he graduated in 1964. After graduation, he served in the military service for two years.

== Professional career ==
He entered the public administration and served as a judge in several cities before being appointed in 1994 as a judge at the State Security Court of Ankara. During the Trial of Abdullah Öcalan the leader of the Kurdistan Workers' Party (PKK), he presided over the State Security Court which sentenced Öcalan to death on the 29 June 1999. He stated he personally was against the death penalty but had to apply it. In the year 2000 he was appointed to the Court of Cassation from which he retired in 2006.

== Political career ==
In February 2015 he joined the Workers Party of Turkey (IP) led by Doğu Perinçek. After the party changed its name in Patriotic party (VP) in the party congress the same month, Okyay became its vice president and Adana candidate for the parliamentary election of 2015. In his electoral campaign he advocated for a Turkish worldwide leadership in the fields of human rights and democracy. He was not elected.
