= Şanlıurfa (electoral district) =

Electoral district for the Grand National Assembly of Turkey

Coordinates: 37°15′N 39°00′E

- electoral district for the Grand National Assembly of Turkey
- Şanlıurfa shown within Turkey
- Province: Şanlıurfa
- Electorate: 1.221.634

Current electoral district
- Created: 1923
- Seats: 14 Historical: 11 (1999-2011) 9 (1995-1999) 8 (1991-1995) 7 (1987-1991) 5 (1983-1987) 7 (1973-1983) 6 (1969-1973) 7 (1961-1969) 9 (1957-1961) 8 (1954-1957)
- MPs: List: Bekir Bozdağ AK Party Abdulkadir Emin Önen AK Party Abdürrahi̇m Dusak AK Party Mehmet Ali Cevheri AK Party Cevahi̇r Asuman Yazmacı AK Party İbrahi̇m Eyyüpoğlu AK Party Hi̇kmet Başak AK Party Mehmet Faruk Pınarbaşı AK Party Mithat Sancar DEM Party Ömer Öcalan DEM Party Di̇lan Kunt Ayan DEM Party Ferit Şenyaşar DEM Party İbrahim Özyavuz MHP Mahmut Tanal CHP
- Turnout at last election: 81.82%
- Representation
- AK Party: 8 / 14
- DEM: 4 / 14
- MHP: 1 / 14
- CHP: 1 / 14

Şanlıurfa is an electoral district of the Grand National Assembly of Turkey. It elects twelve members of parliament (deputies) to represent the province of the same name for a four-year term by the D'Hondt method, a party-list proportional representation system.

== Members ==
Population reviews of each electoral district are conducted before each general election, which can lead to certain districts being granted a smaller or greater number of parliamentary seats. Şanlıurfa is one of the largest in southeast Turkey, sending twelve members to Ankara.

The overwhelming majority of members are from the governing party. Şanlıurfa is a district where the pro-Kurdish Peace and Democracy Party (BDP) ran independent candidates in an attempt to overcome the 10 percent national electoral threshold. One such independent candidates was elected here in 2011 and has joined the BDP; another independent candidate was also elected.

MPs for Şanlıurfa, 1999 onwards
Seat	1999 (21st parliament)	2002 (22nd parliament)	2007 (23rd parliament)	2011 (24th parliament)	June 2015 (25th parliament)
1	Yahya Akman; Virtue	Yahya Akman; AK Party			Nureddin Nebati; AK Party
2	Mehmet Fevzi Şıhanlıoğlu; DYP	Mahmut Kaplan; AK Party	Abdulkadir Emin Önen; AK Party		Mazhar Bağlı; AK Party
3	Zülfikar İzol; Virtue	Zülfikar İzol; AK Party		Abdülkerim Gök; AK Party	Hamide Sürücü; AK Party
4	Sedat Edip Bucak; DYP	Abdurrahman Müfit Yetkin; AK Party		Mehmet Akyürek; AK Party	Ahmet Eşref Fakıbaba; AK Party
5	Mehmet Yalçınkaya; DYP	Mehmet Atılla Maraş; AK Party	Seyit Eyyüpoğlu; Independent / AK Party		
6	Necmettin Cevheri; DYP	Mehmet Faruk Bayrak; AK Party	Ramazan Başak; AK Party	Halil Özcan; AK Party	
7	Ahmet Karavar; Virtue	Mehmet Özlek; AK Party	Sabahttin Cevheri; AK Party	Mehmet Kasım Gülpınar; AK Party	
8	Eyyüp Cenap Gülpınar; Motherland	Mehmet Vedat Melik; CHP	Eyyüp Cenap Gülpınar; AK Party	Mahmut Kaçar; AK Party	Dilek Öcalan; HDP
9	Muzaffer Çakmaklı; MHP	Mahmut Yıldız; CHP	Mustafa Kuş; AK Party	Zeynep Armağan Uslu; AK Party	Osman Baydemir; HDP
10	Mustafa Niyazi Yanmaz; Virtue	Sabahattin Cevheri; Independent	Çağla Aktemur Özyavuz; AK Party	Faruk Çelik; AK Party	Ziya Çalışkan; HDP
11	Mehmet Güneş; Motherland	Turan Tüysüz; CHP	İbrahim Binici; Independent (DTP/BDP)		Leyla Güven; HDP
12	No seat			İbrahim Ayhan; Independent (BDP) / HDP	

== General elections ==
=== 2011 ===
2011 Turkish general election: Şanlıurfa
List	Candidates	Votes	Of total (%)	± from prev.
AK Party	Faruk Çelik, Seyit Eyyüpoğlu, Mehmet Kasım Gülpınar, Mehmet Akyürek, Zeynep Armağan Uslu, Halil Özcan, Mahmur Kaçar, Abdulkadir Emin Önen, Yahya Akman, Abdulkerim Gök	430,453	63.46	
Independent	İbrahim Ayhan	77,416	11.41	
Independent	İbrahim Binici	42,463	22.84	
Independent	Ahmet Ersin Bucak (not elected)	31,090	4.58	
MHP	None elected	22,357	3.30	
CHP	None elected	21,777	3.21	
Other independents	None elected	18,445	2.72	
Independent	Zülfikar İzol (not elected)	14,724	2.17	
Büyük Birlik	None elected	6,220	0.92	
HAS Party	None elected	5,925	0.87	N/A
SAADET	None elected	3,382	0.5	
DP	None elected	1,743	0.26	
TKP	None elected	1,235	0.18	
DSP	None elected	700	0.1	'"`UNIQ−−ref−0000000E−QINU`"'
DYP	None elected	598	0.09	
Nationalist Conservative	None elected	555	0.08	
MP	None elected	426	0.06	
Labour	None elected	0		
Liberal Democrat	None elected	0		
HEPAR	None elected	0		
Turnout		678,286	82.14	

=== June 2015 ===
Abbr.	Party	Votes	%
AK Party	Justice and Development Party	356,537	46.7%
HDP	Peoples' Democratic Party	293,841	38.5%
CHP	Republican People's Party	31,273	4.1%
MHP	Nationalist Movement Party	42,479	5.6%
	Other	39,250	5.1%
Total		763,380	
Turnout		80.21	
source: YSK

=== November 2015 ===
Abbr.	Party	Votes	%
AK Party	Justice and Development Party	519,079	64.6%
HDP	Peoples' Democratic Party	228,807	28.5%
CHP	Republican People's Party	21,686	2.7%
MHP	Nationalist Movement Party	22,086	2.7%
	Other	12,228	1.5%
Total		803,885	
Turnout		83,77	
source: YSK

=== 2018 ===
Abbr.	Party	Votes	%
AK Party	Justice and Development Party	440,085	52.2%
HDP	Peoples' Democratic Party	247,256	29.3%
MHP	Nationalist Movement Party	77,479	9.2%
CHP	Republican People's Party	28,880	3.4%
IYI	Good Party	14,965	1.8%
HÜDA-PAR	Free Cause Party	13,495	1.6%
SP	Felicity Party	10,913	1.3%
	Other	10,788	1.3%
Total		843,861	
Turnout		81.48	
source: YSK

=== 2023 ===
Abbr.	Party	Votes	%
AK Party	Justice and Development Party	424.999	43%
YSGP	Party of Greens and the Left Future	245.500	24.8%
MHP	Nationalist Movement Party	93.267	9.4%
CHP	Republican People's Party	79.539	8%
	Independent	51.399	5.2%
IYI	Good Party	45.097	4.6%
YRP	New Welfare Party	28.949	2.9%
	Other	20.404	2.1%
Total		999.527	
Turnout		81.82%	
source: YSK

== Presidential elections ==
=== 2014 ===
Presidential Election 2014: Şanlıurfa
Party	Candidate	Votes	%
AK Party	Recep Tayyip Erdoğan	455,170	68.60
HDP	Selahattin Demirtaş	174,075	26.24
Independent	Ekmeleddin İhsanoğlu	34,251	5.16
Total votes		663,496	100.00
Rejected ballots		7,933	1.18
Turnout		671,429	71.86
Recep Tayyip Erdoğan win			
