= Abdullah Öcalan =

Founder of the Kurdistan Workers' Party (PKK)

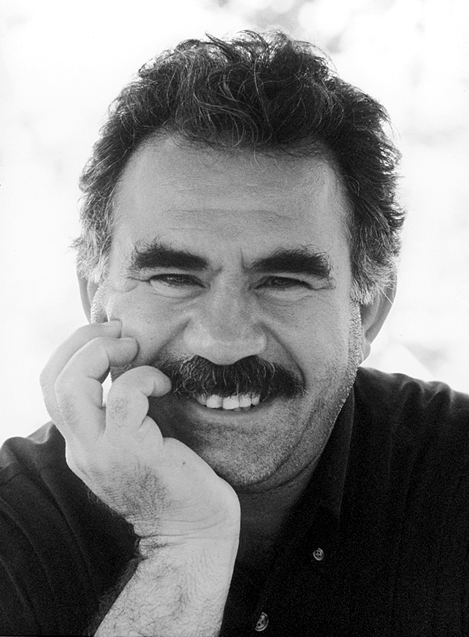
- Öcalan in 1997
- Born: 4 April 1948 (age 78) or 4 April 1949 (age 77); Ömerli, Turkey
- Citizenship: Turkey
- Occupations: Founder and leader of militant organization PKK, political activist, writer, political theorist
- Organization(s): Kurdistan Workers' Party (PKK), Kurdistan Communities Union (KCK)
- Spouse: Kesire Yıldırım (m. 1978)
- Relatives: Osman Öcalan (brother); Ömer Öcalan (nephew); Dilek Öcalan (niece)

Education
- Education: Faculty of Political Science, Ankara University

Philosophical work
- Notable ideas: Democratic confederalism Jineology

Abdullah Öcalan (/ˈoʊdʒəlɑːn/ OH-jə-lahn; Turkish: [œdʒaɫan]; born 4 April 1948 or 1949), also known as Apo (short for Abdullah in Turkish; Kurdish for "uncle"), is a founding member of the militant Kurdistan Workers' Party (PKK).

Öcalan was based in Syria from 1979 to 1998. He helped found the PKK in 1978, and led it into the Kurdish–Turkish conflict in 1984. For most of his leadership, he was based in Syria, which provided sanctuary to the PKK until the late 1990s.

After being forced to leave Syria, Öcalan was abducted by the Turkish National Intelligence Organization (MIT) in Nairobi, Kenya in February 1999 and imprisoned on İmralı island in Turkey, where after a trial he was sentenced to death under Article 125 of the Turkish Penal Code, which concerns the formation of armed organizations. The sentence was commuted to aggravated life imprisonment when Turkey abolished the death penalty. From 1999 until 2009, he was the sole prisoner in İmralı prison in the Sea of Marmara, where he is still held.

Öcalan has advocated for a political solution to the conflict since the 1993 Kurdistan Workers' Party ceasefire. Öcalan's prison regime has oscillated between long periods of isolation during which he is allowed no contact with the outside world, and periods when he is permitted visits. He was also involved in negotiations with the Turkish government that led to a temporary Kurdish–Turkish peace process in 2013. In February 2025, he issued a statement from prison calling on the PKK to disarm and disband itself, after which the group's leadership declared a unilateral ceasefire.

From prison, Öcalan has published several books. Jineology, also known as the science of women, is a form of feminism advocated by Öcalan and subsequently a fundamental tenet of the Kurdistan Communities Union (KCK). Öcalan's philosophy of democratic confederalism was applied in the Democratic Autonomous Administration of North and East Syria (DAANES), an autonomous polity formed in Syria in 2012.

== Early life and education ==
Öcalan was born in Ömerli, a village in the Halfeti district of Şanlıurfa Province in southeastern Turkey. Ömerli had a diverse population of Kurds, Turks, and Armenians, who were all integrated among each other. Öcalan claimed that his father was Kurdish, while his mother was Turkmen. Öcalan's maternal grandmother was a known Turk. While some sources report his date of birth as 4 April 1949, no official birth records exist. He has claimed not to know exactly when he was born, estimating the year to be 1946 or 1947. He is the oldest of seven children. Öcalan's father was poor even by local standards, and he once said that there was "always fighting" and "an overwhelming unhappiness" in his family.

When asked about their ethnic origin, his younger brother Osman Öcalan stated that their paternal family was fully Kurdish, while their maternal family was of mixed Kurdish, Turkish, Arab, and Assyrian origins. While Abdullah Öcalan claimed that their mother was fully Turkmen, Osman Öcalan disputed it, stating that many Albanian and other Balkan migrants were imported to the region by the Ottomans and identified as Turks, although he did not fully dismiss the possibility of their mother being Turkish. When asked about their surname, Osman Öcalan stated that "öc" meant "revenge" in Turkish, and that after Ottoman Turkish authorities came to their village and demanded women, his paternal grandfather Hüseyin Ağa refused and began fighting the Ottomans, during which his younger brother Abdi Ağa was killed. After the death of Abdi Ağa, Hüseyin Ağa led more revenge attacks on the Ottomans and drove them away. The family was celebrated by other Kurds and known as "Mala Ocê" ("House of Revenge"). After the Surname Law, the surname was Turkified to "Öcalan", meaning "revengeful".

Abdullah Öcalan spoke only Kurdish until elementary school, which he attended in a neighboring village. After he began school, he learned Turkish and began assimilating. He was impacted by Turkish nationalist school curriculum and dreamed of joining the Turkish army when he grew up. He applied to a military high school for future commissioned officers, but had failed the admission exam. Rejected from the military high school, Öcalan enrolled in a vocational high school in Ankara (Turkish: Ankara Tapu-Kadastro Meslek Lisesi) in 1966. During high school, he attended anti-communist meetings, and occasionally Pro-Kurdish meetings set up by left-wing circles. Öcalan did not think about his Kurdish identity in a political way until he was nearly 20 years old. Öcalan was also a very conservative Muslim in his youth and admired Necip Fazıl Kısakürek. After graduating in 1969, Öcalan began working at the Title Deeds Office of Diyarbakır. It was at this time his political affiliation began to reform. He was relocated one year later to Istanbul where he participated in the meetings of the Revolutionary Cultural Eastern Hearths (DDKO), a Kurdish organization. Later, he entered the Istanbul Law Faculty but after the first year transferred to Ankara University to study political science.

According to a book by journalist Necdet Pekmezci, Öcalan's return to Ankara was facilitated by the state in order to divide the Dev-Genç (Revolutionary Youth Federation of Turkey), of which Öcalan was a member. President Süleyman Demirel later regretted this decision, since the PKK was to become a much greater threat to the state than Dev-Genç.

Öcalan was not able to graduate from Ankara University, as on 7 April 1972 he was arrested after participating in a rally against the killing of Mahir Çayan. He was charged with distributing the left-wing political magazine Şafak (published by Doğu Perinçek) and was held for seven months at the Mamak Prison. In November 1973, the Ankara Democratic Association of Higher Education, (Ankara Demokratik Yüksek Öğrenim Demeği, ADYÖD) was founded and shortly after he was elected to join its board. In the ADYÖD several students close to the political views of Hikmet Kıvılcımlı were active. In December 1974, ADYÖD was closed down. In 1975, together with Mazlum Doğan and Mehmet Hayri Durmuş, he published a political booklet which described the main aims for a Revolution in Kurdistan. During meetings in Ankara between 1974 and 1975, Öcalan and others came to the conclusion that Kurdistan was a colony and preparations ought to be made for a revolution. The group decided to disperse into the different towns in Turkish Kurdistan in order to set up a base of supporters for an armed revolution. At the beginning, this idea had only a few supporters, but following a journey Öcalan made through the cities of Ağrı, Batman, Diyarbakır, Bingöl, Kars and Urfa in 1977, the group counted over 300 adherents and had organised about thirty armed militants.

== The Kurdistan Workers' Party ==
In 1978, in the midst of the right- and left-wing conflicts which culminated in the 1980 Turkish coup d'état, Öcalan founded the Kurdistan Workers' Party (PKK). In July 1979 he fled to Syria.

Since its foundation, the party focused on ideological training. In 1987, Öcalan saw the success of the party as based on the application of Marxism–Leninism to the specific conditions of Kurdistan. Öcalan elaborated on the importance of ideology to the extent to where he condemned ideologylessness and equated ideology with religion which according to him had replaced the latter. "If you break the link between yourself and ideology you will beastialize," he told his followers. With the support of the Syrian Government, he established two training camps for the PKK in Lebanon where the Kurdish guerrillas should receive political and military training.

In 1984, the PKK initiated a campaign of armed conflict by attacking government forces in order to create an independent Kurdish state. Öcalan attempted to unite the Kurdish liberation movements of the PKK and the one active against Saddam Hussein in Iraq. In negotiations between the Kurdistan Democratic Party (KDP) and the PKK, it was agreed that the latter was able to move freely in Iraqi Kurdistan. He also met twice with Masoud Barzani, the leader of the KDP in Damascus, to resolve some minor issues they had once in 1984 and another time in 1985. But due to pressure from Turkey the cooperation remained timid. During an interview he gave to the Turkish Milliyet in 1988, he mentioned the goal wasn't to gain independence from Turkey at all costs, but remained firm on the issue of the Kurdish rights, and suggested that negotiations should take place for a federation to be established in Turkey. In 1988, he also met with Jalal Talabani of the Patriotic Union of Kurdistan (PUK) in Damascus, with which he signed an agreement and after some differences after the foundation of a Kurdish Government in Iraqi Kurdistan in 1992 he later had a better relationship.

In the early 1990s, interviews given to both Doğu Perinçek and Hasan Bildirici he mentioned his willingness to achieve a peaceful solution to the conflict. In another given to Oral Çalışlar, he emphasized the difference between independence and separatism. He articulated the view that different nations were able to live in independence within the same state if they had equal rights. Then in 1993, upon request of Turkish president Turgut Özal, Öcalan met with Jalal Talabani for negotiations following which Öcalan declared a unilateral cease fire which had a duration from 20 March to 15 April. Later he prolonged it in order to enable negotiations with the Turkish government. Soon after Özal died on 17 April 1993, the initiative was halted by Turkey on the grounds that Turkey did not negotiate with terrorists. During an International Kurdish Conference in Brussels in March 1994, his initiative for equal rights for Kurds and Turks within Turkey was discussed. It is reported by Gottfried Stein, that at least during the first half of the 1990s, he used to live mainly in a protected neighborhood in Damascus. On 7 May 1996, in the midst of another unilateral cease-fire declared by the PKK, an attempt to assassinate him in a house in Damascus, was unsuccessful.

Following the protests which arose against the prohibition of the PKK in Germany, Öcalan had several meetings with politicians from Germany who came to hold talks with him. In the summer of 1995 the president of the Federal Office for the Protection of the Constitution (Verfassungsschutz) Klaus Grünewald came to visit him, And with the German MP Heinrich Lummer of the Christian Democratic Union of Germany (CDU) he held meetings in October 1995 in Damascus and March 1996, during which they discussed the PKK's activities in Germany. Öcalan assured him that the PKK would support a peaceful solution for the conflict. Back in Germany, Lummer made a statement in support for further negotiations with Öcalan. With time, the United States (1997), European Union, Syria, Turkey, and other countries have included the PKK on their lists of terrorist organizations. A Greek parliamentary delegation from the PASOK came to visit him in the Beqaa valley on 17 October 1996. During his stay in Syria he has published several books concerning the Kurdish revolution. On at least one occasion, in 1993, he was detained and held by Syria's General Intelligence Directorate, but later released. Until 1998, Öcalan was based in Syria. As the situation deteriorated in Turkey, the Turkish government openly threatened Syria over its support for the PKK. As a result, the Syrian government forced Öcalan to leave the country but still refused turning him over to the Turkish authorities. In October 1998, Öcalan prepared for his departure from Syria and during a meeting in Kobane, he unsuccessfully attempted to lay the foundations for a new party which failed due to Syrian intelligence's obstruction.

== Exile in Europe ==
Öcalan left Syria on 9 October 1998 and for the next four months, he toured several European countries advocating for a solution of the Kurdish-Turkish conflict. Öcalan first went to Russia where the Russian parliament voted on 4 November 1998 to grant him asylum. On 6 November 109 Greek parliamentarians invited Öcalan to stay in Greece, a move which was repeated by Panayioitis Sgouridis, the deputy speaker of the Greek Parliament at the time. Öcalan then chose to travel to Italy, where he landed on 12 November 1998 at the airport in Rome.

In 1998 the Turkish government requested the extradition of Öcalan from Italy, where he applied for political asylum upon his arrival. He was detained by the Italian authorities due to an arrest warrant issued by Germany. But Italy did not extradite him to Germany, who refused to hold a trial on Öcalan in its country. The German chancellor Gerhard Schröder as well as the Minister of the Interior Otto Schily preferred that Öcalan would be tried by an unspecified "European Court". Italy also didn't extradite him to Turkey. The Italian prime minister Massimo D'Alema announced it was contrary to Italian law to extradite someone to a country where the defendant is threatened with a capital punishment. But Italy also didn't want Öcalan to stay, and pulled several diplomatic strings to compel him to leave the country, which was accomplished on 16 January when he departed to Nizhny Novgorod in hope to find a safe haven in Russia. But in Russia he was not as much welcomed as in October, and he had to wait for a week at the airport of Strigino International Airport in Nizhny Novgorod. From Russia, he took an airplane from Saint Petersburg to Greece where he arrived in Athens upon the invitation of Nikolas Naxakis, a retired Admiral on 29 January 1999. He spent the night as a guest of the popular Greek author Voula Damianakou in Nea Makri.

Following this, Öcalan attempted to travel to The Hague, to pursue a settlement of his legal situation at the International Criminal Court, but the Netherlands would not let his plane land and sent him back to Greece where he landed on the island Corfu in the Ionean Sea. Öcalan then decided to fly to Nairobi at the invitation of Greek diplomats. At that time he was defended by Britta Böhler, a high-profile German attorney who argued that the crimes he was accused of would have to be proven in court and attempted to reach that the International Court in The Hague would assume the case.

== Abduction, trial, and imprisonment ==
Öcalan was abducted in Kenya on 15 February 1999, while on his way from the Greek embassy to Jomo Kenyatta International Airport in Nairobi, in an operation by the Turkish National Intelligence Organization (Turkish: Millî İstihbarat Teşkilatı, MIT), with the help of the CIA.

Following his capture, the Greek Government was in turmoil and Foreign Minister Theodoros Pangalos, Interior Minister Alekos Papadopoulos and the Minister of Public Order Philipos Petsalnikos resigned from their posts. Costoulas, the Greek ambassador who protected him, said that his own life was in danger after the operation. According to Nucan Derya, Öcalan's interpreter in Kenya, the Kenyans had warned the Greek ambassador that "something" might happen if he didn't leave four days prior and that they were given the assurance by Pangalos that Öcalan would have safe passage to Europe. Öcalan was determined to travel to Amsterdam and face the accusations of terrorism. Öcalan's capture led thousands of Kurds to hold worldwide protests condemning his capture at Greek and Israeli embassies. Kurds living in Germany were threatened with deportation if they continued to hold demonstrations in support of Öcalan. The warning came after three Kurds were killed and 16 injured during the 1999 attack on the Israeli consulate in Berlin. A group named the Revenge Hawks of Apo set fire to a department store in Kadıköy Istanbul, causing the death of 13 people. In several European capitals and larger cities as well as in Iraq, Iran and also Turkey protests were organized against his capture.

=== Trial ===
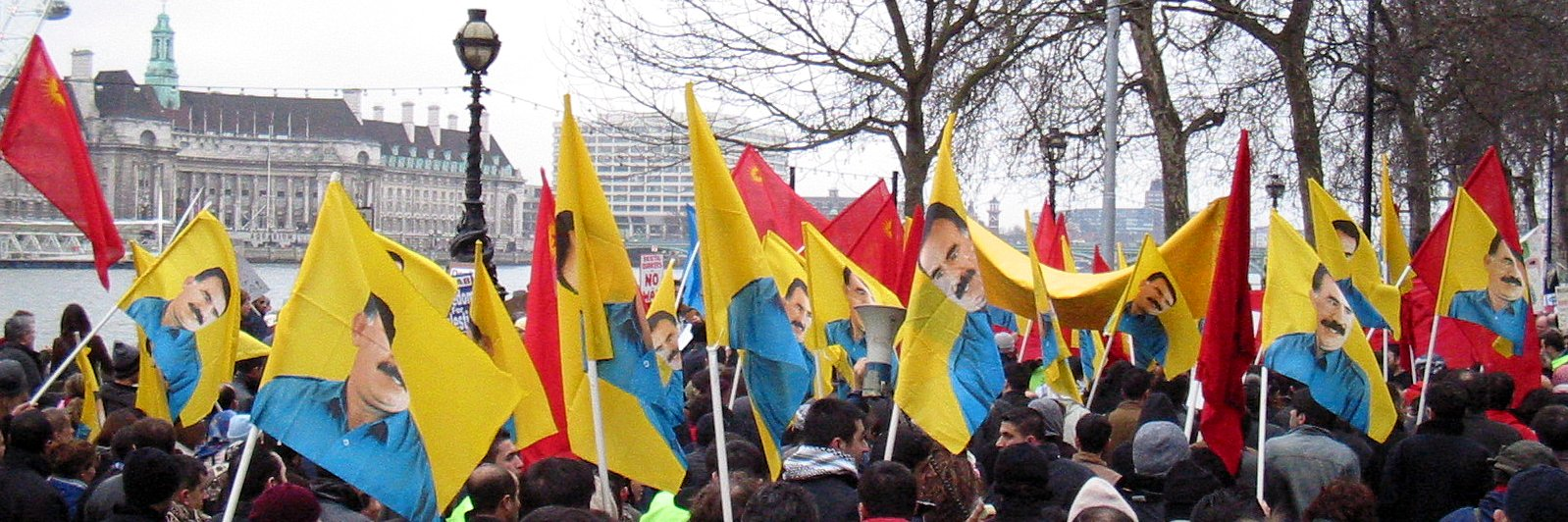
Öcalan supporters in London, April 2003

He was brought to İmralı island, where he was interrogated for a period of 10 days without being allowed to see or speak to his lawyers. A state security court consisting of one military and two civilian judges was established on İmralı island to try Öcalan. A delegation of three Dutch lawyers who intended to defend him were not allowed to meet with their client and detained for questioning at the airport on the grounds that they acted as "PKK militants" and not lawyers; they were sent back to the Netherlands. On the seventh day a judge took part in the interrogations, and prepared a transcript of it. The trial began on 31 May 1999 on the İmralı island in the Sea of Marmara, and was organized by the Ankara State Security Court. During the trial, he was represented by the Asrın Law Office. His lawyers had difficulty in representing him adequately as they were allowed only two interviews per week of initially a duration of 20 minutes, and later 1 hour, of which several were cancelled due to "bad weather" or because the authorities didn't give the permission needed for them. Also his lawyers were unaware of what the charges might be, and received the formal indictment only after excerpts of it were already presented to the press. The trial was accompanied by arrests of scores of Kurdish politicians from the People's Democracy Party (HADEP). In mid-June 1999, the Grand National Assembly of Turkey approved the removal of military judges from the State Security Courts, in an attempt to address criticism from the European Court of Human Rights and a civilian judge assumed the post of the military judge. Shortly before the verdict was read out by Judge Turgut Okyay, when asked about his final remarks, he again offered to play a role in the peace finding process. Öcalan was charged with treason and separatism and sentenced to death on 29 June 1999. He was also banned from holding public office for life.

On the same day, Amnesty International (AI) demanded a re-trial and Human Rights Watch (HRW) questioned the fact that witnesses brought by the defense were not heard in the trial. In 1999 the Turkish Parliament discussed a so-called Repentance Bill which would commute Öcalans death sentence to 20 years imprisonment and allow PKK militants to surrender with a limited amnesty, but it didn't pass due to resistance from the far-right around the Nationalist Movement Party (MHP). In January 2000 the Turkish government declared the death sentence was delayed until the European Court of Human Rights (ECHR) reviewed the verdict. Upon the abolition of the death penalty in Turkey in August 2002, in October of that year, the security court commuted his sentence to life imprisonment.

In an attempt to reach a verdict which was more favorable to Öcalan, he appealed at the ECHR at Strasbourg, which accepted the case in June 2004. In 2005, the ECHR ruled that Turkey had violated articles 3, 5, and 6 of the European Convention of Human Rights by refusing to allow Öcalan to appeal his arrest and by sentencing him to death without a fair trial. Öcalan's request for a retrial was refused by Turkish courts.

=== Detention conditions ===
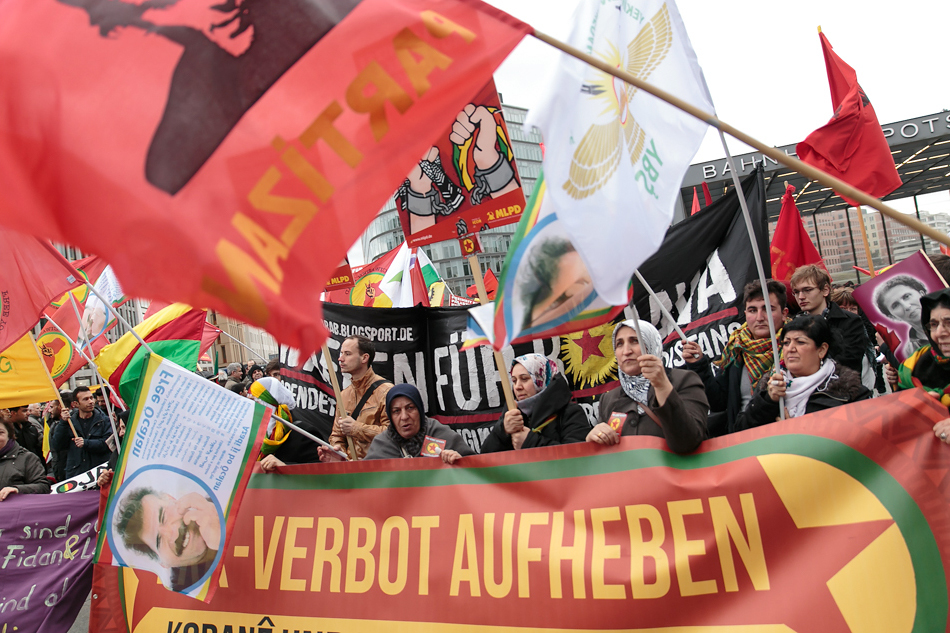
Protest for freedom of Öcalan in Germany, 21 January 2016

After his capture, Öcalan was held in solitary confinement as the only prisoner on İmralı island in the Sea of Marmara. Following the commutation of the death sentence to a life sentence in 2002, Öcalan remained imprisoned on İmralı, and was the sole inmate there. Although former prisoners at İmralı were transferred to other prisons, more than 1,000 Turkish military personnel were stationed on the island to guard him. In November 2009, Turkish authorities announced that they were ending his solitary confinement by transferring several other prisoners to İmralı. They said that Öcalan would be allowed to see them for ten hours a week. The new prison was built after the Council of Europe's Committee for the Prevention of Torture visited the island and objected to the conditions in which he was being held. From 27 July 2011 until 2 May 2019 his lawyers have not been allowed to see Abdullah Öcalan. From July 2011 until December 2017 his lawyers filed more than 700 appeals for visits, but all were rejected.

There have been held regular demonstrations by the Kurdish community to raise awareness of the isolation of Öcalan. In October 2012 several hundred Kurdish political prisoners went on hunger strike for better detention conditions for Öcalan and the right to use the Kurdish language in education and jurisprudence. The hunger strike lasted 68 days until Öcalan demanded its end. Öcalan was banned from receiving visits almost two years from 6 October 2014 until 11 September 2016, when his brother Mehmet Öcalan visited him for Eid al-Adha. In 2014 the ECHR ruled in that there was a violation of article 3 in regards of him being to only prisoner on İmarli island until 17 November 2009, as well as the impossibility to appeal his verdict. On 6 September 2018 visits from lawyers were banned for six months due to former punishments he received in the years 2005–2009, the fact that the lawyers made their conversations with Ocalan public, and the impression that Öcalan was leading the PKK through communications with his lawyers. He was again banned from receiving visits until 12 January 2019 when his brother was permitted to visit him a second time. His brother said his health was good. The ban on the visitation of his lawyers was lifted in April 2019, and Öcalan saw his lawyers on 2 May 2019.

== Post-Arrest Thought and Peace Process ==
=== Involvement in peace initiatives ===
In November 1998, Öcalan elaborated on a 7-point peace plan according to which the Turkish attacks on Kurdish villages should stop, the refugees would be allowed to return, the Kurdish people would be granted autonomy within Turkey, the Kurds would receive the equal democratic rights as the Turks and the Turkish government supported village guards system shall come to an end and the Kurdish language and culture was to be officially recognized. In January 1999 during his stay in Europe, Öcalan saw the parties liberation struggle focus to have developed from guerrilla warfare to dialogue and negotiations. After his capture Öcalan called for a halt in PKK attacks, and advocated for a peaceful solution for the Kurdish conflict inside the borders of Turkey. In October 1999, eight PKK militants around the former European PKK spokesman Ali Sapan turned themselves in to Turkey on request of Öcalan. Depending on their treatment, the other PKK militants would turn themselves in as well, his attorney announced. But the eight, as well as another group which surrendered a few weeks later in Istanbul, were imprisoned and the peace initiative was dismissed by the Turkish Government. Öcalan called for the foundation of a "Truth and Justice Commission" by Kurdish institutions in order to investigate war crimes committed by both the PKK and Turkish security forces. A similar structure began functioning in May 2006.

Öcalan had his lawyer Ibrahim Bilmez release a statement on 28 September 2006 calling on the PKK to declare a ceasefire and seek peace with Turkey. Öcalan's statement said, "The PKK should not use weapons unless it is attacked with the aim of annihilation," and "it is very important to build a democratic union between Turks and Kurds. With this process, the way to democratic dialogue will be also opened". He worked on a solution for the Kurdish–Turkish conflict, which would include a decentralization and democratization of Turkey within the frame of the European Charter of local Self-Government, which was also signed by Turkey, but his 160-page proposal on the subject was confiscated by the Turkish authorities in August 2009.

On 31 May 2010, Öcalan said he was abandoning the ongoing dialogue with Turkey, as "this process is no longer meaningful or useful". Öcalan stated that Turkey had ignored his three protocols for negotiation: (a) his terms of health and security, (b) his release, and (c) a peaceful resolution to the Kurdish issue in Turkey. Though the Turkish government had received Öcalan's protocols, they were never released to the public. Öcalan said he would leave the top PKK commanders in charge of the conflict, but that this should not be misinterpreted as a call for the PKK to intensify its armed conflict with Turkey.

In January 2013, peace negotiations between the PKK and the Turkish Government were initiated and from between January and March he met several times with politicians of Peace and Democracy Party (BDP) on Imralı Island. On 21 March, Öcalan declared a ceasefire between the PKK and the Turkish state. Öcalan's statement was read to hundreds of thousands of Kurds in Diyarbakır who had gathered to celebrate the Kurdish New Year (Newroz). The statement said in part, "Let guns be silenced and politics dominate... a new door is being opened from the process of armed conflict to democratization and democratic politics. It's not the end. It's the start of a new era." Soon after Öcalan's declaration, the functional head of the PKK, Murat Karayılan responded by promising to implement a ceasefire. During the peace process, the pro-Kurdish Peoples' Democratic Party (HDP) entered parliament during the parliamentarian election of June 2015. The ceasefire ended following the 2014 Kobanî protests and after two Turkish police officers were killed in Ceylanpınar in July 2015, leading to the 2015–2016 Kurdish–Turkish conflict.

On 27 February 2025, Öcalan issued a message from prison calling for the PKK to hold a congress dissolving itself and lay down its weapons, kicking off the 2025 PKK–Turkey peace process. In response, the PKK announced that it had begun a ceasefire on 1 March. Following the PKK's decision to dissolve itself in May 2025, Öcalan issued a message the following month announcing the end of the PKK insurgency against the Turkish state.

=== Ideological shift ===
Since his incarceration, Öcalan has significantly changed his ideology through exposure to Western social theorists such as Murray Bookchin, Immanuel Wallerstein and Hannah Arendt. Abandoning his old Marxism–Leninist and Stalinist beliefs, Öcalan fashioned his ideal society called democratic confederalism. In early 2004, Öcalan attempted to arrange a meeting with Murray Bookchin through Öcalan's lawyers, describing himself as Bookchin's "student" eager to adapt Bookchin's thought to Middle Eastern society. Bookchin was too ill to meet with Öcalan.

==== Democratic confederalism ====
In March 2005, Öcalan issued the Declaration of Democratic confederalism in Kurdistan calling for a border-free confederation between the Kurdish regions of Southeastern Turkey (called "Northern Kurdistan" by Kurds), Northeast Syria ("Western Kurdistan"), Northern Iraq ("South Kurdistan"), and Northwestern Iran ("East Kurdistan"). In this zone, three bodies of law would be implemented: EU law, Turkish/Syrian/Iraqi/Iranian law and Kurdish law. This proposal was adopted by the PKK programme following the "Refoundation Congress" in April 2005. Öcalan advocated for a Kurdish implementation of Bookchin's The Ecology of Freedom via municipal assemblies as a democratic confederation of Kurdish communities beyond the state borders of Syria, Iran, Iraq, and Turkey. Öcalan promoted a platform of shared values: environmentalism, self-defense, gender equality, and a pluralistic tolerance for religion, politics, and culture. While some of his followers questioned Öcalan's conversion from Marxism-Leninism to social ecology, the PKK adopted Öcalan's proposal and began to form assemblies.

Democratic confederalism, as advocated by the DEM Party, and practiced by the Democratic Union Party (PYD) in the Democratic Autonomous Administration of North and East Syria (DAANES), has been described as a "system of popularly elected administrative councils, allowing local communities to exercise autonomous control over their assets, while linking to other communities via a network of confederal councils." Decisions are made by communes in each neighborhood, village, or city. All are welcome to partake in the communal councils, but political participation is not mandated. There is no private property, but rather "ownership by use, which grants individuals usage rights to the buildings, land, and infrastructure, but not the right to sell and buy on the market or convert them to private enterprises". The economy is in the hands of the communal councils, and is thus (in the words of Bookchin) 'neither collectivised nor privatised - it is common.' Feminism, ecology, and direct democracy are essential in democratic confederalism.

==== Brotherhood of Peoples ====
Parallel to Democratic Confederalism, Öcalan introduced the principle of the Brotherhood of Peoples in 2013, aimed at promoting peaceful coexistence between Kurds and other ethnic groups, similar to the Marxist concept of the friendship of peoples. This idea is enshrined in the preamble of the DAANES: "The struggle and sacrifices of youth in bringing together all components also played a historical role in consolidating and strengthening the Brotherhood of Peoples."

During the 2025 PKK–Turkey peace process, Öcalan repeatedly emphasized the Brotherhood of Peoples, stating that it had "reached a threshold" and referring to a "1000-year-old" historical brotherhood between Kurds and Turks.

==== On women's rights ====
Öcalan is a supporter of the liberation of the women, he writes in his Freedom Manifesto for Women that all slavery is based on the housewifization of women. He deems the woman often as being trapped in a situation where she accepts traditional gender roles and a disadvantaged relationship with a man.

=== Reception of Öcalan's political ideas ===
Although it has received limited attention in mainstream scholarship, some academics have criticized Öcalan's post-imprisonment political shift, particularly his rejection of a Kurdish nation-state and his focus on democratizing the states governing Kurdish populations, as part of Democratic confederalism. In the context of Turkey and the activities of the HDP, and now DEM Party, this approach has been described by as Turkeyification, which critics characterize as a form of voluntary Turkification.

The Middle East Forum described Öcalan's stance in the 2025 PKK–Turkey peace process as paradoxical, noting that the PKK was originally founded in response to the denial of Kurdish existence in Turkey. They argued that the idea of resolving the Kurdish question by working within the same state framework that originally prompted armed resistance is historically "naive" and politically "irresponsible at worst," while Öcalan claims it is a "historical gain."

Öcalan's Brotherhood of Peoples concept has also faced similar criticism. Some commentators have described it as a "project that was born rejected," particularly after Arab tribes defected from the Kurdish-led Syrian Democratic Forces (SDF) during the 2026 northeastern Syria offensive, which may have contributed to the collapse of the DAANES. The Iranian Kurdistan Human Rights Watch criticized the principle, describing it as a "project backed by the Turkish and Syrian intelligence apparatuses" that seeks to "gradually assimilate Kurds into their ruling nations and erase their Kurdish identity."

== Personal life ==
During Öcalan's childhood, his mother, Esma Öcalan (Uveys) was rather dominant and criticised his father, blaming him for their dire economic situation. He later explained in an interview that it was in his childhood he learned to defend himself from injustice. Like many Kurds in Turkey, Öcalan was raised speaking Turkish; according to Amikam Nachmani, lecturer at the Bar-Ilan University in Israel, Öcalan did not know Kurdish when he met him in 1991. Nachmani: "He [Öcalan] told me that he speaks Turkish, gives orders in Turkish, and thinks in Turkish." In 1978 Öcalan married Kesire Yildirim, who he had met at the Ankara University and was of a better household than the regular revolutionaries around Öcalan. They had a difficult marriage with reportedly many disputes and discussions. In 1988, while representing the PKK in Athens, Greece, his wife unsuccessfully attempted to overthrow Öcalan, following which Yildirim went underground.

After his sister Havva was married to a man from another village in an arranged marriage, he felt regret. This event led Öcalan to his policies towards the liberation of women from the traditional suppressed female role. Öcalan's brother Osman became a PKK commander until he defected from the PKK with several others to establish the Patriotic and Democratic Party of Kurdistan. His other brother, Mehmet Öcalan, is a member of the pro-Kurdish Peace and Democracy Party (BDP). Fatma Öcalan is the sister of Abdullah Öcalan and Dilek Öcalan, a former parliamentarian of the HDP, is his niece. Ömer Öcalan, a current member of parliament for the HDP, is his nephew.

== Honorary citizenships ==
Several localities have awarded him with an honorary citizenship:

- Palermo
- Olympia
- Naples
- Castel del Giudice
- Castelbottaccio
- Pinerolo
- Martano
- Reggio Emilia
- Palagonia
- Riace
- Berceto
- Fossalto

== Publications ==
Öcalan is the author of more than 40 books, four of which were written in prison. Many of the notes taken from his weekly meetings with his lawyers have been edited and published. He has also written articles for the newspaper Özgür Gündem which is a newspaper that reported on the Kurdish-Turkish conflict, under the pseudonym of Ali Firat.

=== Books ===
- Interviews and Speeches. London: Kurdistan Solidarity Committee; Kurdistan Information Centre, 1991. 46 p.
- "Translation of his 1999 defense in court". Archived from the original on 20 October 2007.
- Prison Writings: The Roots of Civilisation. London; Ann Arbor, MI: Pluto, 2007. ISBN 978-0-7453-2616-0.
- Prison Writings Volume II: The PKK and the Kurdish Question in the 21st Century. London: Transmedia, 2011. ISBN 978-0-9567514-0-9.
- Democratic Confederalism. London: Transmedia, 2011. ISBN 978-3-941012-47-9.
- Prison Writings III: The Road Map to Negotiations. Cologne: International Initiative, 2012. ISBN 978-3-941012-43-1.
- Liberating life: Women's Revolution. Cologne, Germany: International Initiative Edition, 2013. ISBN 978-3-941012-82-0.
- Manifesto for a Democratic Civilization, Volume 1. Porsgrunn, Norway: New Compass, 2015. ISBN 978-82-93064-42-8.
- Defending a Civilisation.
- The Political Thought of Abdullah Öcalan. London: Pluto Press, 2017. ISBN 978-0-7453-9976-8.
- Manifesto for a Democratic Civilization, Volume 2. Porsgrunn, Norway: New Compass, 2017. ISBN 978-82-93064-48-0

== See also ==
- Kurdistan Free Life Party
- Yalçın Küçük
- Rojava
- PKK
- Kurdistan
