= İmralı =

Turkish prison island in the Sea of Marmara

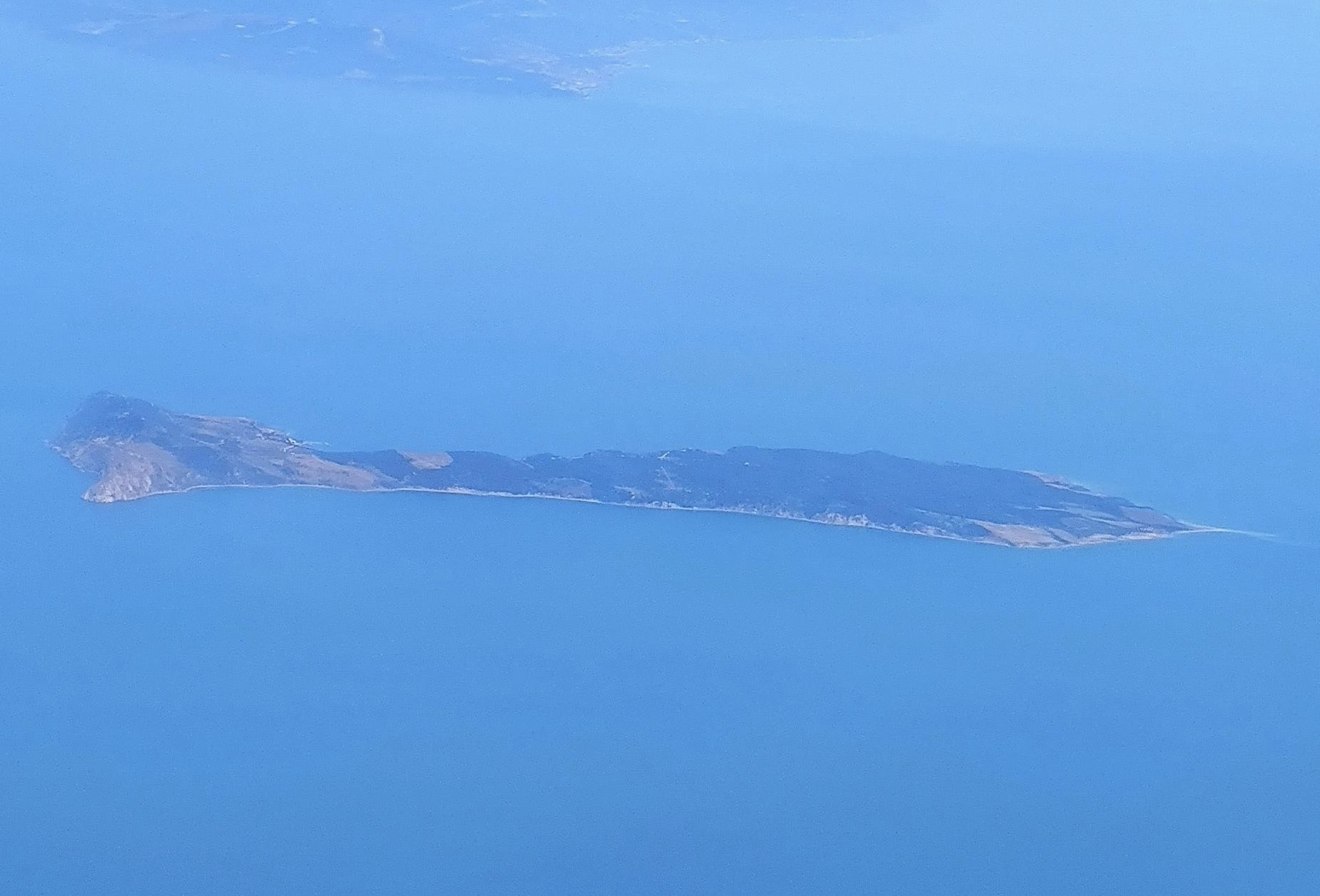
- Western coast of İmralı.

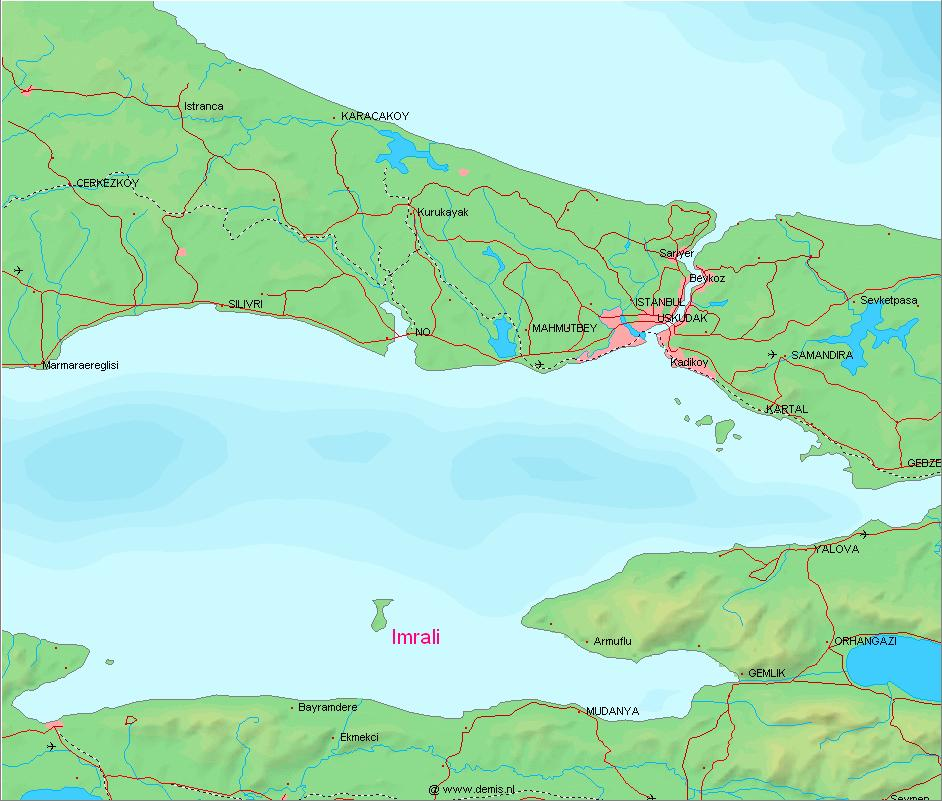

- Location of İmralı within Marmara Region Location of İmralı within Turkey

Geography
- Location: Sea of Marmara
- Coordinates: 40°32′15″N 28°32′06″E
- Area: 9.98 km^{2} (3.85 sq mi)
- Coastline: 19.4 km (12.05 mi)
- Highest elevation: 217 m (712 ft)
- Highest point: Türk Tepesi

Administration
- Turkey
- Region: Marmara region
- Province: Bursa Province
- District: Mudanya

İmralı is a small Turkish prison island in the south of the Sea of Marmara, west of the Armutlu-Bozburun peninsula within Bursa Province. It measures 8 kilometres (5 miles) in the north–south direction with a width of 3 kilometres (2 miles), and has an area of 9.98 square kilometres (3.85 sq mi). The highest peak is Türk Tepesi at an altitude of 217 metres (712 feet) above sea level. It is prohibited to fly over it or fish near its shores.

== Myth ==
According to the legend, the island was created by Persephone and was named either after a giant or after a Pelasgian settler; the name was Besbikos/Besbicus (Βέσβικος). According to the story, the Giants tore off large sections of coastline and dragged them through the sea. Their plan was to block the mouth of the river Rhyndakos with these massive rock formations. However, Persephone, in order to protect Cyzicus, anchored these rocks to the seabed instead, causing them to become fixed in place and form an island. On the island, the settler named Besbikos, together with Heracles, fought and killed the remaining Giants.

== History ==
In antiquity, it was a member of the Delian League since it appears in tribute records of Athens between 434/3 and 418/7 BCE. During the ancient times the island was called Besbicus (Ancient Greek: Βέσβικος), while in Mediaeval times, it was known as Calonymus (Greek: Καλώνυμος).

The Turkish name İmralı derives from the name of the island's conqueror, Emir Ali, one of the first Ottoman admirals. In 1308 İmralı became the first island to be conquered by the newly established Ottoman Navy. Its strategic location enabled the Ottomans to control the movement of ships in the Sea of Marmara with a naval base established on it, cutting the Byzantine Empire's connection to Bursa. The island is also referred as "Mir Ali" in Ottoman documents. The island was also a place of refuge for the runaways of the Devshirme System. For example in 1567, a group of runaways was protected and hidden by the locals of Mir Ali Island while the batches of children were being transported from the port of Dutlimanı in Bandırma.

In 1913, the island had 250 houses, a school, three monasteries, and 1,200 residents, all of whom were Greeks. The economic activity of the island's residents consisted mainly of fishing and farming onions, with most of the grown onions sold to Istanbul. There were three Greek villages on the island, engaged mostly in growing grapes, winemaking, silk production and fishing, until the Turkish War of Independence (1919–1923). One well-known islander was Kimon Friar who emigrated to the United States and became a scholar and translator of Greek language poetry. The island was depopulated by the 1923 forced population exchange between Greece and Turkey and remained uninhabited for thirteen years.

In 1936, the Turkish government opened a newly semi-open prison, where the prisoners earned money by working in agriculture and fishing. Following the 1960 Turkish coup d'état, the deposed Prime Minister Adnan Menderes was imprisoned, tortured, and executed on the island. From 1999 until 2009, the now-maximum-security prison housed a single inmate, Abdullah Öcalan, the leader of the PKK. All the other prisoners on the island had been transferred to mainland Turkey. In November 2009, several other prisoners, including four members of the PKK and one TKP/ML, were transferred to a newly constructed building.

There is now a military base on the island and the surrounding area is a forbidden zone.

== Sources ==
- (in Turkish) Brief history
- (in Turkish) On the island
- (in Turkish) Brief history
- (in Turkish) About the name of the island
