= Osman Öcalan =

Kurdish military commander (1958–2021)

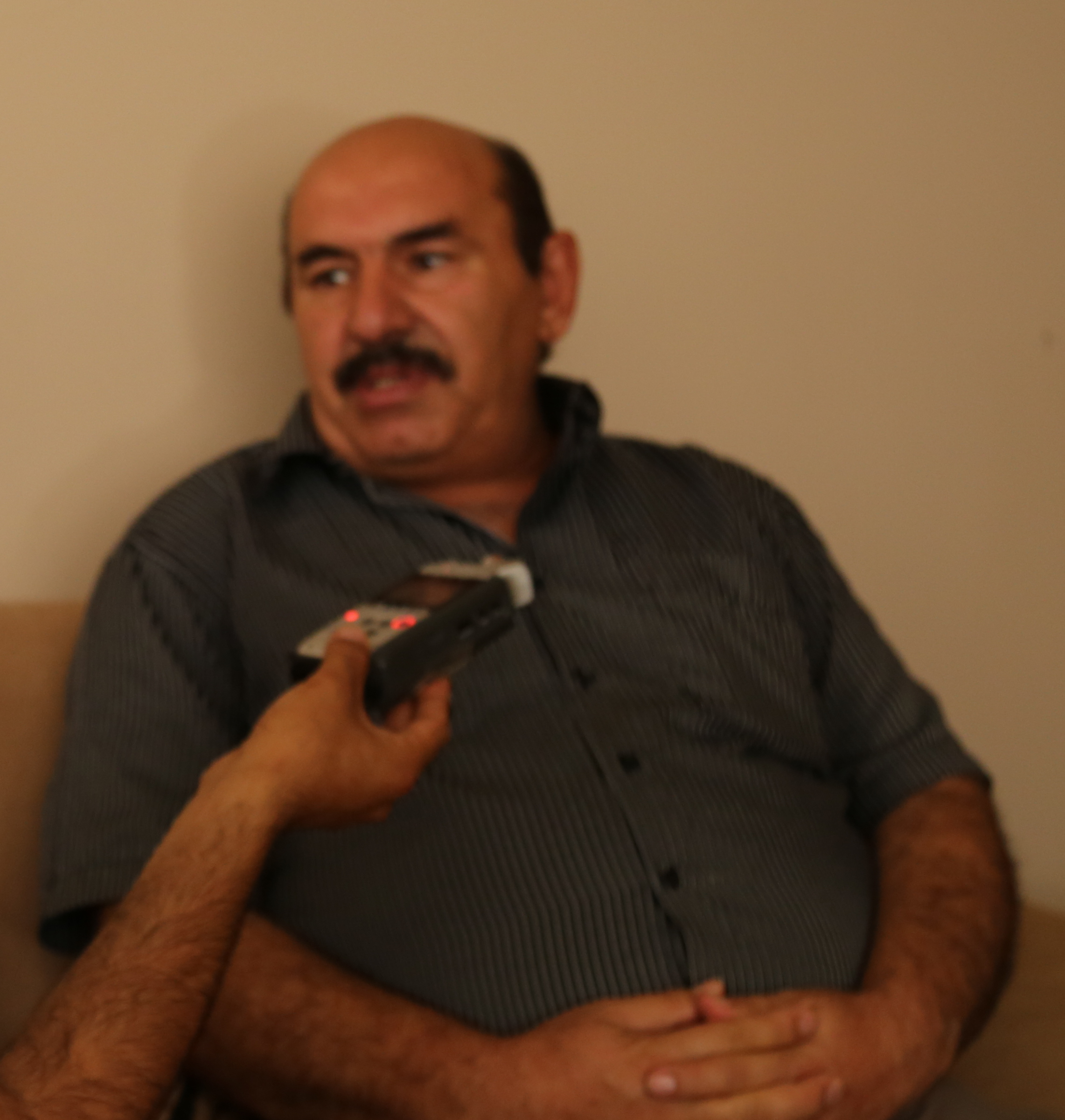
- Born: 14 August 1958; Ömerli, Şanlıurfa, Turkey
- Died: 15 November 2021 (aged 63); Erbil, Kurdistan Region, Iraq
- Military career
- Allegiance: Kurdistan Workers' Party (PKK) (until 2004); Patriotic Democratic Party (PWD)
- Service years: 1978–2004
- Rank: Military commander in Iraqi Kurdistan
- Nickname: Ferhat
- Conflicts: Kurdish–Turkish conflict

Osman Öcalan (14 August 1958 – 15 November 2021) was a Kurdish militant and ex-commander of the Kurdistan Workers' Party.

== Biography ==
The younger brother of Abdullah Öcalan, Osman studied at teachers' training college before joining the PKK when it was founded in 1978 and spent two years in Libya.

=== Career with the PKK ===
He joined the central committee in 1986, and the executive committee in the 1990s, becoming virtually second in command of the PKK. But in 1992, after signing a truce with the two main Iraqi Kurdish parties, the KDP and the PUK, he suffered disgrace and was jailed by the PKK.

"In June 1993, they removed all my powers", he told The Middle East in an interview. "I was isolated in a cell for three months and interrogated for 52 days before being tried in February 1995. The trial lasted only one day. I was warned that if I continued to defend my ideas, I would be executed. If not, I would be pardoned. A lawyer? Out of the question. The trial was conducted under the law of the mountain".

In 1994, he left the PKK in order to marry a fellow PKK fighter. The PKK forbids relationships between its guerillas. He later rejoined the PKK. At the seventh congress of the PKK, he advocated for the PKK to lay down arms and change the PKK's name into People's Legitimate Defense Force. Later he also suggested the PKK to lay down their arms in order to enable Turkey and the European Union to begin negotiations with the group. In 2000 The Independent referred to him as a "senior commander" of the PKK when Medya TV, the underground Kurdish satellite television channel reported him as claiming that the Turkish authorities wanted his brother to die.

In March 2003, in an interview with western journalists from his refuge in the Qandil mountains, he asserted "We will never allow ourselves to be disarmed as long as the Kurdish issue is not settled".

=== Split from the PKK ===
He split away from the PKK again in August 2004 to form the Patriotic Democratic Party (Kurdish: Partîya Welatparêzên Demokratên; PWD) with Hikmet Fidan, after a lost power struggle with Murat Karayılan and Cemal Bayık. But the PWD was short-lived, did not become an important party, and after Fidan was assassinated in Diyarbakir in July 2005, the PWD merged with the Democratic People's Party (DEHAP).

In November 2007, in an interview in Erbil, he claimed that the PKK were retreating from Iraq into Iran. He estimated the total strength of the PKK guerrillas at just under 7,000. "There are 2,750 fighters in Turkey", he said. "A further 2,500 are in the border areas of Iraq and 1,500 are in Iran ... In the last six months the PKK has started a war against Iran". Speaking from his home in Koya in Iraqi Kurdistan, he claimed that Turkey was denying medical treatment to his brother Abdullah Ocalan and warned that suicide bombers would strike Turkish cities if he died in prison. Today's Zaman, referring to him as a "former PKK leader", quoted him as saying "For 20 years I was part of the struggle; but because of ideological differences, I pulled out of it. Now I am with armed fighters who defend themselves, but am against the PKK".

=== Ergenekon allegations ===
In August 2009, Hurriyet reported that Abdullah Öcalan had produced a 125-page petition in which he suggested that his brother Osman be investigated for his links to Ergenekon.

=== TRT Kurdî interview ===
While evaluating the 2019 Istanbul mayoral elections for TRT Kurdî, Öcalan said, "Ekrem İmamoğlu did not give a serious message for the Kurds. He fled from the Kurds as much as he could and tried to keep himself independent from them. The CHP has no project for the Kurds" and "The CHP is not close to the Kurds... ...They did not take the Kurds seriously and did not even take them into account". With his statements, he implied that the Kurds would support Abdullah Öcalan.

It was thought by the public and some news organizations that Öcalan was wanted with a red notice at the time of the TRT Kurdî's interview. However, it was later revealed that Öcalan was not officially wanted by Turkey nor Interpol. Recep Tayyip Erdoğan, President of the Republic of Turkey, made a statement regarding the interview as "I don't know that Osman Öcalan is wanted with a red notice."

=== Death ===
Öcalan died from COVID-19 in Erbil on 15 November 2021, during the COVID-19 pandemic in Iraq. He was 63 years old.
