= 1993 alleged Turkish military coup =

Alleged coup attempt in Turkey

According to some sources, there was a coup d'état in 1993 in Turkey, allegedly organised and carried out by elements of the Turkish military through covert means. Although the early 1990s were a period of great violence in Turkey due to the Kurdish-Turkish conflict, 1993 saw a series of suspicious deaths: of President Turgut Özal, leading military figures, and journalists. Particularly in the context of the Ergenekon trials from 2008 onwards and related investigations into the Turkish deep state and the suspicious deaths from this period, claims of a "covert coup" intended to prevent a peace settlement (and to protect the covert relationships between the Turkish military, intelligence services including JITEM, Counter-Guerrilla, certain Kurdish groups including Kurdish Hizbollah, and the Turkish mafia) have been made.

Fikri Sağlar, a former member of the parliamentary commission which investigated the Susurluk scandal which first began to shed light on the Turkish deep state, is one who has made such claims, describing "a covert military coup". Former PKK commander Şemdin Sakık has described an Ergenekon organization-linked group named the Doğu Çalışma Grubu, holding it responsible for assassinations including those of Turkish Gendarmerie General Commander Eşref Bitlis (17 February), President Turgut Özal (17 April), General Bahtiyar Aydın (22 October) and former Major Cem Ersever (4 November). In addition to the assassination of key figures supporting a peace process, several massacres took place in 1993, which it is claimed were intended as part of an alleged "strategy of tension". These include the May 24, 1993, PKK ambush and the Sivas and Başbağlar massacres in early July.

== Overview ==
In the early 1990s, President Turgut Özal agreed to negotiations with the Kurdistan Workers Party (PKK), the events of the 1991 Gulf War having changed some of the geopolitical dynamics in the region. Apart from Özal, himself half-Kurdish, few Turkish politicians were interested in a peace process, nor was he more than a part of the PKK itself. In 1993, Özal was working on the peace plans with former finance minister Adnan Kahveci and General Commander of the Turkish Gendarmerie Eşref Bitlis. Negotiations led to a cease-fire declaration by the PKK on 20 March 1993—by which time Kahveci and Bitlis were dead.

With the PKK's ceasefire declaration in hand, Özal was planning to propose a major pro-Kurdish reform package at the next meeting of the National Security Council. The president's death on 17 April led to the postponement of that meeting, and the plans were never presented. A month later, the May 24, 1993, PKK ambush ensured the end of the peace process. Former PKK commander Şemdin Sakık maintains the attack was part of the Doğu Çalışma Grubu's coup plans. Under the new Presidency of Süleyman Demirel and Premiership of Tansu Çiller, the Castle Plan (to use any and all means to solve the Kurdish question using violence), which Özal had opposed, was enacted, and the peace process abandoned. Further massacres (notably the Sivas massacre and Başbağlar massacre in early July) and assassinations ensured that the peace process was well and truly buried.

== Alleged incidents ==
- January 24th: Assassination of journalist Uğur Mumcu via car bomb
- February 5th: Assassination of politician and Turgut Özal confidante Adnan Kahveci, via a suspicious car accident
- February 17th: Assassination of General Commander of the Turkish Gendarmerie Eşref Bitlis, allegedly sabotaged plane
- April 17th: Assassination of President Turgut Özal, allegedly by poison
- May 24th: PKK ambush
- June 30th: Arson attack on hotel in Van
- July 2nd: Sivas massacre
- July 5th: Başbağlar massacre
- July 18th: Van massacre
- September 4th: Assassination of Kurdish deputy Mehmet Sincar
- October 22nd: Assassination of General Bahtiyar Aydın
- November 4th: Assassination of former Major Cem Ersever

== Investigations ==
Former General Levent Ersöz, who was head of JITEM and is considered a key suspect in the Ergenekon trials, was charged in 2013 with having had a role in the 1993 death of President Turgut Özal.

== See also ==
- Politics of Turkey
- Deep state in Turkey
- Conspiracy theories in Turkey
