= East Working Group =

Secret association within the Turkish military

The Eastern Working Group (Turkish: Doğu Çalışma Grubu) was an alleged group within the Turkish military said to be linked to the Ergenekon organization, and possibly organised within the Turkish Gendarmerie's JITEM. According to former PKK commander Şemdin Sakık, the group was formed in 1993 and carried out a number of assassinations in preparation for the 1993 alleged Turkish military coup.

According to Sakık, these assassinations included (in 1993) President Turgut Özal, former Major Cem Ersever, former Turkish Gendarmerie general commander Eşref Bitlis and General Bahtiyar Aydın. Turgut Özal died in office on 17 April 1993 in suspicious circumstances and few and a month later the 24 May 1993, PKK ambush took place, breaking the peace process which Özal had led. Sakık maintains the attack was part of the DÇG's coup plans.

Şemdin Sakık also ascribes the death of Colonel Rıdvan Özden (1995) to the DÇG.

== See also ==
- Batı Çalışma Grubu
- 1997 military memorandum
- Castle Plan
- Susurluk scandal
