= List of monuments and memorials to the Kurdistan Workers' Party insurgency =

Since 1978, the conflict between Republic of Turkey and various Kurdish insurgent groups, especially Kurdistan Workers' Party (PKK) caused deaths of 40,000 to 55,000 people from both sides including many civilians. Many monuments and memorials for the military and civilian casualties of the conflict were established by the Turkish government. The list below lists all memorials dedicated to victims of the conflict. For military cemeteries see List of military cemeteries to the Kurdish–Turkish conflict

== List ==
Name	Image	Location	Established	Number of graves	Notes	References
33 Martyrs Memorial		Bingöl Province	24 May 2012	0	Dedicated to 33 unarmed recruits killed by PKK militants in an ambush on 24 May 1993.	
Acemoğlu Bridge Martyrs Memorial		Kemah, Erzincan Province	1996	0	Dedicated to 14 soldiers who died in a road accident in Acemoğlu bridge when they were going to fight in an ambush against PKK militias.	
Keşan Military Memorial		Keşan, Edirne Province	1957	21	For 6 soldiers who died in the Turkish War of Independence, 2 soldiers died in the Turkish Invasion of Cyprus and 13 soldiers died in Kurdish–Turkish conflict.	
Kocaeli Military Memorial		İzmit, Kocaeli Province	1924	137	It was originally established for soldiers who died in Turkish War of Independence and later expanded for soldiers who died in Kurdish–Turkish conflict.	
Köprüköy Military Memorial		Köprüköy, Erzurum Province	1964	Unknown	It was originally established for soldiers who died in Russo-Turkish War of 1877–1878 and World War I and later expanded for 2 soldiers who died in Kurdish–Turkish conflict.	
Monument of the Martyrs of Internal Security		Kırklartepe, Erzincan, Erzincan Province	1997	1887	For 1887 Turkish troops under the Third Army killed by PKK militias.	
Roboski airstrike memorial		Diyarbakır, Diyarbakır Province	2013	0	For the victims killed by the Turkish air-force in the Roboski airstrike. The memorial was dismantled by the state-appointed trustee of Diyarbakır, Cuma Attila	
Siverek Military Memorial and Cemetery		Siverek, Şanlıurfa Province	1 July 2001	1	It was originally established as a memorial for tens of soldiers who died in the Russo-Turkish War of 1877–1878, Turkish War of Independence, Korean War and Kurdish–Turkish conflict. A soldier who died in Kurdish–Turkish conflict was buried later.	
Uşak Military Memorial and Cemetery		Uşak, Uşak Province	1995	3	3 soldiers who died in Kurdish–Turkish conflict are buried in the cemetery and a representative memorial for 59 other soldiers who died in Kurdish–Turkish conflict also exists.	
