= Castle Plan =

Turkish government plan against the Kurdistan Workers' Party

- Part of the Kurdish–Turkish conflict
Location	Turkey

Belligerents
Turkey; JITEM, Special Forces Command, Police Special Operation Teams, Village guards and others	PKK

The Castle Plan (Turkish: Kale Planı) was a Turkish government plan to widen the range of means used to fight the Kurdistan Workers' Party (PKK). This included using the resources of the Counter-Guerrilla, such as the Grey Wolves, as well as police and army units such as JITEM and the Special Forces Command, to assassinate PKK members and supporters.

The plan was approved by the National Security Council under President Turgut Özal and Prime Minister Süleyman Demirel, but not put into effect immediately due to the opposition of Özal and Eşref Bitlis, the Commander of the Gendarmerie of Turkey. Özal in particular favoured attempts to move forward the peace process, which produced the PKK's first cease-fire declaration on 20 March 1993. Eşref Bitlis died in a suspicious plane crash on 17 February 1993, and Özal died on 17 April 1993 in suspicious circumstances, leading to the postponement of a meeting of the National Security Council at which he was planning to propose a major pro-Kurdish reform package. A month later the May 24, 1993 PKK ambush ensured the end of the peace process. Former PKK commander Şemdin Sakık maintains the attack was part of the Doğu Çalışma Grubu's coup plans. The Castle Plan was put into effect after Tansu Çiller became Prime Minister on 25 June 1993.

Victims of the plan included the Democracy Party (DEP) (which was dissolved, in a move later judged illegal by the ECHR) and the assassination of a number of PKK-supporting business figures. Tansu Çiller declared on 4 October 1993: "We know the list of businessmen and artists subjected to racketeering by the PKK and we shall be bringing their members to account." Beginning on 14 January 1994, almost a hundred people were kidnapped by commandos wearing uniforms and traveling in police vehicles and then killed somewhere along the road from Ankara to Istanbul. The infamous Grey Wolves member Abdullah Çatlı demanded money from people who were on "Çiller’s list", promising to get their names removed. One of his victims, Behçet Cantürk, was to pay ten million dollars, to which Casino King Ömer Lütfü Topal added a further seventeen million. However, after receiving the money, he then went on to have them kidnapped and killed, and sometimes tortured beforehand. The Kurdish Hizbollah also became more active against the PKK, with the support of police and military training.

The 1996 Susurluk car crash exposed some of the workings of the Castle Plan, and led to the Susurluk scandal as some of the connections between the police, armed forces and the mafia were exposed.

== See also ==
- Ayhan Çarkın
- Musa Anter
- Uğur Mumcu
- 1993 alleged Turkish military coup
