= Arif Doğan =

Turkish Gendarmerie commander

Personal details
- Born: 1945 Kırıkhan, Turkey
- Died: 17 October 2014 (aged 68–69)

Military service
- Allegiance: Turkey
- Branch/service: Turkish Army
- Rank: Colonel

Arif Doğan (born Kırıkhan, Hatay Province, 1945 – 17 October 2014) was a commander in the Turkish Gendarmerie, and said to be one of the founders of the Gendarmerie's JITEM intelligence unit. He was a defendant in the Ergenekon trials, and in August 2013 was sentenced to 47 years in prison. He has stated in court that he founded JITEM in the late 1980s on the orders of Gendarmerie Commander Gen. Burhanettin Bigalı, with the approval of the Chief of Staff (Necip Torumtay) and of the Interior Ministry, and transferred control to Veli Küçük in 1990. He had previously claimed to have founded JITEM on his own initiative, and to have "frozen" it in 1990.

In 2010 a voice recording said to be of Doğan was anonymously posted online, in which Doğan said he had ordered the deaths of Eşref Bitlis and Cem Ersever, referring to the death of Bitlis (in a suspicious plane crash) as an "assassination". JITEM informant Abdülkadir Aygan said that this was true. Doğan said that the voice in the recording was his, but said the recordings had been spliced to incriminate him.

On 17 January 2011 Doğan, while testifying in court in the Ergenekon case, declared that he set up Kurdish Hizbollah as a contra group to fight and kill militants of the Kurdistan Workers' Party (PKK). The organization was originally to be called Hizbul-Kontr ("Party of the Contras").
