= Bahtiyar Aydın =

Turkish general and regional commander

Personal details
- Born: 1946 Piraziz, Turkey
- Died: 22 October 1993 (aged 46–47) Lice, Diyarbakır

Military service
- Allegiance: Turkey
- Branch/service: Turkish Army
- Years of service: 1965–1993
- Rank: Brigadier-General

Bahtiyar Aydın (1946 – 22 October 1993) was a Turkish general. He was a regional commander in the Turkish Gendarmerie in Lice, Turkey in southeastern Turkey when he was assassinated by a sniper using a Kanas rifle. Officially a victim of the Kurdistan Workers' Party (PKK) (which denied responsibility), his death has long been considered suspicious. He was said to have "close relations with the public" and not to approve of the extrajudicial violence which was commonly used by the Turkish military in south-eastern Turkey at the time.

== Response to assassination ==
According to former PKK commander Şemdin Sakık, Aydın was one of those assassinated by the Doğu Çalışma Grubu, an alleged group within the Turkish military said to be linked to the Ergenekon organization. Other witnesses to the Ergenekon trials have also said that Aydın was assassinated by Ergenekon - possibly by PKK informants working with JITEM. Aydın was one of those who believed the "Kurdish question" could not be solved by force, and needed a peaceful solution with economic and social measures. In 2013 Diyarbakir prosecutors asked the local Gendarmerie for the original 1994 document allegedly containing testimony from an unnamed PKK suspect admitting to the assassination of Aydın. The Gendarmerie said that no such document or testimony could be found in its records, although a copy of part of the alleged testimony had been sent to a parliamentary commission in 1994. In October 2013 a prosecutor indicted two retired military officers, saying that there was no evidence of PKK involvement.
