= List of military cemeteries to the Kurdistan Workers' Party insurgency =

Since 1978, the conflict between Republic of Turkey and various Kurdish insurgent groups, especially Kurdistan Workers' Party (PKK) caused deaths of 40,000 to 55,000 people from both sides including many civilians. Many military cemeteries for the military casualties of the conflict was established by the Turkish government. The list below lists all military cemeteries for the soldiers who died in the conflict. Military cemeteries that originally wasn't established for Kurdish–Turkish conflict casualties but later expanded in a way to include Kurdish–Turkish conflict casualties are included in this list. For monuments and memorials see List of monuments and memorials to the Kurdish–Turkish conflict

== List ==
Name	Image	Location	Established	Number of graves	Notes	References
Akhisar Battalion Military Cemetery		Akhisar, Manisa Province	1986	10	For 10 soldiers died in the conflict in different locations and dates.	
Artilleryman Battalion Military Cemetery		Aşkale, Erzurum Province	29 October 1998	14	For 14 soldiers who died in a road accident in Acemoğlu bridge when they were going to fight in an ambush against PKK militias.	
Aşkale Military Cemetery		Aşkale, Erzurum Province	1995	Unknown	For several soldiers who died in 1963 because of accidents and 2 other soldiers killed by PKK militias in 1995 and 2003.	
Niğde Battalion Military Cemetery		Niğde, Niğde Province	1995	13	For 13 soldiers died in the conflict in different locations and dates.	
Bafra Battalion Military Cemetery		Bafra, Samsun Province	1998	7	For 7 soldiers died in the conflict in different locations and dates.	
Burdur Military Cemetery		Burdur, Burdur Province	2008	196	For 196 Turkish troops killed in World War I, Turkish War of Independence, Korean War, Turkish Invasion of Cyprus and Kurdish–Turkish conflict.	
Düzce Military Cemetery		Elmalık, Düzce, Düzce Province	30 April 1997	4	For 4 soldiers died in the conflict in different locations and dates between 1997 and 2002.	
Gebze Military Cemetery		Gebze, Kocaeli Province	1997	19	For 19 soldiers including 3 high ranked ones died in the conflict in different locations and dates between 1992 and 2008.	
İcadiye Military Cemetery		Elazığ, Elazığ Province	1971	29	It was originally established for soldiers who died in Sheikh Said Rebellion and later expanded for soldiers who died in Turkish Invasion of Cyprus and Kurdish–Turkish conflict.	
Keşan Military Memorial		Keşan, Edirne Province	1957	21	For 6 soldiers who died in the Turkish War of Independence, 2 soldiers died in the Turkish Invasion of Cyprus and 13 soldiers died in Kurdish–Turkish conflict.	
Kızderbent Military Cemetery		Karamürsel, Kocaeli Province	Unknown	1	For an unnamed soldier died in the conflict.	
Kızıltepe Military Cemetery		Kızıltepe, Mardin Province	1997	0	Dedicated to 232 soldiers, 59 police forces, 40 village guards and 19 teachers died in region with connection to the Kurdish–Turkish conflict..	
Kocaeli Military Memorial		İzmit, Kocaeli Province	1924	137	It was originally established for soldiers who died in Turkish War of Independence and later expanded for soldiers who died in Kurdish–Turkish conflict.	
Köprüköy Military Memorial		Köprüköy, Erzurum Province	1964	Unknown	It was originally established for soldiers who died in Russo-Turkish War of 1877–1878 and World War I and later expanded for 2 soldiers who died in Kurdish–Turkish conflict.	
Körfez Battalion Military Cemetery		Körfez, Kocaeli Province	2003	9	For 9 soldiers died in the conflict in different locations and dates.	
Malatya Battalion Military Cemetery		Malatya, Malatya Province	1995	60	For 60 soldiers, police forces, workers and teachers died in Kurdish–Turkish conflict.	
Menemen Military Cemetery		Menemen, İzmir Province	1998	8	For 8 soldiers died in the conflict in different locations and dates.	
Monument of the Martyrs of Internal Security		Kırklartepe, Erzincan, Erzincan Province	1997	1887	For 1887 Turkish troops under the Third Army killed by PKK militias.	
Seferihisar Military Cemetery		Seferihisar, İzmir Province	21 May 1993	8	For 8 soldiers died in the conflict in different locations and dates.	
Siverek Military Memorial and Cemetery		Siverek, Şanlıurfa Province	1 July 2001	1	It was originally established as a memorial for tens of soldiers who died in the Russo-Turkish War of 1877–1878, Turkish War of Independence, Korean War and Kurdish–Turkish conflict. A soldier who died in Kurdish–Turkish conflict was buried later.	
Şarkışla Military Cemetery		Şarkışla, Sivas	2005	1	For Commando Oğuz Balıkçı who died in Kurdish–Turkish conflict.	
Tekirdağ Military Cemetery		Marmara Ereğlisi, Tekirdağ	1994	2	For 2 soldiers died in the conflict in different locations and dates.	
Uşak Military Memorial and Cemetery		Uşak, Uşak Province	1995	3	3 soldiers who died in Kurdish–Turkish conflict are buried in the cemetery and a representative memorial for 59 other soldiers who died in Kurdish–Turkish conflict also exists.	
Uzunköprü Military Cemetery		Uzunköprü, Edirne Province	1912	150+	It was originally established for soldiers died in Balkan Wars, it was later expanded for soldiers who died in Gallipoli campaign, Turkish War of Independence and Kurdish–Turkish conflict.	
