= Sırrı Sakık =

Turkish politician

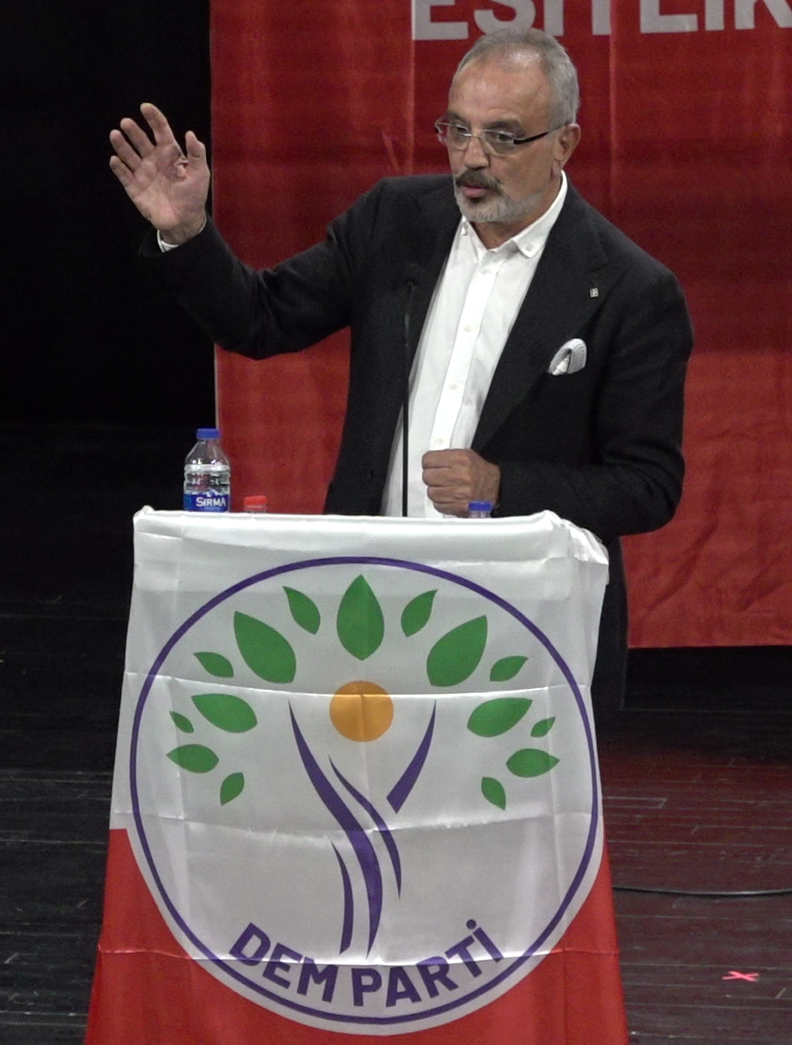

Member of Parliament
- In office 1991–1994
- Parliamentary group: SHP; DEP
- Constituency: Muş

Member of Parliament
- In office 2007–2011
- Parliamentary group: DTP
- Constituency: Muş

Member of Parliament
- In office 2011–2014
- Parliamentary group: BDP
- Constituency: Muş

Personal details
- Born: 1 August 1957 (age 69) Yörecik, Muş
- Spouse: Mehtap Sakık
- Children: 2
- Relatives: Şemdin Sakık (brother)

Sırrı Sakık (born 1 August 1957, Yörecik, Muş Province, Turkey) is a Turkish-Kurdish journalist and politician. He is a member of the Grand National Assembly of Turkey and Mayor of Ağrı.

He was elected in the 2023 Turkish parliamentary election.

== Background ==
Sakık is the brother of former Kurdistan Workers' Party (PKK) commander Şemdin Sakık. Şemdin took part in and was responsible for the 1993 Bingöl massacre. Many brothers and a sister were PKK fighters His brother Abdulsamet Sakık, a Democracy Party (DEP) politician who was the party's chair in Gaziantep, was assassinated on 2 October 1993. Sakık was involved in the tourism sector and was also a journalist for Cumhuriyet and Vatan.

== Political career ==
Sakık was first elected to the Grand National Assembly of Turkey in 1991 on a ticket of the Social Democratic People's Party (SHP). He was a founding member of the Democracy Party (DEP) in 1993, and was one of the DEP deputies sentenced in 1994 to 15 years in prison for links with Kurdish militants, after their parliamentary immunity was revoked. He was later released, and played a role in the People's Democracy Party (HADEP), being arrested after a 1996 incident in which masked men dropped the Turkish flag at its party congress and raised the PKK flag (Sakık had walked out in protest, but later said all flags should be respected).

He was a founding member of the Democratic Society Party (DTP) in 2005 and entered parliament again in 2007, technically running as an independent. He was deputy chairman of the DTP.

He was re-elected in 2011 for the Peace and Democracy Party (BDP) (again, technically as an independent), after the DTP was banned in 2009. In 2012 he displayed a bullet in parliament, which he said had been sent to him as a death threat. On 15 September 2012 his son Sedar Sakık committed suicide by jumping from the balcony of his house. In the 2014 local elections he was elected as mayor of Ağrı. In March 2017 he was suspended from his office as Mayor by the Turkish Minister of the Interior. A trustee was appointed instead for Ağrı Municipality.

== Political positions ==
He supported women's participation in politics and opposed the electoral process which included a 10% threshold for parties which forced politicians of the DTP to present themselves as independent candidates. He also supported a Kurdish participation in a political and democratic environment.
