= Burhanettin Bigalı =

Turkish general

General Commander of the Gendarmerie of Turkey
- In office 23 August 1988 – 30 August 1990
- Preceded by: Adnan Doğu
- Succeeded by: Eşref Bitlis

Head of the National Intelligence Organization
- In office 7 September 1981 – 14 August 1986
- President: Kenan Evren
- Preceded by: Bülent Türker
- Succeeded by: Hayri Ündül

Personal details
- Born: 1927 Istanbul
- Died: 17 September 2016 (aged 88–89)
- Education: Turkish Military Academy

Military service
- Allegiance: Turkey
- Branch/service: Turkish Land Forces
- Years of service: 1948–1990
- Rank: General
- Battles/wars: Korean War

Burhanettin Bigalı (1927 – 17 September 2016) was a Turkish general; he retired in 1990. He was head of the National Intelligence Organization (1981–1986) and later General Commander of the Gendarmerie of Turkey (1988– 1990).

He was born in 1927 in Dereköy, Biga, Çanakkale. He belongs to the Chundyshk (Цундышк) dynasty of the Circassians.

Arif Doğan has claimed in court that he founded the Gendarmerie's JITEM in the late 1980s on the orders of Bigalı, with the approval of the Chief of Staff and of the Interior Ministry.
