= Yalım =

- Gender: Male

Origin
- Language: Turkish
- Meaning: Blade, Flame, Sky Glow

Yalım is a common Turkish given name. In Turkish, "Yalım" means "Blaze", "Flame", and/or "Sky Glow".

== Real People ==
- Yalım Erez, politician in Tansu Çiller's government.
