= Özer Uçuran Çiller =

Turkish engineer and businessman (1937–2024)

- Born: Özer Uçuran; 21 September 1937; Kadıköy, Istanbul, Turkey
- Died: 1 June 2024 (aged 86); Sarıyer, Istanbul, Turkey
- Resting place: Kilyos Cemetery, Istanbul
- Education: Robert College
- Occupations: Engineer, businessman
- Spouse: Tansu Çiller (m. 1963)
- Children: 2

Özer Uçuran Çiller (21 September 1937 – 1 June 2024) was a Turkish engineer and businessperson. He was married to Tansu Çiller, one of Turkey's former prime ministers, and was the father of two children. He took the surname "Çiller" after his marriage.

== Life ==
Özer Uçuran was born on 21 September 1937, in Caddebostan. His father Ramiz Uçuran and mother İsmet Uçuran were from Mudanya. Ramiz Uçuran took this surname because he drove fast while working as a dolmuş driver. He began working as the private driver of businessman Mustafa İpekçi. When İpekçi moved to Istanbul, he took the Uçuran family with him. Ramiz Uçuran later left driving and became the first and 30-year muhtar of Caddebostan. Through Mustafa İpekçi, Özer Uçuran enrolled at Saint Joseph French High School. He later studied engineering and advanced engineering at Robert College (Boğaziçi University).

He married Tansu Çiller, whom he met at a university reception in 1963. When Tansu Çiller went to the United States for education, she took Özer Çiller with her and found him a job. In the United States, he earned MBA degrees from Boston and Connecticut universities. Until 1975, he served as Director of Economic Controls at Amatek Inc.

After staying in the United States for eight years, he returned to Turkey at the invitation of Mehmet Emin Karamehmet. He served as CEO of Çukurova Holding under Karamehmet. In 1981, he founded Marsan Marmara Holding together with his wife Tansu Çiller. He also worked as a columnist for the newspapers Milliyet and Güneş, through the intermediary of Nazlı Ilıcak. He was appointed general manager of İstanbul Bank. The bank later announced that it had gone bankrupt.

After his wife Tansu Çiller entered politics and became Turkey's first female prime minister in 1993, he became Turkey's first "second gentleman". Beginning in the early 2000s, Özer Çiller became interested in alternative medicine and had books published on the subject. Çiller died at the age of 86 on 1 June 2024, due to kidney failure, in Istanbul's Sarıyer district. His funeral prayer was performed after the noon prayer at the Barbaros Hayrettin Pasha Mosque in Levent, and he was buried at Kilyos Cemetery. At the funeral ceremony, Özer Çiller's wife, former prime minister Tansu Çiller, and their sons Mert and Berk Çiller received condolences. Tansu Çiller shook hands with and accepted condolences from all citizens who came to offer their condolences and were outside the protocol.

The funeral ceremony was attended by President Recep Tayyip Erdoğan, Minister of Family and Social Services Mahinur Özdemir Göktaş, Deputy Speaker of the Grand National Assembly of Turkey Celal Adan, Chairman of the Foreign Affairs Committee of the Grand National Assembly of Turkey Fuat Oktay, Murat Kurum, Presidential Chief Advisor on Security and Foreign Policy Akif Çağatay Kılıç, Democratic Party Chairman Gültekin Uysal, former interior ministers Mehmet Ağar and Süleyman Soylu, former İYİ Party Chairman Meral Akşener, former Vice President Fuat Oktay, former DYP ministers Yaman Törüner, Hakan Ekinci, Istanbul Governor Davut Gül, Istanbul Chief Public Prosecutor Şaban Yılmaz, Istanbul Police Chief Zafer Aktaş, Bülent Eczacıbaşı, former Galatasaray Club President Faruk Süren, and many citizens.

== Works ==
Year	Work	Publication	Source	ISBN
1994	Mutlu ve Başarılı Olma Sanatı	İnkılâp Kitabevi		ISBN 9789751001610
2005	Pencere, Yeniçağ'da Düşünce Gücü ve Holistik Sağlığa Açılan Pencere (Ciltli)	Truva Yayınları, Mayıs 2005		ISBN 9799756237402
2008	Sırrın Sırrı	Doğan Kitap		ISBN 9786051110721
2010	Yazgı	Doğan Kitap		ISBN 9786051114644
2011	İnfoteizm	Doğan Kitap		ISBN 978-6051119557
2011	Mutlu Huzurlu Başarılı Olabilme Sanatı	Doğan Kitap		ISBN 9786050904116
2012	Düşüncenin Simyacılığı	Doğan Kitap		ISBN 9786050909371
2014	Tanrı Parçacığının Sırrı	Doğan Kitap		ISBN 9786050916324
2014	Yaşam Düşüncededir	Yazarın Kendi Yayını		ISBN 978-6056261206
2015	Tanrısal Sağlığın Sırrı	Marnet Yayıncılık		ISBN 9786056546617
2015	The Secret of Divine Health	Yazarın Kendi Yayını		ISBN 9786056546624
2016	Evlilik Yolculuğu	Marnet Yayıncılık		ISBN 978-6056546631
2016	Sır'rın Sırrı	Doğan Kitap		ISBN 978-6056546648
