= İhsan Hakan =

İhsan Hakan (1965, in Ankara – 1 November 1993, in Ankara), also known as Mustafa Deniz, was a PKK defector who was killed, according to some as part of a cover-up of the suspected assassination of general Eşref Bitlis, in a mysterious plane crash.

== Controversy ==
A so-called "repentant militant" (i.e., defector of the PKK) and PKK informer, Hakan was given the code name "Mustafa Deniz" and assumed a new existence. In June 1993 he co-founded an Ankara-based film and video company.

On 1 November 1993 he disappeared, and on 4 November his corpse was found in the vicinity of Avcılar Village of Polatlı District of Ankara, shot dead by a bullet to his head, while the bodies of gendarmerie commander Cem Ersever and his girlfriend Nevval Boz were found elsewhere.
