= Eşref Bitlis =

General Commander of Turkish Gendarmarie

- Born: 1933; Malatya, Turkey
- Died: 17 February 1993 (aged 59–60) Güvercinlik Army Air Base, Ankara, Turkey
- Allegiance: Turkey
- Branch: Turkish Gendarmerie
- Service years: 1952–1993
- Rank: General
- Commands: Commander of Gendarmerie; Commander of Cyprus Turkish Peace Force; Commander of 28.Division of Cyprus Turkish Peace Force; Commander of 2nd Commando Brigade; Turkish Military Academy
- Conflicts: Turkish invasion of Cyprus
- Awards: Turkish Armed Forces Medal of Distinguished Service; Cyprus War Medal

Eşref Bitlis (Malatya 1933 – Ankara 17 February 1993) was a general in the Turkish Gendarmerie, who died in a controversial plane crash.

== Background ==
He was born 1933 in the eastern Anatolian city of Malatya, Turkey. He attended the Turkish Military Academy, finishing it in 1952 with the rank of lieutenant. In 1966, he graduated from the War Academy of the Army (Turkish: Kara Harp Akademisi).

After completing a language course in Germany, Bitlis studied further at the Academy of the Turkish Armed Forces (Turkish: Silahlı Kuvvetler Akademisi), graduating in 1969. Later, he was educated at the Führungsakademie der Bundeswehr, the highest military academy of the German armed forces. He graduated in Germany in 1973.

== Career ==
Following his graduation in Germany in 1973, Bitlis returned home and served one year as head teacher at the War Academy of the Army.

In 1978, Eşref Bitlis was promoted to brigadier general and appointed commander of the 2nd Commando Brigade in Bolu, a mountain warfare specialized unit. After becoming a major general in 1978, he assumed the command of the 28th Infantry Division, headquartered in the Paşaköy village of Nicosia, Cyprus. In 1986, he advanced to the rank of a lieutenant general. Bitlis was appointed commander of the Cyprus Turkish Peace Forces. Two years later in 1990, he became an army general and General Commander of the Turkish Gendarmerie.

=== General Commander of the Turkish Gendarmerie (1990–1993) ===
As General Commander of the Turkish Gendarmerie, Bitlis supported the plans of President Turgut Özal to resolve the Kurdish–Turkish conflict by peaceful means. A week before he died, Bitlis met the foreign ministers of Syria, Iran and Iraq to discuss Özal's peace plans. He was also investigating an issue which journalist Uğur Mumcu, assassinated in January 1993, had been, namely the funnelling of 100,000 rifles from Turkey to Kurdish armed forces in Iraq. The Turkish Daily News later interviewed an army general who said that the commander of the Joint United States Military Mission for Aid to Turkey (JUSMMAT) had complained about Bitlis to the chief of staff for collecting information about illegal activities pertaining to Operation Provide Comfort (OPC). Other OPC officers also complained to Washington. Bitlis aggressively opposed American designs; he had allegedly dismissed Americans supporting the Turkish Gendarmerie as well as CIA agents operating from humanitarian organizations active in the region. The interviewed general said that Bitlis had discovered arms intended for Jalal Talabani and Massoud Barzani concealed in crates purportedly containing food. According to another source, Bitlis was given photographs taken by JITEM operatives depicting three OPC helicopters distributing material to the PKK on 10 December 1992. Such acts led Bitlis to conclude that America was intent on establishing a Kurdish state encompassing Turkey. Bitlis proposed to solve the PKK conflict by severing its logistical support. To this end, he suggested establishing relations with neighboring countries.

== Death ==
On February 17, 1993, a snowy day, Bitlis was on an official trip by plane from the Güvercinlik Army Air Base in Ankara. He switched airplanes when the pilot realized the cockpit was out of order. His Beechcraft Super King Air B-200 crashed minutes after taking off from the air base. Bitlis, his aide-de-camp Fahir Işık, technician Emir Öner and the pilots, who had VIP green card certification for excellence in flying, died in the crash. The chief of staff, Gen. Doğan Güreş, said the accident was due to atmospheric icing but this has been denied by the manufacturer and experts from Istanbul Technical University and Middle East Technical University. According to the Etimesgut Air Base Weather Department's weather report for that day, there was no ice accumulation: "Calm, windy, 1,500 meters visibility, snowy, low clouds affected. Cloud level 800 feet, peak 8,000 feet. The weather is completely overcast. The temperature is -4 degrees and the pressure is 1,018 milibars." The military prosecutor who initially investigated the incident, Col. Hasan Tüysüzoğlu, remained convinced twenty years later that the crash was due to sabotage, and said that the dossier was taken from him, and no further investigation deemed necessary.

Gendarmerie commander Cem Ersever, who had been in charge of the JİTEM group's southeastern operations, left the army in mid-1993. He was allegedly in contact with the PKK through the Syrian intelligence service and the American special forces. Bitlis was fighting the PKK, and therefore on bad terms with Ersever. For this reason, some speculate that Ersever may have been responsible for Bitlis' death. Ersever himself was killed on 4 November 1993, along with his girlfriend Nevval Boz and right-hand man Mustafa Deniz, some suggest to cover up Bitlis' death. JITEM fugitive Abdülkadir Aygan suspects Veli Küçük, who is currently detained in the Ergenekon investigation, of having ordered Ersever's death. Ersever was resentful towards Küçük of being shunted to Ankara after the scandal surrounding Bitlis' death, perceiving Küçük as taking the credit for his achievements. According to Arif Doğan, the plane crash was engineered by Ersever together with Mahmut Yıldırım (Yeşil).

Journalist Metin Kaplan offers a polar opposite account. Kaplan says that Ersever and Bitlis were in fact close friends, who were killed by American agents, and that Mustafa Deniz is still alive. Kaplan thinks it unlikely that Ersever killed Bitlis considering their alleged closeness, and the fact that Ersever was poor; he allegedly received pocket money from his publisher. Kaplan says that a person tasked with carrying out an assassination for a foreign government would be well funded. Kaplan also says that the air base Bitlis departed from quartered two JUSMMAT planes, and two American technicians, who likely had access to Bitlis' plane. Ultimately, Kaplan concludes that the Turkish military was aware that the Americans did it, but covered it up to maintain good relations.

Recently uncovered evidence suggests that his death and that of Mumcu may be related to the shadowy Ergenekon network. Both Bitlis and Mumcu were investigating how Jalal Talabani, one of the Kurdish leaders of northern Iraq, came into possession of 100,000 firearms belonging to the Turkish Armed Forces. However, the Ergenekon case is still in progress, and alternative explanations have been proffered to explain Mumcu's death (such as that Ersever did do it).

He was survived by his spouse Şükran and son Tarık.

My father was always a symbol of peace, so he was murdered. I believe that taking revenge is a sign of primitiveness and I will go on with my investigation into the accident.
- His son, Tarik.

=== Reopening of the death case ===
On September 30, 2010, the office of the chief public prosecutor in Ankara reopened the case relating to the death of Bitlis on the basis of some news recently published in the Turkish media.

Prosecutor Hüseyin Görüşen was tasked with the investigation to find out the cause of the 1993 plane crash. The military prosecutor at the Turkish General Staff, who was responsible for the crash investigation, had closed the file with the finding that Bitlis' airplane crash was an accident without any human involvement. However, serious allegations were made by suspects in the ongoing Ergenekon trial that the crash was an assassination.

The case was due to be closed in February 2013 due to the 20-year statute of limitations, but in line with rulings from the European Court of Human Rights against statutes of limitations for murder, prosecutors said they would keep the case open. In September prosecutors issued a "permanent investigation" order.

== See also ==
- "Castle Plan" (Turkish: Kale Planı)
- Col. Kazım Çillioğlu, a member of Bitlis' team who was due to be on the plane Bitlis died in, who allegedly committed suicide on 3 February 1994.

Military offices
Preceded by Burhanettin Bigalı	General Commander of the Turkish Gendarmerie; August 20, 1990–February 17, 1993	Succeeded by Aydın İlter
