= Şırnak death well trials =

Trial in Turkey

The Şırnak death well trials are trials in Turkey in relation to the unsolved murders of 55 people in the mid-1990s in the area of Silopi and Cizre in Şırnak Province. It is alleged that the Turkish Gendarmerie unit JITEM was responsible for abducting at least nine people and dumping their bodies in acid wells. It is alleged that this unit was under the command of local Gendarmerie commander Col. Cemal Temizöz, who was commander in Cizre from 1993 to 1995. Temizöz, who faces nine life sentences, denies the charges. Former Cizre Mayor Kamil Atağ is also a defendant. The murders have been linked with the Ergenekon organization.

== Background ==
In 1995, a Cizre public prosecutor had urged that Temizöz and another be tried for "usurpation, limitation of freedoms, and making death threats". Related case files later went missing.

The 2009 trial was launched after an investigation prompted by testimony from Mehmet Nuri Binzet, the brother of former Cizre Mayor Kamil Atağ.

== Trials ==
=== Evidence ===
The trial began in September 2009, and various witnesses have presented evidence.

Various witnesses have been pressured to give testimony favourable to the defendants, including two former district governors of Şırnak's Cizre district. The key witness in the trials, Mehmet Nuri Binzet, was wiretapped discussing a bribe to withdraw his testimony, and had also been threatened; he later withdrew his testimony. Two secret witnesses had previously withdrawn their testimony. Two witnesses said in 2009 that they saw members of the alleged group torture and murder people. A year later, they attempted to withdraw their testimony, denying that they recalled the incidents and even that they had previously given testimony. Today's Zaman reported that they were "noticeably trembling while testifying in court, which co-plaintiffs take as a concrete sign of intimidation by the suspects."

In 2010, prosecutors asked to include a book by Cem Ersever (assassinated in 1993) as evidence. In 2011, the General Staff contradicted Temizöz' alibi for the 1994 murder of Ramazan Elçi, saying he had not been on a NATO mission abroad at the time, but in his district in Cizre.

A special sergeant accused of a number of murders under Temizöz' command was captured in 2012. Another member of the same JITEM group was identified in 2012, and a separate trial was launched.
