= Şemdinli incident =

Terrorist incident in Turkey

- Location: Şemdinli, Hakkâri, Turkey
- Date: 9 November 2005; 12.15 pm
- Deaths: 1
- Injuries: 5
- Perpetrator: Turkish Gendarmerie's JITEM

The Şemdinli incident occurred on 9 November 2005 when a bookshop in Şemdinli, Hakkari Province, Turkey was attacked with grenades. One person died and several others were injured in the attack on the Umut bookshop. The attack was carried out by Turkish Gendarmerie personnel Ali Kaya, Özcan İldeniz, and Veysel Ateş, who were caught in the act by local residents. The men are said to have worked for the Gendarmerie's JITEM intelligence unit. Two hand grenades were thrown, and a further two retrieved from the perpetrators' car, which was registered to the local Gendarmerie.

In 2010 grenades with the same serial number were found in a house in Erzincan as part of the Ergenekon investigation. The incident has been compared with the Susurluk scandal for the light it casts on the Turkish "deep state."

== Background ==
The incident was preceded by two other terrorist attacks in the town. Five soldiers were killed in a 5 August attack on the Semdinli Gendarme Battalion Command. On 1 November, a 100-kg car bomb injured 67.

According to Abdülkadir Aygan, one of the defendants, Ali Kaya, had previously worked under JITEM commander Cemal Temizöz. Aygan had named him "Mutkili Ali" ("Ali from Mutki").

== Incident ==
Two hand grenades were thrown in the attack on the Umut bookshop. One person died and five were injured. The man killed was a passerby visiting his cousin's nearby shoe shop.

Locals pursued the attacker from the scene to a car parked nearby, where two others were waiting. Police intervened to protect the three from the crowd, and detained them. The three turned out to be Turkish Gendarmerie personnel. Local TV showed the locals searching the car and "brandishing weapons and documents they had found in the trunk of the car. These included identity cards indicating that Kaya and Ildeniz were gendarmerie intelligence officers, an apparent death list of alleged PKK sympathizers and diagrams of the home and workplace of the bookshop’s owner, whose name was also on the death list." Two grenades were retrieved from the car, which was registered to the local Gendarmerie. Other items retrieved from the car included rifles, official documents, and "a list with the bombed bookstore marked with a red cross."

Several hours later, during the local prosecutor's subsequent investigation of the scene, Gendarmerie Sergeant Tanju Çavuş opened fired on the surrounding crowd, killing one and injuring four. He was acquitted in 2012, with a court ruling the act was within the bounds of self-defence.

== Trials ==
In March 2006, the Van prosecutor, Ferhat Sarıkaya, trying the case at Van 3rd High Criminal Court laid out an indictment which said the suspects had links to high-ranking military commanders, including then-Land Forces Commander Gen. Yaşar Büyükanıt. He was dismissed by the Supreme Board of Judges and Prosecutors in April 2006, but the case continued without him. The European Commission declared that "The disproportionate character of this decision raised questions on the independence of the [Board] from other state institutions."

In 2006, Ali Kaya, Özcan İldeniz, and Veysel Ateş were sentenced to over 39 years in prison for murder and membership of a terrorist organization by the Van 3rd High Criminal Court. The Court ruled the three had not acted alone, and that they were part of a significant structure, and directed the state to seek out others involved. Chief of General Staff Yaşar Büyükanıt defended Kaya and İldeniz after the incident, saying of Kaya "I know him, he’s a good kid," and later described the case as an "unprecedented assassination of justice."

Judges trying the case were subsequently relocated to other areas. Police Department Intelligence Unit Chief Sabri Uzun was also sacked in early 2006, having said "The burglar is inside the house" in reference to the case. Uzun had also indicated that the 1 November bombing could be the work of security forces.

The Supreme Court of Appeals ruled a mistrial, declaring the case should have been heard by a military court. In the transfer back to Van, some documents relating to Ateş were lost in a car accident. A military court released the suspects. The Jurisdictional Court later ruled that a civilian court was appropriate following the 2010 constitutional changes.

The three attackers were re-arrested in 2011 by the Van criminal court, and in January 2012 again sentenced to nearly 40 years in prison. In October 2012, the Supreme Court of Appeals overturned the element of the verdict which declared the defendants part of a criminal organization, but upheld the element finding them guilty of murder. New prison sentences for gang membership (prison sentences of one year, 10 months, 27 days) were handed out by the Van 3rd High Criminal Court in May 2013.

== Trials for commenting on the incident ==
In May 2007, former Democracy Party deputy Mahmut Alınak was sentenced to 10 months in prison under Article 301 for his remarks about the Şemdinli incident, in which he described Parliament and the General Staff of Turkey as doing the bidding of the Counter-Guerrilla in protecting those responsible.
