= Silopi =

City in Şırnak Province, Turkey

- Municipality
- Logo

- Location within Turkey
- Coordinates: 37°14′55″N 42°28′13″E
- Country: Turkey
- Province: Şırnak
- District: Silopi

Government
  - Mayor: Jiyan Ormanlı (Independent)
- Population (2023): 108,880
- Time zone: UTC+3 (TRT)

Silopi (Kurdish: Silopî) is a city and seat of Silopi District in the Şırnak Province of Turkey. The city is mainly populated by Kurds of Sipêrtî and Zewkan tribes and had a population of 108,880 in 2023. It is considered to be part of Turkish Kurdistan.

Large sections of the city were destroyed in 2016 during clashes between the Turkish army and Kurdish youths, some of whom were allegedly affiliated with the Kurdistan Workers' Party (PKK).

== History ==
Due to its proximity to Iraqi Kurdistan, Silopi was a major staging ground for Operation Provide Comfort and housed in nearby bases a combined 2500 American, British, and French forces.

=== Kurdish–Turkish conflict ===
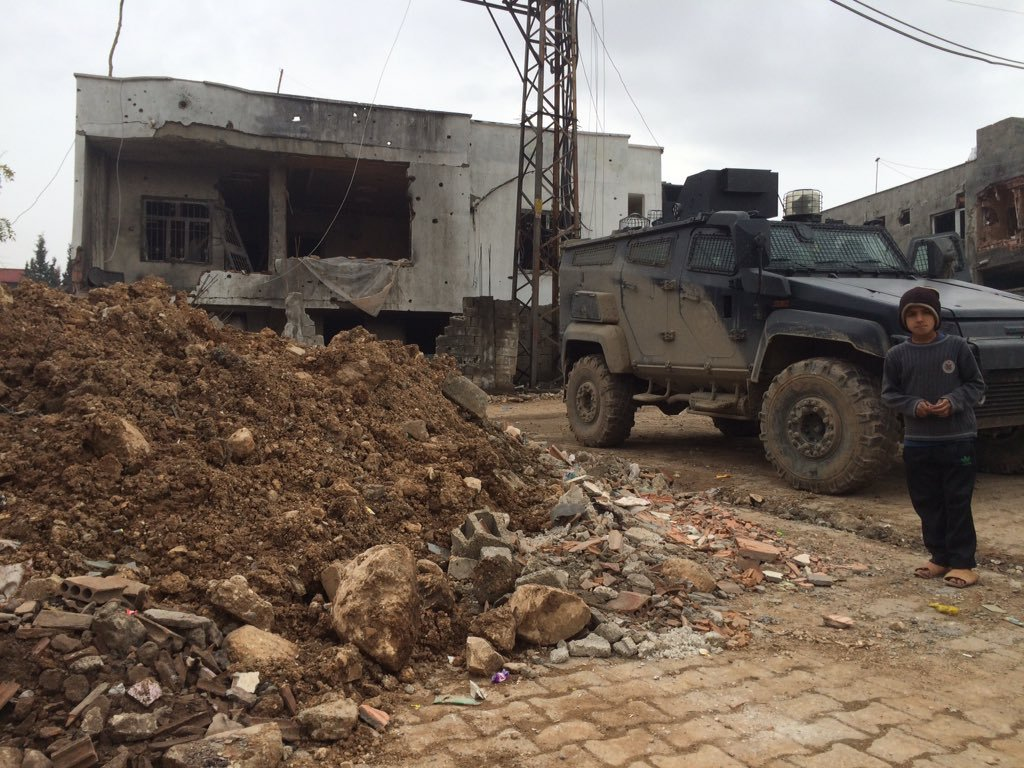
Silopi during the rekindled Kurdish–Turkish conflict in 2016

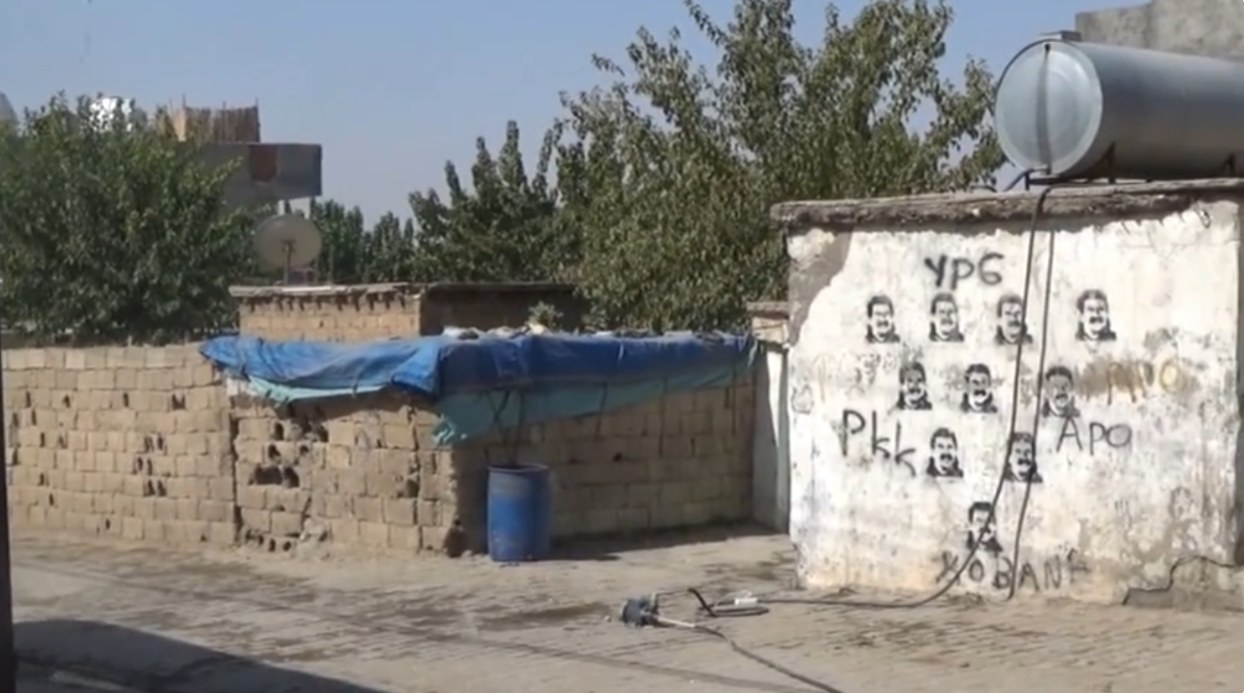
Silopi mural depicting grafitis of Abdullah Öcalan, the PKK, YPG and Kobanî, 2016.

In the late summer and fall of 2015, following the 2014 Kobanî protests and breakdown of the 2013–2015 PKK–Turkey peace process, which were part of the broader third phase of the Kurdish–Turkish conflict, local Kurdish youth and activists, with some of them being affiliated with the Patriotic Revolutionary Youth Movement (YDG-H), and later YPS, organized popular protests and riots throughout Turkish Kurdistan and declared Silopi itself to be an "autonomous zone." The Turkish government responded by imposing curfews on the city, which eventually escalated into a full-scale military confrontation between Kurdish youth affiliated with the YDG-H/YPS and allegedly PKK on one side, and the Turkish army, Gendarmerie and special forces of the police on the other. The so-called “curfew” on the city has been described by observers as a euphemism for a military siege.

The worst hit neighbourhood was Başak, in which on 7 August 2015 Kurdish youth held off the police for four hours. The clashes in Başak may have killed three people. Government reports claimed "terrorists" were killed, while pro-Kurdish Peoples' Democratic Party (HDP) lawmaker Faysal Sarıyıldız said that the casualties were civilians and that he had seen no sign of armed militants. Ferhat Encu, an HDP parliamentarian who lived in Silopi during the fighting, told dpa in March 2016 that the city was being shelled by artillery fire. Alp Kayserilioğlu of Lower Class Magazine also reported on reckless "heavy artillery" shelling on the city by the Turkish Army. Speaking to Amnesty International, a lawyer based in Silopi said that extensive damage to infrastructure including electricity and water supplies occurred, due to the bombardments. Furthermore, Amnesty reported that Turkish security forces prevented ambulances from entering areas under curfew. In one incident cited by Amnesty, the body of a man killed during clashes in Silopi remained at his family's home for 12 days before authorities permitted its collection. In a similar incident, a local reported that the body of 56-year-old Taybet İnan, who was killed by a sniper, was left in the streets of Silopi for seven days as the family was unable to retrieve it. 60-year-old eyewitness, Riskyie Seflek, said that Turkish tanks were deployed behind her home and were targeting the city's mosque, but in doing so, they hit her house's living room.

According to the HDP, 20 civilians were killed as of March 2016, while estimates from Amnesty suggested 25–40 civilians killed, including women and children. In the aftermath, the municipal building was found with its doors torn off, documents scattered across the floors, and windows smashed. Personal belongings such as money and gold were reported stolen. Watches, medals, and posters related to Kurdish culture or the Kurdish resistance were deliberately destroyed. Security forces also reportedly left notes containing severe insults and threats throughout the building. Furthermore, graffiti appeared on the few remaining standing walls in Silopi, reading: “My beloved Turkey — in the name of Allah — we will cleanse you. We are the JÖH, and we have come to send you to hell.” Residents of the affected neighborhoods expressed a clear view that the Turkish state was responsible for the destruction. One homeowner pointed to shell holes and spent cartridges in his house, saying, “Does the PKK have such weapons? It’s obvious this was the state.” An elderly woman whose home was destroyed told reporters cautiously, “We don’t know who caused this damage,” prompting another resident to interject angrily: “Of course we know! It was the state and its IS mercenaries. How could the PKK cause such destruction? With what weapons, and for what reason?”

== Neighborhoods ==
The city is divided into the eleven neighborhoods: Barbaros, Başak, Cudi, Cumhuriyet (Kizir), Dicle, Karşıyaka, Nuh, Ofis, Şehit Harun Boy, Yenişehir and Yeşiltepe.

== Climate ==
On 25 July 2025, Silopi recorded 50.5 °C (122.9 °F), setting a new national highest temperature record in Turkey, as well as recording for the first time a temperature of 50 °C (122 °F) in Turkey. The previous highest temperature record in Turkey was held by Sarıcakaya, Eskişehir Province in northwest Turkey (49.5 °C (121.1 °F) in August 2023).

== Economy ==
Silopi is located 14 km (9 miles) from the Ibrahim Khalil border crossing, Turkey's largest border crossing with Iraq, and relies on it economically, as the town has no manufacturing or similar industries. Hotels, restaurants, and shops are situated along the roads leading to the border to serve travelers.

As of 2019, Şırnak Silopi power station was powered by asphaltite coal and was claimed both to emit air pollution and to be an important source of employment. In 2020 the EBRD proposed a just transition to support workers who may lose jobs due to the decline of coal in Turkey.

Peanuts are grown.

== Governance ==
Levent Taysun was elected mayor of Silopi in 1984 and was arrested in 1992, along with four of his sons, five of his brothers, and 25 other relatives, for allegedly supporting the PKK. According to Taysun, he was severely tortured and later fled to Germany to receive medical treatment.

The pro-Kurdish Peoples' Democratic Party (HDP) mayor of Silopi, Emine Esmer, was deposed during the breakdown of the 2013–2015 PKK–Turkey peace process and the subsequent armed clashes in Turkish Kurdistan and Silopi. She was later prosecuted for allegedly calling for an "armed rebellion against the government."

Adalet Fidan of the HDP was elected mayor in 2019 but deposed the same year and replaced by the sub-governor (kaymakam), Sezer Işiktaş, as acting mayor.

== Population ==
Population history from 2007 to 2023:

Population
Year	Pop.	±%
2007	70,670	—
2010	76,323	+8.0%
2015	87,150	+14.2%
2020	101,207	+16.1%
2023	108,880	+7.6%

== See also ==
- Mount Judi
- Şırnak death well trials
