= Neval Boz =

Mahsune Dguvebe (died 4 November 1993), better known by her alias Muhsine Neval Boz was a woman who was killed, according to some as part of a cover-up of the suspected assassination of General Eşref Bitlis, who died in a mysterious plane crash. She was known as the girlfriend and translator of gendarmerie commander Cem Ersever, who was also assassinated.

On 1 November 1993 she disappeared, and on 4 November (Note: Some sources have other dates.) her corpse was found on the highway between Istanbul and Ankara, while the bodies of Cem Ersever and another of his close companions, PKK informer İhsan Hakan, were found elsewhere.
