= 1993 Kurdistan Workers' Party ceasefire =

Ceasefire in the Turkish-Kurdish conflict

The Kurdistan Workers' Party ceasefire of 1993 was a short lived ceasefire declared by Abdullah Öcalan at a press conference he held together with Jalal Talabani ahead of Newroz on 17 March 1993.

== Background ==
The Kurdistan Workers' Party (PKK) waged a guerrilla war against Turkey since 1984. Their demands initially included independence for a Kurdistan to be created out of the Kurdish areas in Turkey, but later transformed into a demand for more political and cultural freedom. In 1991, the Government of Turgut Özal ended the denial of the Kurdish identity by the Turkish government, a policy majorly implemented by the Turkish government since its first constitution in 1924. Following, Öcalan gave interviews to several newspapers based in Turkey and spoke of his willingness to reach a political solution in the conflict with Turkey.

== History ==
At the press conference on 17 March with Jalal Talabani, the leader of the Patriotic Union of Kurdistan (PUK), three aspects of the ceasefire were pointed out.

- the ceasefire was of unconditional nature,
- the PKK has no intention to separate from Turkey and
- the conflict should be "resolved within nationally agreed borders"

A second press conference took place on 19 March, where Kemal Burkay, a Kurdish politician from Turkey, signed an agreement with Öcalan, mentioning their support for the peace initiative. No positive response towards the ceasefire was recorded by the Government of Turkey. To the contrary, further attacks on the Kurdish rural population followed the ceasefire announcement and an oppression of the politicians of the People's Labor Party (HEP) intensified and as Newroz was celebrated on 21 March 1993, Alparslan Turkeş and Erdal Inönü, the party leaders of the Nationalist Movement Party (MHP) and the Republican People's Party (CHP) assisted a reunion of Turkic people from the Soviet Union. Then Süleyman Demirel, the prime minister of Turkey at the time, also refused to negotiate with the PKK in a statement released on 23 March 1993.

A third press conference took place on 16 April 1993 in Bar Elias, Lebanon, where the ceasefire was prolonged indefinitely. To this event, Jalal Talabani, Ahmet Türk from the HEP and again Kemal Burkay attended and also declared their support for the ceasefire. A day later, on 17 April 1993, the Turkish President Turgut Özal died unexpectedly. Doğan Güreş and Tansu Çiller, the chief of staff of the military and the prime minister at the time, both released statements against peace with the PKK and the latter was reported to have supported a military solution to the conflict. Ahmet Türks assistance at the press conference was heavily criticized by the Turkish authorities and the ceasefire ended after Turkish troops launched an attack on 19 May 1993, in which 13 members of the PKK were killed. On 24 May 1993, the PKK ambushed and killed 33 Turkish soldiers and 5 civilians on the highway from Elazığ to Bingöl. On 8 June, Öcalan officially announced the end of the ceasefire.

== Aftermath ==
In August 1993, Öcalan claimed that the failure of the peace process envisaged by the PKK during İsmet Sezgin tenure as Minister of the Interior, prevented him to assume as prime minister. After he was captured and tried in 1999, he based his defense also on the cease fire of 1993.

== See also ==
- Kurdish-Turkish peace initiatives 1991-2004
- 2025 PKK-Turkey peace process
- Bingöl massacre (1993)
