= İtirafçı =

Defector from the Kurdistan Workers' Party (PKK)

In the context of the Kurdish–Turkish conflict an itirafçı (Turkish pronunciation: [itiɾafˈtʃɯ], 'defector' or 'confessor') is a former member of the Kurdistan Workers' Party (PKK) who worked as an informant or collaborator for the Turkish security forces against the PKK. Some merely provided intelligence, while others were persuaded or coerced into taking active roles in the conflict. İtirafçıs played a significant role in the conflict in southeastern Turkey in the 1990s, as they were often used to do the extralegal work of security forces, particularly in the case of the unofficial Turkish Gendarmerie unit JİTEM. According to figures of the Ministry of Justice, about 1,950 PKK militants became confessors after their arrest. Unofficial figures put the number of confessors that were used and paid in the fight against the PKK at 500. Abdülkadir Aygan has been described as "the most well-known among PKK members turned informants". A confessor was involved in the 2005 Şemdinli incident.
