= Altay Tokat =

Turkish general

- Born: 18 June 1940 (age 86); Büyükkışla, Çandır, Yozgat, Turkey
- Military career
- Allegiance: Turkey
- Branch: Turkish Army
- Service years: 1960-1999
- Rank: Lieutenant General

Mehmet Altay Tokat (born 18 June 1940) is a retired Turkish general. He served in south-eastern Turkey (OHAL) in the mid-1990s in the Turkish–Kurdish conflict, and led Operation Hammer (1997) into northern Iraq against PKK. He retired in 1999. After his retirement he joined the Nationalist Movement Party, and served on its Central Executive Board.

In 2006 Tokat made remarks in an interview with Yeni Aktüel about ordering grenades to be thrown near the homes of public servants who had moved to the region from western Turkey, in order to "acquaint them with the realities of the region". No-one was hurt or injured in the attacks. He compared his actions to the 2005 Şemdinli incident then under litigation, in which one person died, saying "They were unskillful and inept in Şemdinli". The remarks led to an investigation, and he was put on trial for "attempting to erode the feeling of trust for commanders and making statements without authorization". The military court dropped the charges in October 2006 when it concluded it did not have the appropriate jurisdiction, and that the matter belonged in a civilian court.

Tokat graduated from the Turkish Military Academy in 1960.

Tokat was awarded Turkish Armed Forces Medal of Merit (TSK Liyakat Madalyası), Turkish Armed Forces Medal of Distinguished Courage and Self-Sacrifice (TSK Üstün Cesaret ve Feragat Madalyası) and Turkish Armed Forces Medal of Achievement (TSK Başarı Madalyası).

== Books ==
- Mücadele ve Çözüm (PKK Bölücü Terörü), Nergiz Yayınları, 2013
