= Düzce Military Cemetery =

Cemetery in Düzce Province, Turkey

Details
- Established: 30 April 1997
- Location: Elmalık, Düzce, Düzce Province
- Country: Turkey
- No. of graves: 4

The Düzce Military Cemetery is a military cemetery in town Elmalık of Düzce, Düzce Province in Turkey.

== History ==
The cemetery was established on 30 April 1997 for a Turkish Armed Forces troop killed in Kurdish-Turkish conflict. Between years of 1997 and 2002, 3 more troops from Düzce were buried in the cemetery, all died in different places on different dates. Three of the four buried troops were killed in ambushes and attacks while one troop died in a road accident.
