= Cemal Temizöz =

- Born: September 4, 1958 (age 68); Çorum
- Military career
- Allegiance: Turkish
- Branch: Gendarmerie General Command
- Service years: 1979-2010
- Rank: Colonel
- Awards: Turkish Armed Forces Medal of Distinguished Courage and Self-Sacrifice

Cemal Temizöz (born 4 September 1958) is a Turkish retired colonel. He was tried at the Şırnak death well trials and the Sledgehammer trials, which he received an amnesty for both.

== Life ==
Temizöz graduated from the Turkish Military Academy in 1979. He served in Cizre between 1993-1995 and carried out successful operations on erasing PKK from Cizre. After his duty in Cizre, he commanded Aydın First Gendarmerie Education Battalion. Later, he rose to the rank of lieutenant colonel and commanded Tekirdağ Provincial Gendarmerie Command. After that, he rose to the rank of colonel and commanded Denizli Provincial Gendarmerie Command. In January 2006, he was assigned for the investigation to be held in Haydarpaşa GATA. During the investigation, he found out patient information of relatives of Land Forces Commander Yaşar Büyükanıt was revealed by a Gülen movement member. Later, he commanded Kayseri Provincial General Command. While in Kayseri, he detected 3 non-commissioned officers are working for the Gülen Movement. Their activities included giving out some documents to the movement and loading forged documents to the unit commander's computer. Temizöz retired in 2010.

== Şırnak death well trials ==
Temizöz was detained on 23 March 2009 for the "perpetrator unknown" murders after testimonies of two secret witnesses, "Tükenmez Kalem" (real name: Fırat Altın) and "Sokak Lambası" (real name: Hıdır Altuğ), and an open witness, Mehmet Nuri Binzet (who was 13 years old at the time of alleged murders). All three later withdrew their testimonies, with Binzet saying that he hated his family for making him a village guard and Colonel Cemal Temizöz for giving consent" and that he heard many incidents from different people and threw them on Kamil Atağ and his son as well as Cemal Temizöz.

After excavations in Cizre, 13 pieces of bones were found. After tests done in forensic medicine, it turned out that all these were animal bones.

Temizöz was released on 12 September 2014 and received an amnesty for the death well case on 5 November 2015.

== Sledgehammer trials ==
Temizöz gave a testimony as a suspect of Sledgehammer trials on 7 June 2010. He was accused of the "CD number 10". He argued he was targeted by the Gülen movement and PKK for his past activities and that Gülen movement laid a plot against him. He also argued that the trial was meant for revenge and political reckoning. He was sentenced to 18 years in prison on 21 September 2012, but received an amnesty for the Sledgehammer case on 31 March 2015.
