= 33 Martyrs Memorial =

Monument in Turkey to the memory of 33 unarmed recruits killed by PKK

- 33 Şehit Anıtı
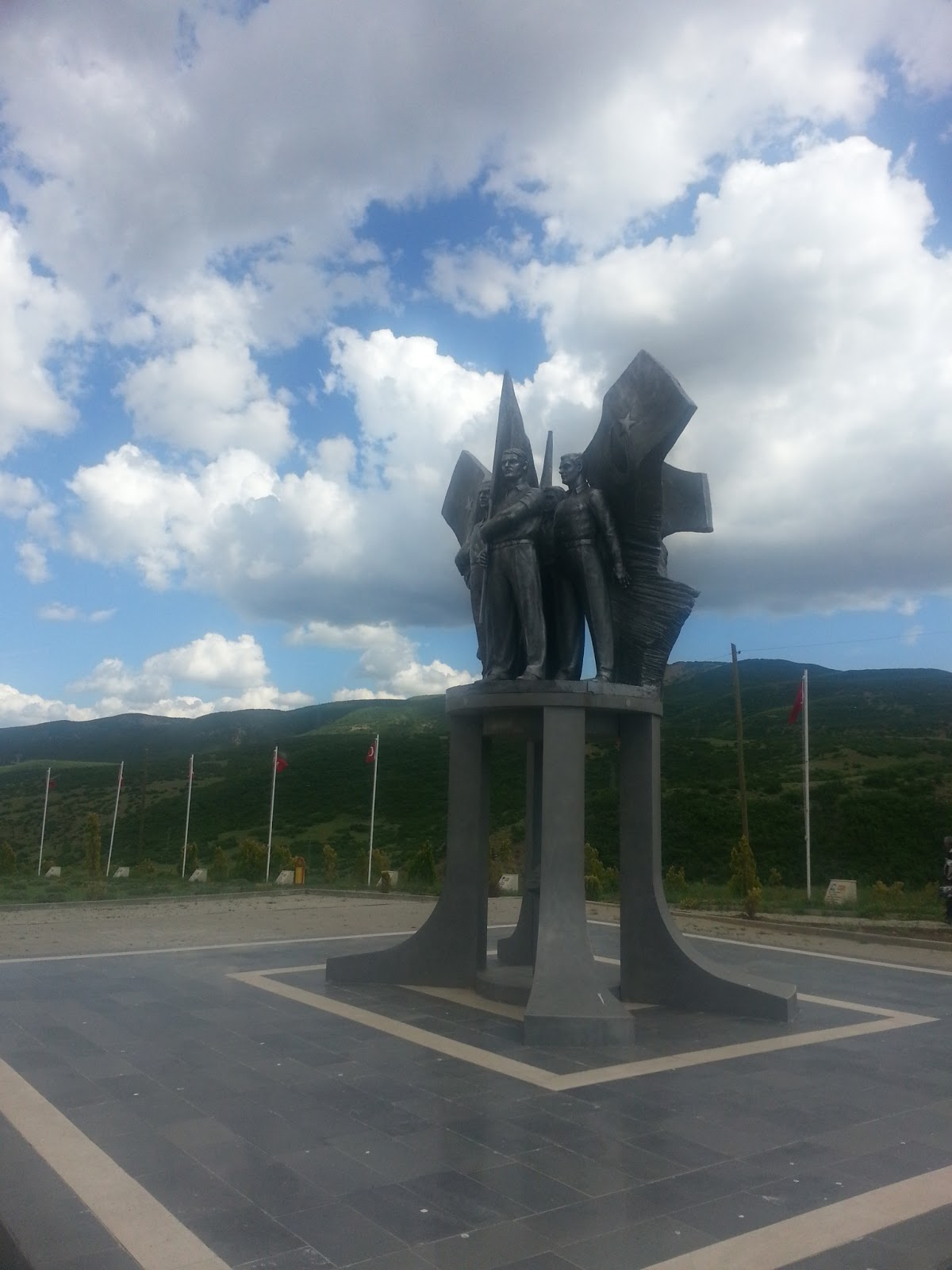
- Interactive map of 33 Martyrs Memorial
- Location: Bingöl Province, Turkey
- Coordinates: 38.928838719881995°N 40.36098767996801°E
- Type: Memorial
- Opening date: 24 May 2012
- Dedicated to: Victims of the Bingöl massacre

The 33 Martyrs Memorial is a memorial in Bingöl Province, Turkey dedicated to 33 unarmed Turkish Army recruits killed by Kurdistan Workers' Party (PKK) militants in the 1993 Bingöl massacre.

The memorial is 13 kilometers west of Bingöl. In June 2007, a 10 square meter Turkish flag on a 33 meters long flagpole (representing the 33 recruits killed in the attack) was erected, along with cenotaphs for all 33 recruits. The memorial was opened to the public in 2012.

== Gallery ==
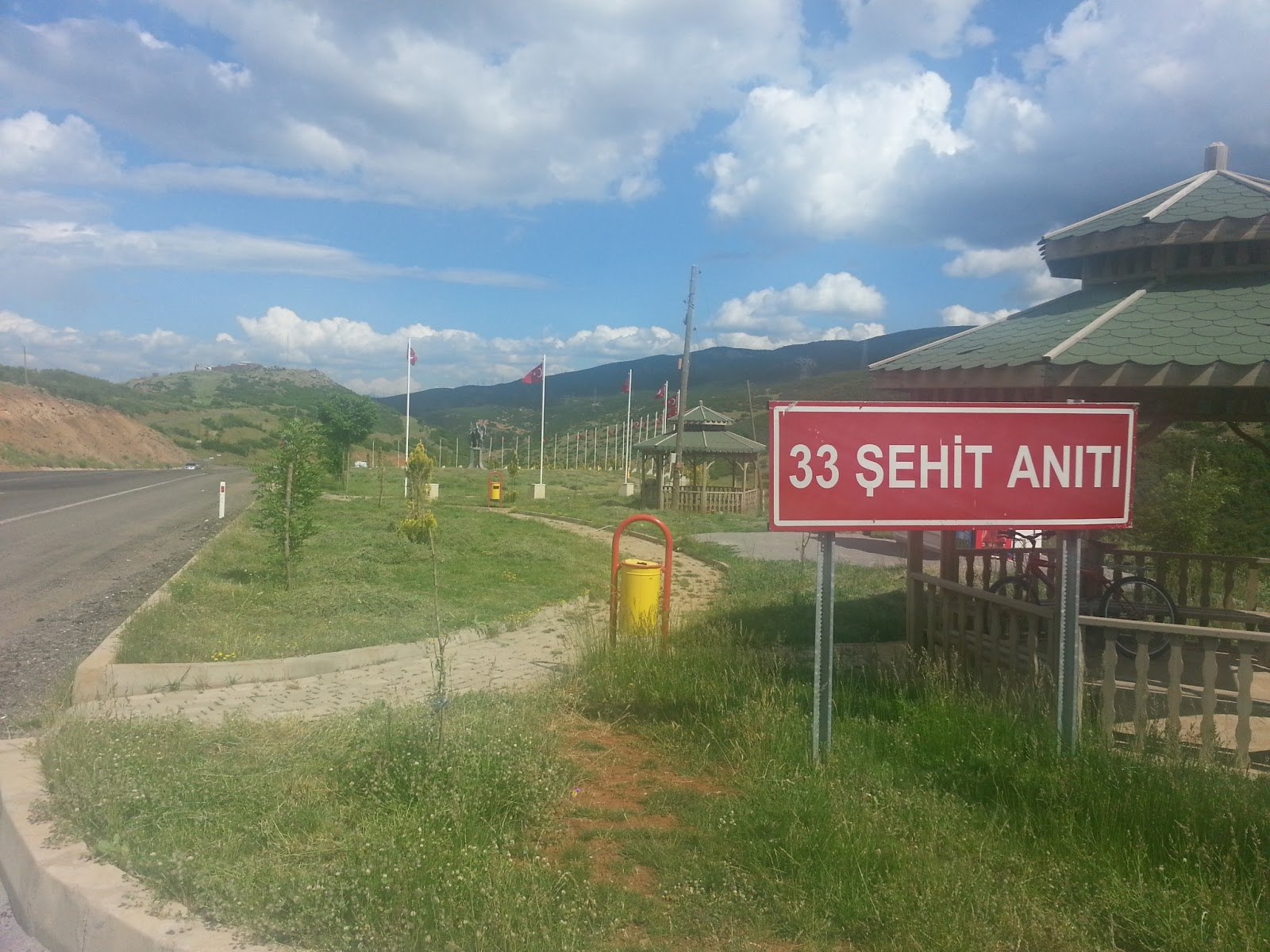
A sign on the road to the monument

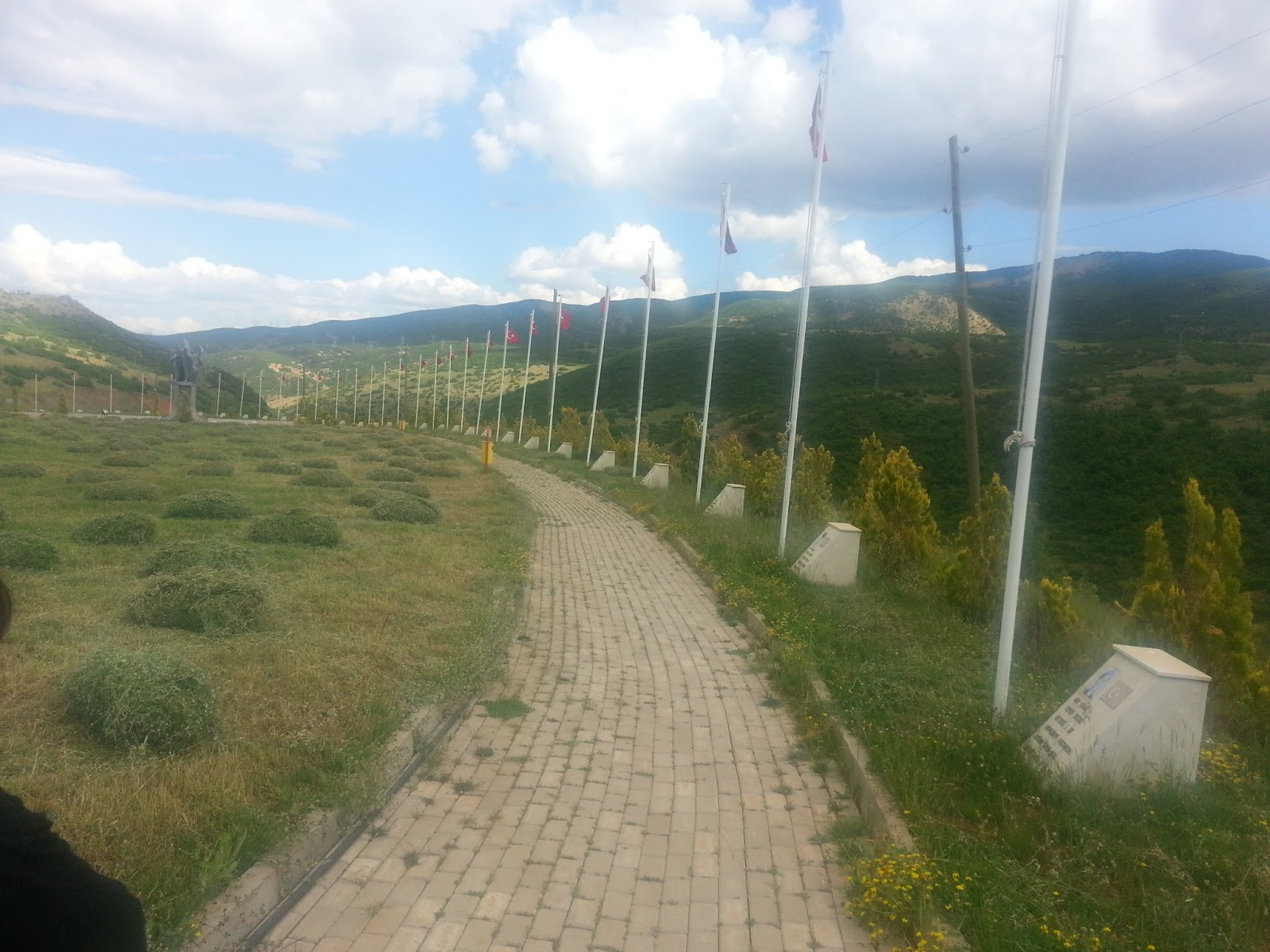
Cenotaphs of 33 recruits
