= Tansu Çiller =

Prime Minister of Turkey from 1993 to 1996

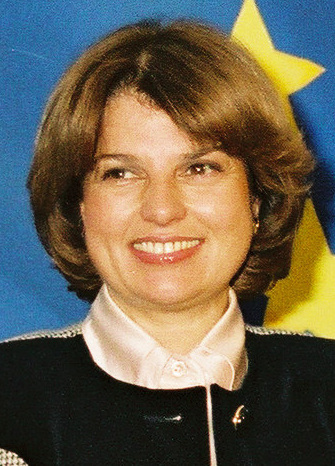
- Çiller in 1994

22nd Prime Minister of Turkey
- In office 25 June 1993 – 6 March 1996
- President: Süleyman Demirel
- Deputy: Murat Karayalçın; Hikmet Çetin; Deniz Baykal
- Preceded by: Erdal İnönü (acting)
- Succeeded by: Mesut Yılmaz

Deputy Prime Minister of Turkey
- In office 28 June 1996 – 30 June 1997
- Prime Minister: Necmettin Erbakan
- Preceded by: Nahit Menteşe
- Succeeded by: İsmet Sezgin

Minister of Foreign Affairs
- In office 28 June 1996 – 30 June 1997
- Prime Minister: Necmettin Erbakan
- Preceded by: Emre Gönensay
- Succeeded by: İsmail Cem

Minister of State (Responsible for Economy)
- In office 21 November 1991 – 25 June 1993
- Prime Minister: Süleyman Demirel

Leader of the True Path Party
- In office 13 June 1993 – 14 December 2002
- Preceded by: Süleyman Demirel
- Succeeded by: Mehmet Ağar

Member of the Grand National Assembly
- In office 20 October 1991 – 3 November 2002
- Constituency: Istanbul (1991, 1995, 1999)

Personal details
- Born: Tansu Penbe Çiller; 24 May 1946 (age 80) Istanbul, Turkey
- Party: True Path Party
- Spouse: Özer Uçuran (m. 1963; died 2024)
- Children: 2
- Education: American College for Girls
- Alma mater: Robert College (BS); University of New Hampshire (MS); University of Connecticut (PhD)

Tansu Çiller (Turkish: [ˈtɑnsu ˈtʃilːɛɾ]; born 24 May 1946) is a Turkish academic, economist, and politician who served as the 22nd prime minister of Turkey from 1993 to 1996. She is Turkey's only female prime minister. As the leader of the True Path Party, she went on to concurrently serve as Deputy Prime Minister of Turkey and as minister of foreign affairs between 1996 and 1997.

As a professor of economics, Çiller was appointed Minister of State for the economy by Prime Minister Süleyman Demirel in 1991. When Demirel was elected as President in 1993, Çiller succeeded him as leader of the True Path Party and prime minister. Her premiership presided over the intensifying armed conflict between the Turkish Armed Forces and the PKK, resulting in Çiller's enacting reforms to national defense. Her government was able to persuade the United States and the European Union to register the PKK as a terrorist organization.

Shortly after winning the 1994 local elections, large-scale capital flight due to the lack of confidence in Çiller's budget deficit targets led to the Turkish lira and foreign currency reserves' almost collapsing. Amid the subsequent economic crisis and austerity measures, her government signed the EU-Turkey Customs Union in 1995. Her government was alleged to have supported the 1995 Azeri coup d'état attempt and presided over an escalation of tensions with Greece after claiming sovereignty over the Imia/Kardak islets.

Although the DYP came third in the 1995 general election, she remained prime minister until she formed a coalition government with Necmettin Erbakan in 1996. The Susurluk scandal that year revealed the relations between illegal organisations and Çiller's government. Revelations that she had employed individuals connected with the Turkish mafia and the Grey Wolves such as Abdullah Çatlı led to a decline in her approval ratings. Erbakan's and Çiller's government fell when tensions with the military, concerned with civilians' lack of commitment to secularism, boiled over. This coup d'état by military memorandum was the fourth in the republic's history. DYP declined further in the 1999 general election. Despite coming third in the 2002 general election, Çiller's DYP won less than 10% of the vote and thus lost all parliamentary representation, which led to her resignation as party leader and departure from active politics.

== Background and academic career ==
Tansu Çiller was born in Istanbul; she was the only child of her father Necati Çiller, a journalist and governor of Bilecik Province during the 1950s, and Muazzez Çiller, a Rumelian Turk from Thessaloniki.

Çiller graduated from the department of Economics at Robert College Yüksek Kısım after completing her high school education at the American College for Girls in Istanbul. After graduating from Robert College, she continued her studies in the United States, where she earned graduate degrees from the University of New Hampshire and University of Connecticut with her husband Özer Uçuran, whom she married in 1963. She later completed her postdoctoral studies at Yale University.

Çiller taught economics at Franklin and Marshall College in Lancaster, Pennsylvania. In 1978, she became a lecturer at Boğaziçi University in Istanbul and in 1983 she was appointed as professor by the same institution. She was also president of the now-defunct İstanbul Bank.

== Early political career ==
In addition to her job at Boğaziçi, Çiller made a name for herself with her studies at TÜSİAD and her critical reports of the Motherland Party's (ANAP) economic policies. For a brief period she was a consultant to Bedrettin Dalan, then Mayor of Istanbul. In December of the same year, she was elected to the administrative board of the other major center-right party, the True Path Party (DYP) and became the deputy president responsible for the economy. Çiller entered parliament as a deputy from Istanbul in the 1991 election. Çiller took credit for some DYP slogans for the election, such as "two keys", but also generated controversy with the economic program called UDİDEM, which was not implemented by the government. DYP won the election, and formed a coalition government with the Social Democrat Populist Party (SHP). Çiller was appointed as a minister of state responsible for the economy by Prime Minister Süleyman Demirel. She was elected to the executive board of DYP and acquired the position of deputy chair.

After the death in office of President Turgut Özal (which according to some was part of an alleged military coup), Prime Minister Demirel won the 1993 presidential election. Suddenly the important position as prime minister and leader of the DYP was vacant. The party found itself in a leadership crisis. Çiller was no obvious candidate, but her three challengers could not muster the political capital to compete effectively. The media and business community supported her, and her gender gave the impression that Turkey was a progressive Muslim country. She fell 11 votes shy of a majority in the first ballot for party leader. Her opponents withdrew and Çiller became the party's leader and on 25 June, the first and so far only female Prime Minister of Turkey. She continued the DYP-SHP coalition with small changes (50th government of Turkey).

== Premiership (1993–1996) ==
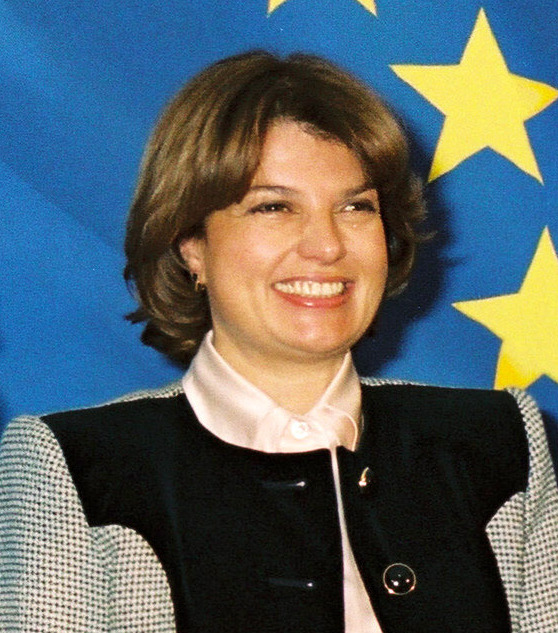
Tansu Çiller, 1994

(1993–1996) During her tenure as prime minister, an Islamist mob set fire to a hotel which was hosting an Alevi cultural event, killing 35 and wounding many others. The Sivas massacre and the government's slow response foreshadowed Çiller's future handling of human rights.

Çiller chose to continue Demirel's coalition government with the SHP, but replaced most of the ministers from her own party. She was the only woman in cabinet until 1995, when a woman state minister for women and family affairs was appointed. As Prime Minister Çiller promoted a pro-military conservative populism and economic liberalism. She shifted the DYP more to the right compared to her mentor Demirel. She juggled "masculine" and "feminine" styles, boasting of her "toughness" at the same time as she wanted to be the nation's mother and sister. She became a new role model for women politicians, though was accused of being authoritarian. Çiller appeared uninterested in women's issues.

Çiller played a major role in reforming Turkey's economic institutions, which are known as the 5 April Decisions and was rewarded with IMF funding.

=== Fighting the PKK ===
Her premiership preceded over the intensifying armed conflict between the Turkish Armed Forces and the PKK, resulting in Çiller's enacting numerous reforms to national defense and implementing the Castle Plan. The Castle Plan (previously approved by the National Security Council) was implemented to combat the PKK (although elements of the strategy preceded the official plan). Çiller transformed the Turkish Army from an organization using vintage equipment from the US Army into a modern fighting force capable of countering the PKK which used guerilla warfare and hit-and-run tactics. With a better equipped military, Çiller's government was able to persuade the United States and the European Union to register the PKK as a terrorist organization. However, Çiller was responsible for war crimes and crimes against humanity perpetrated against the Kurdish people by the Turkish military, security forces, and paramilitary. Several reports of international organizations of human rights documented destroying and burning Kurdish villages and towns and extrajudicial killings of Kurdish civilians perpetrated by the Turkish military during Çiller's government of 1993–1996.

Her overall approach to the Kurds was ambiguous, while she suggested for the Kurds an autonomy similar the one the Basques have in Spain, she retracted her statement upon pressure from the Turkish military.

=== Links with organized crime ===
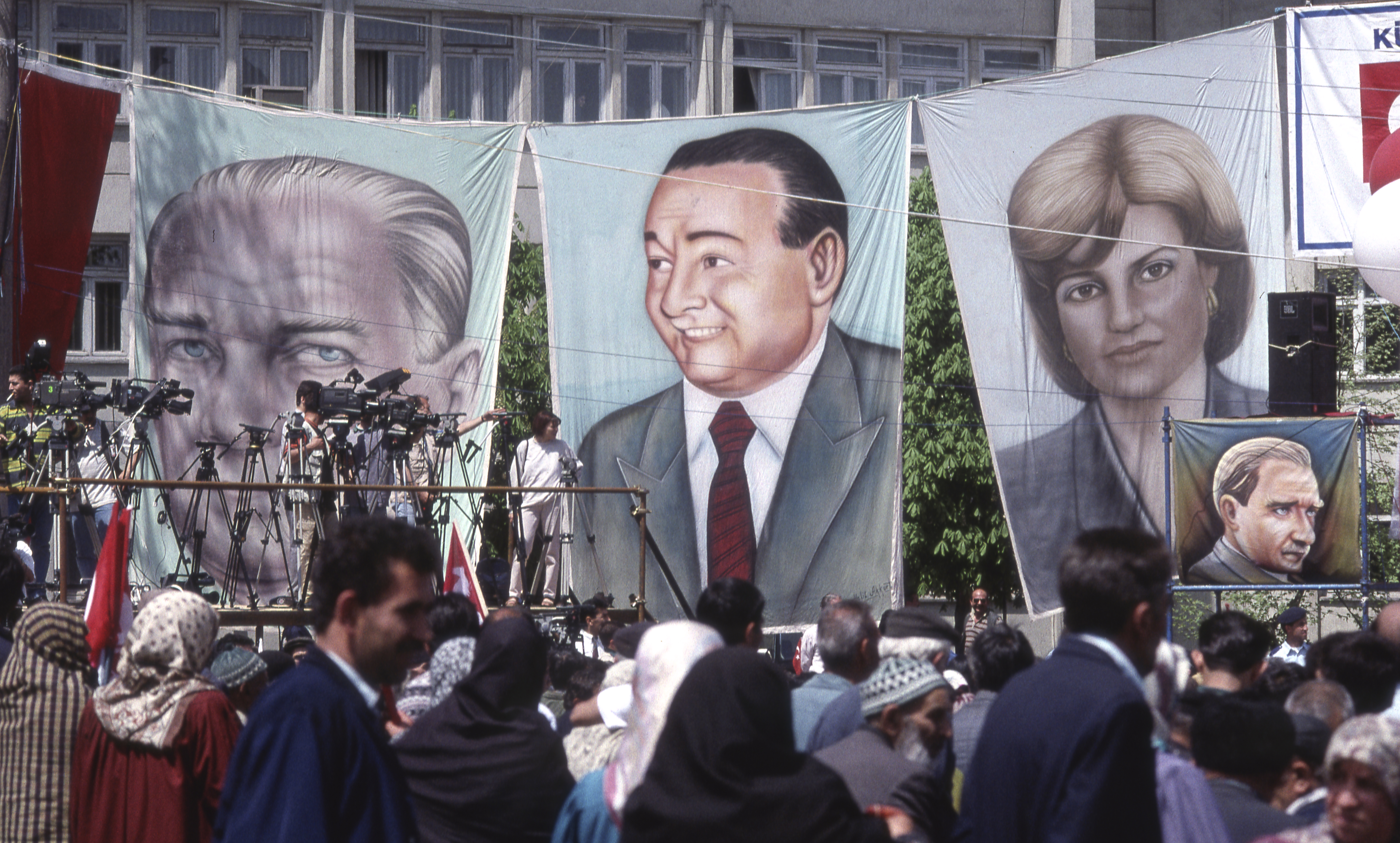
1994 DYP election rally in Kütahya

She declared in October 1993: "We know the list of businessmen and artists subjected to racketeering by the PKK and we shall be bringing their members to account." Beginning on 14 January 1994, almost a hundred people were kidnapped by commandos wearing uniforms and traveling in police vehicles and then killed somewhere along the road from Ankara to Istanbul. Abdullah Çatlı, a leader of the ultra-nationalist Grey Wolves and an organized crime figure, demanded money from people who were on "Çiller’s list", promising to get their names removed. One of his victims, Behçet Cantürk, was to pay ten million dollars, to which Casino King Ömer Lütfü Topal added a further seventeen million. However, after receiving the money, he then went on to have them kidnapped and killed, and sometimes tortured beforehand.

=== Corruption ===
Following the collapse of her government, allegations of corruption were filed against Çiller, included among the many charges was that she interfered in the privatization of the state run corporations Tofaş and Tedaş by demanding that she should read the sealed bids that prospective companies put forward. These bids were later given back to the privatization board and were found to be opened, presumably allowing Çiller the opportunity to financially benefit from the privatization. In addition she allegedly used discretionary funds allocated to the prime ministry for her personal benefit, and refused to reveal to President Demirel or to future Prime Minister Mesut Yılmaz what they were used for, using the excuse of "national security."

Her popularity also suffered when Milliyet ran an exposé of her undeclared properties in the United States. A motion to investigate Çiller's assets was rejected in the parliament. She announced that she would donate her property to the Martyr Zübeyde Hanım Mother's Foundation before the 1995 election, but never followed through with this.

=== Foreign Policy ===
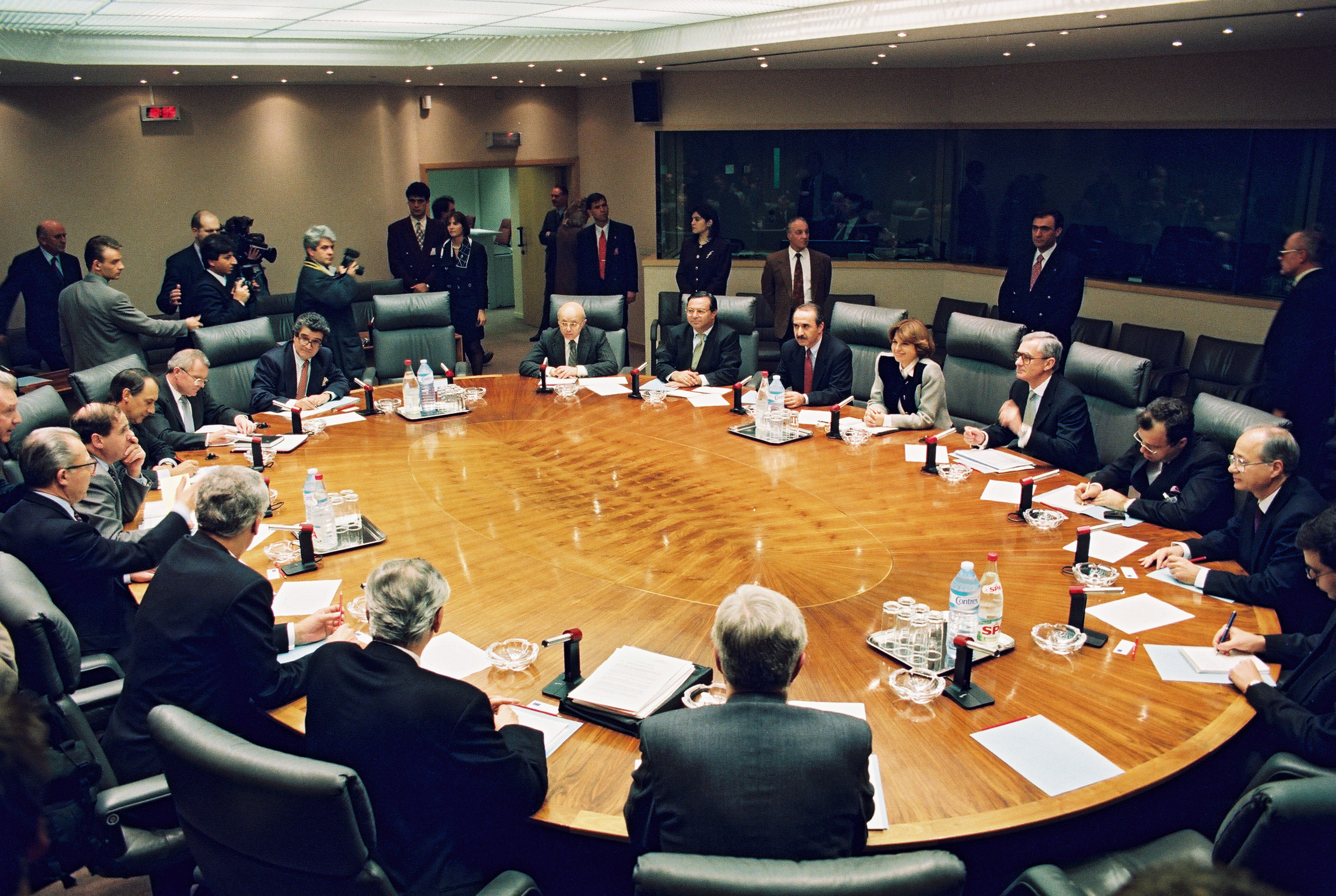
Meeting between Turkish delegation and EU delegation, led by Tansu Çiller and Jacques Delors respectively

The EU-Turkey Customs Union agreement was signed in 1995 and came into effect in 1996 during Çiller's government.

In March 1995, the 1995 Azeri coup d'état attempt took place; official reports following the 1996 Susurluk scandal suggested Çiller and others in cabinet had supported the coup attempt, which aimed to reinstall Ebulfeyz Elçibey as president.

Çiller was prime minister during the January 1996 Imia/Kardak crisis with neighbouring Greece. As deputy Prime Minister under Erbakan's premiership, Çiller declared that if Greece tried to divide Albania, it would have the Turkish Army in Athens 24 hours later.

She was the first Turkish Prime Minister to visit Israel as well as meet with Yaser Arafat.

== 1995 election and Ana-Yol government ==
After the withdrawal of the Republican People's Party (CHP) from the coalition in October 1995 (the SHP had split, merged, and renamed itself) Çiller attempted to form a minority government with confidence and supply from the Nationalist Movement Party (MHP), which failed in less than a month (51st government of Turkey). She agreed to form another cabinet (52nd government of Turkey) with the CHP in the lead up to 1995 general election. Çiller employed nationalist and secularist rhetoric in the party's first election with her as party chair. DYP received a resounding defeat, losing 30% of its support from 1991.

Coalition negotiations were protracted, and Çiller remained in office at the head of the DYP-CHP coalition until March 1996, when the DYP formed an unstable coalition with ANAP and the Democratic Left Party (DSP) supplying confidence, with Mesut Yılmaz becoming prime minister, and herself Alternate Prime Minister. Necmettin Erbakan filed suit in the Constitutional Court when the government succeeded in a vote of confidence with only a plurality, not a majority –Bülent Ecevit's DSP voted to abstain in the end. Çiller found herself boxed in from two directions: the Grand National Assembly voted to investigate allegations of corruption against her in a vote in which opposition parties –even her coalition partners– supported, and the Constitutional Court ruled that the government's vote of confidence was unconstitutional. Prime Minister Yılmaz resigned 6 June, ending the ANAYOL government.

== Refah-Yol government and MGK memorandum ==
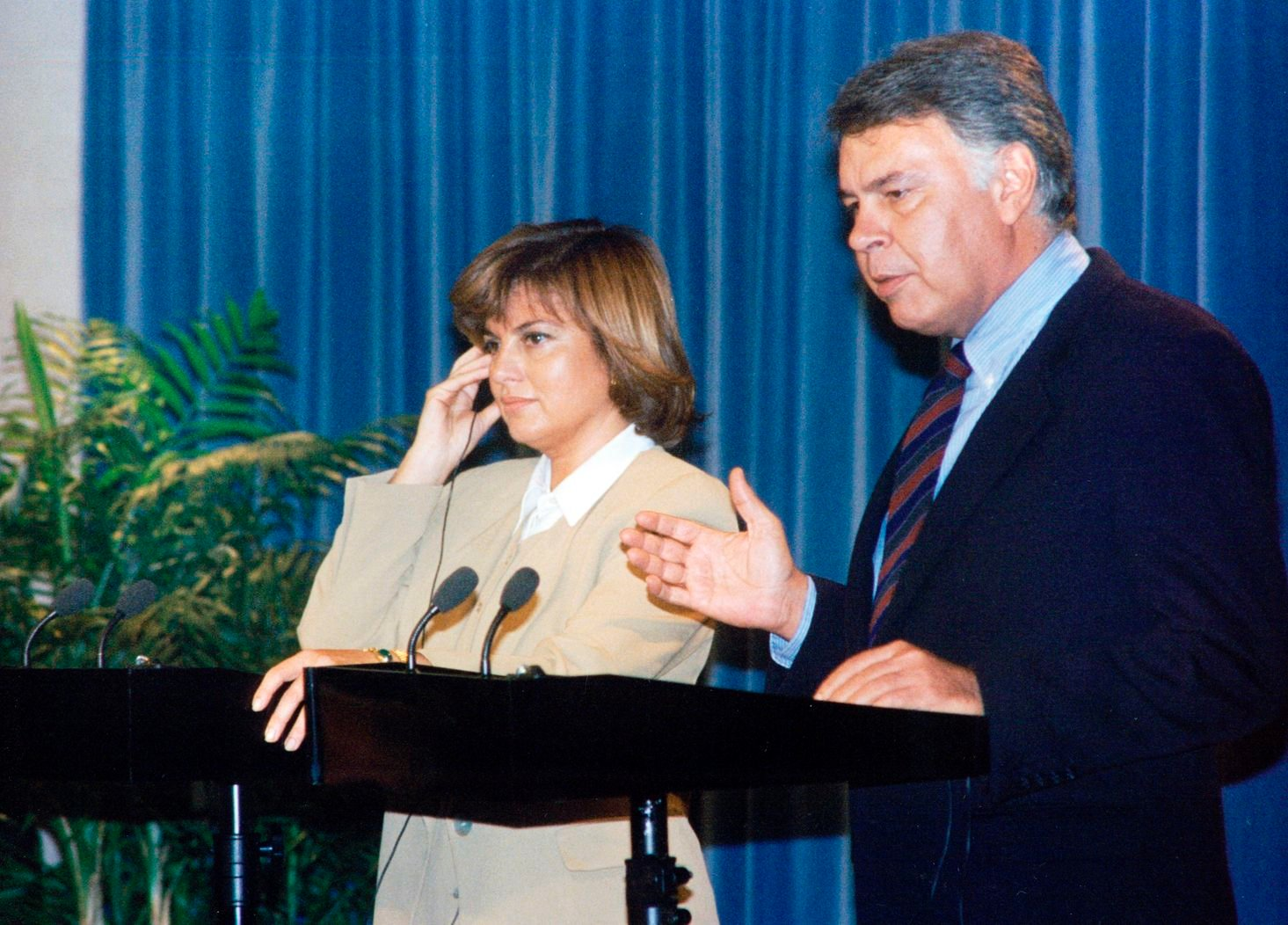
Tansu Çiller and Felipe González in Palace of Moncloa

After the Motherland–DYP coalition collapsed in June 1996, the DYP formed a historic coalition with the Welfare Party (RP), under Necmettin Erbakan, with Çiller as minister of foreign affairs, deputy prime minister, and alternate prime minister. This coalition was controversial, not only did an openly Islamist politician become premier for the first time in the history of the Turkish Republic, but Çiller lost credibility for joining forces with those she most criticized on the campaign trail. Whatever Çiller and Erbakan said of each other in the past was history, both were isolated and needed each other to survive. Çiller needed a coalition partner to keep a parliamentary majority from lifting her and her allies' immunities to investigate her corruption charges, while Erbakan needed the same so as to fight his ideological struggle against the secularist Turkish military.

In an eight (Welfare and DYP members) to seven vote, the Parliamentary Investigation Commission decided that her misuse of public funds on Tofaş and Tedaş tenders had no need to be reviewed by the Constitutional Court. The coalition with Welfare has been interpreted as a quid pro quo for Çiller's acquittal. She was reelected chairwoman of DYP in a party congress, but Hüsamettin Çindoruk quit with several DYP deputies to form the Democrat Turkey Party (DTP).

=== Susurluk ===
After the November 1996 Susurluk car crash, which resulted in a scandal that demonstrated the close ties that the government, security services, organized crime, and far-right groups had with each other, she praised Abdullah Çatlı, who died in the crash, saying: "Those who fire bullets or suffer their wounds in the name of this country, this nation, and this state will always be respectfully remembered by us." The Citizens' Initiative for Eternal Light lead a series of protests against the government for its links with organized crime groups. Interior Minister Mehmet Ağar resigned following the scandal, and was replaced by Meral Akşener.

=== 1997 "post-modern" coup ===
The Turkish Armed Forces eyed the coalition with great suspicion, but Çiller hoped that her secular credentials and strong relationship with the military could ease tensions. She positioned herself as an intermediate between the secularist military and the Islamist Welfare Party. However, by the beginning of 1997, relations between the government and the military were increasingly strained, especially after a Welfare mayor of Sincan hosted the Iranian Ambassador who gave a speech in support of Sharia Law (See Jerusalem Meeting). The military subsequently displayed a show of strength by driving a tank convoy through Sincan a few days later.

After a nine-hour National Security Council meeting held on 28 February 1997, a set of demands were presented to the Refah-Yol government to combat what the military called İrtica (reactionarism). Çiller's relationship with the military completely broke down. She saw that the military was determined to overthrow the government, and recommended retiring the chief of staff and force commanders, but this was blocked by a calmer Erbakan. Çiller and Akşener were successful in sacking the Chief of National Police and getting his replacement to wiretap high ranking generals of the Turkish Armed Forces. One general learning that he was being wiretapped by the Interior Ministry threatened to "impale her [Akşener] like a goose." (quoted as "tell that woman [Akşener], if we go over there we will impale her on a greasy stake")

With resignations of DYP ministers from the government and pressure from the military, Erbakan resigned, and the "post-modern coup" concluded on 30 June 1997. DYP and others expected to form a government under Çiller, but President Demirel disregarded the rotation agreement and asked ANAP leader Yılmaz to form the new government instead. While Erbakan's fall from power condemned his political career until the end of his life, Çiller's was also effectively over. Her maneuvers, political excuses, failed policies, and scandals made her very unpopular. Almost one-third of her party didn't join in voting with her against the confidence vote of Yılmaz's new government. 35 women's organizations took her to court because she lacked feminist principles. She was also criticized for undermining democracy and threatening journalists.

== Fall from politics ==
Çiller was investigated by the Turkish Parliament on serious corruption charges and abuses of power following her period in government. Along with Mesut Yılmaz, she was later cleared of all charges mainly due to technicalities such as statute of limitations and parliamentary immunity. Near the end of 1998, the corruption files about Yılmaz and Çiller were covered up at the commissions of the parliament in a common action staged by DYP, ANAP and DSP MPs. In the 1999 general election she presented herself as a leader of the downtrodden and the religious, pausing her campaign speeches during the prayer of Adhan, or demanding that women with their headscarves on should attend university. Her party polled at only about 12%. She was still reelected DYP's chairwoman in a party conference later that year, and became Leader of the Main Opposition with the closure of Erbakan's Virtue Party and the split in the Milli Görüş movement.

Çiller's political career came to its end when her party narrowly failed to poll above the 10% threshold in the 2002 general election, thus receiving no representation in parliament despite her role as Leader of Main Opposition for more than two years. In a press conference she announced her retirement from politics, and was succeeded by Mehmet Ağar.

== Later career ==
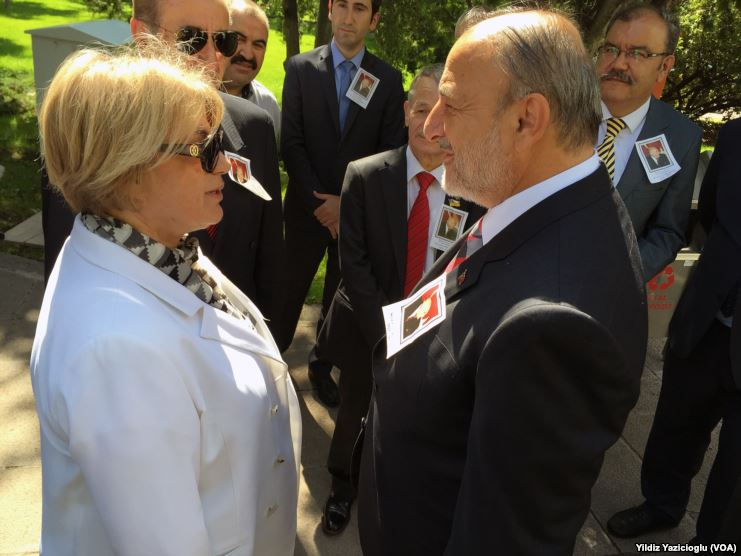
Tansu Çiller (age 69) and Oktay Vural (age 59) at Süleyman Demirel's funeral (18 June 2015)

Çiller is a member of the Council of Women World Leaders, an international network of current and former women presidents and prime ministers whose mission is to mobilize the highest-level women leaders globally for collective action on issues of critical importance to women and equitable development.

In 2018, Çiller attended a Justice and Development Party rally in support of Recep Tayyip Erdoğan's candidacy for that year's presidential election.

In February 2024, she endorsed Murat Kurum for 2024 Istanbul mayoral election.

== Personal life ==
In addition to Turkish, Çiller can speak English and German fluently. She has two children with her husband, Özer Uçuran Çiller, who died of a heart attack at his home in Yeniköy, Istanbul, on 1 June 2024, at the age of 86.

== See also ==
- Türkan Akyol
- Women in Turkish politics
- Female political leaders in Islam and in Muslim-majority countries

Party political offices
Preceded by Süleyman Demirel	Leader of the True Path Party; 1993–2002	Succeeded by Mehmet Ağar
Political offices
Preceded by Süleyman Demirel	Prime Minister of Turkey; 1993–1996	Succeeded by Mesut Yılmaz
Preceded by Nahit Menteşe	Deputy Prime Minister of Turkey; 1996–1997	Succeeded by İsmet Sezgin
Preceded by Emre Gönensay	Minister of Foreign Affairs; 1996–1997	Succeeded by İsmail Cem
