= Monument of the Martyrs of Internal Security =

Memorial

Details
- Established: 1997
- Location: Kırklartepe, Erzincan, Erzincan Province
- Country: Turkey
- No. of graves: 1887

Monument of the Martyrs of Internal Security is a memorial and military cemetery in the Erzincan Province, Turkey dedicated to 1,887 Turkish troops under the Third Army killed during the PKK insurgency. Names of all 1,887 dead soldiers are written on the walls of the monument.
