= Abdülkadir Aygan =

Turkish Gendarmerie (born 1958)

- Born: 1958 (age 67–68); Uzunhıdır, Suruç, Şanlıurfa Province
- Known for: Former member of the Kurdistan Workers' Party (PKK)

Abdülkadir Aygan (born Uzunhıdır, Suruç, Şanlıurfa Province, 1958) is a former member of the Kurdistan Workers' Party (PKK) and of the Turkish Gendarmerie's JITEM intelligence unit. He has been described as "the most well-known among PKK members turned informants". He is a refugee in Sweden since 2001, where he has been cooperating with prosecutors in the Ergenekon trials.

== Life ==
Aygan joined the PKK in 1977. He had previously been shot in clashes with ultranationalists, and been visited in hospital by Abdullah Öcalan, a relative of his. He was captured in 1980, and released after 18 months. During military service on Cyprus in 1982, he fled, eventually to Germany and then Syria. From 1983 to 1985 he acted as a PKK courier in northern Iraq. After witnessing the brutal execution of a suspected spy, he fled the PKK and surrendered to the Turkish military.

He was interrogated by Cem Ersever among others, and convinced by Ersever to join the JITEM. He became part of a seven-person JITEM team led by Ersever, and was given a new identity, Aziz Turan, while Aygan was officially declared dead. Turan was employed as a clerk by the Turkish Gendarmerie. During his tenure with JITEM Aygan is said to have been involved in "making blacklists of people [and] kidnappings, torture, hostage-taking, murder, extortion, theft and smuggling". He describes JITEM's headquarters in Ankara as a large two-storey building, with Turkish Gendarmerie personnel working in civilian clothes and vehicles.

Aygan resigned on 12 September 2001, and fled to Sweden, where he was granted asylum with his family. As part of the Ergenekon trials, Aygan has shared his knowledge of 58 murders with the prosecution, including those of Musa Anter, Vedat Aydın and Uğur Mumcu.
