= İstanbul Bank =

- Type: Bank
- Industry: Banking
- Founded: 1953
- Defunct: 24 November 1983
- Headquarters: Istanbul, Turkey
- Products: Financial services
- Parent: Ziraat Bank

İstanbul Bank (Turkish: İstanbul Bankası) was a Turkish bank. It was founded in 1953 with a founding capital of TL 30,000,000. It had the shares of Erdemir and Güneş Sigorta (insurance company). Between 1979 and 1983 it was the sponsor of Yenişehir S.K. (sports club). It was merged to Ziraat Bank on 24 November 1983.
