= Şemdin Sakık =

Kurdish militant commander (born 1959)

- Born: 1959 (age 66–67); Muş, Turkey
- Citizenship: Turkey
- Relatives: Sırrı Sakık (brother)
- Status: In prison
- Conviction: Responsible for 1993 PKK attack in Bingöl
- Penalty: Life imprisonment

Details
- Imprisoned at: Diyarbakır Prison
- Military career
- Allegiance: Kurdistan Workers' Party
- Service years: 1980–1998
- Rank: Commander
- Nicknames: Şemo; Parmaksız Zeki
- Conflicts: Kurdish–Turkish conflict

Şemdin Sakık (born 1959), also known by his nom de guerre Şemo or Parmaksız Zeki (lit. 'Zeki the Fingerless'), is a Kurdish militant commander, former senior Kurdistan Workers' Party (PKK) member. He is best known for ordering the May 24, 1993 PKK ambush. He has been imprisoned since his capture in Iraqi Kurdistan by Turkish forces in 1998, shortly after his defection to the Kurdistan Democratic Party. He was a key witness in the Ergenekon trials.

== Background ==
In statements to the Ergenekon trials in 2012, he said that he became a PKK sympathizer in 1979, and joined after the 1980 Turkish coup d'état as a way of leaving the country after a dispute with his father in which he shot and wounded him.

His brother Sırrı Sakık was a member of the Grand National Assembly of Turkey for the Peace and Democracy Party (BDP).

Within the PKK, he was also known for his opposition to the recruitment of women.

== Bingöl massacre ==
Sakık later claimed that military commanders were aware of his planned Bingöl massacre, and deliberately left the soldiers unarmed and unguarded. He identified a group within the military called the East Study Group (Doğu Çalışma Grubu), saying it had used the ambush as part of its coup plans. Abdullah Öcalan claims Sakık ordered the 1993 ambush as part of an Ergenekon attempt to sabotage the peace process then ongoing between the PKK and the Turkish government, saying that Sakık had been used by Ergenekon.

== Defection and capture ==
In the late 90s, he had an argument with the other commanders within the PKK, such as Duran Kalkan and Murat Karıyilan in which he told them they were not experienced enough in warfare. He himself was known for his warfare skills, and there was not much what they could do about it except complaining about to Öcalan. This led to a tense power struggle within the PKK. Then in 1998, he was ordered by Öcalan to lead the PKK in the Hatay province, an area not suitable for PKK guerrilla warfare as it was in a leveled environment. He therefore refused to enter deeply into the province and stayed with his troops just at the border. Öcalan then called him back to Damascus, and as he refused to obey his orders, later sent him into detention to the Gare camp in the Dohuk Governorate, Iraqi Kurdistan. From there he escaped and was received by Masoud Barzani who provided him protection. But the Turkish armed forces were made aware of his presence in the region, and captured him on 13 April 1998. Despite denials, the KDP aided Turkish commandos during the capture.

Some sources said that the 1998 Operation Murat, launched shortly after Sakık's capture, was based in part on information obtained from Sakık. He was prosecuted and sentenced to death being involved in the killing of 125 members of the security forces and 121 civilians, but the sentence was commuted to life imprisonment following Turkeys abolition of the death penalty.

== Ergenekon testimony ==
Initially serving as secret witness in the Ergenekon Trials he later gave up on his anonymity voluntarily. The military leaders prosecuted in the trials were opposed to the fact that a former PKK leader would testify against them. Sakık says that Iran took back weapons it had provided to the PKK after the PKK declared a ceasefire in 1993. He said that Veli Küçük gave training to PKK militants. He also claimed that the PKK had prior notice of the 1980 coup.

Sakık has written a book about supposed PKK's executions of internal dissidents - people who challenged the leadership or later renounced violence - which he says amounts to about 2000 people.

Former Secretary-General of the National Security Council Tuncer Kılınç has been reported as saying that Sakık's word could be trusted.

== Books ==
- Apo, Şark Yayınları, 2005.
- Şemdin Sakık anlatıyor : Kobralar üzerimize gelince aklımızı kaçırıyorduk / Tuncer Günay, Doğan Kitap 2007.
- Eski Bir Militanın Kaleminden Şiddetin Sefaleti, Lagin Yayınları / Araştırma-İnceleme Dizisi 2010
- İhanetin Tarihi, Yakın Plan Yayınları / Türkiye Siyaseti Dizisi 2010
- İmralı'da Bir Tiran: Abdullah Öcalan, Togan Yayıncılık 2012
