= May 24, 1993, PKK attack =

Massacre in Turkey

24 May 1993 PKK attack
- Part of Kurdish–Turkish conflict
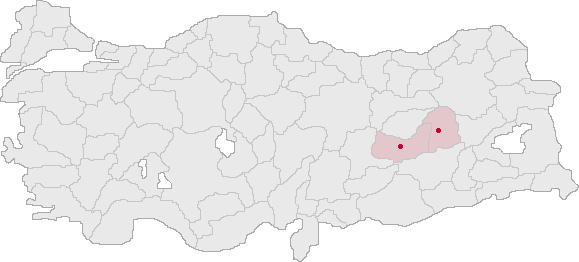
- Locations of Elazığ and Bingöl Turkey
Date	24 May 1993
Location	Elazığ-Bingöl highway
Result	PKK victory

Belligerents
Turkey	Kurdistan Workers' Party (PKK)

Commanders and leaders
	Şemdin Sakık

Strength
33 unarmed soldiers	150 militants

Casualties and losses
33 soldiers and 2–5 civilians 22 soldiers briefly captured	None

The 24 May 1993 PKK attack, sometimes referred to as the Bingöl massacre was a Kurdistan Workers Party (PKK) attack on unarmed Turkish military soldiers on the Elazığ-Bingöl highway, 13 km (8.1 mi) west of Bingöl. 33 Turkish soldiers and varying conflicting accounts of civilians were killed (two, four, five). This occurred following the breaking of the first ever PKK-Turkish ceasefire when Turkish forces attacked the PKK in Kulp.

== Background ==
In late 1991, Turkish president Turgut Özal attempted to establish dialogue with the PKK. He had said the idea of a federation could be discussed and a Kurdish language TV channel could be opened. He also passed a bill, partially unbanning the use of the Kurdish language. In response the PKK declared a cease-fire on 20 March 1993. On 17 April 1993 Turgut Özal died under suspicious circumstances. The Turkish military began to increase their attacks on the PKK, in particular on 19 May, in Kulp killing around a dozen rebels. Under the control of the provincial commander of the area at the time, Şemdin Sakık reported to Abdullah Öcalan that the soldiers were losing respect. Öcalan responded by stating you may retaliate if attacked to defend yourself, unaware of what would be planned.

== The attack ==
Sakık decided on a show of strength, ordering units to block all main roads to the Diyarbakir which was a favored operation by the rebels as it asserted authority. Due to the remoteness of some of these stretches of highway, the Turkish military were not eager to confront the PKK so sometimes sent off-duty soldiers via unmarked buses to avoid being targeted or identified at any roadblock.

One of these roads was the Elazığ-Bingöl highway which was allegedly defended by over 150 PKK militants, who had come down from the mountains to the southeast. The PKK stopped several buses transferring unarmed Turkish soldiers in civilian clothes, and then dragged 33 soldiers and five civilians (including four teachers) from the vehicles and executed them. Some 22 soldiers were spared by the PKK and taken prisoner, before being released. The military was criticized for the fact that the soldiers were unarmed and there were no units protecting them. Sakık, later captured by the Turkish security forces, testified during the Ergenekon trials that deep state elements in the Turkish military had sent the soldiers unarmed in the hope they would be killed, as part of the Doğu Çalışma Grubu's coup plans.

== Aftermath ==
On the 8 June 1993, Abdullah Öcalan announced the cease fire it declared in March was over. The Turkish military intensified its anti-insurgency operations against the PKK during the following months. A total of 92 Turkish security forces, 203 ARGK militants (PKK's military wing) and 29 civilians were killed during anti-insurgency operations in May and June, an additional 120 people were arrested during these operations.

Turkish claimed that Parmaksız Zeki, the PKK's commander in Muş at the time, described the attack as a turning point in the conflict, as the state stepped up its operations against the PKK and "the war got much worse".

== Legacy ==
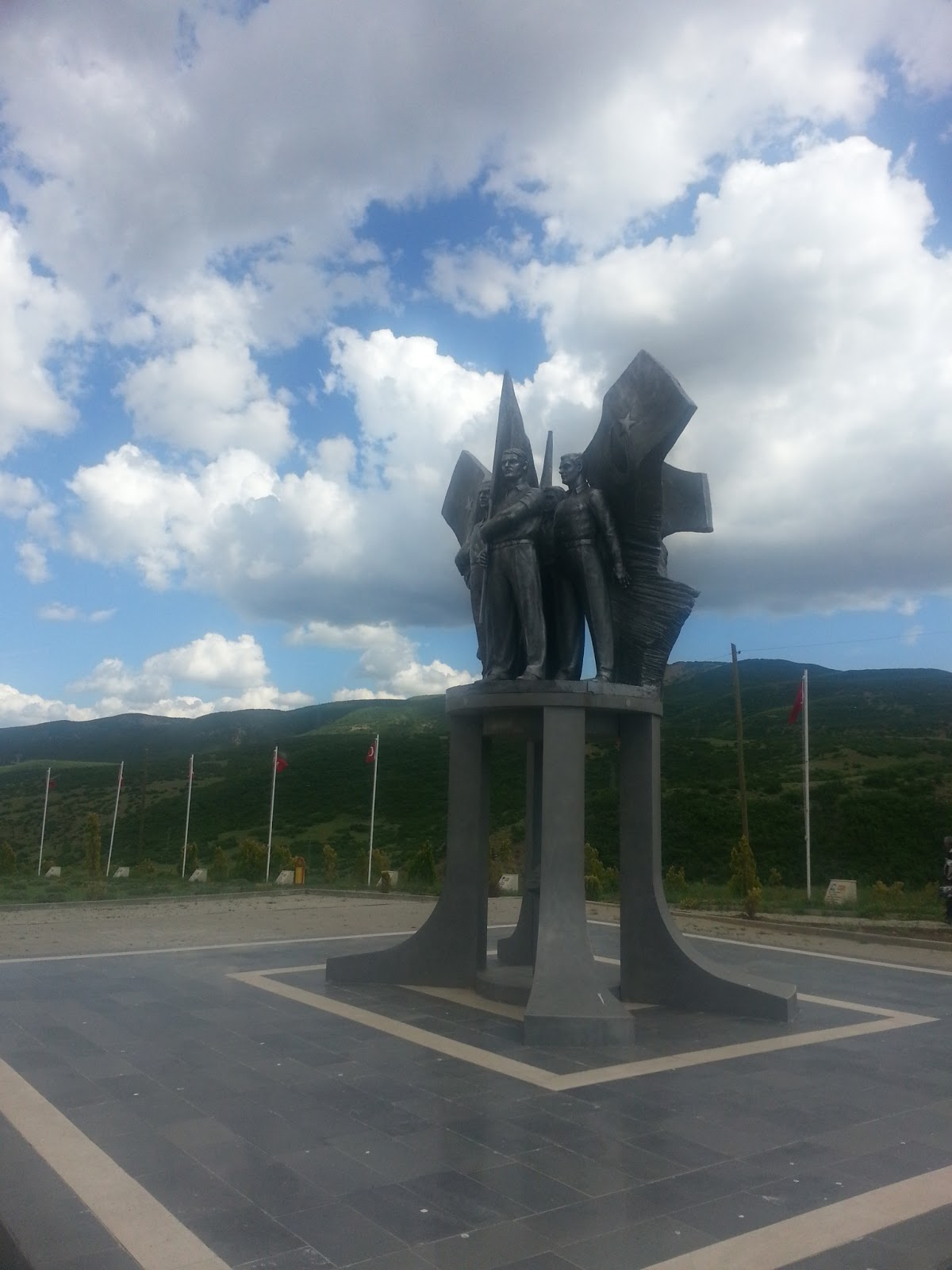
33 Martyrs Memorial

On 24 May 2012, the 33 Martyrs Memorial near Bingöl was dedicated to the 33 victims of the attack.
