= Gendarmerie Intelligence Organization =

Intelligence service of the Turkish Gendarmerie General Command

Gendarmerie Intelligence Organization Gendarmerie Intelligence and Counter-Terrorism
- Jandarma İstihbarat Teşkilatı; Jandarma İstihbarat ve Terörle Mücadele
- Active: Late 1980s – present (unofficially, as JİTEM); 2005 – present (officially, as JİT)
- Country: Turkey
- Branch: Gendarmerie General Command
- Type: Intelligence agency

The Gendarmerie Intelligence Organization (Turkish: Jandarma İstihbarat Teşkilatı, JİT) or the Gendarmerie Intelligence and Counter-Terrorism (Jandarma İstihbarat ve Terörle Mücadele, JİTEM) is the intelligence department of the Turkish Gendarmerie. JİTEM was active in the Kurdish–Turkish conflict. After the Susurluk scandal, former prime ministers Bülent Ecevit and Mesut Yılmaz have confirmed the existence of JİTEM.

According to Murat Belge of Istanbul Bilgi University, who has reported that he was tortured in 1971 by its founder, Veli Küçük, JİTEM is an embodiment of the deep state. In other words, it is used by "the Establishment" to enforce alleged national interests. It is also said to be the military wing of Ergenekon, an underground Turkish nationalist organization. In 2008, long-maintained official denials of JİTEM's existence started collapsing in the courts, as ex-members of Turkey's "deep state" security apparatus testify to their participation in covert and illegal activities over the last few decades as part of the ongoing Ergenekon investigation.

== History ==
=== Background ===
The unit was officially founded in 2005, but its unofficial history goes back to the 1980s. Its roots lie further back with the Counter-Guerrilla: JİTEM used Counter-Guerrilla methods and possibly equipment, and key figures had been involved with the Counter-Guerrilla. For example, Murat Belge of Istanbul Bilgi University says he was tortured in 1971 by a key JİTEM figure, Veli Küçük.

=== Unofficial (1980s–2005) ===
JİTEM was active in the Kurdish–Turkish conflict.

It has repeatedly been claimed that JİTEM was dissolved. One of the first was Prime Minister Mesut Yılmaz. He stated on 22 January 1998 on the Arena program on Kanal D hosted by Uğur Dündar that JİTEM did not exist any longer. When İsmail Hakkı Karadayı assumed the role of chief of general staff, (30 August 1994 – 30 August 1998), news stating the dissolution of JİTEM were leaked to the press. The last declaration about JİTEM's dissolution came in 2004 from the former Commander of the Gendarmerie in the State of Emergency Region (Olağanüstü Hal, OHAL), retired Lieutenant- General Altay Tokat. Tokat stated in his interview with the newspaper Zaman that JİTEM was a “public disclosure of an intelligence unit that fought against the PKK in the OHAL region” and that it had “fulfilled its role and was dissolved".

The former chair of Diyarbakır Bar Association, Sezgin Tanrıkulu, however claims that JİTEM was not dissolved, but the cadres were not active at the moment.

=== Official (2005–present) ===
JİTEM was made a legal entity through Article 5 of the Law 2803 on the Establishment, Duties and Jurisdiction of Gendarmerie and Article 4 of the Law Concerning the Transfer of Our Borders, Coasts and Territorial Waters' Protection and Anti-Smuggling Activities to the Ministry of Internal Affairs No. 6815.

The gendarmerie intelligence, previously known as JİTEM or JİT, finally gained legal status with the Law Concerning Amendments to Some Laws No. 5397, accepted on 3 July 2005, effective since 23 July 2005 thus becoming the Gendarmerie Intelligence Department within the General Command of Gendarmerie. This law authorised the gendarmerie to carry out technical stakeouts.

== Investigation history ==
=== 1993–1996 ===
The first person to write about JİTEM was journalist Ayşe Önal for the Ateş newspaper on 2 July 1994. Önal had learned about it from Veli Küçük after being introduced to him through MIT spy and fellow journalist, Tuncay Güney. Önal and Küçük's meeting did not go well, and Önal vowed to write about it. She followed through, and was promptly fired, along with nineteen of her coworkers.

Findings about JİTEM and Ersever were also published by researchers and journalists. One of the first and most detailed of these was by Soner Yalçın. Yalçın managed to interview Cem Ersever, subsequently publishing the interviews in his book Binbaşı Ersever'in İtirafları ("Confessions of Major Ersever").

=== Susurluk scandal ===
JİTEM was subjected to parliamentary scrutiny during the Susurluk scandal, when commanders in the Gendarmerie repeatedly denied the existence of an overarching intelligence organization within the Gendarmerie. Susurluk commission member Fikri Sağlar said that the commanders denied its existence because the Gendarmerie formally acquired the legal capacity to conduct intelligence operations in 2005 (with Law 5397). The author of the Prime Ministry Inspection Board report, Kutlu Savaş, said JİTEM was created on Gendarmerie Commander Hulusi Sayın's watch (1981–1985). The Parliamentary Investigation Committee's report on Unsolved Political Murders in Various Regions of Our Country (10/90) dated 12 October 1995 and the summary by Istanbul National Security Court General Prosecutor dated 30 January 1997 are also worthy of consideration.

Investigations into the 1996 Susurluk scandal revealed some role for JİTEM. Former prime ministers Bülent Ecevit, and Mesut Yılmaz accepted the existence of JİTEM.

Seven months after the release of the Susurluk Report, a book entitled: Cem Ersever ve JİTEM Gerçeği ("Cem Ersever and the JİTEM Fact"), written by journalist Çetin Ağaşe, a friend of the Ersever family, was published. The appendix of the book contains documents such as the 1994 phone directory of the General Command of Gendarmerie, which contained the numbers of the JİTEM Group Commander and JİTEM units in each city. This was further proof of JİTEM's official existence and of Ersever's position within the chain of command.

=== Abdülkadir Aygan ===
Revelations have recently come from an informant named Abdülkadir Aygan (a former PKK member recruited by JİTEM, now a political refugee in Sweden) that it was founded by retired general Veli Küçük, who is currently arrested in the Ergenekon investigations. Other people allegedly involved in its founding are Ahmet Cem Ersever, Arif Doğan, Hasan Kundakçı, Hüseyin Kara, Hulusi Sayın and Aytekin Özen, according to Aygan. Küçük confirmed Aygan's allegations about his cofounding the organization.

=== Arif Doğan ===
After being taken into custody, Arif Doğan admitted to being a founder of the organization, originally known as the Intelligence Group Command (Turkish: İstihbarat Grup Komutanlığı), and that in 1990 he handed the reins to Veli Küçük. In 2005 he had denied the very existence of such an organization. After his release from prison Arif Doğan spoke to journalists of the news channel Habertürk TV in September 2010 and said that he alone had founded JİTEM and had "frozen" it in 1990. Concerning the structure of JİTEM Colonel Arif Doğan said: "My staff was 10,000, including 620 women. They participated in operations and got 3,000 Lira for each head."

According to figures of the Justice Ministry about 1,950 PKK militants became confessors after arrest. Unofficial figures put the number of confessors that were used and paid in the fight against the PKK at 500.

== Modus operandi ==
Among the alleged members are ex-PKK-operatives (Turkish: İtirafçı), besides non-commissioned officers and a few officers of the Gendarmerie. While Aygan listed several units as part of JİTEM such as the Gendarmerie General Command, the Intelligence Command, the Joint Group Command, the Regional Group Commands (of which there are seven), the Team Commands and small clandestine cells the lawyer Tahir Elçi, who is acting on behalf of victims of JİTEM said:
"It is not possible to completely know the organizational structure of JİTEM; but it is understood that it was organized within the Gendarmerie, the centre being in Ankara and having group commands mostly in the South-East within the Regimental Commands of the provinces. They took their orders from the centre in Ankara and conducted three folded activities: gather intelligence, interrogate and carry out operations."

JİTEM carried out its activities using the "staff system" (eleman sistemi) and technical stakeout approaches. The information gathered was analysed, became intelligence and submitted to the Intelligence Group Command. Every report was assembled by the Intelligence Group Command and operation teams were dispatched accordingly.

== Actions ==
=== Fight against PKK ===
JİTEM was founded to counter the guerilla tactics of the PKK, but its units never directly clashed with armed groups of the PKK in the rural areas. They made use of PKK confessors (itirafçı) to kill PKK adherents, raid villages in guerilla dressing, detain, torture or make people "disappear". Intelligence units did not have the necessary mechanisms in place to fight the PKK in open country. The inefficiency in the intelligence network made it impossible for land forces to perform specific operations, to prevent terror raids and to develop a strategy against PKK front activities.

The spokesperson of the Movement of Kurdish Democrats Ahmet Acar alleged that JİTEM fomented infighting in the PKK, while ensuring the perpetuation of both of the PKK, and by extension, itself. Kurdish-Turkish politician Abdülmelik Fırat maintained that JİTEM is connected to the PKK, while fighting it at the same time.

=== Political killings ===
Numerous people who claim to be or are purported to be JİTEM operatives have been accused of crimes such as kidnapping, intimidation, and extra-judicial killings of PKK members. Former JİTEM operative Aygan estimated that 80% of these killings were done by JİTEM. JİTEM interrogators are especially brutal since they belong to an organization that ostensibly does not exist, and hence they are not accountable. Aygan says that detainees are invariably killed. He provided about 30 names of victims.

Tuncay Güney, a former spy for the National Intelligence Organization who infiltrated JİTEM, alleged that Veli Küçük's men, working for JİTEM, killed people using acid and buried the corpses in wells belonging to the state-owned Turkish Pipeline Corporation, BOTAŞ. Some have responded to the Şırnak Bar's request for witnesses and families of victims to step forward. Ergenekon defendant Levent Ersöz has also been named in connection with the incidents, in Silopi.

There are no clear figures on the number of political killings in South-East Anatolia. According to intelligence units, 1550 unsolved murders were committed between 1990 and 2000 although the PKK claims that the accurate number exceeds 2000. The Human Rights Association estimates that between 1989 and 2008 JİTEM was involved in 5000 unsolved killings of journalists, human rights defenders, intellectuals and political activists and was responsible for 1,500 cases of "disappearances". Former chair of Diyarbakır Bar Association Sezgin Tanrıkulu put the figures above 4,000, close to 5,000. He stated that one JİTEM operative, Ibrahim Babat, alone had been charged with 61 killings. In a documentary by Mehmet Hatman the figure of 4653 unsolved political killings between 1991 and 2000 was mentioned.

=== High-profile killings ===
Some murders received a lot of press coverage.

==== Vedat Aydın ====
Vedat Aydın, the Diyarbakır branch chairman of the now-defunct People's Labor Party (HEP), was found dead on a road near Malatya on 7 July 1991, two days after armed men had taken him from his home in Diyarbakir. The widow Sükran Aydın thinks her husband's murder was a turning point and that there was a sudden increase in the number of unsolved murders in the country's Southeast following his death. She believes that a clandestine unit within the gendarmerie was responsible for the murder. Only 18 years after the killing the public prosecutor in Diyarbakir opened a file seeking the detention of nine JİTEM members including the Major Aytekin Özen.

==== Musa Anter ====
Aygan said he had been part of a unit, alongside Cem Ersever and Arif Doğan, which had assassinated 72-year-old Kurdish writer Musa Anter in 1992 in Diyarbakır. Turkey was found guilty of this murder in 2006 by the European Convention on Human Rights, which fined Turkey for 28,500 euros.

==== Ahmet Cem Ersever ====
Former JİTEM commander Cem Ersever was assassinated in November 1993. Aygan alleges that Arif Doğan and Veli Küçük's superiors in Ankara ordered the assassination in order to take control of JİTEM from Ersever.

=== Drugs and weapons trafficking ===
JİTEM's chief, Arif Doğan, was tried in the frame of the Yüksekova Gang (aka "the gang with uniforms"). According to Today's Zaman, the "Yüksekova Gang was an illegal organization formed in the Yüksekova district of Hakkari, headed by three high-ranking military personnel and various politicians that smuggled drugs and weapons." Its activities were first revealed in 1996, in the aftermath of the Susurluk scandal. Its activities "are only one part of the JİTEM activities" that have been sent to the European Court of Human Rights (ECHR). All of the local court prison sentences concerning the Yüksekova Gang were cancelled by the High Court of Appeals of Turkey, leading the ECHR to fine Turkey 103,000 Euro for its decisions about the Yüksekova Gang.

Relying on a document as an attachment to the indictment in the Ergenekon case Fırat News Agency presented background on smuggling of JİTEM staff between 1981 and 1990. Details were mentioned on arms trafficking, drug smuggling, and cross border trafficking of electronic devices.

== Court cases with JİTEM involvement ==
İlhan Cihaner, prosecutor in İdil (Şırnak province) was the first to point at JİTEM in an indictment of 1997. He held the defendants including civil servants, İtirafçı confessors and others responsible for killings, bombings and "disappearances". Defendant No. 1 was Ahmet Cem Ersever and defendant No. 2 was Arif Doğan.

An indictment prepared by Diyarbakır Public Prosecutor Mithat Özcan dated 29 March 2005 charged eight PKK İtirafçı confessors, namely Mahmut Yıldırım (aka Yeşil), Abdülkadir Aygan, Muhsin Gül, Fethi Çetin, Kemal Emlük, Saniye Emlük, Yüksel Uğur and Abdülkerim Kırca. These people were suspected of being JİTEM members and were charged with eight unsolved murders, namely the murders of Harbi Arman, Lokman Zuğurli, Zana Zuğurli, Servet Aslan, Şahabettin Latifeci, Ahmet Ceylan, Mehmet Sıddık Etyemez and Abdülkadir Çelikbilek between the years 1992–1994. The case was transferred to a military court. The court case went through different stages. In September 2010 the number of defendants had risen to 15. During the hearing at Diyarbakir Heavy Penal Court No. 6 of 3 September 2010 the defendants Ali Ozansoy and Adil Timurtaş (both confessors) were present for the first time. Earlier the Ministry of Interior had refused to inform the Court of the new names of the defendants.

Mehmet Şerif Avşar was abducted in Diyarbakir on 22 April 1994 and two weeks later found dead. The kidnappers, PKK confessor Mesut Mehmetoğlu and village guards hid in a building reportedly belonging to JİTEM. On 20 March 2001 six defendants were convicted for their involvement in the killing. The case was raised with the European Court of Human Rights (ECtHR). The court found a violation of Article 2 of the European Convention of Human Rights.

Abdülkadir Aygan is one of the 11 or 12 defendants charged with having killed Hacı Ahmet Zeyrek (in Silopi 1989), JİTEM staff member Mehmet Bayar (25 June 1990) and Tahsin Sevim, Hasan Utanç and Hasan Caner on 16 September 1989. A criminal court in Diyarbakır ruled in 2006 that the defendants were military personnel and should be tried in a military court.

According to the report of Kutlu Savaş PKK İtirafçı confessor Hayrettin Toka had been involved in many killings of JİTEM. He was apprehended in Karamürsel in December 2005 and taken to Diyarbakir. A judge released him on 16 January 2006. In his testimony Toka stated that he had been imprisoned for 12.5 years.

Şırnak death well trials: on 11 September 2009 Diyarbakır Heavy Penal Court No. 6 started to hear the case of 7 defendants charged with 20 killings that had been committed between 1993 and 1995 when Colonel Cemil Temizöz had been the commander of Cizre Gendarmerie Station in Şırnak province, Cizre district. On 17 September 2010 the 18th hearing was held.

The 2005 Şemdinli incident involved Gendarmerie intelligence personnel and alleged links to JİTEM. Three men were sentenced to 39 years for murder in a grenade attack.
