= Cem Ersever =

Turkish military officer (1950–1993)

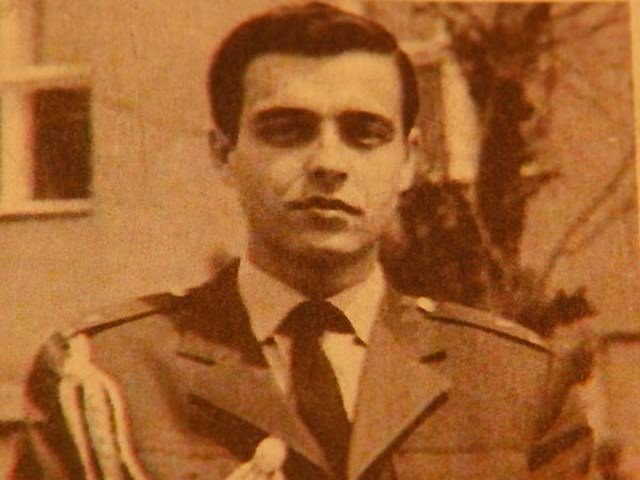

Personal details
- Born: 6 June 1950 Erzurum, Turkey
- Died: 4 November 1993 (aged 42–43) Ankara, Turkey

Military service
- Allegiance: Turkey
- Branch/service: Turkish Army
- Years of service: 1968–1993
- Rank: Major

Ahmet Cem Ersever (6 June 1950 – 4 November 1993) was a commander in the Turkish Gendarmerie, and said to be one of the founders of the Gendarmerie's JITEM intelligence unit. He was assassinated in November 1993. His girlfriend and translator Nevval Boz was also assassinated, along with İhsan Hakan, a former PKK member.

Prior to his assassination, Ersever had left the army and began speaking to the press, and said he was in charge of JITEM's south-eastern operations. In his resignation statement he said "A gang formed inside the authorized organization in the Southeast is preventing the Turkish nation from seeing the real dimensions of the events taking place there." He published a book on the war with the PKK under the pen-name Ahmet Aydın. His interviews with journalist Soner Yalçın were published in Aydınlık, after which the Military Prosecutor's Office opened an investigation, and took a deposition from Ersever. Ersever's archive went missing after his death, but was later found in the house of Veli Küçük during investigations for the Ergenekon trials. A report found in Küçük's house suggested that journalist Uğur Mumcu, General Eşref Bitlis and Ersever had all been killed to cover up arms sales from the Ergenekon organization to armed Kurdish groups.

He was declared a "martyr" by the Turkish Gendarmerie in 2011. Doğu Perinçek has claimed that Ersever was assassinated to cover up his role in the assassination of Eşref Bitlis earlier that year. A report in the 1990s by police chief Hanefi Avcı said that Ersever had been killed by Mahmut Yıldırım (codename Yeşil) on the orders of Veli Küçük.

== Books ==
- Ersever (under pen-name Ahmet Aydın) (1993), Kürtler, PKK ve A. Öcalan, KİYAP
- Ersever (under pen-name Ahmet Aydın) (1993), Üçgendeki tezgâh ("Conspiracy in the Triangle"), KİYAP
- Çetin Ağaşe (2003), Cem Ersever ve JİTEM gerçeği, Bilge Karınca
- Tutkun Akbaş (2009), Cem Ersever'in son 90 günü ve kayıp kitabı "Şam'daki kemancı", Dama Yayınları
