= Diyarbakır bombing =

The Diyarbakır bombing may refer to:

- 2008 Diyarbakır bombing
- 2015 Diyarbakır rally bombings
- 2016 Diyarbakır bombing (disambiguation), which could refer to:
  - February 2016 Diyarbakır bombing
  - March 2016 Diyarbakır bombing
  - May 2016 Diyarbakır bombing
  - November 2016 Diyarbakır bombing
- 2017 Diyarbakır bombing
