= History of Diyarbakır =

The history of Diyarbakır (Arabic: ديار بكر, romanized: Diyār Bakr, Kurdish: Amed, Zaza: Diyarbekir, Assyrian Neo-Aramaic: Amedi or Amedu, Armenian: Տիգրանակերտ, Tigranakert; Syriac: ܐܡܝܕ, romanized: Āmīd), one of the largest cities in southeastern Turkey and a metropolitan municipality of Turkey, spans millennia. Diyarbakır is situated on the banks of the Tigris River. The city was first mentioned by Assyrian texts as the capital of a Semitic kingdom. It was ruled by a succession of nearly every polity that controlled Upper Mesopotamia, including the Mitanni, Arameans, Assyrians, Urartu, Armenians, Achaemenid Persians, Medes, Seleucids, and Parthians. The Roman Republic gained control of the city in the first century BC, by which stage it was named "Amida". Amida was then part of the Christian Byzantine Empire until the seventh-century Muslim conquest, after which a variety of Muslim polities including Rashidun, Umayyads, and Abbasids, gave way to the Ottoman Empire in the 16th century. It has been part of the Republic of Turkey since the dissolution of the Ottoman Empire in the early 20th century.

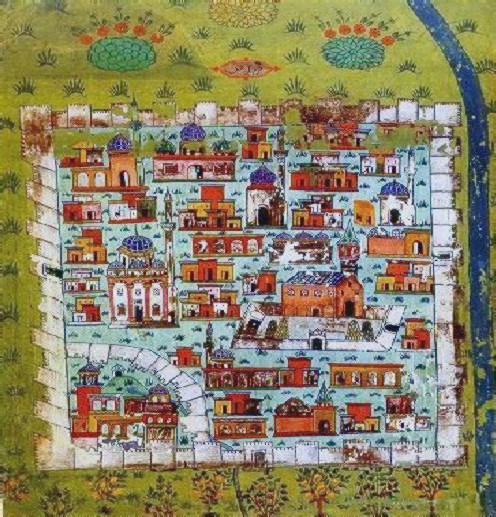
16th century plan of Diyarbakır by Matrakci Nasuh. Sur, the eastern half of the walled city depicted here, was levelled in the 2016 Siege of Sur.

== Antiquity ==
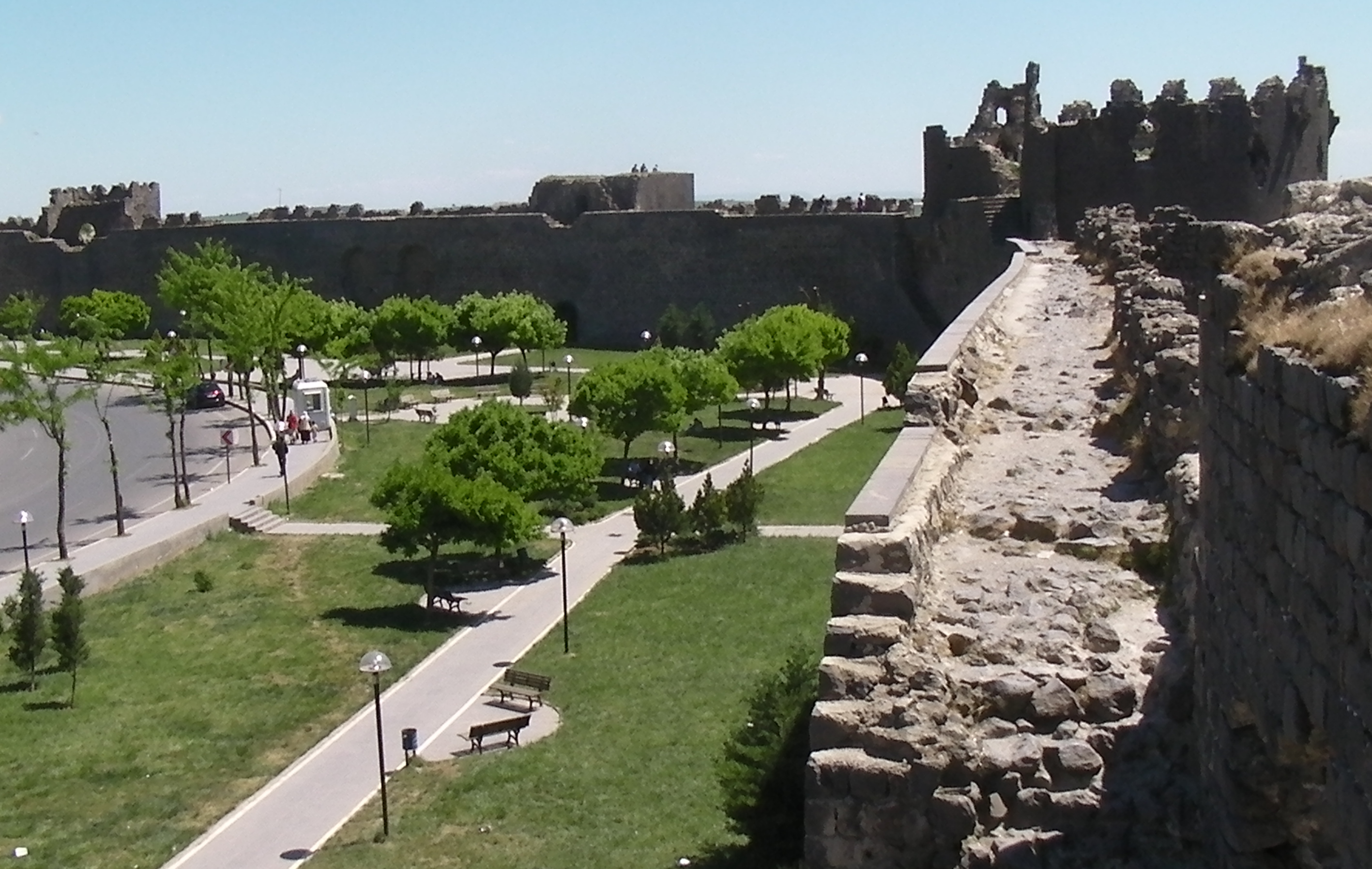
Diyarbakır's city walls, built by Constantius II and extended by Valentinian I between 367 and 375, stretch almost unbroken for about 6 kilometres.

The area around Diyarbakır has been inhabited by humans from the Stone Age with tools from that period having been discovered in the nearby Hilar cave complex. The pre-pottery neolithic B settlement of Çayönü dates to over 10,000 years ago and its excavated remains are on display at the Diyarbakır Museum. Another important site is the Girikihaciyan Tumulus in Eğil.

=== Late Bronze ===
The first major civilization to establish themselves in the region of what is now Diyarbakır were the Hurrian kingdom of the Mitanni. The city was first mentioned by Assyrian texts as the capital of a Semitic kingdom.

=== Iron Age ===
It was then ruled by a succession of nearly every polity that controlled Upper Mesopotamia, including the Arameans, Assyrians, Urartu, Armenians, Achaemenid Persians, Medes, Seleucids, and Parthians. The Roman Republic gained control of the city in 66 BC, by which stage it was named Amida, from which the modern Kurdish language name for the city, Amed, comes. In 359, Shapur II of Persia captured Amida after a siege of 73 days which is vividly described by the Roman historian Ammianus Marcellinus.

== Ecclesiastical history ==
Syriac Christianity took hold in the region between the 1st and 4th centuries AD, particularly amongst the Assyrians of the city. The earliest documented bishop of Amida was Simeon of the Assyrian Church of the East, who took part in the First Council of Nicaea in 325, on behalf of the Assyrians. In the next century, Saint Acacius of Amida (who died in 425, and is included in the Roman Martyrology) was noted for having sold the church's gold and silver vessels to ransom and assist Persian prisoners of war.

Byzantine Emperor Theodosius II (408–450) divided the Roman province of Mesopotamia into two, and made Amida the capital of Mesopotamia Prima, and thereby also the metropolitan see for all the province's bishoprics. A sixth-century Notitia Episcopatuum indicates as suffragans of Amida the sees of Martyropolis, Ingila, Belabitene, Arsamosata, Sophene, Kitharis, Cefa, and Zeugma. The Annuario Pontificio adds Bethzabda and Dadima.

The names of several of the successors of Acacius are known, but their orthodoxy is unclear. The last whose orthodoxy is certain is Cyriacus, a participant in the Second Council of Constantinople (553). Many bishops of the Byzantine Empire fled in the face of the Persian invasion of the early 7th century, with a resultant spread of the Jacobite Church. Michael the Syrian gives a list of Jacobite bishops of Amida down to the 13th century.

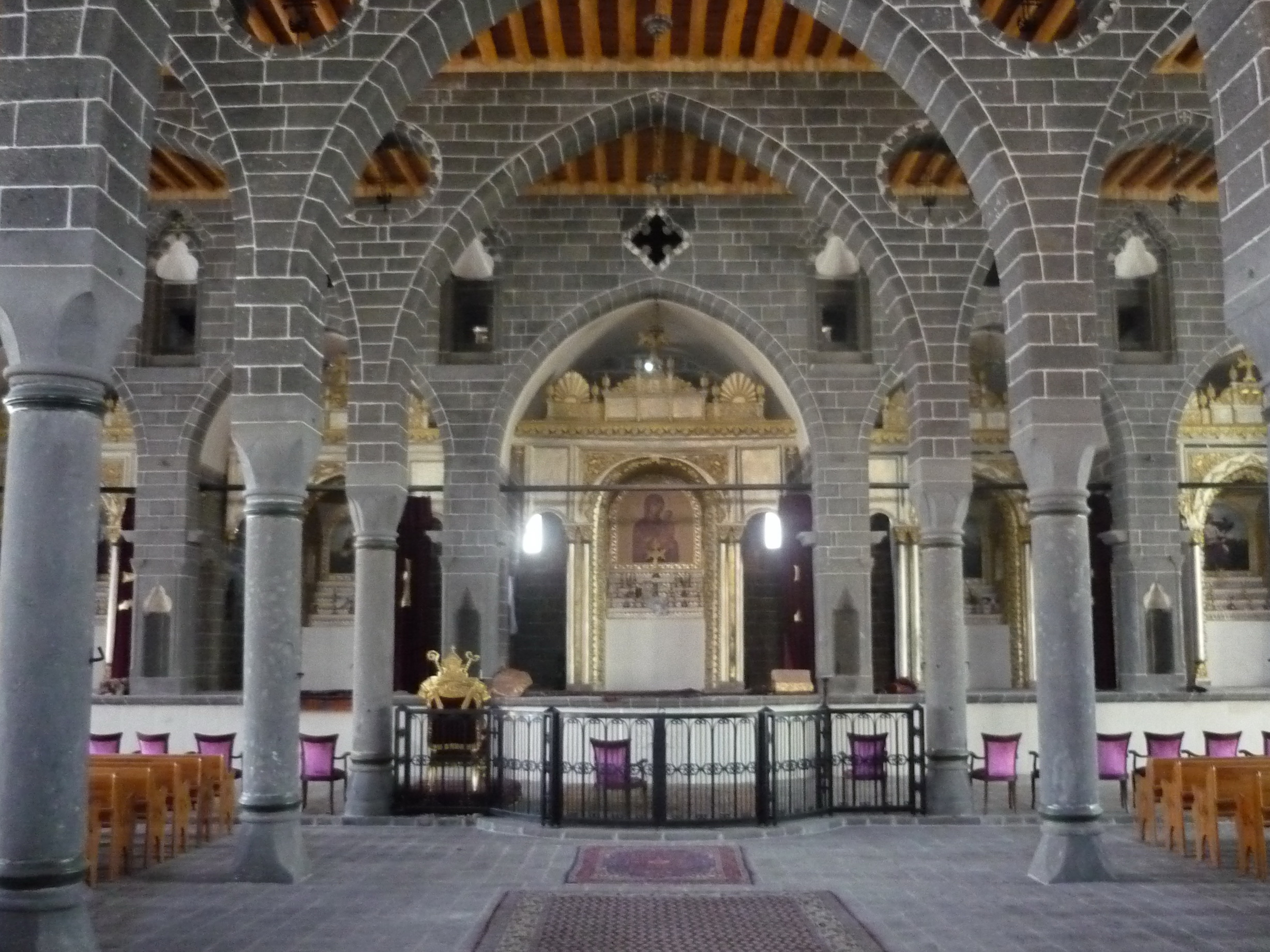
Inside the St. Giragos Armenian Church photographed after its restoration, 2012. In March 2016, the Turkish government confiscated this and several other churches in Sur after the Siege of Sur.

At some stage, Amida became a see of the Armenian Church. The bishops who held the see in 1650 and 1681 were in full communion with the Holy See, and in 1727 Peter Derboghossian sent his profession of faith to Rome. He was succeeded by two more bishops of the Armenian Catholic Church, Eugenius and Ioannes of Smyrna, the latter of whom died in Constantinople in 1785. After a long vacancy, three more bishops followed. The diocese had some 5,000 Armenian Catholics in 1903, but it lost most of its population in the 1915 Armenian genocide. The last diocesan bishop of the see, Andreas Elias Celebian, was killed with some 600 of his flock in the summer of 1915.

An eparchy for the local members of the Syriac Catholic Church was established in 1862. Ignatius Philip I Arkus, who was its first bishop, was elected patriarch in 1866, and kept the governance of the see of Amida, which he exercised through a patriarchal vicar. The eparchy was united to that of Mardin in 1888. Persecution of Christians in the Ottoman Empire during the First World War brought an end to the existence of both these Syrian residential sees.

In 1966, the Chaldean Catholic Archeparchy of Amida, with jurisdiction over all Chaldean Catholics in Turkey, was revived in Diyarbakır, with the city being both episcopal see and location of the diocesan cathedral of St. Mary Church, Diyarbakır.

As of 2015, there are two Chaldean churches and three Armenian churches in at least periodic operation. Three other churches are in ruins, all Armenian: one in Sur, Diyarbakır, one in the citadel that is now part of a museum complex, and one in another part of the city.

=== Titular sees ===
No longer a residential bishopric until 1966 (Chaldean rite), Amida is today listed by the Catholic Church as a multiple titular see, separately for the Roman Rite and two Eastern Catholic particular churches sui iuris.

==== Latin titular see ====
Amida of the Romans was suppressed in 1970, having had many archiepiscopal incumbents with a singular episcopal exception :

- Domingo Valentín Guerra Arteaga y Leiva (19 December 1725 – 8 March 1728)
- Francisco Casto Royo (15 December 1783 – September 1803)
- Gaétan Giunta (6 October 1829 – unknown date)
- Titular Bishop Augustus van Heule, Jesuits (S.J.) (9 September 1864 – 9 June 1865)
- Colin Francis McKinnon (30 August 1877 – 26 September 1879)
- Francis Xavier Norbert Blanchet (26 January 1881 – 18 June 1883)
- Beniamino Cavicchioni (21 March 1884 – 11 January 1894) (later Cardinal)
- Francesco Sogaro, Comboni Missionaies (F.S.C.I.) (18 August 1894 – 6 February 1912)
- James Duhig (27 February 1912 – 13 January 1917)
- John Baptist Pitaval (29 July 1918 – 23 May 1928)
- Carlo Chiarlo (12 October 1928 – 15 December 1958) (later Cardinal)
- Gastone Mojaisky-Perrelli (8 August 1959 – 10 May 1963)
- Robert Picard de la Vacquerie (23 May 1963 – 17 March 1969)
- Joseph Cheikho (7 March 1970 – 22 August 1970)

==== Armenian Catholic titular see ====
The diocese of Amida, in 1650, was suppressed in 1972 and immediately nominally restored as Armenian Catholic (Armenian Rite and language) titular bishopric of the lowest (episcopal) rank, Amida of the Armenians.

So far, it has had the following incumbents, of the fitting episcopal rank with an archiepiscopal exception:

- Grégoire Ghabroyan, Patriarchal Clergy Institute of Bzommar (I.C.P.B.) (3 January 1977 – 30 June 1986) as Vicar Apostolic of France of the Armenians (3 January 1977 – 30 June 1986); later Eparch (Bishop) of Sainte-Croix-de-Paris of the Armenians (France) (30 June 1986 – 2 February 2013) and Apostolic Visitor in Western Europe of the Armenians (30 June 1986 – 8 June 2013), then Patriarchal Administrator of Cilicia of the Armenians (in Beirut, Lebanon) (25 June 2015 – 25 July 2015), finally Patriarch of Cilicia as Grégoire Pierre XX Ghabroyan (24 July 2015 – present) and President of Synod of the Armenian Catholic Church (25 July 2015 – present)
- Titular Archbishop Lévon Boghos Zékiyan (21 May 2014 – 21 March 2015), as Apostolic Administrator sede plena of Istanbul of the Armenians (Turkey) (21 May 2014 – 21 March 2015), later succeeded as Archeparch (Archbishop) of Istanbul of the Armenians (21 March 2015.03.21 – present) and President of Episcopal Conference of Turkey (April 2015 – present)
- Kévork Assadourian (5 September 2015 – present), Auxiliary Bishop of Beirut of the Armenians; no previous prelature

==== Syriac Catholic titular see ====
Established in 1963 as Titular archbishopric of the highest (Metropolitan) rank, Amida of the Syriacs.

It has been vacant for decades, having had the following incumbent of Metropolitan rank;

- Titular Archbishop Flavien Zacharie Melki (6 July 1963 – 30 November 1989), as Patriarchal Vicar of Lebanon of the Syriacs (6 July 1963 – death 1983)

== Middle Ages ==
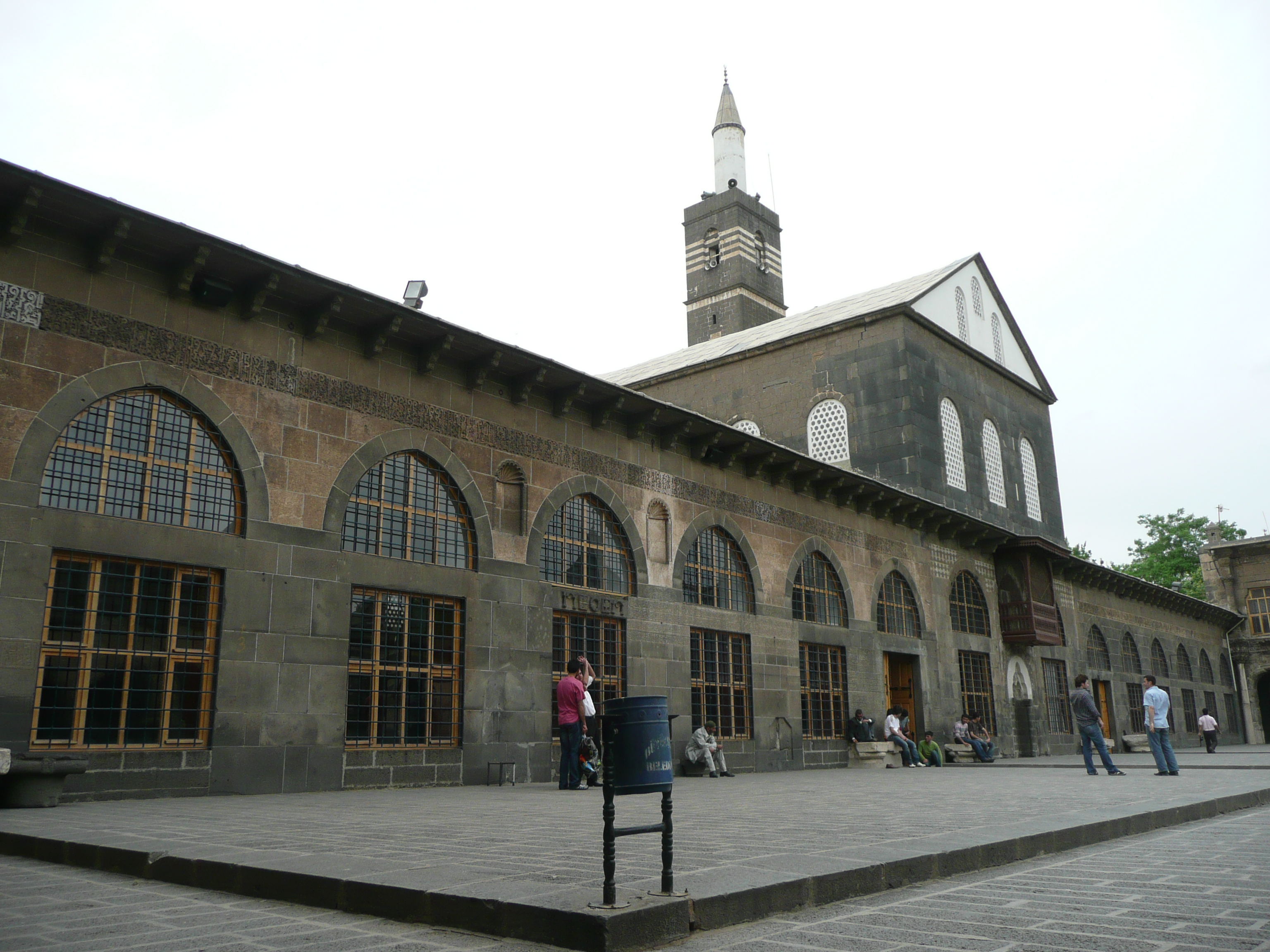
The Great Mosque of Diyarbakır, built in 1091 by Malik-Shah I

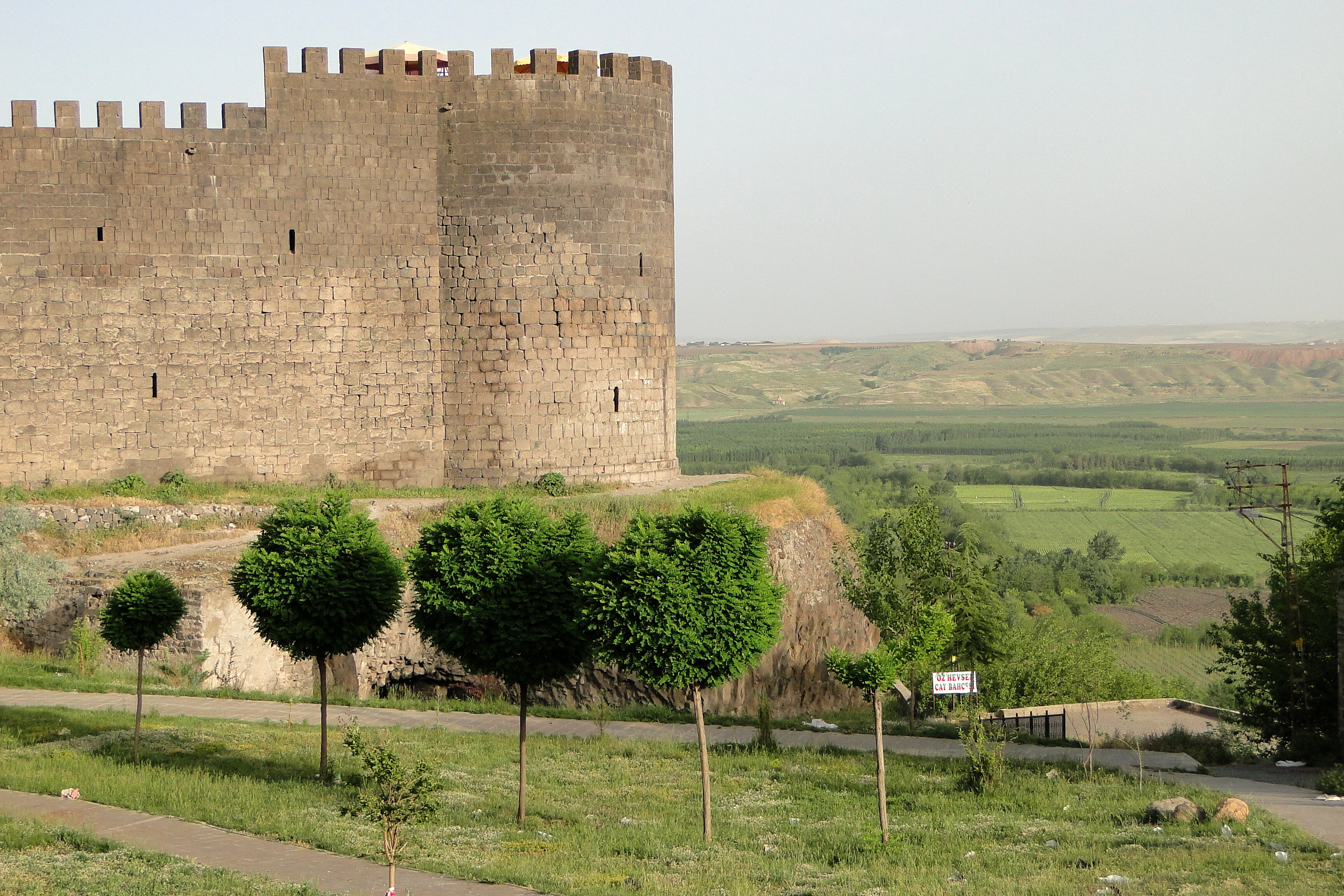
Keçi Burcu, the Goat Tower, a section of the city wall

In 639, the city was subjected to the Muslim conquests, and the religion of Islam was introduced. The city passed under Umayyad and then Abbasid control, but with the progressive fragmentation of the Abbasid Caliphate from the late 9th century, it periodically came under the rule of autonomous dynasties. Isa ibn al-Shaykh al-Shaybani and his descendants ruled the city and the wider Diyar Bakr province from 871 until 899, when Caliph al-Mu'tadid restored Abbasid control, but the area soon passed to another local dynasty, the Hamdanids. The latter were displaced by the Buyids in 978, who were in turn followed by the Marwanids in 983. The Marwanids ruled until 1085, when the Seljuks took the city from them. It came under the rule of the Mardin branch of the Oghuz Turks, and then the Anatolian beylik of the Artuqids. The city came under the Ayyubid Sultanate in 1183, which ruled the city until it was overrun by the Mongols in 1260. For a time the city was ruled by the competing Turkic federations of the Kara Koyunlu (the Black Sheep) and then the Aq Qoyunlu until the rise of the Persian Safavids, who took over the city and the wider region in the 16th century.

== Safavids and Ottomans ==
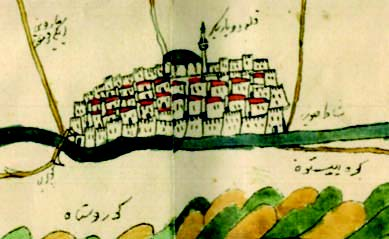
This 17th-century map detail shows Diyarbakır (west at top, from a 17th-century Ottoman map of the Tigris-Euphrates river system that may have been created by Evliya Çelebi)

The Classical Age of the Ottoman Empire saw it expand into Western Armenia and all but the eastern regions of Kurdistan at the expense of the Safavids. From the early 16th century, the city and the wider region was the source of intrigue between the Safavids and the Ottoman Empire, both of whom sought the support of the Kurdish chieftains around Idris Bitlisi. It was conquered by the Ottoman Empire in 1514 in the campaigns of Bıyıklı Mehmed Pasha, under the rule of Sultan Selim I. Mohammad Khan Ustajlu, the Safavid Governor of Diyarbakir, was evicted from the city and killed in the following Battle of Chaldiran in 1514.

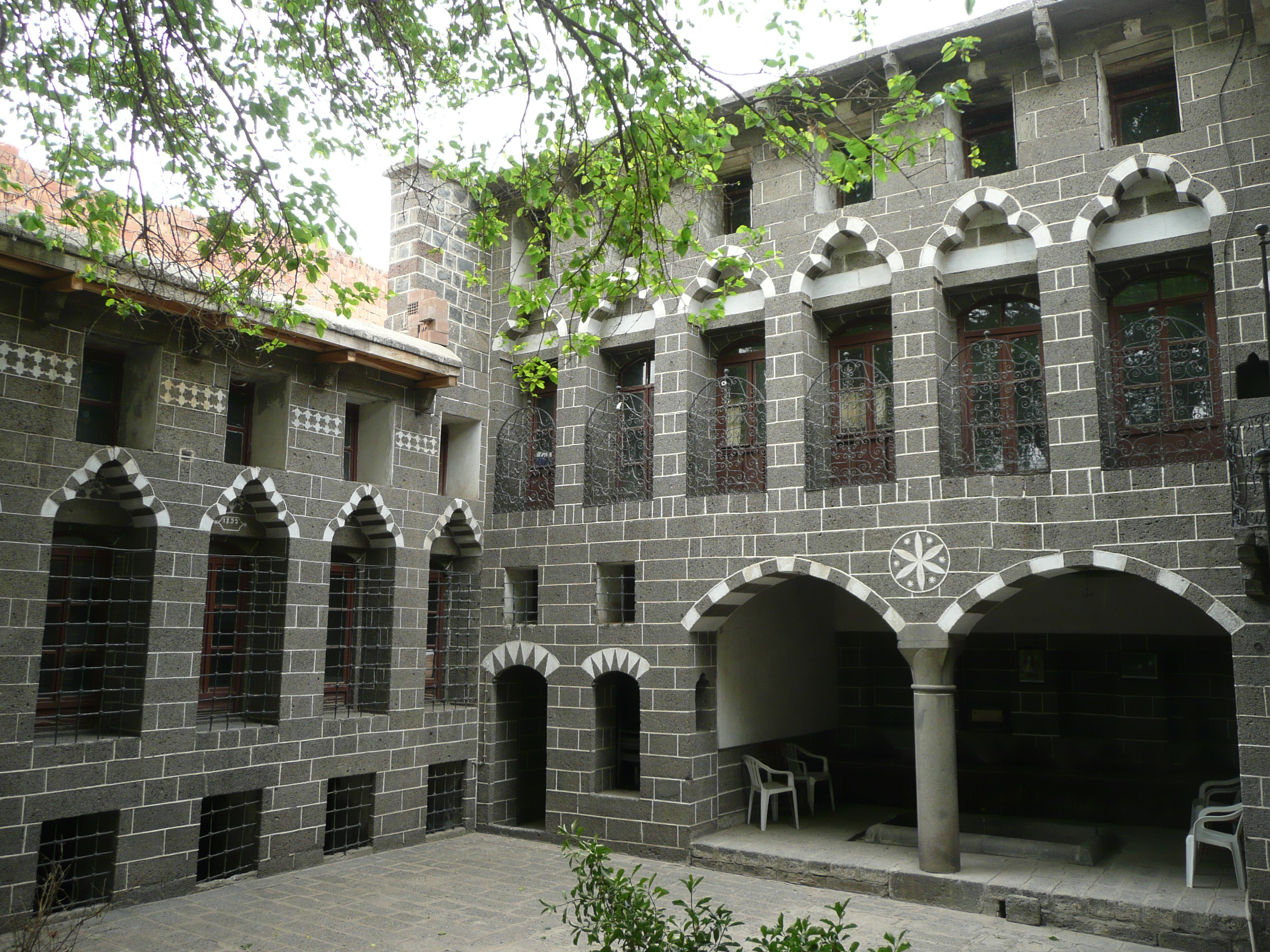
A typical example of Diyarbakır's historic architectural style, with masonry tiles built of the city's indigenous type of dark basalt stone.

Following their victory, the Ottomans established the Diyarbekir Eyalet with its administrative centre in Diyarbakır. The Eyalet of Diyarbakır corresponded to today's Turkish Kurdistan, a rectangular area between the Lake Urmia to Palu and from the southern shores of Lake Van to Cizre and the beginnings of the Syrian desert, although its borders saw some changes over time. The city was an important military base for controlling the region and at the same time a thriving city noted for its craftsmen, producing glass and metalwork. For example, the doors of Rumi's tomb in Konya were made in Diyarbakır, as were the gold and silver decorated doors of the tomb of Ebu Hanife in Baghdad. Ottoman rule was confirmed by the 1555 Peace of Amasya which followed the Ottoman–Safavid War (1532–1555). The Safavid Shah Abbas I recaptured the city for two brief periods, during the Ottoman–Safavid War (1603–18), and once again in 1623–1624, during the Ottoman–Safavid War (1623–1639).

Concerned with independent-mindedness of the Kurdish principalities, the Ottomans sought to curb their influence and bring them under the control of the central government in Constantinople. However, removal from power of these hereditary principalities led to more instability in the region from the 1840s onwards. In their place, sufi sheiks and religious orders rose to prominence and spread their influence throughout the region. One of the prominent Sufi leaders was Shaikh Ubaidalla Nahri, who began a revolt in the region between Lakes Van and Urmia. The area under his control covered both Ottoman and Qajar territories. Shaikh Ubaidalla is regarded as one of the earliest proponents of Kurdish nationalism. In a letter to a British Vice-Consul, he declared: "The Kurdish nation is a people apart... we want our affairs to be in our hands."

In 1895 an estimated 25,000 Armenians and Assyrians were massacred in Diyarbekir Vilayet, including in the city. At the turn of the 19th century, the Christian population of the city was mainly made up of Armenians and Syriac Orthodox Christians. The city was also a site of ethnic cleansing during the 1915 Armenian and Assyrian genocide; nearly 150,000 were expelled from the city to the death marches in the Syrian desert.

== Republic of Turkey ==
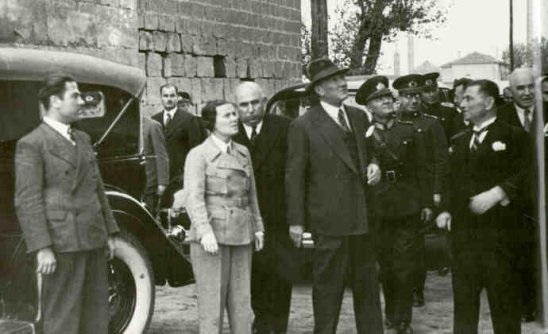
Mustafa Kemal Atatürk, Ali Çetinkaya and Sabiha Gökçen in Diyarbakır, 16 November 1937

In January 1928, Diyarbakır became the center of the First Inspectorate-General, a regional subdivision for an area containing the provinces of Hakkari, Van, Şırnak, Mardin, Siirt, Bitlis and Şanlıurfa. A Inspectorate-General had wide-ranging authorities over all civil, military and educational matters. The post of the Inspectorate-General was abandoned in 1948. But its legal framework was only abandoned in 1952 under the government of the Democrat Party. In a reorganization of the provinces in 1952, Diyarbakır city was made the administrative capital of the Diyarbakır Province. In 1993, Diyarbakir was established as a Metropolitan Municipality. Its districts are Baĝlar, Bismil, Ergani, Hazro, Kayapinar, Çermik, Çinar, Eğil, Dicle, Kulp, Kocaköy, Lice, Silvan, Sur, Yenişehir and Hani.

Diyarbakır grew from a population of 30,000 in the 1930s to 65,000 by 1956, to 140,000 by 1970, to 400,000 by 1990, and eventually swelled to about 1.5 million by 1997.

The American-Turkish Pirinçlik Air Force Base, near Diyarbakır, was operational from 1956 to 1997.

During the 1980s and 1990s, at the peak of the Kurdish-Turkish conflict, the population of the city grew dramatically as many inhabitants of the thousands of Kurdish villages depopulated by Turkey settled in the city. Diyarbakır has seen much violence in recent years, involving Turkish security forces, the Kurdistan Workers Party (PKK), and the Islamic State of Iraq and the Levant (ISIL). In March 2006 heavy fighting broke out around Diyarbakir between the PKK and Turkish security forces, as well as large riots by PKK supporters, as result the army had to temporary close the roads to Diyarbakır Airport and many schools and businesses had to be shut down. Between 8 November 2015 and 15 May 2016 large parts of Sur were destroyed in fighting between the Turkish military and the PKK.

Many bombings were perpetrated in city during the conflict targeting both military targets and civilians. On 18 February 2016, a roadside bomb placed by PKK killed 6 soldiers and injured another. On 10 May 2016, a bombing perperated by PKK in city killed 3 people while injuring 45 others, including 33 civilians. On 12 May 2016, a truck bombing in Dürümlü hamlet of city killed 16 people and injured 23 others, all civilians. On 4 November 2016 a bombing near a police building in city killed 2 policemen and 9 civilians while injuring 100 others, both Islamic State of Iraq and the Levant and the Kurdistan Freedom Hawks claimed responsibility.

A 2018 report by Arkeologlar Derneği İstanbul found that, since 2015, 72% of the city's historic Sur district had been destroyed through demolition and redevelopment, and that laws designed to protect historic monuments had been ignored. They found that the city's "urban regeneration" policy was one of demolition and redevelopment rather than one of repairing cultural assets damaged during the recent civil conflict, and because of that many registered historic buildings had been completely destroyed. The extent of the loss of non-registered historic structures is unknown because any historic building fragments revealed during the demolition of modern structures were also demolished.
