= May 2016 Dürümlü bombing =

Terrorist incident in Diyarbakır, Turkey

- Part of Kurdish–Turkish conflict
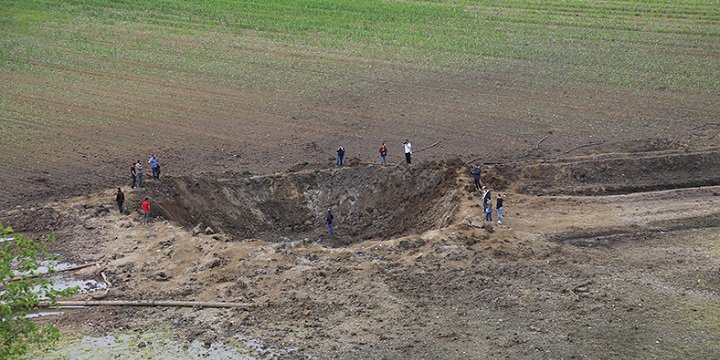
- Pit formed after explosion
- Location: Diyarbakır, Turkey
- Date: 12 May 2016; 22:30 (GMT+2)
- Attack type: Truck bomb
- Deaths: 16 (civilians)
- Injuries: 23 (civilians)

The May 2016 Dürümlü bombing (also known as Dürümlü massacre in Turkey) was a truck bombing that took place in Dürümlü hamlet in Diyarbakir's Sur district, Turkey on 12 May 2016 at approximately 22:30 local time. As a result of the attack 16 villagers were killed and 23 villagers were wounded. The People's Defence Forces (HPG), the military wing of the Kurdistan Workers' Party (PKK), accepted that the truck was driven by members of the HPG, but the HPG also claimed that the explosives should have detonated elsewhere and that the truck only detonated as villagers opened fire on the truck.

== See also ==
- February 2016 Diyarbakır bombing
- March 2016 Diyarbakır bombing
- May 2016 Diyarbakır bombing
- November 2016 Diyarbakır bombing
