= 2016 Diyarbakır bombing =

- February 2016 Diyarbakır bombing
- March 2016 Diyarbakır bombing
- May 2016 Diyarbakır bombing
- November 2016 Diyarbakır bombing
