= Sarıdallı, Bağlar =

Sarıdallı
- Neighbourhood
- Location in Turkey
- Coordinates: 37.8386°N 40.17422°E
- Country: Turkey
- Province: Diyarbakır
- District: Bağlar
- Time zone: UTC+3 (TRT)

Sarıdallı (Note: Formerly known as Deyr-Bashur, Der-Bashur, Darbashour, Derbeşür, or Delbeşür.) is a neighbourhood of the municipality and district of Bağlar, Diyarbakır Province, Turkey.

== History ==
Deyr-Bashur (today called Sarıdallı) was historically inhabited by Armenians and Syriac Orthodox Christians. It was located in the Diyarbakır central district (merkez kaza) in the Diyarbakır sanjak in the Diyarbekir vilayet in c. 1900. Amidst the Sayfo, on 3 May 1915, men from Deyr-Bashur and other neighbouring villages were rounded up at Chanaqchi by 150 militiamen led by Shakir Bey and members of the Kurdish Rama tribe led by Ömer and taken to a pit near the village of Hawar-Dejla, where they were shot. 164 men were murdered in total.

== Bibliography ==
- Abed Mshiho Neman of Qarabash (2021) [1918]. Sayfo – An Account of the Assyrian Genocide. Translated by Michael Abdalla; Łukasz Kiczko. Edinburgh University Press.
- Gaunt, David (2006). Massacres, Resistance, Protectors: Muslim-Christian Relations in Eastern Anatolia during World War I. Gorgias Press.
- Jongerden, Joost; Verheij, Jelle, eds. (2012). Social Relations in Ottoman Diyarbekir, 1870-1915. Brill.
