= Yeşildallı, Bağlar =

Yeşildallı
- Neighbourhood
- Location in Turkey
- Coordinates: 37.89479°N 40.13128°E
- Country: Turkey
- Province: Diyarbakır
- District: Bağlar
- Time zone: UTC+3 (TRT)

Yeşildallı (Kurdish: Xaşewar) (Note: Formerly known as Hawar-Khase, Havara-Hasse, Havarkhase, Huarkhaseh, Hashavar, or Hashaver.) is a neighbourhood of the municipality and district of Bağlar, Diyarbakır Province, Turkey. The neighbourhood is populated by Kurds and had a population of 375 in 2025.

== History ==
Hawar-Khase (today called Yeşildallı) was historically inhabited by Syriac Orthodox Christians. It was located in the Diyarbakır central district (merkez kaza) in the Diyarbakır sanjak in the Diyarbekir vilayet in c. 1900. In 1914, it was inhabited by 50 Syriacs, according to the list presented to the Paris Peace Conference by the Assyro-Chaldean delegation. Amidst the Sayfo, on 3 May 1915, men from Hawar-Khase and other neighbouring villages were rounded up at Chanaqchi by 150 militiamen led by Shakir Bey and members of the Kurdish Rama tribe led by Ömer and taken to a pit near the village of Hawar-Dejla, where they were shot. 164 men were murdered in total.

== Bibliography ==
- Abed Mshiho Neman of Qarabash (2021) [1918]. Sayfo – An Account of the Assyrian Genocide. Translated by Michael Abdalla; Łukasz Kiczko. Edinburgh University Press.
- Gaunt, David (2006). Massacres, Resistance, Protectors: Muslim-Christian Relations in Eastern Anatolia during World War I. Gorgias Press.
- Jongerden, Joost; Verheij, Jelle, eds. (2012). Social Relations in Ottoman Diyarbekir, 1870-1915. Brill.
- Tîgrîs, Amed; Çakar, Yıldız (2012). Amed : erdnîgarî, dîrok, çand (in Kurdish).
