= 2017 Diyarbakır bombing =

PKK bombing in Diyarbakır, Turkey

- Part of Kurdish–Turkish conflict (1978–present); Kurdish–Turkish conflict (2015–present)
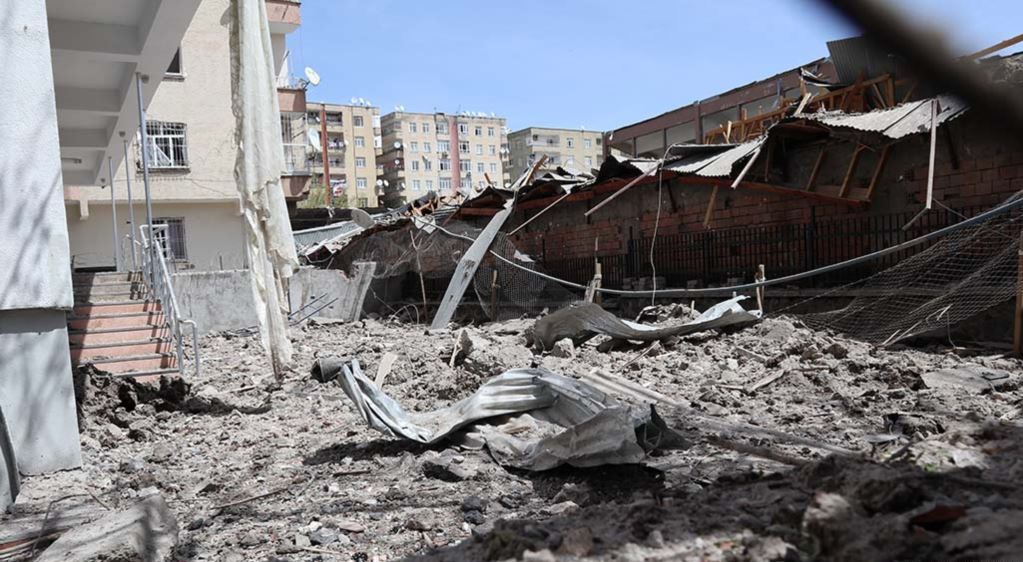
- Location: Bağlar, Diyarbakır, Turkey
- Date: 11 April 2017; 10:45 (UTC+03:00)
- Target: Police personnel, civilians
- Attack type: Bombing
- Weapon: A mixture of RDX-Ammonium nitrate-TNT explosives
- Deaths: 3
- Injuries: ~ 10–12
- Perpetrator: Kurdistan Workers' Party (PKK)

On 11 April 2017, an attack occurred in the campus of the Riot Control Police Department in the Bağlar district of Diyarbakır, Turkey. As a result of the attack, 3 people, including 1 police officer and 2 civilians, died and more than 10 people were injured. The PKK took responsibility for the attack a day later.

== Attack ==
The attack occurred on 11 April 2017 at 10:45 (UTC+03:00), within the police campus area, where different units of the Provincial Police Department were located in the central Bağlar district of Diyarbakır. As a result of the attack, 3 people, including 1 police officer and 2 civilians, were killed. Numerous buildings around the police campus were damaged in the explosion.

== Later events ==
In the first statement, it was reported that the incident occurred during the repair of the panzer in the repair workshop of the Maintenance-Repair Branch Directorate. On 12 April 2017, Minister of the Interior Süleyman Soylu announced that initially it was believed that the explosion had occurred during the repair of an armored vehicle in the workshop, as a pit was formed in the same area following the explosion, but further investigation revealed that it was a terrorist attack.

In a written statement made by the Governorship of Diyarbakır, details about the incident were given: "A 30-meter-long tunnel was dug from the basement of the apartment building adjacent to the area where the Police Department's additional units were located, towards the repair workshop affiliated to the Maintenance and Repair Department, and an explosive device, which contained RDX, TNT, ammonium nitrate and diesel, was placed there as revealed by the criminal examination. The explosion was made possible by using a time adjustable mechanism."

=== Perpetrators ===
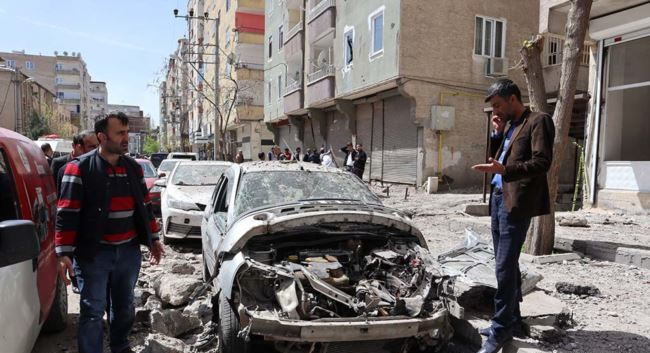
A damaged vehicle after the attack

One day after the attack, PKK took responsibility for the incident. In the PKK statement in the Firat News Agency, it was emphasized that the attack was carried out by militants affiliated with the armed wing of the PKK, HPG. It was added that the attack "was carried out by placing 2,540 pounds of explosives under the building where 150-200 riot control police officers were staying."

== Investigations and detentions ==
Following the attack, the Diyarbakır Chief Public Prosecutor's Office launched an investigation. 5 people were detained on the grounds that they had a direct connection to the incident. In addition, 172 people were detained under the instructions of the Chief Public Prosecutor within the scope of the fight against terrorism. On 16 April 2017, a PKK attacker together with two other people, who were found to enter and leave the basement rented for digging the tunnel through which the explosives were transmitted, were detained in Cizre, Şırnak, while carrying fake ID cards.

== See also ==
- November 2016 Diyarbakır bombing
