= Yalankoz =

Yalankoz can refer to:

- Yalankoz, Bağlar
- Yalankoz, Tut
- Yalankoz, Şehitkamil
