= Yiğityolu =

Yiğityolu can refer to:

- Yiğityolu, Bağlar
- Yiğityolu, Karayazı
