= Leyla İmret =

Turkish politician (born 1987)

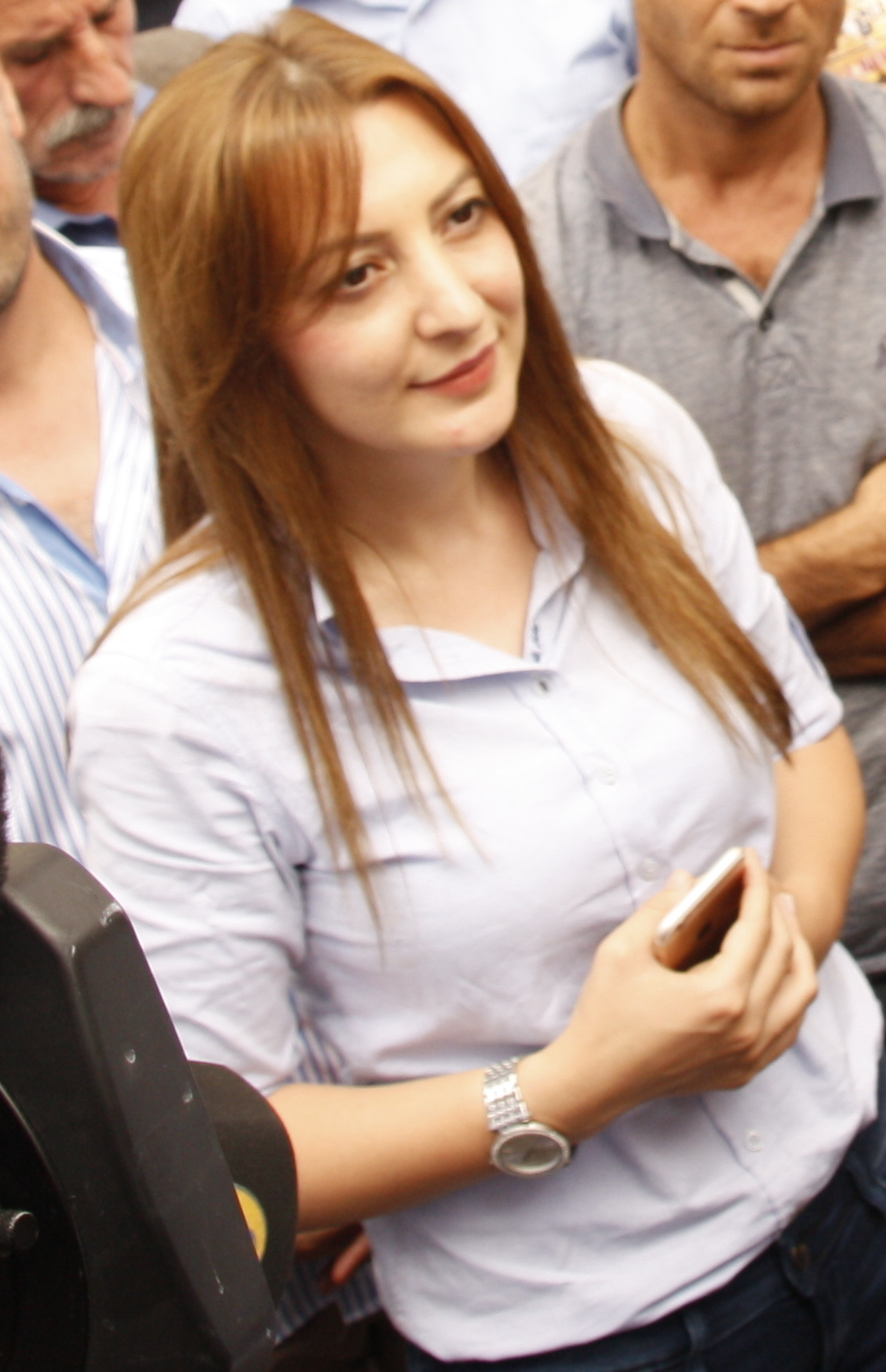
- İmret in 2015

Mayor of Cizre
- In office 31 March 2014 – 11 September 2015

Personal details
- Born: 1987 (age 37–38) Cizre, Turkey

Leyla İmret (born 1987) is a Turkish politician of Kurdish origin. She grew up in Germany but returned to her home country in 2013 and was elected mayor of Cizre on 31 March 2014. She was dismissed from her position by the government on 11 September 2015 after the siege of Cizre during the Kurdish-Turkish conflict. She eventually fled to Germany where she has continued to speak out against human rights abuses in the region. She is the subject of a 2017 documentary film, Dil Leyla and winner of the ILHR's 2018 Carl von Ossietzky Medal.

== Early life and education ==
Leyla İmret was born in June 1987 in Cizre in Turkey's southeastern province of Şırnak. Her father was killed in the conflict between security forces and the PKK when she was four and her family fled to Mersin in 1992. She moved to Bremen in Germany in 1996 and lived with relatives. She studied teaching in Germany, and worked as a nanny and a hairdresser.

== Career ==
=== Return to Turkey and election ===
İmret returned to Turkey in 2013. She said, "It is a strange feeling to come back to your hometown for the first time after 22 years, to the land where your grandfathers and father grew up, to your own soil." Although Cizre was one of Turkey's most impoverished towns after decades of conflict, the government had initiated a peace process with the Kurdish rebels and it was a time of relative calm.

İmret was elected as the Co-Mayor of Cizre for the Peace and Democracy Party (BDP) in March 2014, receiving 83% of the vote, a record for Turkish elections. Aged 27, she was the first female mayor of Cizre and the youngest mayor in Turkey. The BDP had a 40% quota for female representation and introduced a co-candidate system, where an elected leader and deputy would take equal roles and work together, which saw an increase in the numbers of women elected to district and municipal leadership. İmret was one of a number of women elected to a mayoral position across the country, and pledged to prioritise women's issues. She said, "It gives women courage to see me as mayor. More women and youth will get involved in politics." She planned to help create a normal life for the community, building parks and playgrounds and "giving children a chance to have the childhood she never had."

Although İmret's mother was skeptical and worried about her daughter's political involvement, things went well at first. But with the parliamentary elections in June 2015 resulting in a hung parliament, and the breakdown of the peace process between the AKP and the PKK, a snap election was called for November 2015. In the lead up, the Turkish government declared curfews in several regions, including Cizre. Cizre was subject to sustained airstrikes. At the time, İmret was reported as saying, "There's a saying, 'if there's peace, it will start from Cizre, and if there's war, it will start from here as well.' And we can say we have a civil war in Turkey."

In the June 2015 parliamentary elections, Cizre's mostly Kurdish residents had voted for the BDP's successor People's Democratic Party (HDP) by an 84% majority, and many saw the siege as retaliation for not voting for the Justice and Development Party (AKP). The government claimed the HDP was linked to the PKK. İmret said, "The main difference between the HDP and the PKK is that the former is a political party aiming to participate in the electoral process at the national level ... In Cizre, there is a strong support for the PKK, but the population wants the conflict to end. Nobody wants the situation of war from the 90s to start again. The HDP offers this perspective of peace." She accused the government of using repressive measures to muzzle political opponents. In August, İmret told media sources that police and soldiers had killed five people, including two children, with soldiers and police forces acting at an alarming degree that went beyond emergency rule.

=== Dismissal and detention ===
İmret was dismissed from her position as mayor by the Ministry of Interior on 12 September 2015, one of many pro-Kurdish local politicians stripped of their offices including the HDP's co-chairs Figen Yüksekdağ and Selahattin Demirtaş and 80 mayors. This attracted criticism from the region and Western countries. She was replaced by a government appointed administration through a state of emergency decree. She was charged with "inciting the public to an armed uprising against the state" after calling the blanket operation against Cizre a "civil war".

İmret was detained in November 2015, and feared killed in a siege in December after she left a message on social media saying tanks had surrounded the town, her home was being shelled and she was ready for death. In January 2016, she was arrested and accused of terrorist propaganda in connection with an interview she gave to US based Vice News. İmret says her meaning was "completely distorted" and others said the quote was "mistranslated."

İmret was later released but banned from leaving the country, however she fled Turkey by going to the Kurdistan Regional Government in Iraq and then to Germany, where she applied for and received political asylum in 2017. A warrant remains for her arrest as a supporter of the PKK.

İmret is the subject of the 2017 German documentary Dil Leyla by Asli Ozarslan, filmed while she was in hiding in Turkey. The film was screened at "Movies that Matter", Amnesty International's film festival in The Hague in April 2017, but İmret was unable to attend as she was in hiding in Turkey.

=== Life in Germany ===
İmret is one of two co-chairs of HDP Germany. She visits Kurds in exile and has testified before the European Human Rights Court about the attacks in Cizre.

In 2018, İmret testified as an expert witness at the Permanent Peoples' Tribunal in Paris on human rights violations and war crimes in Cizre. She is part of a group carrying out a hunger strike to protest Turkey's cross-border operation in Syria's Afrin District. On 28 March 2018, she spoke at a session titled "Mayors under Pressure" of the Council of Europe in Strasbourg. Her speech was welcomed by European mayors including Suresnes' Jean-Louis Testud, but Turkish representatives present were outraged, with İzmit mayor Nevzat Doğan saying "Her speaking here is a clear violation of Council of Europe Standards."

In 2018, the International League for Human Rights (Berlin) awarded the Carl von Ossietzky Medal to İmret for her "courageous struggle for Kurdish rights". The ILHR said "In exile, she continues to fight fearfully for her return to the mayor's office, where she has been democratically elected, and courageously continues to promote human rights in Turkey, as well as a peaceful and righteous solution to the Kurdish question." She shared the award with German social worker and human rights activist Ottmar Miles Paul. İmret said she dedicated the award to "those who lost their lives in the struggle for free Kurdistan, especially those who lost their lives during the resistance in Cizre" and to Democratic Society Party co-chair Leyla Güven, who was in prison in Diyarbakır.
