= Şırnak clashes (2015–2016) =

Clashes during the Turkish-Kurdish conflict

2015–2016 Şırnak clashes
- Part of the third phase of the Turkey–PKK conflict
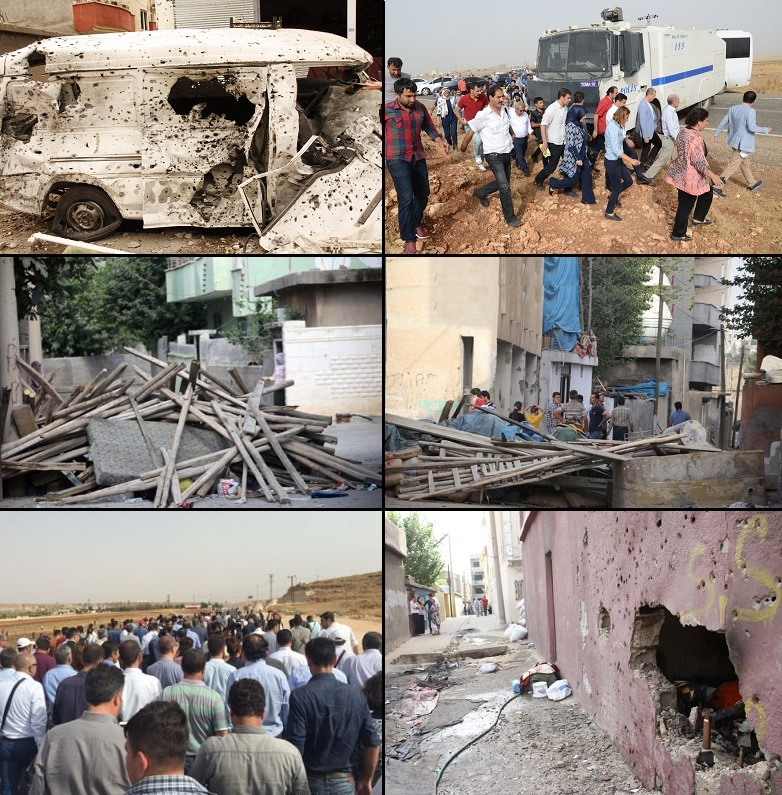
- Date: August 2015 – May 2016
- Location: Şırnak, Turkey
- Caused by: Self-government request to establish autonomous government in Şırnak
- Methods: Armed conflict Urban guerrilla warfare
- Result: Turkish Government victory PKK fail to establish autonomous region

Parties
Turkey: PÖH; Land Forces; Special Forces; SAS; Village guards; Air Force	Kurdistan Communities Union: PKK; HPG; YDG-H (until December 2015); YPS (from December 2015)

Lead figures
(Turkey) Turan Bedirhanoğlu	Duran Kalkan; Mustafa Karasu

Number
20,000 personnel ~200 maroon berets	Unknown

Casualties and losses
117 killed in total	1,464 killed in total
- 92 civilians killed in Cizre (according to human rights groups)

The 2015–2016 Şırnak clashes were a series of armed clashes in the southeastern Şırnak province, between Turkish government forces and Kurdish armed groups, as part of the Turkish–Kurdish conflict.

== Background ==
Following the 2015 Suruç bombing, the ceasefire between the Turkish government and the Kurdistan Workers' Party (PKK) ended after the PKK executed two police officers in their sleep on 22 July. In retaliation, the Turkish Air Force began striking PKK camps in northern Iraq, beginning a new phase of the Turkey–PKK conflict. The re-escalation of the conflict between the PKK and the Turkish government caused a rise of discontent in the Kurdish-majority southeast.

== Military action ==
=== 2015 ===
The first armed incident in Şırnak Province took place on 28 July when the Turkish Air Force bombed PKK fighters in the countryside. The clashes in Şırnak began to escalate following a bomb explosion that damaged a section of the Kirkuk–Ceyhan pipeline within Şırnak Province on July 29 and an ambush by the PKK on July 30 which killed 3 Turkish soldiers. On 4 August, PKK forces attacked a guard post in Şırnak Province with an RPG, killing one soldier and injuring another. In a separate incident in the province, a mine killed two soldiers. Turkish F-16s targeting PKK camps in Hakkari Province in an act of retaliation. A PKK bomb explosion killed one civilian in Cizre on 5 August.

On 7 August, Turkish Police clashed with PKK and YDG-H forces in Silopi, Cizre and Uludere and PKK-affiliated militants hijacked a minibus in Beytüşşebap. 4 police officers and 1 army conscript were killed by separate PKK-affiliated attacks in Şırnak Province on 10 August. Turkish forces killed 2 PKK militants following clashes in Beytüşşebap on 13 August. Between 4–12 September, Turkey placed the first curfew on Cizre during which it launched a military operation against the militia YDG-H. 30 people were killed during the clashes, HDP leader Selahattin Demirtaş claiming 20 of which were civilians although the Turkish government challenged this claim. Heavy clashes in Şırnak Province took place between 25–26 September, with the PKK claiming to have killed 75 soldiers and losing 14 militants while Turkish forces claimed to have killed 36 militants and lost 2 soldiers.

On 21 November, Turkish Air Force targeted PKK positions in Şırnak Province. On the 14 December the Turkish government declared a twenty-four hour curfew for the cities Silopi and Cizre. which were followed by large scale military operations by the Turkish forces launched on the 15 December against the YDG-H militias who set up barricades in the towns. By 17 December, Turkish forces had claimed to have killed between 55–70 alleged PKK militants in the two towns. The HDP leader Selahattin Demirtaş called on locals to resist the operations, denounced the government use of force, and called both the local people and government to find constructive actions. On 31 December, 1 soldier was killed and 5 others injured following a PKK rocket attack.

=== 2016 ===
On 19 January 2016 the twenty-four hour curfew in place since 14 December 2015 was reduced to a curfew only imposed in the hours between 6 pm and 5am.

== See also ==
- August 1992 Şırnak Clashes
- September 2012 Beytüşşebap attack
