= Körtepe, Bağlar =

Village in Turkey

Körtepe
- Neighbourhood
- Location in Turkey
- Coordinates: 37°52′8″N 40°5′33″E
- Country: Turkey
- Province: Diyarbakır
- District: Bağlar
- Population (2022): 1,513
- Time zone: UTC+3 (TRT)

Körtepe (Kurdish: Kortepe) is a neighbourhood in the municipality and district of Bağlar, Diyarbakır Province in Turkey. It is populated by Kurds of the Dodikan tribe and had a population of 1,513 in 2022.
