= Ağaçgeçit, Bağlar =

Ağaçgeçit
- Neighbourhood
- Location in Turkey
- Coordinates: 37.87449°N 40.17541°E
- Country: Turkey
- Province: Diyarbakır
- District: Bağlar
- Population (2025): 427
- Time zone: UTC+3 (TRT)

Ağaçgeçit (Note: Formerly known as Qarte, Qarteh, Kırte, Kirte, or Kerti.) (Kurdish: Qirtê) is a neighbourhood of the municipality and district of Bağlar, Diyarbakır Province, Turkey. It is populated by Kurds and had a population of 427 in 2025.

== History ==
Qarte (today called Ağaçgeçit) was historically inhabited by Syriac Orthodox Christians. It was located in the Diyarbakır central district (merkez kaza) in the Diyarbakır sanjak in the Diyarbekir vilayet in c. 1900. In 1914, it was inhabited by 150 Syriacs, according to the list presented to the Paris Peace Conference by the Assyro-Chaldean delegation. Amidst the Sayfo, on 3 May 1915, Qarte and other neighbouring villages were surrounded by 150 men led by Shakir Bey with an Al-Khamsin death squad and members of the Rama tribe who seized the villages' men, rounded them up at Chanaqchi, and took them to a pit near the village of Hawar-Dejla, where they were shot. In total, 164 men were killed.

== Bibliography ==
- Gaunt, David (2006). Massacres, Resistance, Protectors: Muslim-Christian Relations in Eastern Anatolia during World War I. Gorgias Press.
- Jongerden, Joost; Verheij, Jelle, eds. (2012). Social Relations in Ottoman Diyarbekir, 1870-1915. Brill.
- Tîgrîs, Amed; Çakar, Yıldız (2012). Amed : erdnîgarî, dîrok, çand (in Kurdish).
