= Gömmetaş, Bağlar =

Gömmetaş
- Neighbourhood
- Location in Turkey
- Coordinates: 37.89301°N 40.04644°E
- Country: Turkey
- Province: Diyarbakır
- District: Bağlar
- Time zone: UTC+3 (TRT)

Gömmetaş (Note: Formerly known as Sirmi, Sirimi, Sirumi, or Sırımkesen.) is a neighbourhood of the municipality and district of Bağlar, Diyarbakır Province, Turkey.

== History ==
Sirmi (today called Gömmetaş) was historically inhabited by Armenians and Syriac Orthodox Christians. It was located in the Diyarbakır central district (merkez kaza) in the Diyarbakır sanjak in the Diyarbekir vilayet in c. 1900. In 1914, it was inhabited by 300 Syriacs, according to the list presented to the Paris Peace Conference by the Assyro-Chaldean delegation. Amidst the Sayfo, on 3 May 1915, all of the men from the village were killed by men led by Shakir Bey and Ömer of the Rama tribe. Some of the women and children were captured by the Kurds whilst others managed to get to safety at Diyarbakır.

== Bibliography ==
- Gaunt, David (2006). Massacres, Resistance, Protectors: Muslim-Christian Relations in Eastern Anatolia during World War I. Gorgias Press.
- Jongerden, Joost; Verheij, Jelle, eds. (2012). Social Relations in Ottoman Diyarbekir, 1870-1915. Brill.
