= Siege of Sur (2016) =

Siege in Diyarbakır Province, Turkey

- Part of Kurdish–Turkish conflict (2015–present)
Date	3 December 2015 – 10 March 2016 (3 months and 1 week)
Location	Sur, Diyarbakir, Turkey
Result	Turkish victory

Belligerents
Turkey: Jandarma; Turkish Police Force; Village guards; Turkish Army 1st Commando Brigade	Kurdistan Workers' Party (PKK): YDG-H

Casualties and losses
(Turkey) 71 security personnel killed 523 wounded	271 militants killed, unknown captured (Turkish claim)
- At least 25 civilians deaths (estimate)

The 2016 siege of Sur, also known as the Sur curfew took place as part of the Kurdish–Turkish conflict in Sur district of Diyarbakir in Turkey, lasting for more than 3 months and destroying much of the neighbourhood. Heavy artillery and machine gun fire was utilized during clashes in the city involving the Turkish army and police against the Kurdish militants. At least 25 people had been killed in Sur by early March 2016, with rights groups reporting more than 200 killed by the end of the siege on 10 March. The HDP party said that most of the casualties were civilians.

== Background ==
In August 2015, local Kurdish politicians announced autonomous self-rule in Sur, one of several attempts at Kurdish autonomy in the region at the time. Turkish police used plastic bullets, tear gas and water cannons against thousands of demonstrators protesting the curfew in Diyarbakır. Daily curfews were imposed on several towns in the region as a result. The curfew in Sur began on 11 December 2015.

== Siege ==
In late February and early March 2016, Turkish police again used plastic bullets, tear gas and water cannons against thousands of demonstrators protesting the curfew in Diyarbakır. Human rights groups, NGOs, local trade organisations and EU parliamentarians had asked the Turkish authorities to allow for a 24-hour suspension of the curfew and the establishment of a humanitarian corridor, so that civilians still trapped inside embattled parts of Sur can safely be evacuated. Diyarbakır's governor agreed to suspend fire for one and a half hours on consecutive days in the city, during which the police used loudspeakers to demand everyone still living amid the ruined buildings to surrender, but many feared the consequences of surrendering.

== Outcome ==
A report by Turkey's main opposition, the Republican People's Party, revealed that by late February 2016 about 80% of all buildings inside the Sur curfew zone had been destroyed, and that most people had left even the intact parts of the neighbourhood for fear of the violence. At least 25 people were killed in the siege of Sur, with rights groups claiming the death toll at more than 200. The Peoples' Democratic Party claimed that most of the casualties in Sur were civilians.

== See also ==
- December 2015–February 2016 Cizre curfew
- Cizre operation (2015)
- Siege of Silvan (2015)
- 2015 Diyarbakır rally bombing
- Roboski massacre
