= Karacadağ, Bağlar =

Village in Turkey

Karacadağ
- Neighbourhood
- Location in Turkey
- Coordinates: 37°47′45″N 39°54′35″E
- Country: Turkey
- Province: Diyarbakır
- District: Bağlar
- Population (2022): 5,097
- Time zone: UTC+3 (TRT)

Karacadağ is a neighbourhood in the municipality and district of Bağlar, Diyarbakır Province in Turkey. Its population is 5,097 (2022).
