= Ekince, Bağlar =

Village in Turkey

Ekince
- Neighbourhood
- Location in Turkey
- Coordinates: 37°50′09″N 39°54′04″E
- Country: Turkey
- Province: Diyarbakır
- District: Bağlar
- Population (2022): 699
- Time zone: UTC+3 (TRT)

Ekince is a neighbourhood in the municipality and district of Bağlar, Diyarbakır Province in Turkey. Its population is 699 (2022).
