= Yukarıakdibek, Bağlar =

Village in Turkey

Yukarıakdibek
- Neighbourhood
- Location in Turkey
- Coordinates: 37°52′29″N 39°52′36″E
- Country: Turkey
- Province: Diyarbakır
- District: Bağlar
- Population (2022): 64
- Time zone: UTC+3 (TRT)

Yukarıakdibek is a neighbourhood in the municipality and district of Bağlar, Diyarbakır Province in Turkey. Its population is 64 (2022).
