= Buyuransu, Bağlar =

Village in Turkey

Buyuransu
- Neighbourhood
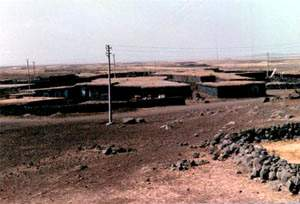

- Location within Turkey
- Coordinates: 37°47′39″N 40°05′32″E
- Country: Turkey
- Province: Diyarbakır
- District: Bağlar
- Population (2022): 691
- Time zone: UTC+3 (TRT)

Buyuransu (Kurdish: Bekaşên) is a neighbourhood in the municipality and district of Bağlar, Diyarbakır Province in Turkey. It is populated by Kurds of the Hasenan tribe and had a population of 691 in 2022.
