= December 2015–February 2016 Cizre curfew =

Turkish military curfew

Siege of Cizre
- Part of Kurdish–Turkish conflict
Date	14 December 2015 – 11 February 2016
Location	Cizre, Şırnak, Turkey
Result	Turkish victory: Parts of Cizre destroyed, hundreds of civilians killed

Belligerents
Turkey	Kurdistan Workers' Party (PKK)

Units involved
Turkish Armed Forces: Jandarma; Special Forces Command	YDG-H

Casualties and losses
Unknown	160 civilians killed 2 civilians killed

The December 2015–February 2016 Cizre curfew was the second Turkish military curfew in Cizre since the onset of the Kurdish-Turkish conflict after the end of the cease fire between the Kurdistan Workers' Party and the Turkish state in 2015. The curfew took place within the scope of the 2015–16 Şırnak clashes and after the September 2015 Cizre curfew, during a period of violent curfews throughout Southeastern Turkiye The Cizre curfew involved "wholesale destruction of large residential areas carried out by the military", which used crew-served weapons, including airstrikes. More than 150 civilian were burned alive while sheltering in basements.

== The curfew ==
On the 14 December 2015, the Turkish Government announced a twenty-four hour curfew for the city of Cizre. As in other places, the Turkish military used heavy weapons to bomb residential areas. According to BBC, the total death toll was "up to 160".

Around 20 January Turkish military opened fire without warning on a group of unarmed Kurdish civilians waving white flags, thereby killing two and wounding nine people. The video journalist Refik Tekin filming the incident was shot in the leg and later accused of being a member of a terrorist organisation. Turkish state media reported: "Three terrorists were neutralised and nine others wounded". The UN High Commissioner for Human Rights expressed concerns and urged an investigation.

During the military operations in the weeks before the massacre on 7 February there were reports about people trapped in basements, some of them wounded, and that the government denied emergency ambulance access. Cumhuriyet published a recording of a telephone conversation with the citizens in one of the basements.

== Cizre basement massacre ==
Cizre basement massacre
- Location: Cizre, Şırnak, Turkey
- Date: 7 February 2016
- Target: Kurdish civilians
- Attack type: Massacre, arson
- Deaths: more than 150 killed (per RT); 178 killed (per IPPNW, İHD, ANF)
- Perpetrator: Turkish security forces

The violence peaked on 7 February 2016, when more than 150 civilians were killed by Turkish security forces, reportedly many burnt alive. The same sources claim that the evidence shows these were intentional massacres and deliberate executions that "cannot be explained only as a result of the fighting." Some of the claimed dead were allegedly children as young as nine to 10 years old. Some of the totally burned corpses could not be identified.

In another recording it is reported that Turkish security forces burned about 20 people alive after pouring gasoline into a basement, and that they were playing music used by the ultra-nationalist organisation called Grey Wolves.

As reported by IPPNW, according to the Human Rights Association 178 unarmed people were killed by the Turkish military and their bodies found in three basements. The same is reported by Kurdish sources. Turkey called these accusations "baseless terror propaganda" used as "recruitment tools" for the Kurdistan Workers' Party, the UN in turn claimed that Turkey refused to allow a UN team to conduct research in the area, reporting to have reports that more than 100 people were burned to death while sheltering in basements in Cizre. Domestically there was no crime scene investigation and no judicial authority was allowed to enter the basements. Instead the Turkish authorities arranged for the ruins to be flattened, the basements filled with rubble, and the bodies taken away. Human Rights Watch suspects a cover-up.

== In the media ==
Turkey: There is no balanced coverage by Turkish media because of censorship in Turkey and Media blackouts. In particular with regard to the Kurdish–Turkish conflict, critical journalists in Turkey risk prosecution and imprisonment for 'terrorist propaganda'. This is barring a large part of the country from knowing what is going on in the Kurdish region. Articles of the Zaman newspaper on the Cizre basement massacre have become inaccessible after the March 2016 government takeover.

Germany: Telepolis reported about this topic in several articles containing links to further information, there were also some reports on Deutsche Welle (see references).

United Kingdom: The Guardian started to report in April 2016 about some incidents during the curfew. End of May there was a BBC News report on the Cizre basement massacre.

== Reactions ==
Russia: In March 2016 the Russian Foreign Ministry addressed the United Nations High Commissioner for Human Rights’ office, asking for it to investigate.

United Nations: On 10 May 2016 the UN high commissioner for human rights has voiced alarm about violence against civilians by Turkish government forces in Kurdish-majority south-eastern Turkey, in particular in Cizre, and expressed concern over the Turkish government’s refusal to allow a UN team to conduct research in the area.

== See also ==
- Siege of Sur (2016)
- Cizre operation (2015)
- 2015-16 Şırnak clashes
- Roboski airstrike
- Başbağlar massacre
- Pınarcık massacre
- Blue Market massacre
- 26 July 1994 bombing of North Iraq
