= Kamışpınar, Bağlar =

Village in Turkey

Kamışpınar
- Neighbourhood
- Location in Turkey
- Coordinates: 37°51′22″N 39°49′49″E
- Country: Turkey
- Province: Diyarbakır
- District: Bağlar
- Population (2022): 323
- Time zone: UTC+3 (TRT)

Kamışpınar is a neighbourhood in the municipality and district of Bağlar, Diyarbakır Province in Turkey. Its population is 323 (2022).
