= Kırkkoyun, Bağlar =

Village in Turkey

Kırkkoyun
- Neighbourhood
- Location in Turkey
- Coordinates: 37°48′N 39°56′E
- Country: Turkey
- Province: Diyarbakır
- District: Bağlar
- Population (2022): 2,469
- Time zone: UTC+3 (TRT)

Kırkkoyun is a neighbourhood in the municipality and district of Bağlar, Diyarbakır Province in Turkey. Its population is 2,469 (2022).
