= Karahanköy, Bağlar =

Village in Turkey

Karahanköy
- Neighbourhood
- Location in Turkey
- Coordinates: 37°50′24″N 39°58′59″E
- Country: Turkey
- Province: Diyarbakır
- District: Bağlar
- Population (2022): 1,299
- Time zone: UTC+3 (TRT)

Karahanköy is a neighbourhood in the municipality and district of Bağlar, Diyarbakır Province in Turkey. It is populated by Kurds of the Mendan tribe and had a population of 1,299 in 2022.
