= Electoral fraud and violence during the June 2015 Turkish general election =

In the run-up to, during and after the Turkish general election of June 2015, numerous accusations of electoral fraud and violence were made by opposition parties. Electoral fraud in Turkey has usually been most extensive during local elections, where individual votes have significantly larger impact in determining local administrations. Although the 2014 presidential election saw little evidence of electoral misconduct, issues regarding voter records as well as extensive media bias have been controversial issues that have remained largely unaddressed. In both the local and presidential elections in 2014, several voters reported that ballot papers had been sent to addresses that are wrong or do not exist as well as voters that have been dead for a substantial amount of time.

In March 2015, an unnamed AKP source close to one of the party's deputy leaders Süleyman Soylu revealed that his party had staged electoral fraud during the 2014 local elections and claimed that several AKP employees were uncomfortable with their tactics. The source claimed that the party had a 5-point plan for every election.

- The use of bogus opinion polls
- The intentional miscalculation of votes during counting, resulting in incorrect results being recorded and sent to the electoral council
- The bribery or threatening of returning officers to stop the miscounting being reported to the authorities
- The misleading announcement of the AKP's scale of victory early on in the election night to demotivate opposition counting observers and incentivising them to abandon the ballot boxes
- The use of fake addresses and dead people as voters

The source also confirmed that the sharp rise in electricity cuts during election nights were deliberate and were intended to disrupt the counting process.

Several candidates and party offices were all subject to politically motivated attacks, culminating in the death of 4 supporters of the pro-Kurdish and pro-minority Peoples' Democratic Party after two bombs exploded during a rally in Diyarbakır on 5 June. The interference of President Erdoğan, who was accused of covertly campaigning for the AKP under the guise of 'public opening' rallies, was also controversial since the President is constitutionally required to exercise political neutrality.

== Electoral fraud and misconduct ==
=== Pre-election campaigning restrictions and violations ===
On 3 March, the governor of İzmir took a series of decisions curbing the ability of citizens to protest against the 'established order', limiting freedom of expression and limiting all forms of political propaganda and demonstrations to written statements only. The İzmir Bars Association stated that they would appeal against the decisions, accusing them of being undemocratic and counterproductive. The decisions were later reversed by the governor's office amid heavy protests on social media.

In May, a CHP election stand in Erzurum was blocked by large police lorries with officers demanding that party flags be removed from the area. Erzurum's front-running CHP candidate protested the decision and asked why large lorries accompanied the officers who were simply demanding party activists to take down flags. The lorries parked in front of the election stand, obstructing its view to the members of the public. In Rize, the AKP run Rize municipality sealed off a wedding salon that had been rented out by the MHP for their campaign, eventually leading to party activists breaking into the building. Although the municipality claimed that the salon lacked the required legal documents, the fact that it had only been sealed after the MHP rented it out led to party activists describing the situation as a 'black mark' in the history of democracy. The MHP also filed a criminal complaint against the AKP-run Istanbul Metropolitan Municipality, accusing it of tearing down their banners and flags.

The AKP have also attempted to increase participation and ratings for their electoral rallies and televised interviews with key government politicians through cold calling. Cold calling and messaging for political reasons was officially made illegal on 1 May 2015 after the Law no. 6563 took effect on that day. On 25 May, a message sent out to millions of people around Turkey by the Ankara Metropolitan Municipality advertised a TV programme where the Mayor Melih Gökçek was due to make 'important statements'. The message resulted in the complaints hotline crashing due to a sudden surge in complaints being made about the advertisement.

=== Overprinting of ballot papers ===
In preparation for the election, the Supreme Electoral Council ordered the printing of 73,988,955 ballot papers despite a domestic electorate of about 53 million. 897,000 of these ballot papers were to be sent to 33 customs gates for voters voting at the border or airports, while 2,917,200 were printed for Turkish expats voting abroad. The significantly large number of ballot papers printed despite the total electorate renewed controversy that had been caused during the 2014 local and presidential elections, where opposition candidates voiced concerns about how spare ballot papers would be utilised.

=== Use of state funds ===
The use of state funds for financing their campaigns is an issue that the AKP has continuously been accused of in the preceding local and presidential elections. In preparation for the general election, AKP founder and former leader Recep Tayyip Erdoğan held rallies in numerous provinces and criticised the opposition. Despite being constitutionally neutral as the President of Turkey, Erdoğan has been accused of implicitly supporting the AKP's election campaign. During a rally in Batman, Erdoğan replied to questions about how his rallies were financed, saying "I'm holding rallies with state money. This is my natural right." The admission that Erdoğan was using state finances to fund AKP-leaning rallies was proven to be heavily controversial, with the HDP complaining to the Supreme Electoral Commission, though their complaint was rejected soon after.

On 9 May, an AKP campaign van was spotted with a black license plate, with a black license plate in Turkey meaning that the vehicle is an official vehicle of the state. The use of official state vehicles for campaigning is forbidden under Turkish law. On the same day, an AKP campaign poster was spotted in an Istanbul bus garage being accompanied by the logo of the Istanbul Metropolitan Municipality, which was again accused of being a violation of electoral law. On 17 May, it emerged that a sudden shortage of İETT public busses in Istanbul was a result of many being taken out of service to provide a shuttle between different towns and the AKP's electoral rally in the Maltepe district.

On 11 May, the Governor of Denizli Province, Şükrü Kocatepe, was caught demanding minibuses and other vehicles from various institutions in Denizli in preparation for the AKP's electoral rally. While governors are appointed by the government, they legally must remain politically neutral. The fact that they are appointed by the government mean that it is very simple to appoint a partisan governor however. The actions of the Governor were strongly condemned by CHP MPs Muharrem İnce and Adnan Keskin.

=== Media censorship ===
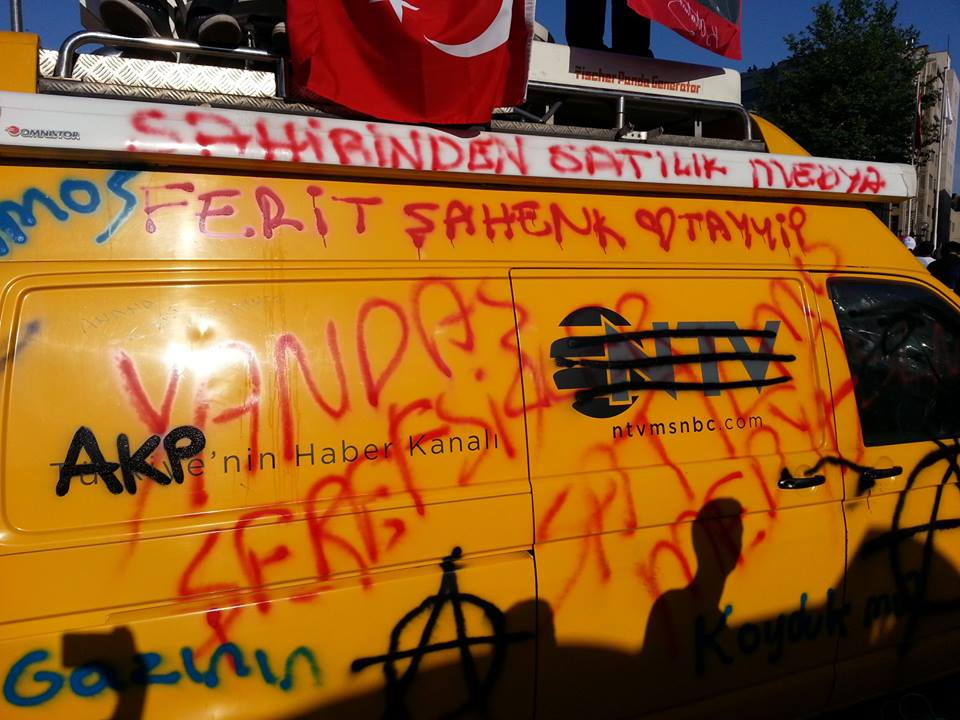
An NTV news van covered in anti-AKP protest graffiti in response to their lack of coverage of the Gezi Park protests in 2013

On 7 April, Twitter, Facebook, YouTube and 166 other websites were blocked for distributing the images of DHKP-C terrorists taking Istanbul prosecutor Mehmet Selim Kiraz hostage. The court responsible for the block argued that the images could be used as propaganda for the terrorist organisation and were distressing for the prosecutor's family. In addition, criminal investigations were launched into four newspapers that also features the images. The proximity of the block to the election, which bears similarity to the blocking of social media sites just weeks before the 2014 local elections, raised accusations of growing government censorship against opposition views. Allegations were also made that social media sites were blocked to stop potential incriminating evidence regarding the government's involvement in the hostage crisis from emerging.

The state-funded broadcaster Turkish Radio and Television Corporation (TRT) took the decision to not broadcast a campaign advert by the opposition CHP, because it was perceived to be openly critical of the governing AKP. The advert featured a cat walking near a transformer, seen as a reference to the AKP Minister of Energy Taner Yıldız's claims that nationwide electricity cuts during the 2014 local elections occurred due to cat entering a transformer. The TRT, which has previously been accused of pro-government bias, was accused of censorship and subsequently taken to court by the CHP. A CHP delegate to the media regulator RTÜK, Ali Öztunç, later claimed that the advert had not broken any laws and that the AKP was directly behind the censorship. A tradesman from Düzce sent the CHP to court for causing provocation and protesting rival parties by applauding, referencing the CHP's 'National Applause' themed election campaign. The individual was later discovered to be the director of public broadcasting for the pro-AKP Diriliş newspaper.

23 Turkish film-makers withdrew their films from the Istanbul Film Festival after a documentary set in PKK militant camps was withdrawn from the schedule. While the Ministry of Culture claimed that the documentary did not have the correct registration certificate, one film-maker claimed that the government were trying to increase their influence in the creative sector, similar to their record in the media sector. A documentary on the Gezi Park protests had been removed from the Antalya Golden Orange film festival in 2014.

On April 30, television presenter Cüneyt Özdemir claimed on Twitter that the press was under pressure from both financial and moral intimidation. He claimed that since he had joined the channel Kanal D he had come under increased intimidation from multiple sources, whom he said were 'scared' of an objective and neutral media. It was revealed by the broadcasting regulator RTÜK that between 1 and 7 May, the Turkish Radio and Television Corporation (TRT) did not broadcast a single opposition party electoral rally, instead focusing only on AKP ones. Several other smaller TV channels were also revealed to have given only a miniature amount of coverage to the opposition campaign in comparison to hours of coverage of the AKP.

=== Electricity cuts ===
Turkish elections have been increasingly sabotaged by electricity cuts during the vote counting process in recent years. The most recent example was the power cuts taking place on the eve of 30 March 2014, on the eve of the 2014 local elections. Energy minister Taner Yıldız caused outrage by blaming the power outages in 21 different provinces on a cat entering a transformer, which the BBC initially thought was an April fools joke. The opposition has alleged that electricity cuts on election nights are intentional and the commotion they cause is used to manipulate the counting process in the governments favour. Several whistleblowers within the AKP have also confirmed such allegations.

On 31 March, a nationwide blackout hit Turkey, causing disruption throughout the country for more than a day. The government have yet to confirm the reason behind the blackout, thought several theories by electrical engineers have proposed that such a large blackout could have been intentional or due to cyber terrorism. Opposition journalists and whistleblowers on Twitter put forward several accusations, claiming that the cuts were used to steal the passwords of the Supreme Electoral Council (YSK) or were an attempt to get voters used to electricity cuts so that a power outage on the eve of the election is not taken as a surprise.

Following the nationwide power blackout, the YSK requested electricity generators for election night.

=== Voting record irregularities ===
In Adana, 28,800 voters were erased from electoral register after the metropolitan municipality conducted a controversial opinion poll about peoples' voting intentions for the general election. It was also revealed that many CHP activists in Düsseldorf were assigned by the Supreme Electoral Council to vote in Greece instead, therefore being unable to cast their votes.

=== 'Perception operation' ===
Following similar allegations for the 2014 local elections and 2014 presidential election, the government have been accused of continuing to conduct a 'perception operation' (algı operasyonu) before the election through the use of disputed and fake opinion polls. The term 'algı operasyonu' has since become a common political term in Turkey, symbolising political bias within the media. Polling companies in Turkey rarely include a detailed breakdown of their operations and several poll companies, such as 'Pollmark', do not have any official records of existence. Many pollsters lack official websites and instead announce poll results on Facebook or Twitter, while some companies such as 'Politic's Communication and Research' have grammatical errors in their names that place their existence in doubt. Numerous polling companies are also owned by politicians, for example the owner of ANAR is AKP former Deputy Prime Minister Beşir Atalay.

The opinion polling for the 2014 presidential election was particularly controversial, with poll results varying substantially from the actual results. One polling company, KONDA, issued a letter of apology after predicting Recep Tayyip Erdoğan's vote to be above 57% three days before the election, whereas the actual result was 51.8%. The polling for the election was criticised by the owner of another polling company, Metropoll, who accused rival companies of conducting a 'perception operation' with their polls. The opposition Republican People's Party (CHP) and the Nationalist Movement Party (MHP) also criticised polling companies for confusing voters and being controlled by the government.

The CHP deputy leader Sezgin Tanrıkulu proposed a new law that would inflict a penalty fine on polling companies that had margins of error above 5 or 6% and declare them 'biased'. The proposed law would also impose custodial sentences on the companies' owners of between two and five years. Tanrıkulu claimed that polling companies had lost the trust of the electorate over the years and accused their inaccurate polling on contributing to a low turnout in the presidential elections. However, polling companies accused of supporting the opposition, such as SONAR, have also been accused of releasing bogus polls.

The manager of the Gezici polling organisation that works for the pro-opposition Sözcü newspaper, Murat Gezici, claimed that he had received death threats after releasing polling results that showed the AKP's vote share being below 40% in March 2015. He was later attacked outside his home.

According to several news agencies, no candidates applied to become CHP candidates in 11 electoral districts, with just one applying in four other districts. However, the CHP's spokesperson Haluk Koç later presented the lists of applications for these districts, falsifying the claims that no-one had applied. He claimed that the false stories were attempts to make the CHP look weaker prior to the election.

=== SEÇSİS controversy ===
The Supreme Electoral Council uses a system called SEÇSİS, a computer-aided central voter index system, in order to securely collect results and voter data. Its main aims are described to be to lower voter queues, allow voters to easily access information, reduce the number of complaints and also provide a basis for the eventual computerisation of voting. However, the system has received strong criticism for being susceptible to outside interference and hacking due to its use of Java. This has led to several opposition journalists and politicians to bring these claims before the Electoral Council and the Constitutional Court, accusing AKP politicians of using the system for their own gain. Eight months after initially being asked by CHP MPs, the Supreme Electoral Commission confirmed that the SEÇSİS system did not carry a security certificate, meaning that results entered into the system can be changed without notice.

In response to the revelations, the CHP claimed that it would take measures in order to stop the election being manipulated by SEÇSİS. The AKP MP Metin Külünk subsequently admitted that SEÇSİS had been developed under the influence of Fethullah Gülen, a common theory put forward by opposition journalists before 2013 when Gülen was aligned with the AKP. Külünk stated that due to Gülen's influence, the CHP would not have the 'luxury' to complain about SEÇSİS being used during future elections.

Following a proposal by the Liberal Democrat Party in 2014, results will now have to be uploaded to SEÇSİS as soon as possible in order to obtain results for each ballot box quicker online.

=== Misconduct during voting ===
During the voting process in Frankfurt, Germany, an Imam who was serving as an observer was caught while trying to vote for different people using different ID cards. Another Imam in Düsseldorf was caught openly telling people to vote for the AKP inside the polling area.

== Political violence ==
In December 2014, a football match between the teams from the CHP-run district of Yenimahalle and the AKP-run district of Gölbaşı in Ankara was cancelled due to a breakout of violence between the two sides. The match was due to have been refereed by the nephew of an AKP MP, which had initially led to a rise in tensions.

A MHP youth wing leader and Ege University student, Fırat Yılmaz Çakıroğlu was killed by PKK militants who raided the university in İzmir on 21 February. The HDP, which originates from Kurdish nationalist parties, blamed the government for not taking necessary precautions despite repeated threats. Three people were injured after clashes broke out between Turkish nationalists and HDP supporters in Erzurum after prayers were held in Çakıroğlu's memory. Tensions also rose between MHP-supporting university students and HDP activists in Adıyaman.

In March 2014, the manager of the Gezici polling company Murat Gezici, who conducts an opinion polls for the pro-opposition Sözcü newspaper, was attacked by three people outside his home after revealing an opinion poll that placed the AKP's vote share below 40%. Gezici had previously stated in an interview that he had received death threats.

=== May Day protests ===
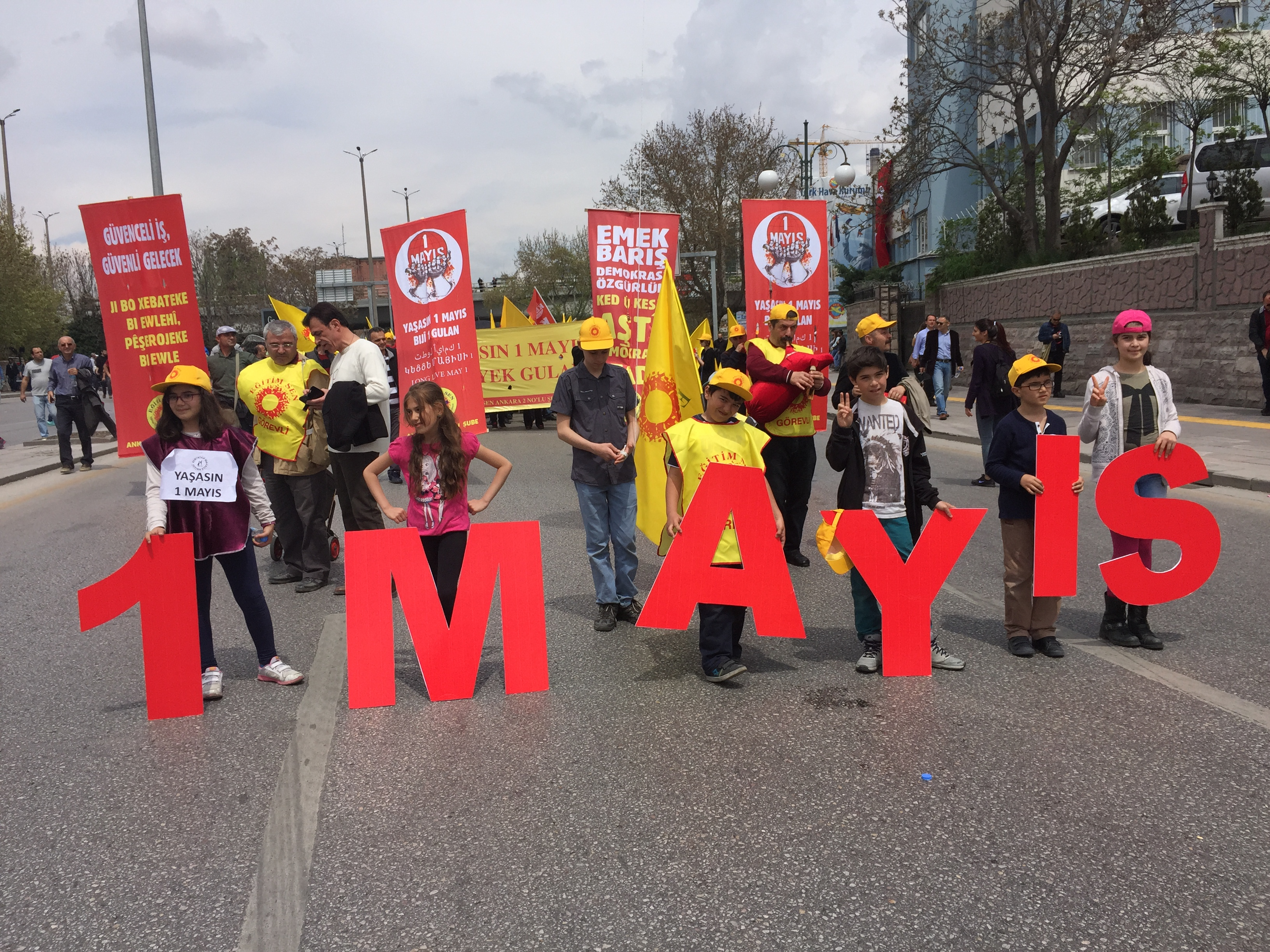
May Day protests in Ankara, 1 May 2015

Demonstrations taking place on Labour Day on May 1 have historically and notoriously been meet with a strong police response in Turkey, with the events on 1 May 1977 turning into a massacre in which 42 people were killed during demonstrations in Taksim Square. In preparation for the 2015 demonstrations, the government banned all demonstrations on Taksim Square and mobilised 10,000 police officers to curb protests. In ensuring clashes, protesters were met with tear gas and water cannon, to which some activists responded by throwing stones and firecrackers at the security forces. Despite the heavy police presence, communist activists were able to briefly enter Taksim square before being apprehended by police. During the clashes in Taksim, a stray dog who was perceived to be attempting to save a protester being detained by the police became popular on social media. CHP Member of Parliament Aykut Erdoğdu broke his hand after punching and breaking the class of a police escort vehicle containing arrested demonstrators, demanding to be taken with them. The escort vehicle refused to stop and attempted to run over the MP.

=== Attacks against political parties ===
Two people were arrested in connection to a shooting at the CHP district office in Maltepe, Istanbul. There were no casualties since the office was empty at the time. An armed individual was also arrested after entering the AKP Kartal district headquarters also in Istanbul with unknown intentions, shooting what was later determined to be blank rounds and hanging a Turkish flag accompanied with a sword. Later on 23 April, a CHP election campaign bus in Antalya was stoned by unknown perpetrators, smashing two windows but not causing any casualties.

On 18 April, armed men opened fire on the HDP headquarters, with two people later being taken into custody. Prime Minister Davutoğlu and President Erdoğan both condemned the attack, which occurred at 4 am when the building was empty. HDP chairman Selahattin Demirtaş claimed that 41 HDP election offices had been subject to arson attacks since the party's establishment.

On 19 April, a group of around 20 people, presumed to be Kurdish nationalists, attacked Patriotic Party parliamentary candidate Hasan Atilla Uğur. Uğur, the military officer responsible for interrogating Abdullah Öcalan following his capture, was criticised for interrogating Öcalan by the group, who proceeded to attack Patriotic Party offices. On 23 April, an armed attack on the AKP offices in Batman led to the death of the son of a former AKP Member of Parliament. The perpetrator was wounded and apprehended while trying to flee the scene. The incident was attributed to an asset-based dispute and not part of the wider political tensions.

On 24 April, an armed man waiting near a block of flats in Afyonkarahisar where Ahmet Davutoğlu's wife Sare Davutoğlu was due to visit was arrested on suspicion of a potential assassination attempt.

On 26 April, a HDP party office in Yalova was attacked by an armed gunman, who fired three shots at the office windows. Nobody was injured during the incident.

On 30 April, a HDP election stand in Uşak was approached by a mob, whom the stand's managers claimed were armed with clubs and were chanting anti-HDP slogans. Three people were injured during the ensuring fight, while the HDP leaflets and flags were burnt. The HDP activists were taken to a nearby HDP office under police escort.

On 2 May, AKP activists allegedly attacked members of the United June Movement (BHH) that had set up an election stand close to an AKP election stand in Kocamustafapaşa, Fatih, in Istanbul. 4 people were injured and large numbers of riot police and ambulances arrived at the scene. The fact that only BHH activists were arrested raised allegations of undercover AKP-police dealings and institutional political bias.

On 3 May, a delegation of AKP parliamentary candidates, youth and women's wing members visiting Van were booed and greeted with hostility by civilians. The police subsequently escorted the AKP delegation into a nearby HDP branch office where HDP members allegedly greeted them with applause. The police removed the license plates and placed iron bars on the AKP's cars for extra security. On the same day, some attendants at a nationalist march organised by the MHP in Rize attempted to break into a HDP branch office. While police managed to guard the office, several MHP supporters tore down HDP flags and burnt them during the rally. No-one was injured during the incident.

On 11 May, a group of AKP activists chased a CHP news van in Trabzon, throwing stones and chasing it for an hour, after which the CHP activists attempted to take refuge in a local police station. The AKP activists cut the tyres of the van and attempted to 'lynch' the CHP members in front of the police station. Four AKP members were questioned following the incident.

On 14 May, a group of Turkish nationalists began attacking HDP supporters who had been to an electoral rally in Kırşehir attended by Selahattin Demirtaş. With several HDP supporters reacting violently, riot police were called to the scene and used water cannon to disperse the crowds.

=== DHKP-C hostage crisis ===
On 31 March 2015, a nationwide blackout occurred in 49 out of the 81 Provinces of Turkey, disrupting transportation systems and lasting for much of the day. It was considered the worst power blackout for 15 years. The government responded by stating that all possible causes, including terrorism, would be considered when attempting to locate the cause. At the same time, President Erdoğan claimed that the blackout showed that the country needed to invest in nuclear energy. With relations between the government and president already appearing to be waning following a public disagreement between Erdoğan and Deputy Prime Minister Bülent Arınç, energy minister Taner Yıldız openly criticised the proposals to invest in nuclear power. His statement was perceived to be another indication that the relationship between the President and the government was widening. On 1 April, it was alleged that the electricity cut was caused intentionally by individuals loyal to Fethullah Gülen.

The blackout caused a political debate regarding possible motives, with electricity engineers alleging that such a large blackout continuing for almost a day was most likely caused intentionally. During the power-cut, two left-wing militants from the Revolutionary People's Liberation Party–Front (DHKP-C) infiltrated the Istanbul Justice Palace and abducted a prosecutor responsible for investigating the death of Berkin Elvan, who had been shot by police during the 2013 Gezi Park protests. The militants demanded information on the officer who shot Elvan in return for prosecutor Mehmet Selim Kiraz's release. Police forces later conducted an operation resulting in the death of the two terrorists and Kiraz, all of whom died from gunshot wounds.

The hostage crisis led to a debate about how militants managed to enter what currently is the largest courthouse in Europe with guns and flags without being stopped, as well as whether the incident and the massive power outage were related. Amid speculation that the government would use the incident to their own political gain, former Deputy Prime Minister Emrullah İşler claimed in a tweet that the militants were from the same organisation as the Gezi Park protesters in 2013. CHP leader Kemal Kılıçdaroğlu later publicly criticised the government for trying to associate his party with the terrorists. The mother of Şafak Yayla, one of the militants, accused the government of hiding the real perpetrators behind the hostage crisis and killing her son instead. A similar situation had occurred in January, where DHKP-C claimed responsibility for a suicide bombing, before removing this claim from their website when the perpetrator was later linked to ISIS instead.

== Influence of Recep Tayyip Erdoğan ==
The election campaign also faced controversy due to the heavy involvement of President Recep Tayyip Erdoğan both in public campaigning and private decision making concerning the AKP's election campaign. Erdoğan, who founded and led the AKP for 13 years, was elected President in 2014 by direct vote and thus was constitutionally required to sever all ties with the AKP and remain neutral in political affairs. Critics of the AKP and Erdoğan, however, have accused the President of openly being partisan.

=== 'Public opening' rallies ===
During the run-up to the election, President Recep Tayyip Erdoğan declared his intentions to hold rallies in all 81 Provinces of Turkey under the guise of 'public openings'. Most opposition and media commentators, however, have denounced the excuse of 'public openings' as a sham and have branded Erdoğan's rallies as an open political intervention by a constitutionally neutral President. Despite numerous formal complaints by the CHP, MHP and HDP, the Supreme Electoral Council of Turkey refused to stop Erdoğan from holding his rallies. During his speeches at these rallies, Erdoğan has been criticised for his political bias in favour of the AKP. During a rally in Siirt, Erdoğan criticised the CHP leader Kemal Kılıçdaroğlu for allegedly questioning his faith in the Quran. During a 1 May Labour Day speech, he also criticised the opposition parties for their promise to raise the minimum wage, though he faced controversy himself when he revealed that he did not know the current minimum wage. Erdoğan has also implicitly called for the electorate to grant the AKP at least 400 Members of Parliament in the general election, and admitted that his rallies were being funded by public money.

Most opposition politicians and journalists have denounced Erdoğan's rallies as a farce. It emerged that most of the new projects or foundations of new infrastructure that Erdoğan had claimed to inaugurate did not actually exist, with no lists of official openings being made available for the rallies. The real reason behind Erdoğan holding rallies was therefore perceived to be for political reasons aiding the AKP. Most of Erdoğan's rallies have been marked by a poor turnout, with a surprisingly small turnout in İzmir despite voters being shuttled in from neighbouring provinces being openly mocked by social media. Due to a poor turnout in Van, Erdoğan was forced to delay his appearance. It has been claimed that several public organisations and companies have been told to forcefully send their employees to the rallies in order to increase turnout. For the opening of Hakkari Yüksekova Airport where both President Erdoğan and Prime Minister Davutoğlu were in attendance, the Governor of Hakkari issued a statement revoking all leaves of absence for the day and threatened any public workers who did not attend with legal action.

Controversy arose when Erdoğan and the Patriotic Party wanted to conduct a rally at the same time and at the same place in Adana. The issue was taken to the Supreme Electoral Council, which decided that both could conduct their rallies at different times on the same day.

== See also ==
- Controversies during the Turkish general election, November 2015
