= Sakallı, Bağlar =

Village in Turkey

Sakallı
- Neighbourhood
- Location in Turkey
- Coordinates: 37°50′48″N 39°53′03″E
- Country: Turkey
- Province: Diyarbakır
- District: Bağlar
- Population (2022): 859
- Time zone: UTC+3 (TRT)

Sakallı is a neighbourhood in the municipality and district of Bağlar, Diyarbakır Province in Turkey. Its population is 859 (2022).
