= March 2016 Diyarbakır bombing =

Terrorist incident in Turkey

- Part of Kurdish–Turkish conflict (2015–present)
- Location of Diyarbakır Province in Turkey
- Location: Diyarbakır, Turkey
- Date: 31 March 2016
- Attack type: Car bombing
- Deaths: 7
- Injuries: 27
- Perpetrator: PKK

A car bomb, targeting an armored vehicle transporting police personnel on the 31 March 2016, exploded close to a bus terminal in the Bağlar district of Diyarbakır, Turkey, killing at least seven police officers and wounding 27 more people, including 13 officers, according to a joint statement by Turkish officials and the police. The attack comes on the third day of the Turkish Governments Ministers meetings in Diyarbakır concerning the reconstruction of the Sur district and one day before Turkish Prime Minister Ahmet Davutoğlu's scheduled visit to the city. On April 1, 2016, the PKK's military wing, the HPG, claimed responsibility for the attack.

== See also ==
- 2008 Diyarbakır bombing
- 2015 Diyarbakır rally bombing
- Siege of Sur (2016)
- February 2016 Diyarbakır bombing
