= Oğlaklı, Bağlar =

Village in Turkey

Oğlaklı
- Neighbourhood
- Location in Turkey
- Coordinates: 37°52′37″N 39°56′39″E
- Country: Turkey
- Province: Diyarbakır
- District: Bağlar
- Population (2022): 1,692
- Time zone: UTC+3 (TRT)

Oğlaklı is a neighbourhood in the municipality and district of Bağlar, Diyarbakır Province in Turkey. It is populated by Kurds of the Îzol tribe and had a population of 1,692 in 2022.
