= Övündüler, Bağlar =

Village in Turkey

Övündüler
- Neighbourhood
- Location in Turkey
- Coordinates: 37°52′52″N 39°55′05″E
- Country: Turkey
- Province: Diyarbakır
- District: Bağlar
- Population (2022): 943
- Time zone: UTC+3 (TRT)

Övündüler is a neighbourhood in the municipality and district of Bağlar, Diyarbakır Province in Turkey. Its population is 943 (2022).
