= Lisa Calan =

Kurdish filmmaker

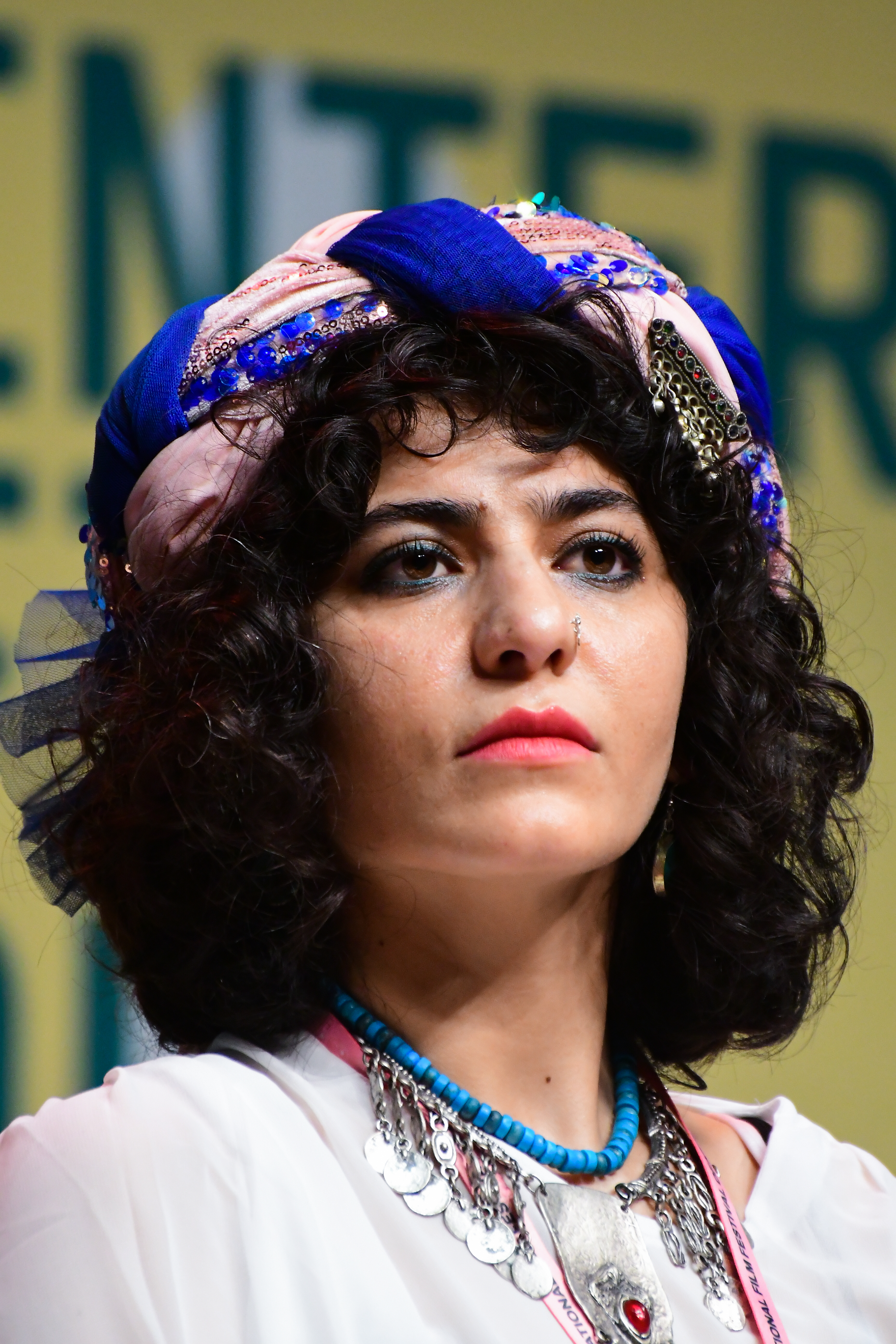
- Lisa Calan at IFFK, Thiruvananthapuram, in 2022
- Occupations: Film Direction; Script writing; Art direction
- Years active: 2014–present

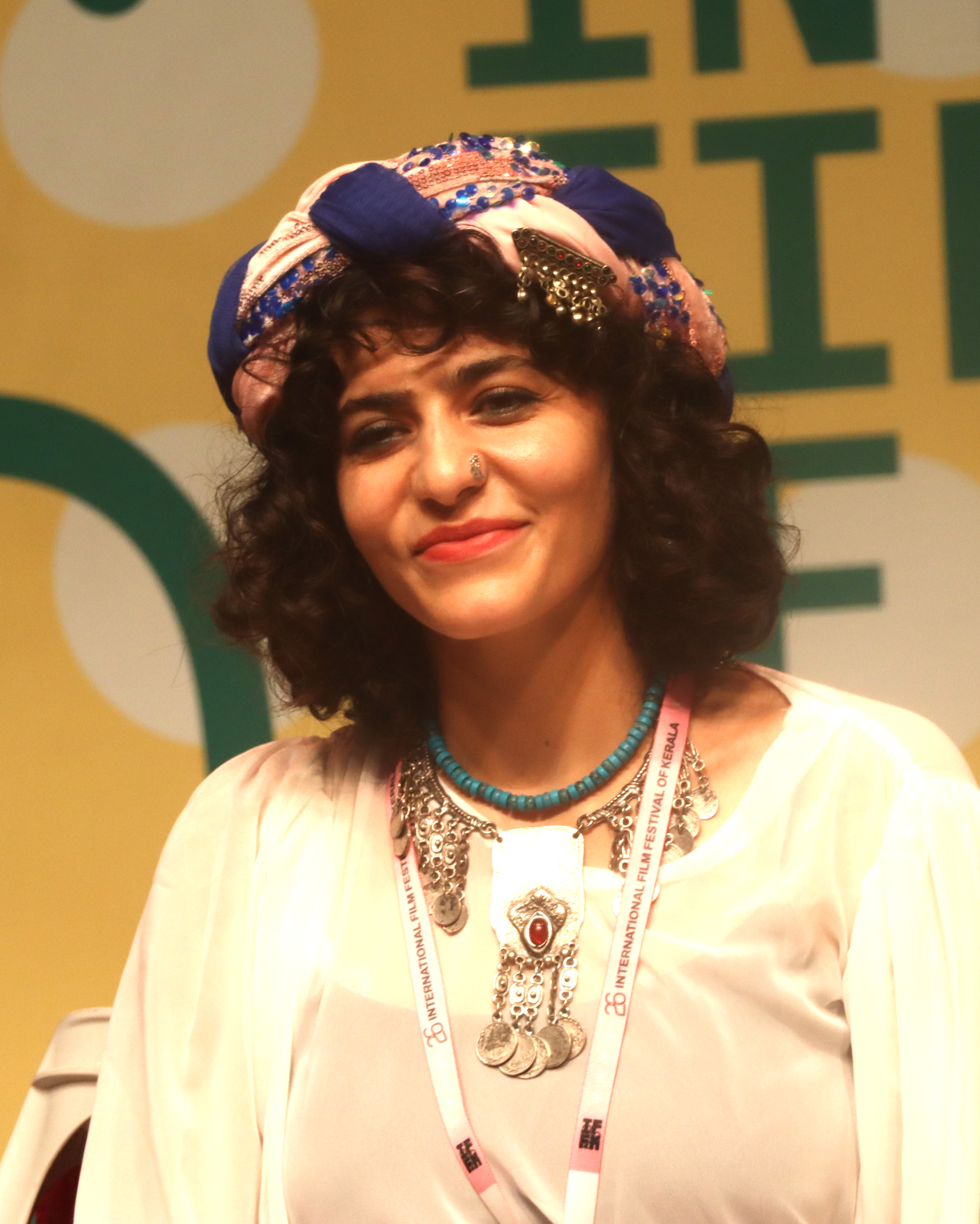
Lisa Calan

Lisa Calan is a Kurdish filmmaker who lost both of her legs in a terrorist attack in Turkey in 2015 by the IS. She has made a short film and has participated in several feature films, documentaries and TV series projects. The artist lost both her legs in the 2015 Amed bombing, in which an Islamic State bomber detonated a bomb at a Democratic People's Party (HDP) rally in Amed on June 5, killing more than 5 people and injuring more than 100. Thereafter, she lived in Ankara for two years, receiving treatment in Germany and Australia. She graduated from the Aram Tigran Film Academy in Amed. In 2016, she worked for Diyarbakır City Council under a contract with the city's Department of Culture and Social Affairs, until the City Council terminated his contract. She also worked at the Amed Middle East Film Academy and participated in several film festivals as a screenwriter. In 2014, she directed the film Zimana Çîya (Language of the Mountains), which emphasizes the assimilation and prohibition of the Kurdish language. He was also the actor in the film Vesarti (Confidential) in 2015, as well as the artistic director.

She was presented the Spirit of Cinema award during the inaugural function of the 26th International Film Festival of Kerala by the Chief Minister of Kerala, Pinarayi Vijayan.
