= Ortaören, Bağlar =

Village in Turkey

Ortaören
- Neighbourhood
- Location in Turkey
- Coordinates: 37°51′10″N 39°57′36″E
- Country: Turkey
- Province: Diyarbakır
- District: Bağlar
- Population (2022): 361
- Time zone: UTC+3 (TRT)

Ortaören is a neighbourhood in the municipality and district of Bağlar, Diyarbakır Province in Turkey. Its population is 361 (2022).
