= Yiğityolu, Bağlar =

Village in Turkey

Yiğityolu
- Neighbourhood
- Location in Turkey
- Coordinates: 37°52′17″N 39°53′07″E
- Country: Turkey
- Province: Diyarbakır
- District: Bağlar
- Population (2022): 613
- Time zone: UTC+3 (TRT)

Yiğityolu is a neighbourhood in the municipality and district of Bağlar, Diyarbakır Province in Turkey. Its population is 613 (2022).
