= September 2012 Beytüşşebap attack =

- Part of Kurdish–Turkish conflict
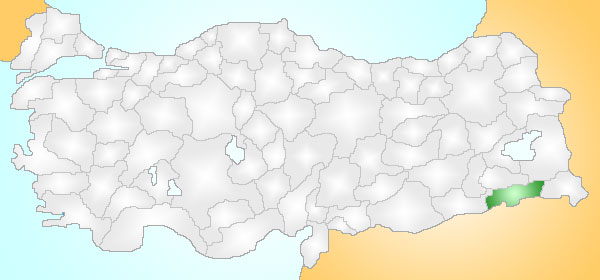
Location	Beytüşşebap

Belligerents
Turkey	PKK

Casualties and losses
10 killed 8 wounded	28 killed

The September 2012 Beytüşşebap attack in the Southeastern Anatolia Region of Turkey occurred on the night of September 2, 2012. According to Governor of Şırnak Province, the attack began 22.00, and he said that as a result of the attack, ten Turkish soldiers died and eight soldiers were injured. One of the injured soldiers died later in Şırnak Hospital. In the following days clashes were reported to continue.
