= November 2016 Diyarbakır bombing =

Bombing in Diyarbakır, Turkey

Coordinates: 37.9108°N 40.2367°E

- Part of Turkey–ISIL conflict or Kurdish-Turkish conflict
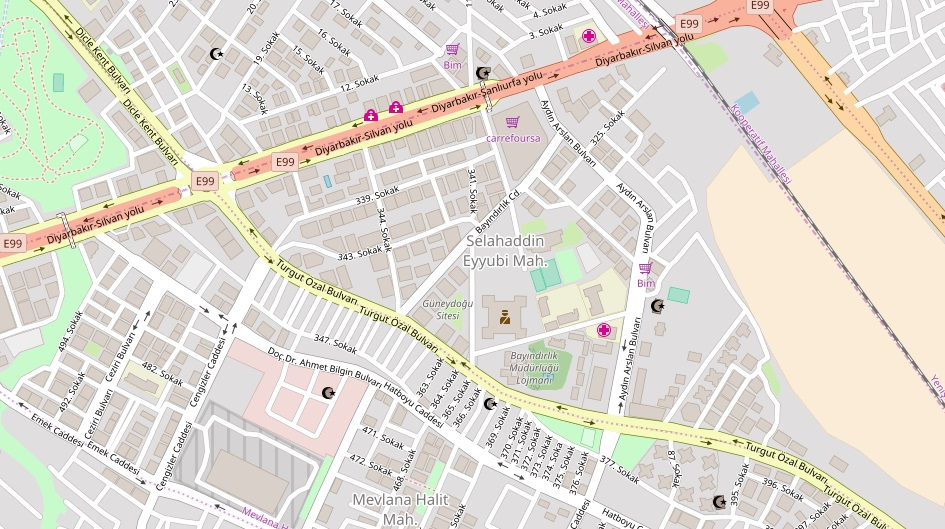
- Diyarbakır
- Location: Diyarbakır, Turkey
- Date: 4 November 2016
- Attack type: Bombing
- Deaths: 11
- Injuries: 100
- Perpetrator: Islamic State of Iraq and the Levant

The November 2016 Diyarbakır bombing was an explosion near a police building in Bağlar, Diyarbakır in Turkey, on 4 November. The bomb killed at least 11 people, including two policemen. Both the Islamic State of Iraq and the Levant and the Kurdistan Freedom Hawks claimed responsibility for the bombing.

== See also ==
- February 2016 Diyarbakır bombing
- March 2016 Diyarbakır bombing
- May 2016 Diyarbakır bombing
- List of terrorist incidents in November 2016
