= May 2016 Diyarbakır bombing =

Terrorist incident in Turkey

- Part of Kurdish–Turkish conflict
- Diyarbakır Province highlighted within Turkey
- Location: Diyarbakır, Turkey
- Date: 10 May 2016; 10:50 (GMT+2)
- Target: Police vehicle carrying suspected members of the PKK
- Attack type: Car bomb
- Deaths: 3
- Injuries: At least 45
- Perpetrators: People's Defence Forces, the armed wing of the PKK

The May 2016 Diyarbakır bombing was a car bomb attack on an armored police vehicle in the Bağlar district of Diyarbakır, Turkey on Tuesday 10 May 2016 at approximately 10:50 local time. The attack, which targeted a police vehicle that was carrying officers escorting seven recently arrested Kurdish militants, killed 3 people (Kurdish militants) and wounded at least 45 others including 12 police officers. The vehicle was carrying seven detainees, suspected members of the Kurdistan Workers Party (PKK) to a routine health check. The PKK's armed wing, the People's Defense Forces (HPG), later claimed that one of its trucks was transporting explosives and got shot, making it explode.

== See also ==
- February 2016 Diyarbakır bombing
- March 2016 Diyarbakır bombing
- 2015 Diyarbakır rally bombings
