= Alankoz, Bağlar =

Village in Turkey

Alankoz
- Neighbourhood
- Location in Turkey
- Coordinates: 37°49′32″N 40°00′07″E
- Country: Turkey
- Province: Diyarbakır
- District: Bağlar
- Population (2022): 537
- Time zone: UTC+3 (TRT)

Alankoz (formerly: Yalankoz) is a neighbourhood in the municipality and district of Bağlar, Diyarbakır Province in Turkey. It is populated by Kurds of the Dodikan tribe and had a population of 537 in 2022.
