= Cizre operation (2015) =

Turkish military operation in Cizre

Siege of Cizre (September 2015)
- Part of Kurdish–Turkish conflict (2015–present) and 2015–16 Şırnak clashes (Kurdish–Turkish conflict)
| Date | September 4–11, 2015 |
| Location | Cizre, Şırnak Province, Turkey |
| Result | Continued standoff until December 2015–February 2016 Cizre curfew |

Belligerents
| Turkey: Turkish Armed Forces Gendarmerie; Turkish Police Force | PKK: YDG-H |

Casualties and losses
| 25 police officers injured | 40 killed |
- 160 civilians killed (allegedly)

During the Kurdish–Turkish conflict (2015–present), in September Turkish security forces launched an operation in Cizre. The Turkish security forces sealed off the city and placed a curfew for eight days, from September 4–11. The town had limited access to water and food and many of the injured were prohibited to receive professional medical treatment. The Council of Europe raised concerns about "disproportionate use of force by security forces against civilians." Leyla İmret, the mayor of Cizre at the time, was forcefully removed from her post under charges of supporting terrorism.

On September 10, Sezgin Tanrıkulu, deputy chair of the Republican People's Party (CHP), criticized the siege of Cizre and demanded an end to the week-long curfew. Amnesty International expressed concern at disproportionate measures taken by Turkish authorities such as "indefinite, round-the-clock curfew", "blocking all access to the city", "cutting electricity, water and communications to the entire population of Cizre". A march towards Cizre against the operation in which about 50 parliamentarians of the Peoples' Democratic Party (HDP) was stopped in İdil by the Turkish security forces. The Turkish military wouldn't allow even the passage of two Ministers of the Turkish Government, claiming Cizre to be in an area where only the military had access. The Kurdish MPs answered that they were not expecting to be threatened by the people in Cizre andSelahattin Demirtas drew comparisons between the Siege of Kobani and Cizre. On September 12, Nils Muižnieks, human rights commissioner for the Council of Europe, expressed concern over claims of "disproportionate use of force" against civilians in Cizre and called on Turkey to allow access to independent observers.

On September 11, Turkey announced that it would lift the curfew temporarily, however the open-ended curfew was reimposed two days later.

According to a report by the Turkish Medical Association, the security forces severely restricted medical staff in their work and armoured vehicles with snipers were parked on the hospital grounds and occupied the emergency rooms.

The clashes resulted in a continued standoff between Turkish security forces and YDG-H and were followed by the December 2015–February 2016 Cizre curfew.

== Casualties ==
According to the Turkish regional governor, forty PKK members were killed in Cizre operation during an eight days curfew. He added that seventeen suspected militants had been detained in operations during the curfew, 25 police officers were injured in security operations and seven guarded police vehicles were damaged as militants carried out attacks with 21 rockets, 19 hand grenades, and two road-side bombings.

International media reported as many as 12-20 civilians were reported killed.

== See also ==
- December 2015–February 2016 Cizre curfew
- Kurdistan
- Kurds in Turkey
- 2015–16 Şırnak clashes
