= Batıçanakçı, Bağlar =

Batıçanakçı
- Neighbourhood
- Location in Turkey
- Coordinates: 37.87592°N 40.14832°E
- Country: Turkey
- Province: Diyarbakır
- District: Bağlar
- Population (2025): 1,059
- Time zone: UTC+3 (TRT)

Batıçanakçı (Note: Formerly known as Garbiçanakçı, Tchakanian, Tchako, Chanaqchi, Tjanakeji, Tjanakji, Tschanaqtschi, Çarıklıfabrikasköyü, Chakanian, or Chako.) (Kurdish: Çanaxçiya garbî) is a neighbourhood of the municipality and district of Bağlar, Diyarbakır Province, Turkey. It is populated by Kurds and have a population of 1,059 in 2025.

== History ==
Tchakanian (today called Batıçanakçı) was historically inhabited by Armenians and Syriac Orthodox Christians. There were 10 Armenian hearths in 1880. It was located in the Diyarbakır central district (merkez kaza) in the Diyarbakır sanjak in the Diyarbekir vilayet in c. 1900. In 1914, it was inhabited by 100 Syriacs, according to the list presented to the Paris Peace Conference by the Assyro-Chaldean delegation. Amidst the Sayfo, on 3 May 1915, men from Tchakanian and other neighbouring small villages were seized and taken by a death squad led by Shakir Bey and members of the Rama tribe led by Ömer to a pit near the village of Hawar-Dejla, where they were shot. In total, 164 men were killed.

== Bibliography ==
- Gaunt, David (2006). Massacres, Resistance, Protectors: Muslim-Christian Relations in Eastern Anatolia during World War I. Gorgias Press.
- Jongerden, Joost; Verheij, Jelle, eds. (2012). Social Relations in Ottoman Diyarbekir, 1870-1915. Brill.
- Kévorkian, Raymond H. (2006). "Demographic Changes in the Armenian Population of Diarbekir, 1895-1914". In Richard G. Hovannisian (ed.). Armenian Tigranakert/Diarbekir and Edessa/Urfa. Mazda Publishers.
- Tîgrîs, Amed; Çakar, Yıldız (2012). Amed : erdnîgarî, dîrok, çand (in Kurdish).
