= 2008 Diyarbakır bombing =

Terrorist incident in Turkey

Coordinates: 37.91441°N 40.230629°E

- Diyarbakır Province highlighted within Turkey
- Location: Diyarbakır, Turkey
- Date: 3 January 2008; 16:50 – (UTC+2)
- Attack type: Car bombing
- Deaths: 5
- Injuries: 110

On 3 January 2008, at an estimated local time of 16:50 (14:50 UTC), a car bomb exploded in the city of Diyarbakır in south-eastern Turkey.

== Target ==
First reports from the area indicated that the bomb, which exploded in the Dagkapi neighborhood of Diyarbakır on Thursday evening, targeted a military service vehicle that was carrying 46 army personnel as it passed near a school. The district is known to have a heavy Turkish military presence because due a military helicopter base, hospitals and military housings in the area. The explosion could be heard 3 km (two miles) away.

The attack occurred during rush hour.

== Casualties ==
According to Bianet 7 people died in the attack, five were children who attended the school beside the site of the bombing. About 110 other people were wounded, eight people seriously.

== Perpetrators ==
Nobody has claimed responsibility for the blast, but authorities have blamed militants of the outlawed Kurdistan Workers Party (PKK), whom Turkish security forces are fighting both in Turkey and in nearby northern Iraq. The state Anatolian news agency quoted prosecutors as saying that four people had been detained in connection with the blast. Earlier, security sources said 12 people had been detained. During a manifestation, Sezgin Tanrikulu, the president of the Diyarbakır Bar Association read out a message on behalf of several worker unions, criticizing the violence.

=== Reaction ===
Turkey: "This (bombing) is an attack against our people, especially our people in the southeast, in Diyarbakır. The terrorist organisation has never been the representative of our Kurdish citizens," Prime Minister Tayyip Erdogan said in Ankara. Erdogan also told reporters he would visit Diyarbakır two days after the bombing. General Yasar Buyukanit, head of Turkey's military General Staff, was due to visit the city on the day after the bombing.

United States: This incident has once more showed the necessity of cooperation in fight against terrorism, Chase Beamer, spokesman for the Department's Bureau of European & Eurasian Affairs, told A.A correspondent. Beamer also said Washington is beside Ankara in its fight against terror.
