= February 2016 Lice bombing =

Terrorist incident in Turkey

- Part of Kurdish–Turkish conflict (2015–present)
- Location of Diyarbakır Province in Turkey
- Location: Lice, Diyarbakır, Turkey
- Date: 18 February 2016 (UTC+02:00)
- Attack type: Bombing, Improvised explosive device
- Weapon: an explosive device
- Deaths: 6 soldiers
- Injuries: 1 soldier
- Perpetrator: People's Defence Forces
- Motive: Kurdish–Turkish conflict

The February 2016 Lice bombing occurred on 18 February 2016 in Lice, a city in Diyarbakır Province, Turkey. The bombing consisted of a roadside bomb that killed 6 soldiers and injured another.

The Kurdish HPG forces claimed responsibility for the attack.

== See also ==
- March 2016 Diyarbakır bombing
- 2008 Diyarbakır bombing
- 2015 Diyarbakır rally bombing
- February 2016 Ankara bombing, which occurred the day before
