= 2015 Diyarbakır rally bombings =

ISIL bombing of a Peoples' Democratic Party rally in Turkey

- Part of Electoral fraud and violence during the June 2015 Turkish general election
- Location: 37°54′48″N 40°13′1″E; Diyarbakır, Turkey
- Date: 5 June 2015; 17:55 (EEST)
- Target: Peoples' Democratic Party supporters
- Attack type: Bombing
- Deaths: 5
- Injuries: 100+ (some claimed 400+)
- Perpetrator: (Islamic State) Dokumacılar

The 2015 Diyarbakır rally bombings occurred on 5 June 2015 in Diyarbakır, Turkey, during an electoral rally of the Peoples' Democratic Party (HDP) at 17:55 local time. The bombing took place two days before the June 2015 general election and killed 5 supporters, injuring over 100. A suspect known to be close to ISIL was arrested on June 6 in Gaziantep. By August, suspicions as for the perpetrators had continued to lie on ISIL.

The HDP, having been identified as a mainly pro-Kurdish party, had been targeted on numerous occasions prior to the bombing, with party offices being faced with arson attacks and vandalism. Two bombs had previously exploded in the HDP's Adana and Mersin branch offices, injuring three party activists. The HDP's Diyarbakır rally was due to take place on 5 June, which was the last day before the election in which rallies were allowed.

Two bombs exploded at the rally, just before the party's chairman Selahattin Demirtaş was scheduled to speak. Initial reports by Mehdi Eker, the Ministry of Food, Agriculture and Livestock, claimed that two people were killed, and over 100 were injured, with the rally being disbanded following the incident. Initial reports that the explosions could have been caused by the transformers nearby were dismissed by Taner Yıldız, the Minister of Energy and Natural Resources, who stated that an investigation by the Ministry revealed that the transformers had been tampered with from the outside.

The Prime Minister, Ahmet Davutoğlu, offered his sympathies with the wounded and called the bombing a 'provocation' just 48 hours before election day.

== Background ==
Political violence in the run-up to the general election targeted all of the major contesting parties, with campaign offices, candidates, party vehicles and supporters all being subject to attacks and vandalism. The HDP in particular, having been identified as a mainly pro-Kurdish party, had faced attacks from Turkish nationalists. The party's co-chair Selahattin Demirtaş stated on 5 May 2015 that 41 HDP offices had been subject to arson attacks since the party's establishment. The HDP's Adana and Mersin branch offices were also bombed in May, injuring three party activists. The HDP frequently claimed that the political responsibility for attacks against their party lay with the governing Justice and Development Party (AKP), which Demirtaş argued had been causing political polarisation and inciting violence.

== Bombing ==
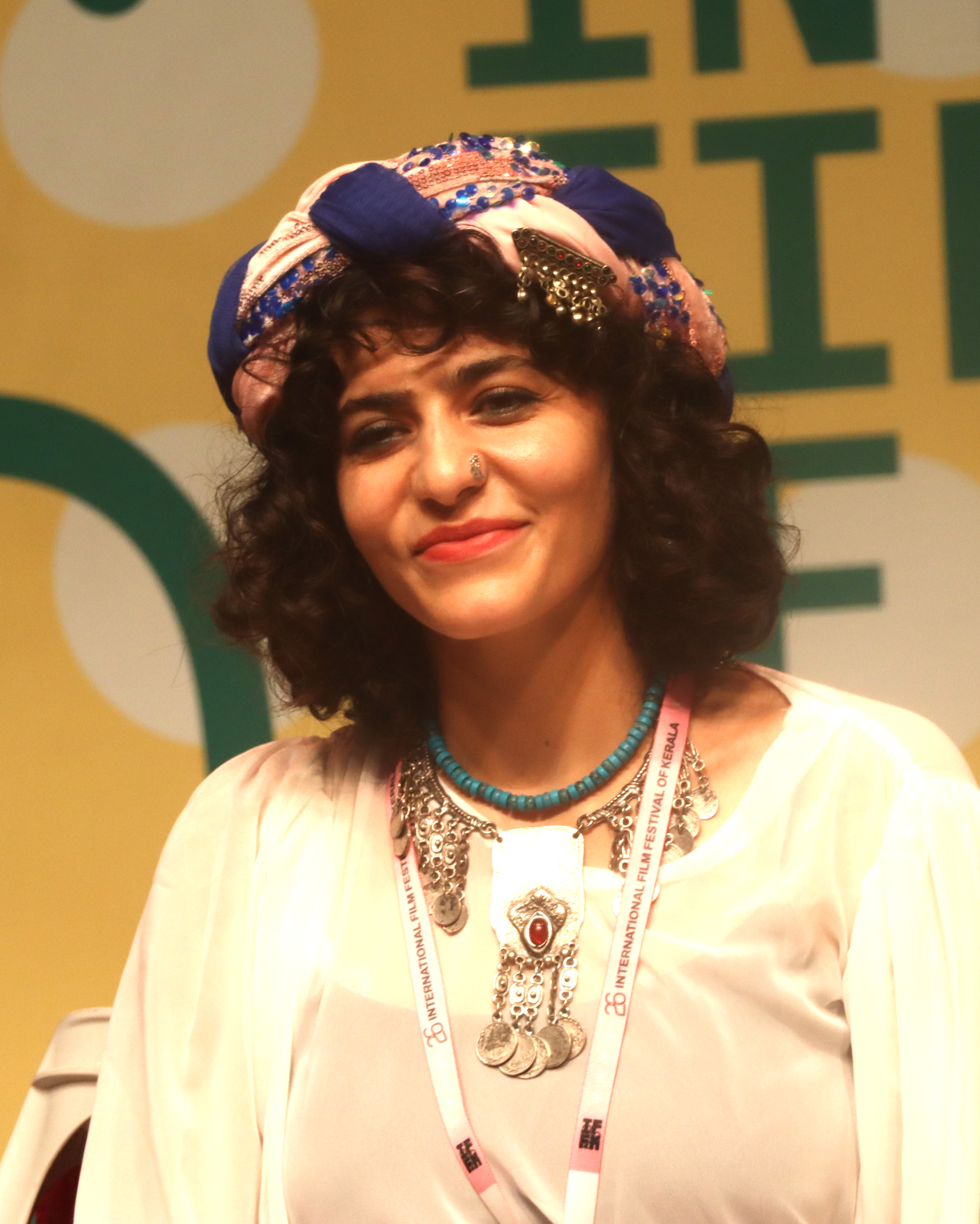
Lisa Calan, a Kurdish film director who lost both her legs in the bombing.

With Selahattin Demirtaş due to begin his speech, two separate bombs exploded within the crowd. Initial reports claimed that two supporters were killed in the initial blast, with two others succumbing to their injuries in hospital at later dates. Press reporters were divided on the number of injured supporters, with some stating that close to 100 were injured, some claiming that 184 were injured, some claiming that there were more than 200 and some even claiming that over 400 were injured. Announcements were made in both Turkish and Kurdish to attendees at the rally to make way for ambulances and to not succumb to provocations. The rally was subsequently abandoned.

== Investigation ==
It was alleged that the explosions could have come from the transformers nearby, though investigators from the Ministry of Energy and Natural Resources later identified that the transformers had been tampered with from the outside. A new allegation pointed towards the use of fragmentation bombs thrown in dustbins in the area.

The Attorney General of Diyarbakır launched an official investigation into the attack shortly after the bombings, with the Governor of Diyarbakır forming a crisis meeting.

== Perpetrators ==
- The HDP held the Islamic State of Iraq and the Levant (ISIL) responsible, with a suspect being arrested in Gaziantep on June 6. The suspect, Orhan Gönder, was alleged to have actively participated in ISIL's war efforts and to have attended ISIL training camps in Syria.
- On 20 July 2015 after a bombing took place in Suruç, Şanlıurfa Province, an unidentified spokesman alleged that Orhan Gönder and the suspect in the Suruç bombing, Seyh Abdurrahman Alagöz, were both part of an ISIL-linked terrorist cell named the 'Dokumacılar' (Weavers) that targets the Kurdish People's Protection Units (YPG).
- An alleged militant from the separatist Kurdistan Workers' Party (PKK) in July 2015 voluntarily turned himself in to the Turkish Gendarmerie in Kars and claimed that the PKK had staged the bombing by bringing suitcases filled with bombs to the scene of the electoral rally, hoping to increase the HDP's votes following the incident.

== Reactions ==
The Prime Minister of Turkey, Ahmet Davutoğlu, offered his sympathies to the wounded and said that the attack was a provocation. The main opposition leader Kemal Kılıçdaroğlu also claimed that the attack was a provocation. In a statement after the bombing, HDP chairman Selahattin Demirtaş claimed that the attack intended to destabilise the south-east and also claimed that Hezbollah and ISIL forces had entered Turkey.

== See also ==
- 2015 Suruç bombing
- 2015 Istanbul suicide bombing
- 2013 Reyhanlı car bombings
