= People's Defence Forces =

Military wing of the group Kurdistan Workers' Party

People's Defence Forces Hêzên Parastina Gel (HPG)
- Flag of the HPG
- Leaders: Abdullah Öcalan; Murat Karayilan
- Founded: January 2000
- Dates active: 2000–2025
- Allegiance: Kurdistan Workers' Party
- Active regions: Turkey; Iraq; Syria
- Ideology: Democratic confederalism Communalism
- Status: Rojava–Islamist conflict Kurdistan Region–PKK conflict Ongoing war with Turkey, after ceasefire ended
- Size: Over 40,000 active fighters (2015 Turkish claim)

The People's Defence Forces (Kurdish: Hêzên Parastina Gel, HPG) was the military wing of the group Kurdistan Workers' Party (PKK). During the 7th Congress of the PKK in January 2000, the HPG replaced the former military wing of the PKK, the People's Liberation Army of Kurdistan (Artêşa Rizgariya Gelê Kurdistan, ARGK). The replacement was intended to demonstrate the search for a peaceful solution of the Kurdish-Turkish conflict, after the capture of Abdullah Öcalan in 1999. The HPG played an active role in the peace negotiations between the Turkish Government and the PKK in 2013, as it hosted a delegation consisting of several politicians from the Peace and Democracy Party (BDP) and members of the Turkish Human Rights Association (IHD) and agreed to release soldiers of the Turkish army as well as a Turkish politician, who they held captive. In 2014, the HPG was involved in the fight against the Islamic State (ISIS) in Sinjar.

As far as can be judged from the publications, one of the basic HPG factions is called "Karela Forces" or "Al-Karila Forces" (Arabic: قوات الكاريلا, romanized: Quwwat al-Karila) meaning "guerrilla" and this name is mainly mentioned in Arabic texts regarding HPG actions. In Arabic texts, and later among its members and supporters, Karila or Gerîla has become an alternative name for People's Defence Forces in general.

== History ==
In 1984, the PKK declared they chose the method of "people's revolution" developed by Mao Zedong, and then started to apply guerrilla warfare methods in Kurdistan.

During this period, the organization declared a "long-term people's war" and established an organization called the Kurdistan Liberation Forces (Kurdish: Hêzên Rizgarîya Kurdistanê, HRK), describing as "Armed Propaganda". On August 15, 1984, the "July 14 Armed Propaganda Unit" under the command of Mahsum Korkmaz carried out the first armed attacks of the organization in Eruh and Şemdinli.

At the 3rd congress of the PKK held in Lebanon on October 25, 1986, the HRK, which was based on propaganda, was abolished and a new militia called the "Kurdistan People's Liberation Army" was established, which was based on powerful armed attacks. This structure carried out attacks between 1991 and 1993.

On 12 May 2025, the Kurdistan Workers' Party announced it would disband as part of a peace initiative with Turkey.
