= Bağlar, Diyarbakır =

Bağlar
- District and municipality
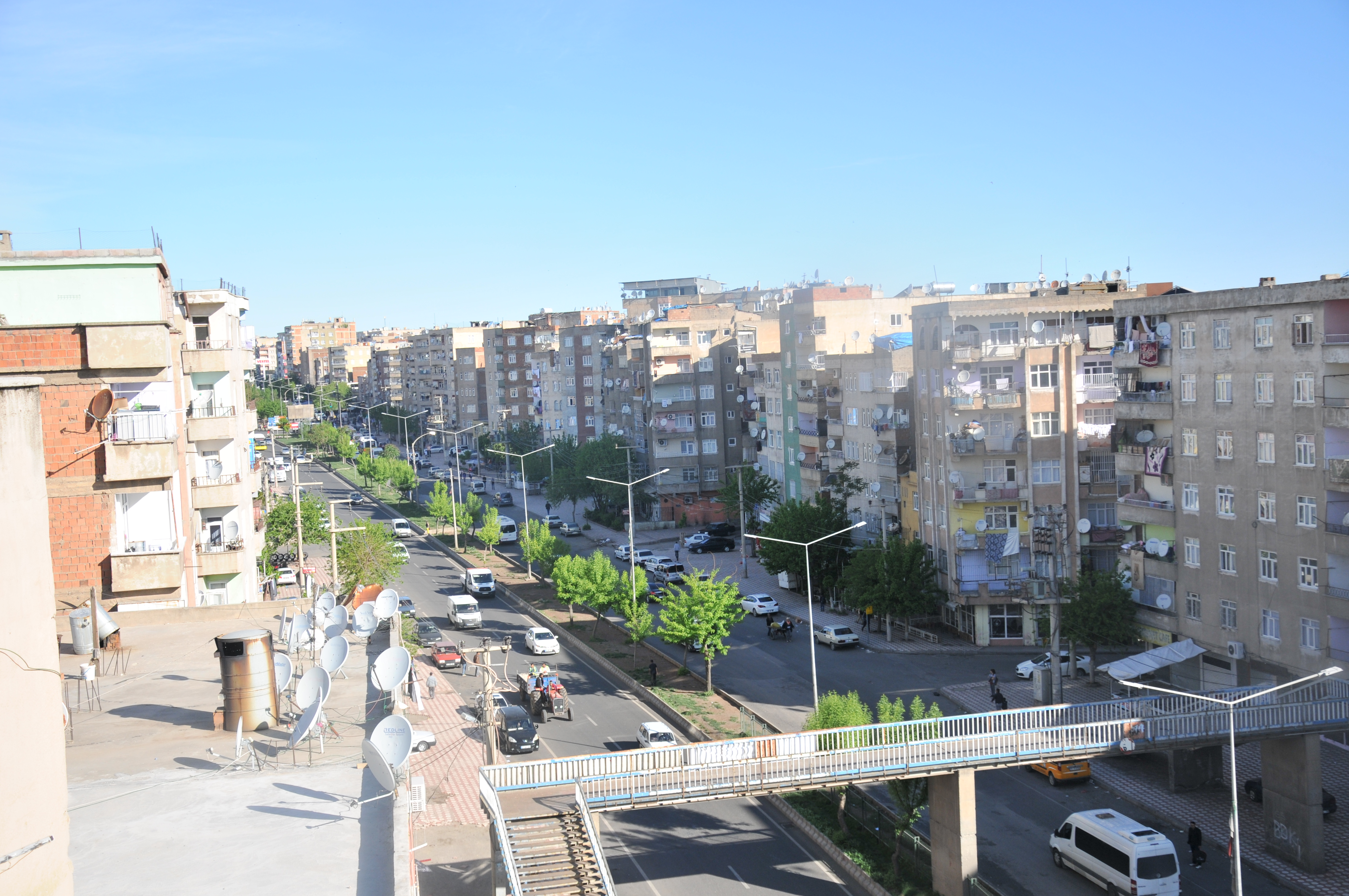

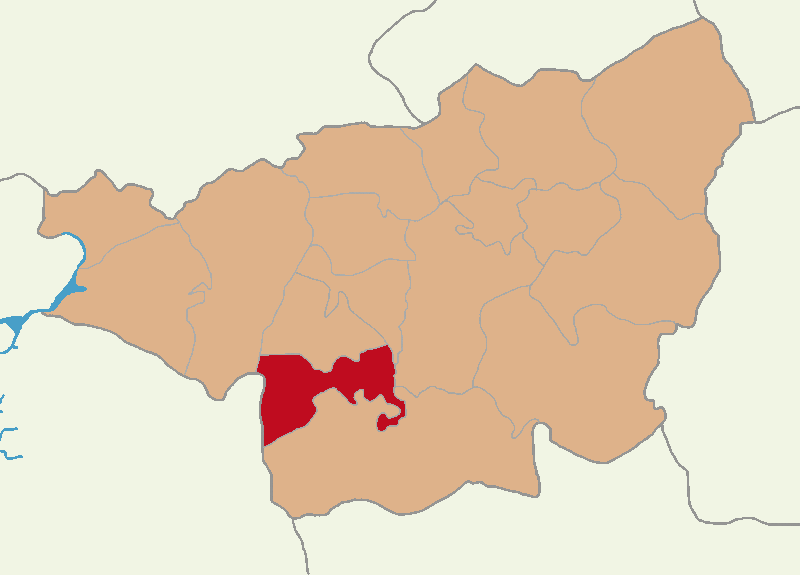
- Map showing Bağlar District in Diyarbakır Province

- Location within Turkey
- Coordinates: 37°55′N 40°11′E
- Country: Turkey
- Province: Diyarbakır
- Area: 429 km^{2} (166 sq mi)
- Population (2022): 406,471
  - Density: 947/km^{2} (2,450/sq mi)
- Time zone: UTC+3 (TRT)
- Postal code: 21020
- Area code: 0412
- Website: www.baglar.bel.tr

Bağlar is a municipality and district of Diyarbakır Province, Turkey. Its area is 429 km^{2}, and its population is 406,471 (2022). It covers the southwestern part of the city of Diyarbakır and the adjacent countryside. The district Bağlar was created in 2008 from part of the central district (Merkez) of Diyarbakır.

In the local elections of March 2019, Zeyyat Ceylan was elected as a Mayor with 70,34% of the votes. But on 11 April the Supreme Election Board decided not to deliver him the right to serve as Mayor due to having been dismissed from public office before. The Mayorship was instead delivered to Hüseyin Beyoğlu from the Justice and Development Party (AKP) who polled second with 25,46%.

== Population ==
Historical population
Year	Pop.	±% p.a.
2008	334,954	—
2012	356,243	+1.55%
2017	386,578	+1.65%
2022	406,471	+1.01%
Source: TÜIK (2008-2022)

== Composition ==
There are 49 neighbourhoods in Bağlar District:

- 5 Nisan
- Ağaçgeçit
- Alankoz
- Alipınar
- Bağcılar
- Batıçanakçı
- Batıkarakoç
- Buçuktepe
- Buyuransu
- Çiçekliyurt
- Çiftlik
- Develi
- Ekince
- Fatih
- Gömmetaş
- Kabahıdır
- Kamışpınar
- Karacadağ
- Karahanköy
- Karamus
- Kaynartepe
- Kırkıncık
- Kırkkoyun
- Kolludere
- Körhat
- Körtepe
- Mevlana Halit
- Muradiye
- Oğlaklı
- Ortaören
- Övündüler
- Özdemir
- Pınaroğlu
- Sakallı
- Sarıdallı
- Selahattini Eyyubi
- Şeyh Şamil
- Tavşantepe
- Tellikaya
- Tokluca
- Topraktaş
- Topyolu
- Uzunbahçe
- Yeniköy
- Yeşildallı
- Yiğityolu
- Yukarıakdibek
- Yukarımollaali
- Yunus Emre
