= 2025 PKK–Turkey peace process =

Process for resolution of the Kurdistan Workers' Party insurgency

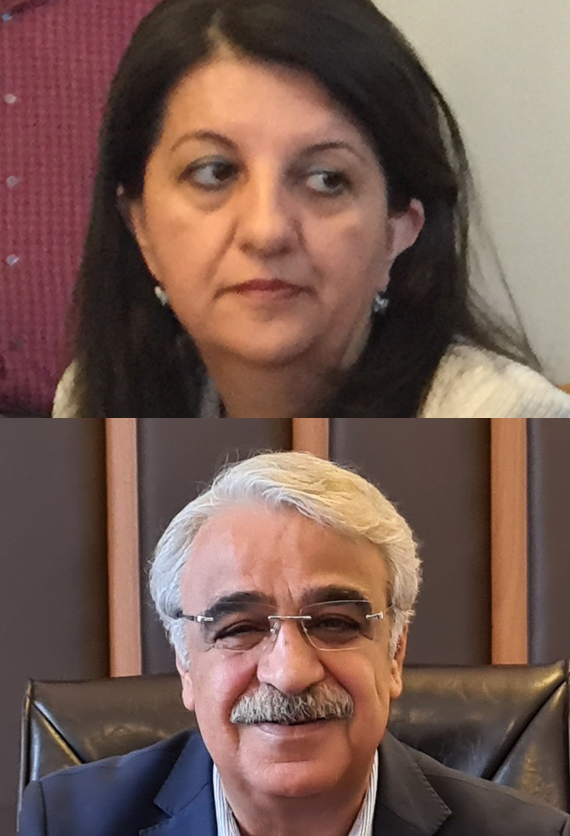
Pervin Buldan and Mithat Sancar

The 2025 PKK–Turkey peace process, also known as the Second Peace Process or the Second Solution Process, refers to the process in 2025 for resolution of the Kurdistan Workers' Party insurgency. The process was seen as the successor of the failed 2013–2015 PKK–Turkey peace process.

== Background ==
The first process was carried out between 2013 and 2015. Following the loss of the AKP's majority in the June 2015 Turkish general election and the Ceylanpınar incident, the conflict started again. After this process, various political actors adopted different approaches to the Kurdish issue, but an official negotiation process was discarded. By 2024, amid regional shifts, a change in Turkey's domestic and foreign policy, the Gaza war, as well as the increase of power of Kurdish autonomous areas in Iraq and Syria began debates on a possible new solution process.

== History ==
On October 22, 2024, Devlet Bahçeli, leader of the Nationalist Movement Party (MHP), in a surprising change in tone, invited Abdullah Öcalan to speak in the Turkish parliament and dissolve the Kurdistan Workers' Party (PKK). On November 26, Bahçeli renewed his invitation.

The Peoples' Equality and Democracy Party (DEM Party) applied to meet Öcalan in İmralı prison, which happened on December 28. On January 22, they visited a second time. On February 27, the DEM Party delegation visited Öcalan for a third time. Later on February 27, 2025, Öcalan ordered the PKK to convene a congress, disarm, and dissolve. On March 1, the PKK declared a unilateral ceasefire. The PKK also claimed that it would obey Öcalan's order and work on implementing it. On April 10, the DEM Party delegation met with Turkish President Recep Tayyip Erdoğan. The meeting between the DEM Party delegation and Turkish Justice Minister Yılmaz Tunç, planned for April 18, was postponed to a later date due to the heart condition of the DEM Party İmralı delegation and Istanbul Deputy Sırrı Süreyya Önder. On May 3, Sırrı Süreyya Önder died in the hospital.

=== Congress and dissolution ===
The PKK held its 12th congress between May 5 and 7 in both Suleymaniyah and Duhok, Iraq, and was attended by 232 delegates. According to a declaration the congress "discussed issues of Leadership, Martyrs, Veterans, the PKK's Organisational Existence and Armed Struggle Method, and the Construction of a Democratic Society, taking historic decisions that signify the beginning of a new era for our Freedom Movement." and announced four decisions; the end of the political and military conflict of the PKK against Turkey and the transition to a political and legal struggle; the stoppage of all PKK activities with the dissolution of the PKK, the stoppage of all military and political work of the PKK in Iraq, Iran, Syria, and Turkey, and the responsibility of the PKK Presidential Council for the fulfillment of the dissolution along with the formation of a joint committee for the delivery of weapons. The Kurdish issue has come “to a point where it can be resolved through democratic politics,” the PKK said in a statement. Turkey had discussed agreements with Öcalan, who participated in the congress by call. The result of the congress was sent to Öcalan for approval. Although Turkey guaranteed the security of the congress, in a statement from the congress it was stated that the situation on the ground was 'challenging', with no cessation in 'air and ground attacks' among other issues.

"The Congress was held securely despite the challenging conditions where conflicts continued, air and ground attacks persisted, and the siege on our areas and the KDP embargo were ongoing.

The conference was dedicated to Ali Haydar Kaytan and Ali Rıza Altun whos deaths were confirmed by the congress.

== See also ==
- 1991–2004 Kurdish–Turkish peace initiatives
- 2013–2015 PKK–Turkey peace process
- 2015 Ceylanpınar incident
