= Operation Martyr Yalçın =

2015 Turkish anti-ISIL and anti-PKK operation

- Part of the Turkey–ISIL conflict and the Kurdish–Turkish conflict
| Date | 24–25 July 2015 |
| Location | Syria–Turkey border, northern Iraq |
| Status | First wave against PKK and ISIL targets began on 24 July 2015 |

Belligerents
| Turkey: Turkish Air Force | Islamic State of Iraq and the Levant: Military of ISIL; Dokumacılar | Kurdistan Workers' Party: KCK; Revolutionary People's Liberation Party–Front |

Commanders and leaders
| (Turkey) Recep Tayyip Erdoğan (Turkey) Ahmet Davutoğlu (Turkey) Hulusi Akar | (Islamic State) Abu Bakr al-Baghdadi (Islamic State) Abu Ala al-Afri | Murat Karayılan; Cemil Bayık; Hüseyin Fevzi Tekin |

Strength
| Unknown | Unknown | 4,000 |

Casualties and losses
| Two police officers injured in Hakkari. Two soldiers killed and four wounded in Diyarbakir | 11–35 killed | 160 killed (Turkish claim) |

Operation Martyr Yalçın (Turkish: Şehit Yalçın Operasyonu) was a military operation conducted by the Turkish Air Force against Islamic State of Iraq and the Levant (ISIL) positions in Syria, and Kurdistan Workers' Party (PKK) positions in northern Iraq, on 24 and 25 July 2015.

The operation began in the early hours of 24 July, a day after ISIL militants reportedly attacked a Turkish military border outpost in the Turkish town of Elbeyli in Kilis Province, killing one soldier, Yalçın Nane, and injuring two others. The operation is named after the dead soldier.

The operation involved three waves of airstrikes against ISIL positions in Syria and two waves of airstrikes against PKK positions in Iraqi Kurdistan. Airstrikes were launched by F-16 fighter jets taking off from Diyarbakır and İncirlik Air Base on 24 July and 25 July. It was reported that 35 ISIL militants had been killed in the first wave after footage from the fighter jets and unmanned aircraft were analysed, while the airstrikes in Northern Iraq were confirmed to have killed a high-ranking PKK militant and were alleged to have killed the PKK commander Murat Karayılan. After 25 July, Turkey stopped its airstrikes on ISIL but continued with those against the PKK.

The airstrikes against the PKK resulted in an increase in violence in Turkish Kurdistan. In conjunction with the airstrikes, large-scale domestic operations were conducted by the General Directorate of Security and Gendarmerie in over 22 Turkish provinces. The airstrikes have been referred to as a 'major policy shift' and a 'game changer' in the global military intervention against ISIL.

== Background ==
=== Kurdistan Workers' Party (PKK) ===
The conflict between the Turkish government and Kurdish separatists has been ongoing for over 40 years, with a ceasefire in late 2012 marking the beginning of a 'solution process' between the government and the Kurdistan Workers' Party (PKK) militant organisation. As of early July 2015, the ceasefire and negotiations have continued despite numerous minor infringements and violations on both sides.

Following the 2015 Suruç bombing, which targeted members of a group sympathetic to the Kurdish movement, militants of disputed affiliation killed two policemen in the town of Ceylanpınar, Şanlıurfa Province, in an act of retaliation against suspected collaboration between Turkey and ISIL. PKK militants also attacked a military base in Adıyaman, killing another soldier. Much of the airstrikes have been successful in hitting PKK populated areas, however many civilians have been killed as a result of the strikes. On 10 August 2015, a Turkish Air Force airstrike occurred near a U.S. Special Forces training site made for the purpose of training Kurdish Peshmerga fighters combating ISIL.

=== Islamic State of Iraq and the Levant (ISIL) ===
Before the operation, the Turkish government had pursued an internationally criticised policy of inaction against ISIL, opting out of the anti-ISIL coalition and refusing to allow the United States to use the strategic İncirlik Air Base for airstrikes against ISIL unless they also targeted the forces of Bashar al-Assad. The Turkish policy of inaction contributed to the breakout of deadly riots in Northern Kurdistan, in protest against the government's refusal to intervene in ISIL's siege of Kobanî. Turkey's policy of inaction was also thought to be a contributing factor to Turkey's failure to win a seat in the United Nations Security Council in the 2014 Security Council election. Kurds and the Turkish opposition have also accused the government of actively supporting ISIL.

On 20 July 2015, a bombing in the Turkish district of Suruç, allegedly perpetrated by the ISIL-linked Dokumacılar group, killed 32 young activists and injured over 100. On 23 July, ISIL militants attacked Turkish military positions, killing one soldier and injuring two others. This was largely seen as a casus belli, which resulted in Turkish Prime Minister Ahmet Davutoğlu taking the decision to begin active air operations against PKK and ISIL positions south of Turkey's border.

== Motivation ==
The Turkish government claimed the operation was an effort to pre-empt a planned attack on Turkey and by saying: "The state of the Republic of Turkey is decisive in taking any precaution to safeguard its national security".

== Chronology ==
=== 24 July, morning ===
At 03:12 on 24 July, four F-16 fighter jets took off from Diyarbakır's 8th main airbase command, targeting ISIL. The operation was named after the soldier reportedly killed in an ISIL attack on 23 July on Turkish soldiers, Yalçın Nane. The jets used guided missiles to bomb two ISIL headquarters and one ISIL gathering point in Syria, near village Havar. Prime Minister Ahmet Davutoğlu claimed 100% accuracy. The jets bombed the sites without entering Syrian airspace, and the Syrian government was informed of the attack, according to Turkish officials. The operation took 1 hour and 12 minutes. It was reported that 35 ISIL militants had been killed during the operation. According to the SOHR, Turkish Armed Forces killed 11 IS fighters.

=== 24 July, evening ===
On the evening of 24 July, over 20 fighter jets took off from Diyarbakır at around 22:30 local time, targeting both Kurdistan Workers' Party (PKK) targets in northern Iraq and ISIL targets in Syria. The airstrikes on Kurdish targets were heavily criticised by the PKK, which accused the government of ending the Solution process.

Three ISIL targets were reported to have been struck.

==== Attack on Diyarbakır F-16s ====
At around 8pm local time on 24 July, attackers of unknown origin fired on F-16 fighter jets in Diyarbakır's main Air Base while they were taking off. As a result, police officers and soldiers secured the area while the jets continued to conduct their operation. The jets returned to their hangars after they returned. The perpetrators could not be identified.

==== Other Turkish shelling ====
On 24 July, Turkish tanks reportedly bombarded a village west of Kobani, targeting Kurdish People's Protection Units (YPG), resulting in four YPG fighters being injured.

=== 25 July ===
On 25 July, Prime Minister Ahmet Davutoğlu announced that he had given the order to carry out a third wave air operation against ISIL targets, alongside a second wave in Iraq against the PKK. Davutoğlu called the airstrikes a part of a broad 'process' and gave support to the main opposition Republican People's Party's call for an extraordinary convention of the Grand National Assembly, which was in recess.

The third wave (= the 25 July wave) began at around 10:20 local time on 25 July, with 70 F-16 fighter jets taking off from Diyarbakır to strike both PKK targets in Northern Iraq and ISIL targets in Syria. The jets attacking ISIL positions were reported to have violated Syrian airspace this time, bringing identified ISIL targets under heavy bombardment. Activity was also reported at İncirlik Air Base, while unmanned drones taking off from Batman Air Base assessed the damage to PKK targets.

==== PKK targets ====
The operations were heavily directed towards the PKK camps in Northern Iraq, targeting over 400 positions. The ‘third wave’ itself was conducted in three different waves, with close to 70 fighter jets taking part in the first two and 25 taking part in the third. The targets encompassed over 300 kilometres, with many of the targets being identified as the PKK's main training and storage camps. The PKK reported that a senior official of the PKK had been killed while three other militants had been injured. It was also alleged that the PKK's commander Murat Karayılan was killed during the airstrikes.

== Reactions ==
- European Union – EU Commissioner for foreign affairs, Federica Mogherini, stated that the EU supported the airstrikes against ISIL and offered condolences for those killed in recent terror attacks, while stressing the need to preserve the solution process with Kurdish rebels.
- Germany – German Defence Minister Ursula von der Leyen stated that the German government saluted Turkey's change of policy and airstrikes against ISIL. German Chancellor Angela Merkel also expressed her support for Turkey's operations against terrorism, but stressed that the solution process with Kurdish rebels should be maintained.
- United Kingdom – UK Prime Minister David Cameron expressed his support for Turkey's fight against terrorism during a phone call with Turkish Prime Minister Ahmet Davutoğlu on 24 July.
- United States – The US Deputy Special Presidential Envoy to the Global Coalition to Counter ISIL, Brett H. McGurk, stated that the US respect Turkey's right to self-defence against attacks from the PKK and condemned the PKK's attacks.

== See also ==
- Syrian Civil War
- Ceylanpınar incidents
