= Opinion polling for the November 2015 Turkish general election =

In the leadup to the November 2015 general election, various organisations carried out opinion polling to gauge voting intention. Results of such polls are displayed in this article. These polls only include Turkish voters nationwide and do not take into account Turkish expatriates voting abroad.

The results tend to vary widely (see opinion polls in Turkey for further information). Opposition parties tend to regard such polls as unreliable and have presented legislation to Parliament tightening restrictions on how opinion polls conduct their research. After the previous election in June 2015, the polling company ORC issued a written statement apologising for the inaccuracies in their pre-election polls. KONDA, another polling company, made an apology for similar reasons after their predictions varied widely with the actual result after the 2014 presidential election.

== Polling accuracy ==
The following table shows the most accurate polling companies based on the last opinion polls conducted by each company before the June 2015 vote (held on 7 June 2015), taking into account the domestic-only vote shares won in the election.

Party	Actual vote 7 June 2015	Most accurate pollster			
Party	Actual vote 7 June 2015	Pollster	Poll date	Predicted vote	Error margin
AKP	40.7	ANAR	27 May	40.5	▼0.2
CHP	25.1	MAK	18–26 May	24.9	▼0.2
CHP	25.1	ORC	30 May – 1 June	25.3	▲0.2
MHP	16.5	Gezici	2 June	16.5	0.0
HDP	13.0	Konda	30–31 May	12.6	▼0.4
Overall most accurate		ANAR	27 May	–	▲0.9

== Controversies ==
According to media reports, Turkey's Justice and Development Party (AKP) government has attempted to suppress polling companies who publish polls predicting that the AKP will lose seats in the election.

Gezici Research and Polling Company have had some of their pollsters arrested in February and September 2015, after predicting that the AKP will lose power in the next election.

== Vote share polling ==
=== Graphical summary ===
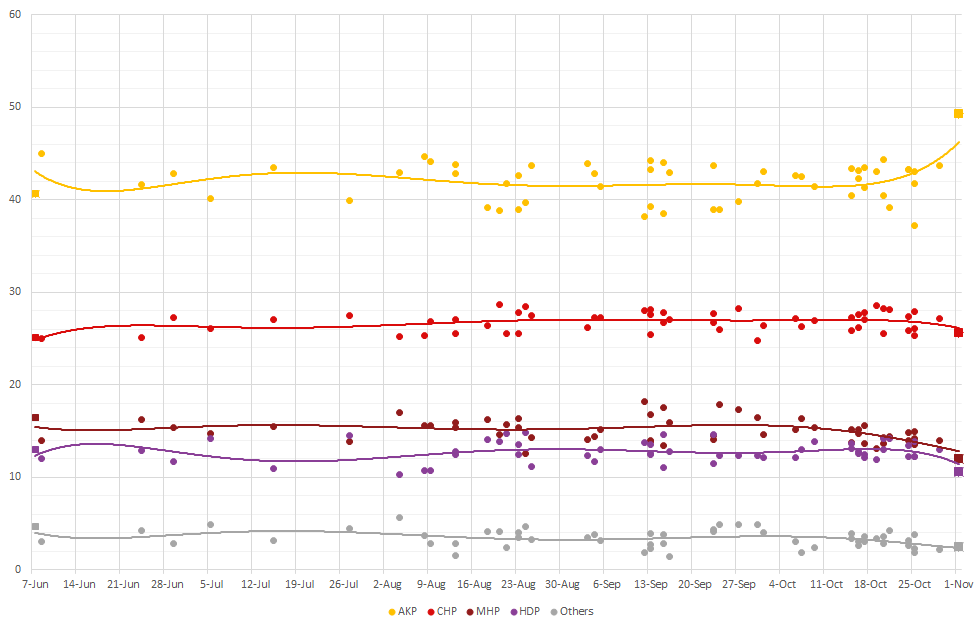
Opinion polling since the June general election

=== Poll results ===
Date	Pollster	Sample	AKP	CHP	MHP	HDP	Others	Lead
1 Nov	Election results Domestic vote only	46,555,267	49.3	25.6	12.0	10.6	2.5	23.7
24–29 Oct	Andy-Ar	2,400	43.7	27.1	14.0	13.0	2.2	16.6
24–25 Oct	Konda	3,574	41.7	27.9	14.2	13.8	2.3	13.8
24–25 Oct	A&G	4,536	47.2	25.3	13.5	12.2	1.8	21.9
24–25 Oct	Gezici	4,864	43.0	26.1	14.9	12.2	3.8	16.9
22–24 Oct	Metropoll	2,576	43.3	25.9	14.8	13.4	2.6	17.4
21–24 Oct	ORC	2,650	43.3	27.4	14.0	12.2	3.1	15.9
22 Oct	The first of a series of pre-election restrictions come into force, banning the publication of opinion polls							
17–21 Oct	Kurd-Tek	2,592	39.1	28.1	14.4	14.2	4.2	11.0
16–20 Oct	AKAM	24,540	40.5	28.2	14.3	14.2	2.8	12.3
16–20 Oct	Betimar	2,000	44.3	25.5	13.6	13.0	3.6	18.8
13–19 Oct	Konsensus	2,002	43.0	28.6	13.1	11.9	3.4	14.4
17–18 Oct	Konda	?	41.5	28.0	14.7	12.7	3.1	
12–17 Oct	Gezici	4,864	41.3	27.0	15.6	12.5	3.6	14.3
12–17 Oct	MAK	–	43.5	27.8	13.6	12.1	3.0	15.7
12–16 Oct	Argetus	4,472	43.1	26.2	15.1	12.6	3.0	16.9
10–16 Oct	Perspektif	1,255	42.3	27.6	14.7	12.8	2.6	14.7
10–15 Oct	Denge	–	43.4	25.9	13.7	13.6	3.4	17.5
8–15 Oct	Sonar	3,000	40.5	27.3	15.2	13.1	3.9	13.2
10 Oct	Twin bombings target a peace rally in Ankara							
5–9 Oct	Samer	4,144	41.4	26.9	15.4	13.9	2.4	14.5
4–7 Oct	MetroPoll	2,526	42.5	26.3	16.3	13.0	1.9	16.2
3–6 Oct	Andy-Ar	1,764	42.6	27.1	15.2	12.1	3.0	15.5
3–4 Oct	Konda	?	41.0	29.2	14.8	12.2	2.8	
3–4 Oct	Gezici	4,860	40.8	27.6	15.8	13.6	2.2	13.2
28 Sep – 1 Oct	TÜSİAR	3,041	43.0	26.4	14.6	12.1	4.0	16.6
26–27 Sep	Gezici	4,860	39.8	28.2	17.3	12.3	2.4	11.6
17–24 Sep	LRC	2,425	38.9	26.0	17.9	12.3	4.9	12.9
23 Sep	AKAM	1,214	38.9	27.7	14.5	14.6	4.3	11.2
19–23 Sep	MAK	5,500	43.7	26.7	14.1	11.5	4.1	17.0
22 Sep	The two HDP ministers in the interim election government resign and are replaced by independents							
19–21 Sep	Ada	3,000	44.7	27.6	12.9	11.8	3.0	17.1
18 Sep	Deputy Prime Minister and MHP Ankara MP Tuğrul Türkeş defects to the AKP							
12–15 Sep	ORC	2,760	44.0	27.8	13.4	11.0	3.8	16.2
2–15 Sep	KURD-TEK	5,348	38.5	26.7	17.5	14.6	2.8	11.8
12–13 Sep	Gezici	5,000	39.3	28.1	16.8	13.5	2.3	11.2
5–13 Sep	Konsensus	1,500	43.3	27.6	13.8	12.6	2.7	15.7
27 Aug – 13 Sep	ANAR-Denge-GENAR-Pollmark	157,907	44.2	25.4	14.0	12.5	3.9	18.8
12 Sep	Ahmet Davutoğlu is re-elected as AKP leader unopposed during the party's 5th Ordinary Congress							
5–12 Sep	Sonar	2,500	38.2	28.0	18.2	13.7	1.9	10.2
5–6 Sep	Konda	?	41.7	24.8	16.4	12.3	4.8	
2–5 Sep	MetroPoll	2,540	41.4	27.3	15.3	13.0	3.2	14.1
3 Sep	Varyans	15,000	43.9	26.2	14.1	12.3	3.5	17.7
2 Sep	KamuAR	5,249	42.3	26.0	18.7	11.9	1.2	16.3
28 Aug	Prime Minister Ahmet Davutoğlu forms Turkey's first ever interim election government							
22–25 Aug	ORC	2,450	43.7	27.5	14.3	11.2	3.3	16.2
24 Aug	President Recep Tayyip Erdoğan calls a snap general election scheduled for 1 November 2015							
24 Aug	AKAM	1,624	39.7	28.5	12.6	14.8	4.7	11.2
22–23 Aug	Gezici	4,860	38.9	27.8	16.3	13.5	3.5	11.1
19–23 Aug	Argetus	2,960	42.6	25.5	15.4	12.5	4.0	17.1
21 Aug	MetroPoll	2,520	41.7	25.5	15.7	14.7	2.4	16.2
20 Aug	CHP	–	38.8	28.7	14.6	13.8	4.1	10.1
18 Aug	AKP leader and Prime Minister Ahmet Davutoğlu returns the mandate to form a government to the President after last-ditch coalition talks with the MHP break down							
18 Aug	Gezici	–	39.2	26.4	16.2	14.1	4.1	12.8
13 Aug	Coalition talks between the AKP and the CHP break down							
13 Aug	AKP	–	43.8	25.5	15.4	12.5	2.8	18.3
8–11 Aug	Andy-Ar	1,504	42.8	27.0	15.9	12.8	1.5	15.8
8–9 Aug	Konda	?	43.6	25.5	14.7	12.8	3.4	
7–9 Aug	ORC	1,580	44.1	26.8	15.6	10.7	2.8	17.3
4–8 Aug	MAK	5,500	44.7	25.3	15.6	10.7	3.7	19.4
24 Jul – 4 Aug	SONAR	3,500	42.9	25.2	17.0	10.3	5.6	17.2
27 Jul	AKAM	1,412	39.9	27.5	13.8	14.5	4.4	12.4
21 Jul	İstanbul MP İhsan Özkes resigns from the CHP							
20 Jul	A suicide bombing in Suruç kills 32 people and results in military operations against the Kurdistan Workers' Party (PKK) and the Islamic State of Iraq and the Levant (ISIL)							
11–15 Jul	ORC	3,200	43.5	27.0	15.5	10.9	3.1	16.5
4–5 Jul	Gezici	4,860	40.1	26.1	14.7	14.2	4.9	14.0
29 Jun	Andy-Ar	1,556	42.8	27.3	15.4	11.7	2.8	15.5
24 Jun	MetroPoll	2,483	41.6	25.1	16.2	12.9	4.2	16.5
8 Jun	IPSOS	1,750	45.0	25.0	14.0	12.0	3.0	20.0
7 Jun	June 2015 general election Domestic vote only	45,121,773	40.7	25.1	16.5	13.0	4.7	15.6
12 Jun 2011	June 2011 general election Domestic vote only	42,813,896	49.8	26.0	13.0	–	11.2	23.8

== Seat predictions ==
Date	Pollster	Sample	AKP	CHP	MHP	HDP	Majority
22–24 Oct	MetroPoll	2,576	269 / 550	134 / 550	67 / 550	80 / 550	Hung
17–21 Oct	Kurd-Tek	2,592	251 / 550	149 / 550	66 / 550	84 / 550	Hung
16–20 Oct	AKAM	24,540	254 / 550	140 / 550	69 / 550	87 / 550	Hung
16–20 Oct	Betimar	2,000	278 / 550	132 / 550	61 / 550	79 / 550	6
17–18 Oct	Gezici	4,864	262 / 550	137 / 550	74 / 550	77 / 550	Hung
3–4 Oct	Gezici	4,860	256 / 550	141 / 550	73 / 550	80 / 550	Hung
26–27 Sep	Gezici	4,860	246 / 550	140 / 550	87 / 550	77 / 550	Hung
23 Sep	AKAM	1,214	243 / 550	149 / 550	72 / 550	86 / 550	Hung
27 Aug – 13 Sep	ANAR-Denge-GENAR-Pollmark	157,907	276 / 550	129 / 550	65 / 550	80 / 550	2
24 Aug	AKAM	1,624	250 / 550	144 / 550	68 / 550	88 / 550	Hung
22–23 Aug	Gezici	4,860	240 / 550	142 / 550	85 / 550	83 / 550	Hung
21 Aug	MetroPoll	2,520	259 / 550	133 / 550	74 / 550	84 / 550	Hung
20 Aug	CHP	–	238 / 550	149 / 550	76 / 550	86 / 550	Hung
27 Jul	AKAM	1,412	254 / 550	147 / 550	63 / 550	86 / 550	Hung
7 Jun	June 2015 general election	–	258 / 550	132 / 550	80 / 550	80 / 550	Hung
12 Jun 2011	June 2011 general election	–	327 / 550	135 / 550	53 / 550	35 / 550	104

== See also ==
- Opinion polling for the Turkish general election, June 2015
