= 2015 police raids in Turkey =

- Part of the Turkey–ISIL conflict, Kurdish–Turkish conflict and the DHKP/C insurgency in Turkey
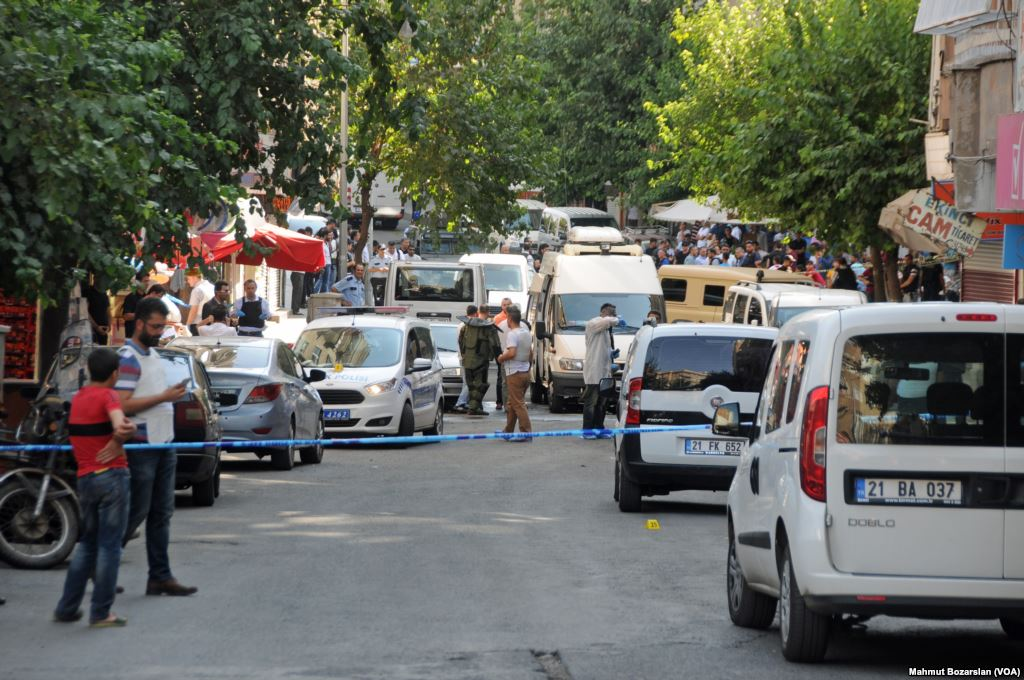
- Police officers conducting a raid on terrorist suspects on 24 July 2015
- Type: Police raids
- Location: Over 64 Provinces of Turkey
- Planned by: Ahmet Davutoğlu (as Prime Minister of Turkey); Sebahattin Öztürk (as Minister of the Interior)
- Commanded by: (Turkey) Turkish government
- Target: Islamic State; Kurdistan Workers' Party; DHKP/C
- Objective: counter-terrorism
- Date: 24 July 2015; 3:00 (EEST)
- Executed by: General Directorate of Security KDGM
- Outcome: 3,768 suspected terrorists detained 981 terrorists arrested
- Casualties: 1 suspect killed during a police raid in Istanbul

The 2015 police raids in Turkey (24 July 2015) were a series of police raids conducted by the General Directorate of Security in 16 different Provinces of Turkey. The July 20th, 2015 Suruç bombing in Suruç killed 32 Kurds. Claimed by ISIS, it was perceived by Kurdish militants as a collaboration between ISIS and Turkey security services, leading to a series of revenge attacks on Turkish policemen and military positions in Adıyaman and Ceylanpınar. The Ceylanpınar incidents saw the assassination of 2 policemen by operatives of disputed affiliation, attributed to the Kurdistan Workers' Party (PKK), and became the Casus belli for Turkish operations against the PKK in both Turkey and Iraq.

The operations began at around 3 am local time, after Turkish soldiers and Islamic State (ISIS) militants engaged in a conflict in the town of Kilis near the Syria–Turkey border. The Turkish government, under significant political pressure to respond to the terrorist attacks by ISIS, subsequently began the police operations against suspects from ISIS, the PKK and also the far-left militant Revolutionary People's Liberation Party–Front (DKHP/C). By midday on 25 July 2015, Prime Minister Ahmet Davutoğlu stated that 590 suspects had been arrested.

== Background ==
=== Islamic State of Iraq and the Levant ===
Turkey had maintained a policy of inaction against the Islamic State (ISIS) despite international calls to do more to combat the terrorist group. Turkish soldiers and ISIS militants have been involved in unexpected clashes in the past and ISIS has also been linked to the 2013 Reyhanlı bombings, the 2015 Istanbul suicide bombing and the 2015 Diyarbakır rally bombing. On 20 July 2015, 32 socialist activists planning to cross the border to help with relief efforts in the Syrian town of Kobanî were killed in a suicide bombing in Suruç, Şanlıurfa Province. The perpetrator was identified as a member of the Dokumacılar, a terrorist group linked to ISIS. On 23 July, ISIS militants and Turkish soldiers clashed near the Turkish border town of Elbeyli, with the Turkish Air Force subsequently beginning an airstrike against ISIS positions across the border.

=== Kurdish separatists ===
Since 2013, a largely successful solution process between the Turkish government and the Kurdistan Workers' Party (PKK) had been in place, resulting in a ceasefire between the two sides after 40 years of Kurdish separatist conflict. Although the ceasefire was often violated, such violations were regarded as relatively low key and negotiations continued through to 2015. Following the bombing in Suruç, where ISIS killed more than 20 pro-Kurdish supporters, the PKK then allegedly attacked Turkish soldiers in Adıyaman on 20 July, killing one non-commissioned officer and injuring two other soldiers. On 22 July 2015, two police officers in the Ceylanpınar district of Şanlıurfa Province were killed, with the PKK allegedly taking responsibility and claiming that the attack was in revenge for the Suruç bombing where they claimed that Turkish government is cooperating with ISIS. On 23 July, pro-government media claimed that PKK gunmen called local police, falsely reporting a traffic accident, and opened fired on the two traffic police officers, killing one and seriously injuring the other. On 24 July, PKK kidnapped one police officer in Diyarbakır and injured two in Hakkari

== Counter-terrorism raids ==
=== 23 July Security meeting ===
In response to recent developments, Prime Minister Ahmet Davutoğlu assembled a Security meeting in the Çankaya mansion on 23 July. The meeting was attended by Deputy Prime Ministers Bülent Arınç and Yalçın Akdoğan, Interior Minister Sebahattin Öztürk, National Defence Minister Vecdi Gönül, the military Chief of Staff Necdet Özel, the Deputy Chief of Staff Yaşar Güler, Army chief Hulusi Akar, the Gendarmerie General Commander Abdullah Atay, the General Director of Security Celalettin Lekesiz, the Undersecretary of the National Intelligence Organisation Hakan Fidan and numerous other high-ranking civil servants from various government departments. The decision taken after the meeting was to conduct police operations on suspected terrorists and to pursue airstrikes against ISIL on the Turkish-Syrian border.

=== Conduct ===
The operations began in the early hours of 24 July 2015, with Davutoğlu claiming that they were directed at ISIL, PKK, DKHP/C and other militant left-wing organisations that threatened public order in Turkey. Raids were conducted in 13 Provinces in Turkey, rising to 16 by midday. Over 10,000 police officers were involved in what was branded as a 'giant operation against terror', with 5,000 of these officers deployed in Istanbul alone. 26 different districts of Istanbul were involved in the raids.

== Arrests ==
In a press statement at around 14:00 local time on 24 July, Davutoğlu claimed that 297 suspects had been arrested. 37 arrests had been made in Ceylanpınar in relation to the killing of two police officers in the district by the PKK, while 19 other arrests in relation to the deaths were made in Diyarbakır. 37 of those arrested were foreign, while 103 of the 297 arrests had been made in Istanbul alone, with large numbers of firearms also being impounded upon during the police raids.

On 25 July, Davutoğlu stated that 590 suspects had been arrested in the 2 days.

=== Istanbul ===
Counter-terrorism forces, consisting of over 2,000 riot police and 3,000 other officers, conducted raids in 26 different districts in Istanbul Province, backed up by air forces. While police officers were preparing to raid a compound in the district of Bağcılar, the inhabitants opened fire on the officers, with a short subsequent exchange of fire taking place. One terrorist was killed in the exchange and was identified to be Günay Özarslan, a female DHKP/C militant who had been wanted on charges of preparing for a suicide bombing. The firearms used in the attack were impounded by the officers. Overall, 6 firearms and numerous documents had been impounded in raids across Istanbul.

On 25 July, operations conducted with the aid of police helicopters resulted in several arrests in the district of Beyoğlu.

=== Ankara ===
Counter-terrorism raids were conducted in 12 different sites across Ankara, leading to a total of 14 arrests. 5 of the arrests were associated with the Kurdistan Workers' Party (PKK), while the remaining 9 were associated with the Islamic State of Iraq and the Levant. 2 PKK youth members were arrested in the Yenimahalle district on 25 July. Among those arrested was the alleged head of the Ankara branch of PKK.

=== İzmir ===
In response to a warning made in the district of Menemen, two individuals under the age of 18 were placed under surveillance. In the ensuring operation, the two individuals were arrested along with molotov cocktails and drums full of petrol. It was alleged that the two suspects were planning to start a forest fire on behalf of a terrorist organisation. In another operation in central İzmir, four suspects were taken into custody for participating in illegal demonstrations on behalf of a terrorist organisation. On 25 July, numerous documents and evidence was confiscated during operations against the YGD/H.

=== Şanlıurfa ===
In Şanlıurfa Province, where the bombings in the district of Suruç by ISIL resulted in the death of 32 youth activists, 49 different addresses linked to the PKK were raided, with a total of 35 arrests being made. It was later claimed separately by Davutoğlu that 39 PKK suspects had been arrested in Ceylanpınar alone for alleged links to the killing of two police officers in the district on 22 July. On 25 July, police officers in Ceylanpınar, Suruç and Birecik arrested 20 suspects who were allegedly members of the PKK.

=== Bursa ===
In Bursa, operations conducted on suspected members of the PKK's youth establishment YDG-H (Patriotic Revolutionary Youth Movement) resulted in the arrests of 9 suspects. Police in Bursa also began investigations into individuals who had participated previously in violent rioting and forcing children to take part in such rioting as well. The arrests were made in Bursa's Yıldırım district. 7 more suspects were arrested on 25 July.

=== Iğdır ===
The Iğdır Provincial Directorate of Security began operations in the early hours of 24 July at different addresses, with 9 suspects being arrested on charges of spreading propaganda for the PKK. Peoples' Democratic Party (HDP) Member of Parliament for Iğdır, Mehmet Emin, stated that the co-chair of the Democratic Regions Party (DBP) Iğdır branch, Zübeyde Kaynar, the co-chair of the HDP Iğdır branch Dilber Turan and former DBP Mayor of Iğdır Hüseyin Malk were among those arrested. Former Peace and Democracy Party (BDP) councillor Oğuz Ok was also among those arrested.

=== Antalya ===
In Antalya, two suspects thought to be members of the PKK were arrested. Since one of the suspects was under the age of 18, the suspect was required to give their witness statement to the Children's Department of the Directorate of Security.

=== Elazığ ===
In operations taking place in Elazığ, five suspects who were allegedly part of the PKK's youth organisation were arrested. The police officers taking party in the operations also confiscated two unlicensed firearms and numerous organisation-related documents.

=== Bitlis ===
In Bitlis, operations conducted against the youth organisations of the PKK and the Group of Communities in Kurdistan (KCK), namely the Patriotic Revolutionary Youth Movement (YDG/H), resulted in the arrests of 8 people.

=== Adana ===
The Adana Directorate of Security designed an operation in the neighbourhood of Gülbahçesi in the district of Seyhan, in which 22 suspects thought to be members of the Patriotic Revolutionary Youth Movement (YDG/H) were arrested. The Provincial Gendarmerie also arrested 10 suspects in the Yakapınar neighbourhood, located in the metropolitan district of Yüreğir. 3 other suspects were arrested in the Dağlıoğlu neighbourhood. The number of arrests rose to 54 on 25 July.

=== Mersin ===
In Mersin, the Directorate of Security launched operations against suspected PKK members who had participated in unlicensed protests and had opened fire against security forces. 21 suspects were arrested, with 190 hunting rifles being filed. 10 bullets were also confiscated.

=== Şırnak ===
On 25 July, police officers in the Cizre district of Şırnak Province were met by fireworks, noise bombs and gunfire from YDG/H members while pursuing several operations in the district. Following a brief conflict between the police and YDG/H militants, 5 suspects were arrested. At the same time, the Gendarmerie arrested 5 other members thought to be part of the PKK.

=== Konya ===
On 25 July, police officers in Konya, around 300 officers participated in numerous operations against ISIL targets, detaining three and arresting 16 suspects. One suspect was thought to be a suicide bomber from ISIL and was identified as one of the three suicide bombers that had allegedly been sent to Turkey by ISIL to conduct terrorist attacks.

=== Bingöl ===
In Bingöl, 9 suspects who were thought to have links with the PKK were arrested. The Governor of Bingöl, Yavuz Selim Köşger claimed that 7 of those arrested had been caught in the central district of Bingöl, while the remaining two had been arrested in the provincial districts of Karlıova and Solhan.

== Reactions ==
The Peoples' Democratic Party issued a statement saying that it was "unacceptable to integrate a struggle against the Kurdish people into a struggle against ISIL" and that "military operations, bombings and political arrests must stop immediately." The party claimed that Turkey was being thrust into "a process with no clear end".

== See also ==
- Spillover of the Syrian Civil War
- Terrorism in Turkey
