= Ceylanpınar incident =

Assassination attempt in Turkey

Ceylanpınar incidents
- Part of Turkish involvement in the Syrian Civil War
- Location: Ceylanpınar, Turkey
- Date: 22 July 2015 (EEST)
- Target: Turkish off-duty police officers
- Attack type: Assassination
- Weapon: Silenced gun
- Deaths: 2
- Victims: Okan Acar, Feyyaz Yumuşak
- Perpetrator: Kurdistan Workers' Party (accused)
- Accused: 9 alleged PKK militants, acquitted

The Ceylanpınar incident (22–24 July 2015) saw the killing of two police officers in Ceylanpınar, Turkey, which led to the resumption of the Kurdish-Turkish conflict in one of the most important flare-ups of the decades long conflict. The attack was used by the Justice and Development Party (AKP) government as a casus belli to end the 2013–2015 solution process and resume its war against the Kurdistan Workers' Party (PKK). As the AKP had failed to win a majority in the June 2015 Turkish general election the month before, and soon after resuming armed hostilities announced the November 2015 Turkish snap general election, analysts believe that the Ceylanpınar killings and return to war have been used to increase Turkish nationalist and rally 'round the flag fervor to help the ruling party in taking back control over the Turkish parliament. Other motives have also been advanced, with the Syrian war encouraging extremist parties from both sides to undermine peace efforts by increasing nationalism and readiness for war.

== Background ==
Early AKP policies were reformist and appeasing. Discourse analysis of four major AKP leaders suggests AKP communication strategy was mostly to paint the opposition CHP as inapt to lead to peace while continuing to label Kurdish oppositions as threats and terrorists. In 2011, Kurdish independent candidates won 6.6% of the vote and 35 parliament seats while the 2013 Turkey's peace-process greatly reduced PKK activities in southeastern Turkey. Lower incomes and lower literacy have been observed for decades in Turkey's southeastern provinces, causing higher demographic dynamism and raising political weight for Kurds. Turkey military consolidation in Turkey South-Eastern region, early 2015 YPG success in the battle of Kobane leading to the establishment of the a successful Syrian Kurdistan (Rojava) slowly turned the AKP against the peace process. Erdogan statements denying needs for changes, the trio of official pro-Kurd leadership entities (Ocalan, HDP, KCK), the sudden and unannounced isolation of Ocalan, the numerous pre-election attacks on HDP headquarters before the elections (114 reported attacks) lead to deep distrust. The ceasefire was nevertheless largely successful, sharply reducing clashes and casualties thanks to the both government and the rebels efforts.

The 7th of June 2015 Turkish general election gave pro-Kurdish Peoples' Democratic Party (HDP) 13.1% (+6.5%) of the national votes while AKP gathered an historic low of 41% (-9% ) of votes. This electoral success has been called the "Kurdish miracle" and deprived the AKP of its majority previously maintained since 2002. Also:

Its [AKP] loss of its parliamentary majority on the June 7, 2015 elections due to the HDP’s unprecedented electoral success was a deal-breaker for the AKP, a party that was arguably never “really willing and ready to transform the ethno-national hierarchies that favor Turks”

On July 12th, the KCK declared an end to the ceasefire and the start of targeting material infrastructures. On July 17th, Erdogan denounced the Dolmabahçe Agreement. On July 20th, ISIS led the 2015 Suruç bombing, killed 32 Kurdish volunteers. PKK elements accused Turkey of supporting the Islamic State (ISIS) and being complicit in the bombing. It has also been argued that ISIS willfully wanted to put pressure on the Turkey-Kurdish peace process and succeeded in its aim to stir conflict between them.

== Incident ==
On 22 July 2015, two police officers were assassinated by unidentified men. The officers were killed as they slept in the home they shared in Ceylanpınar, a town on the border with Syria. Soon after, nine Turkish Kurds were anonymously denounced as the killers, arrested and accused of assassinations under PKK orders.

== Responsibility and command ==
Responsibility was first claimed by PKK's armed wing People's Defence Forces (HPG), describing it as a retaliation following the prior Suruç bombing. The claim suggested PKK-related killers.

The claim was soon countered by higher PKK authorities: a week after, the Kurdistan Communities Union (KCK) spokesman Demhat Agit said that the PKK was not officially involved, saying the attack had been led by "units independent from the PKK. They are local forces which organized themselves and not affiliated with us." According to journalist Frederike Geerdink :

"The KCK approves of it because they say, '32 people died - should we not act on that?' So local cells take their own initiatives, but its the KCK that decides the ceasefire is over [or maintained]."

== Executive reaction ==
On 24 July 2015, the government of Recep Tayyip Erdoğan simultaneously ordered Turkish Police large scale internal operations while the Turkish military began a large-scale military operation against the PKK and ISIS. As a result of attacks by the Turkish army, the PKK officially announced the resumption of full-scale hostilities. The collapse of the ceasefire has been linked to AKP's poor performance in the recent election in June 2015. Erdogan resumed military hostilities in order to boost nationalist votes, dissolved the freshly elected parliament and successfully won the November 2015 Turkish general election. The induced Third PKK insurgency (2015–2025) lead to 30,000 more deaths : over 7,000 in Turkey and 23,000 in foreign operations.

== Impact ==
On 24 August, President Erdoğan of AKP called for a snap election. HDP leadership accused the ruling AKP of orchestrating nationalist attacks against them, HDP volunteers facing a "campaign of lynching" with HDP offices being attacked, in one instance 200 times in two days. As fighting intensified, military curfew was imposed in 100 areas in southeastern Turkey, most notably in Cizre's 2015 clashes. HDP accused the ruling AKP of looking to reignite war with PKK and stoke unrest to revive nationalist support ahead of the 1 November election.

On 1 November 2015, the November 2015 Turkish general election provided a major gain to the AKP (49.5% of votes, +8.6%) and decrease for the HDP (10.7% of votes, -2.4%). The HDP narrowly hovered the 10% election threshold needed to win seats. The low score of the HDP has been linked to the renewal of violence and fear of ISIS attacks on HDP political rallies.

== Trial and acquittal ==
In March 2018, all nine PKK suspects of the July 2015 killing of the two Turkish policemen in Ceylanpınar, which led AKP to denounce the peace process and resume the conflict, were acquitted by the Turkish Court as no substantial evidence was provided. On 16 April 2019, the nine suspected PKK operatives' acquittal was upheld by a higher court. No suspects have been confirmed for the 22 July 2015's casus belli.

== See also ==
- Dolmabahce Agreement (2015)
- 2015 Suruç bombing#Ceylanpınar's double assassination
- 2015 police raids in Turkey § Kurdish separatists
- Operation Martyr Yalçın#Kurdistan Workers' Party (PKK)
- Kurdish–Turkish conflict (2015–present)
- Kurdish–Turkish conflict (1978–present)
- Rally 'round the flag effect

== External ==
- Hoffman, Max. "The State of the Turkish-Kurdish Conflict". Center for American Progress.
- "Ceylanpınar iddianamesi çöktü. Katil(ler) kim?". www.cumhuriyet.com.tr (in Turkish).
- "2005-2015 PKK-Türkiye Görüşmeleri: Çözüm ile Derinleşen Çözümsüzlük (2005-2015 PKK-Turkey Talks: Diving into the non-settlement Solution)". 2017.
