= Bingöl Province =

Province of Turkey

Bingöl Province Bingöl ili
- Province
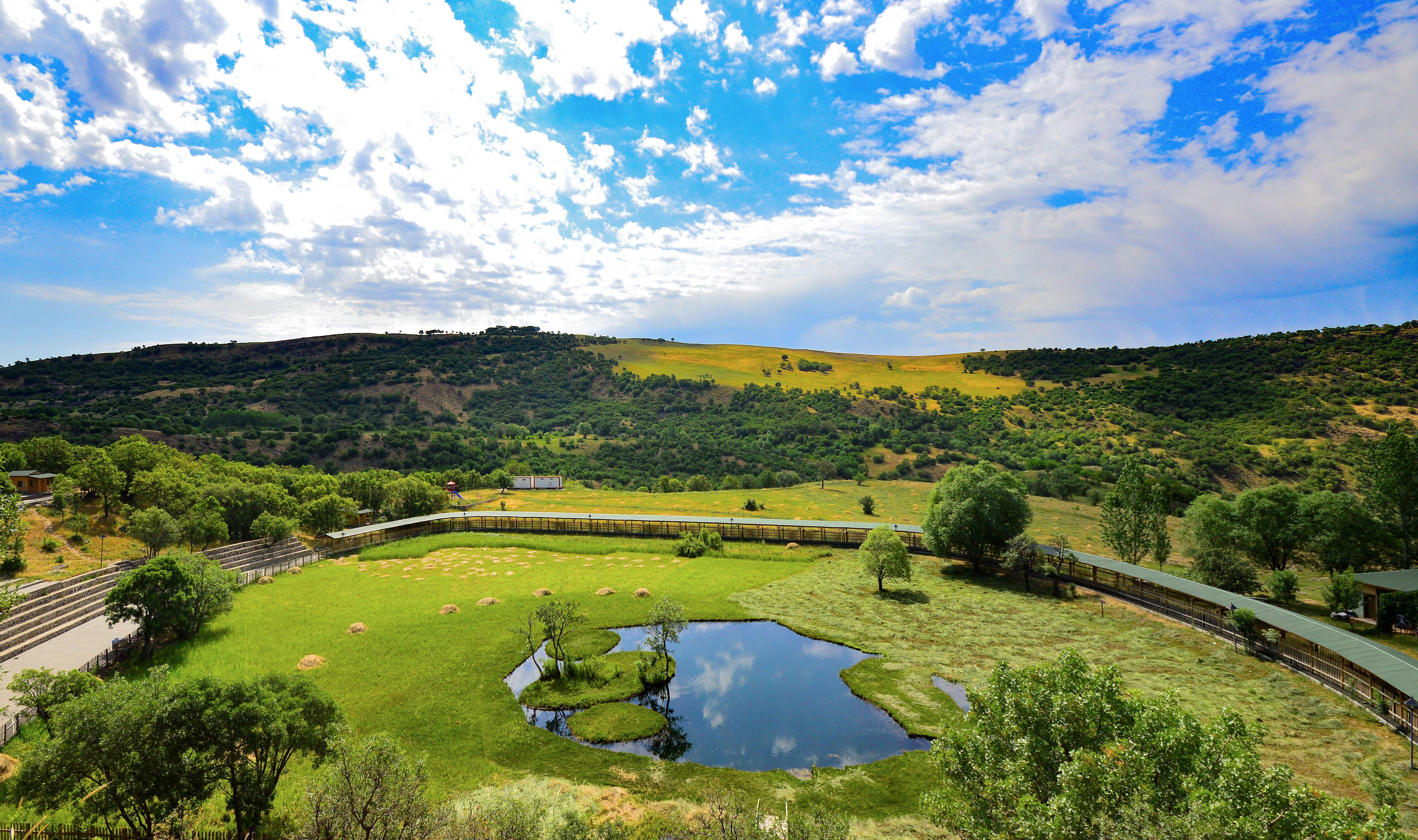
- Floating Islands, Solhan

- Location of the province within Turkey
- Coordinates: 39°02′28″N 40°40′33″E
- Country: Turkey
- Seat: Bingöl

Government
  - Governor: Cahit Çelik
- Area: 8,003 km^{2} (3,090 sq mi)
- Population (2022): 282,556
  - Density: 35.31/km^{2} (91.44/sq mi)
- Time zone: UTC+3 (TRT)
- Area code: 0426
- Website: www.bingol.gov.tr

Bingöl Province (Turkish: Bingöl ili; Kurdish: Parêzgeha Çewlîg; Zazaki: Wîlayetî Çewlîg; Armenian: Ճապաղջուր զավառ) is a province of Turkey. The province was known as Çapakçur Province (Armenian: Ճապաղջուր, lit. 'spread out water') before 1945 when it was renamed as Bingöl Province. Its area is 8,003 km^{2}, and its population is 282,556 (2022). The province encompasses 11 municipalities, 325 villages and 693 hamlets.

The town of Genç was the scene of origin for the Sheikh Said rebellion in 1925 and most of the region was captured by the rebels during the rebellion.

As the current Governor of the province, Ahmet Hamdi Usta was appointed by the president in August 2023.

== Geography ==
The largest lake in Bingöl Province is Lake Bahri. The main mountains in Bingöl province are the Genç Mountains, Akçara Mountains, Şerafettin Mountains and Bingöl Mountains.

== Demographics ==
Historical population
Year	Pop.	±% p.a.
1940	70,184	—
1950	97,328	+3.32%
1960	131,364	+3.04%
1970	177,951	+3.08%
1980	228,702	+2.54%
1990	250,966	+0.93%
2000	253,739	+0.11%
2010	255,170	+0.06%
2020	281,768	+1.00%
Source:Turkstat

Kurds comprise the majority of the province and the province is considered part of Turkish Kurdistan. Its population is majority Sunni, conservative and many adhere to the Naqshbandi order. The province moreover has a significant Alevi minority. Linguistically, the southern parts of the province speak Zaza, while the northern parts speak Kurmanji. Many Zaza-speakers speak Kurmanji as well.

=== Language and religion statistics ===
Bingöl Province was part of Bitlis Vilayet during the Ottoman era as Genç Sanjak and had a population of 36,011 in the 1881-1882 census. 85.7% of the population was Muslim and the remaining 14.3% was Armenian. In the census of 1897, the sanjak had a population of 47,652, of which 88.1% was Muslim and 11.9% was Armenian. All of the Armenians adhered to the Armenian Apostolic Church.

In the 1906-1907 census, the sanjak had a population of 45,215 of which 86.8% was Muslim and Armenians comprised the remaining 13.2%. In the last Ottoman census in 1914, the region had a population of 38,096 of which 93.9% was Muslim and 6.1% Armenian.

The first Turkish census which included Bingöl Province was the 1945 census, where the population was 75,550 who all were Muslims. Linguistically, the most spoken first language was Kurdish at 55.7%, followed by Turkish at 43.8% and Circassian at 0.4%. In the 1950 census, Kurdish was the first language for 76.5% of the population of 97,328, while Turkish remained the second largest language standing at 22.9% and Circassian at 0.4%. In the last census in 1965, Kurdish stood at 58.3% and Turkish at 41.6%.

A 2016 survey showed that 90.4% of the population spoke Turkish, 64.1% spoke Zaza, 40.1% spoke Kurmanji and 5.6% spoke Arabic.

== History ==
From 1923 to 1929, Bingöl Province was part of Elazığ Province and part of Muş Province from 1929 to 1936. It ultimately became a province in 1936.

In December 1935 the Tunceli Law was passed which demanded a more powerful government in the region. Therefore, the region containing the present Bingöl province, together with the provinces of Tunceli, Erzincan and Elaziğ were included in the Fourth Inspectorate General (Umumi Müfettişlik, UM) in January 1936. The fourth UM was governed by a Governor Commander. All the employees in the municipalities were to be from the military and the Governor Commander had the authority to evacuate whole villages and resettle them in other parts of the province. in 1946 the Tunceli Law was abolished and the state of emergency removed but the authority of the fourth UM was transferred to the military. The Inspectorate General was dissolved in 1952 during the Government of the Democrat Party.

== Districts ==
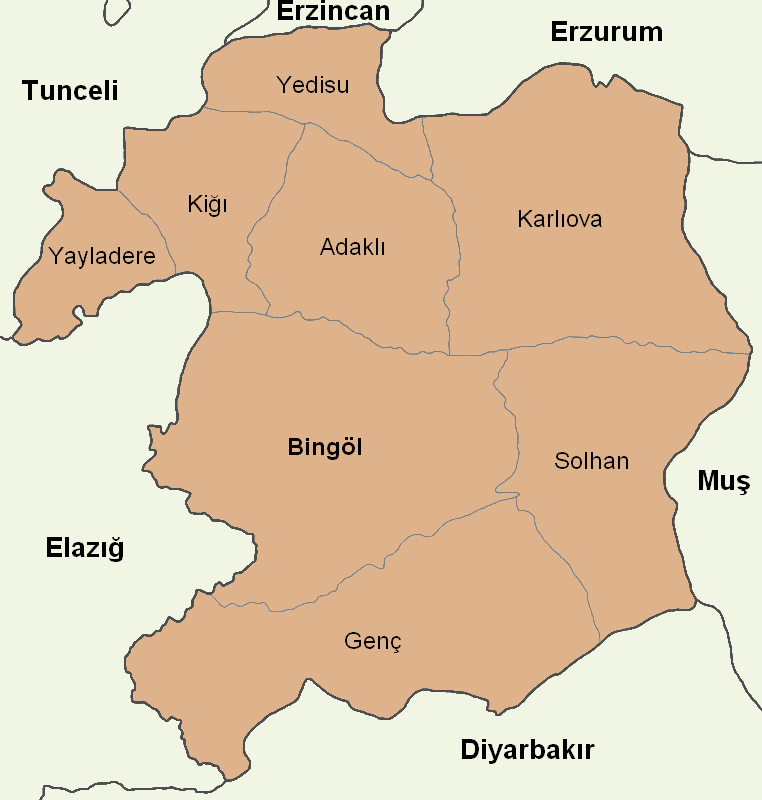
Districts of Bingöl Province

Bingöl province is divided into 8 districts (capital district in bold):

- Adaklı
- **Bingöl**
- Genç
- Karlıova
- Kiğı
- Solhan
- Yayladere
- Yedisu

== Gallery ==
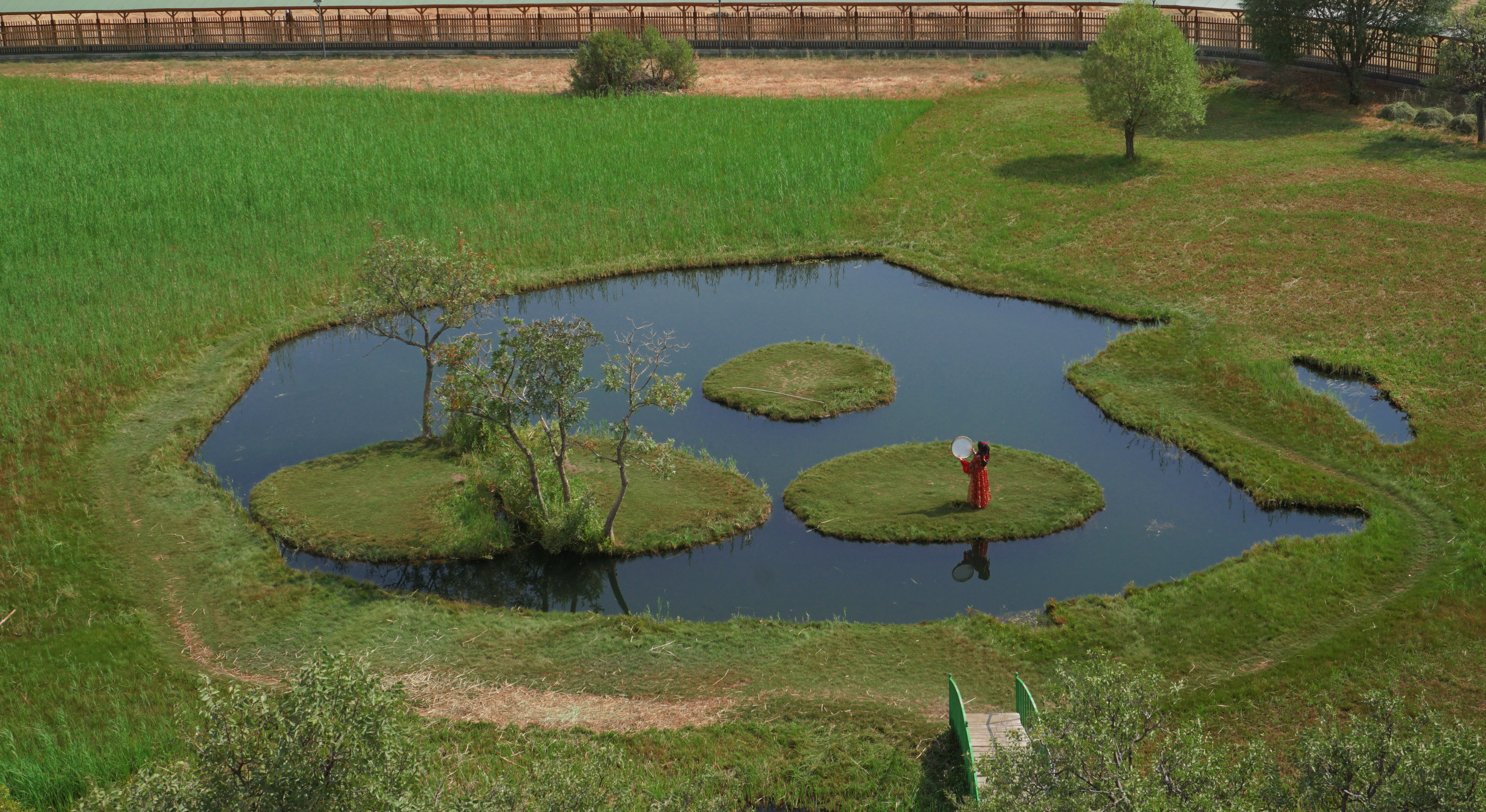
Floating islands (Bingöl)

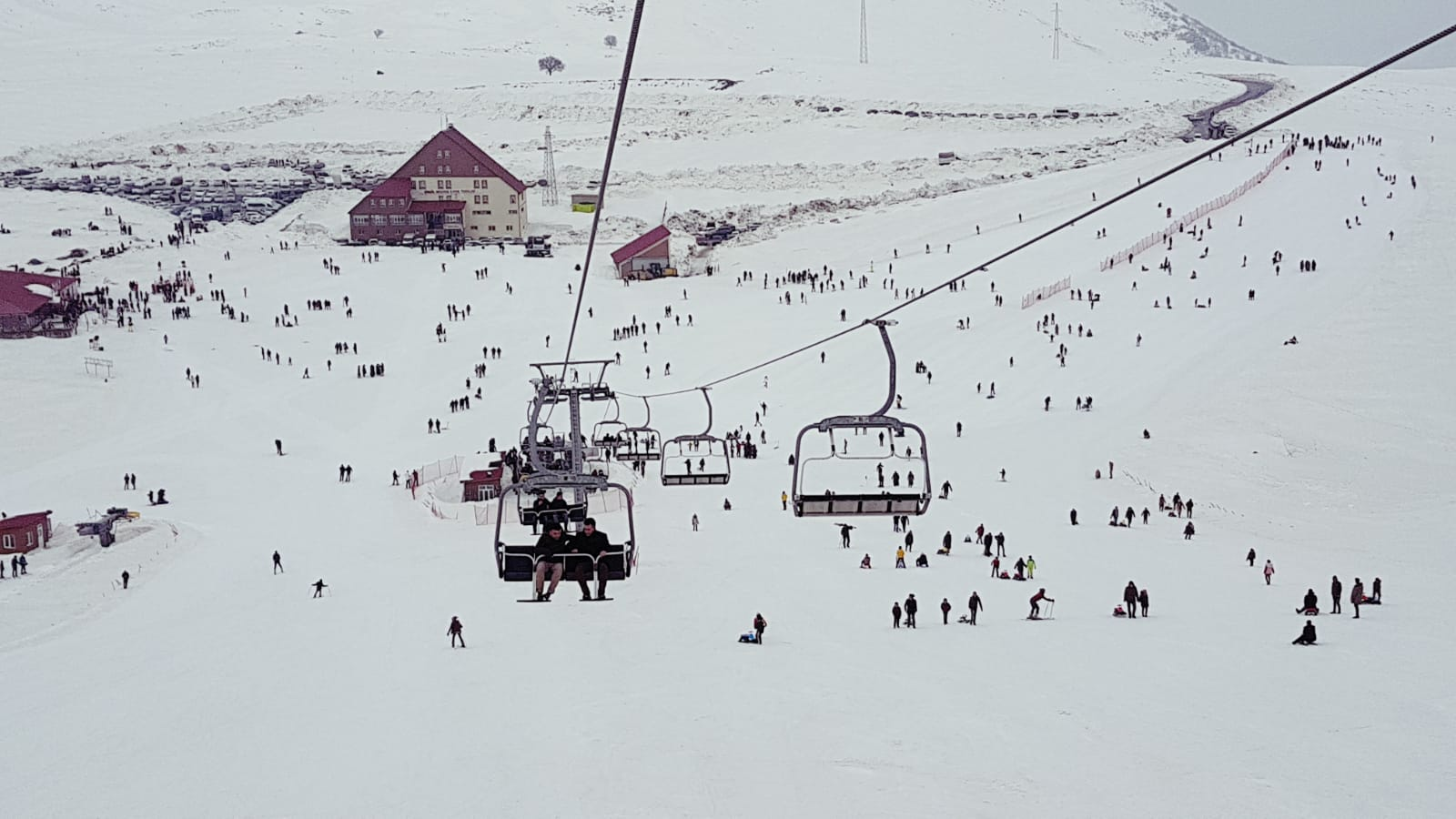
Haserek ski facilities

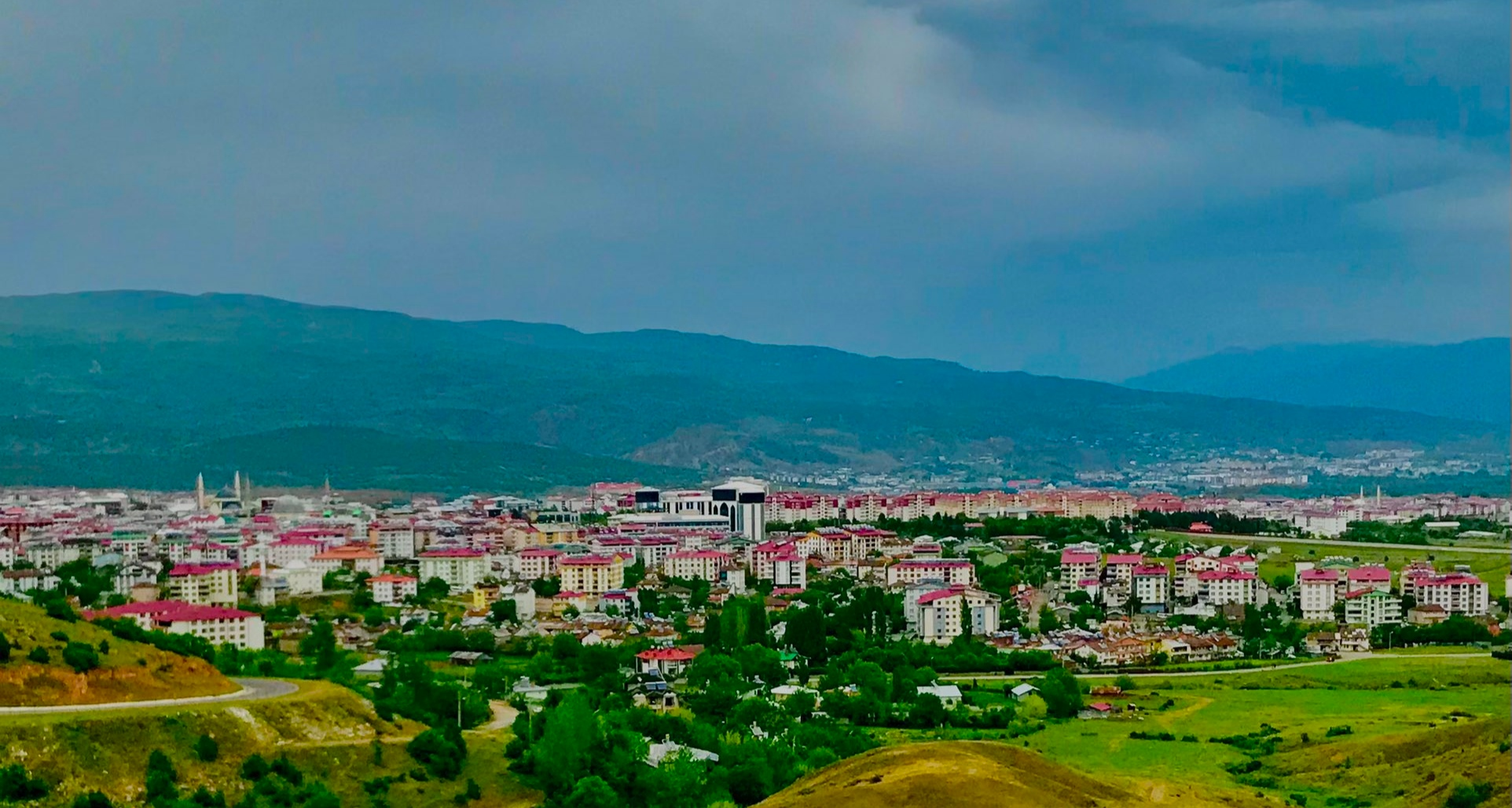
Bingöl center

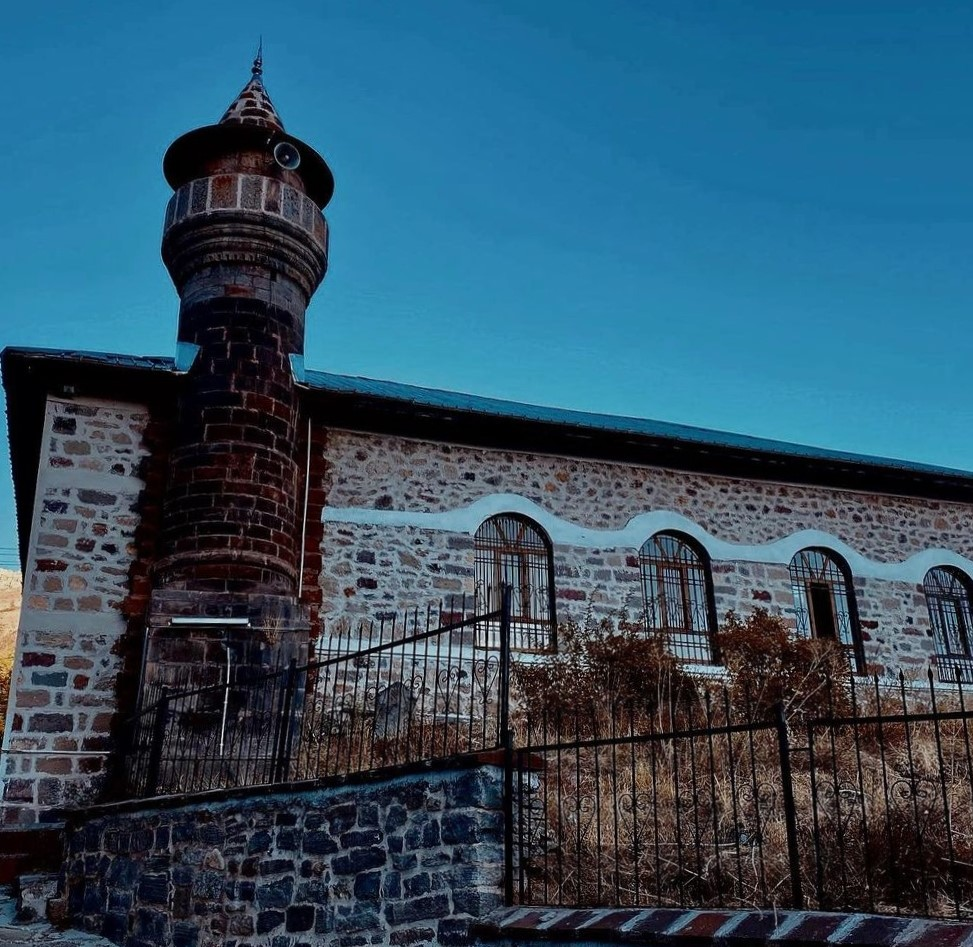
Piltan (Balaban Bey) Mosque

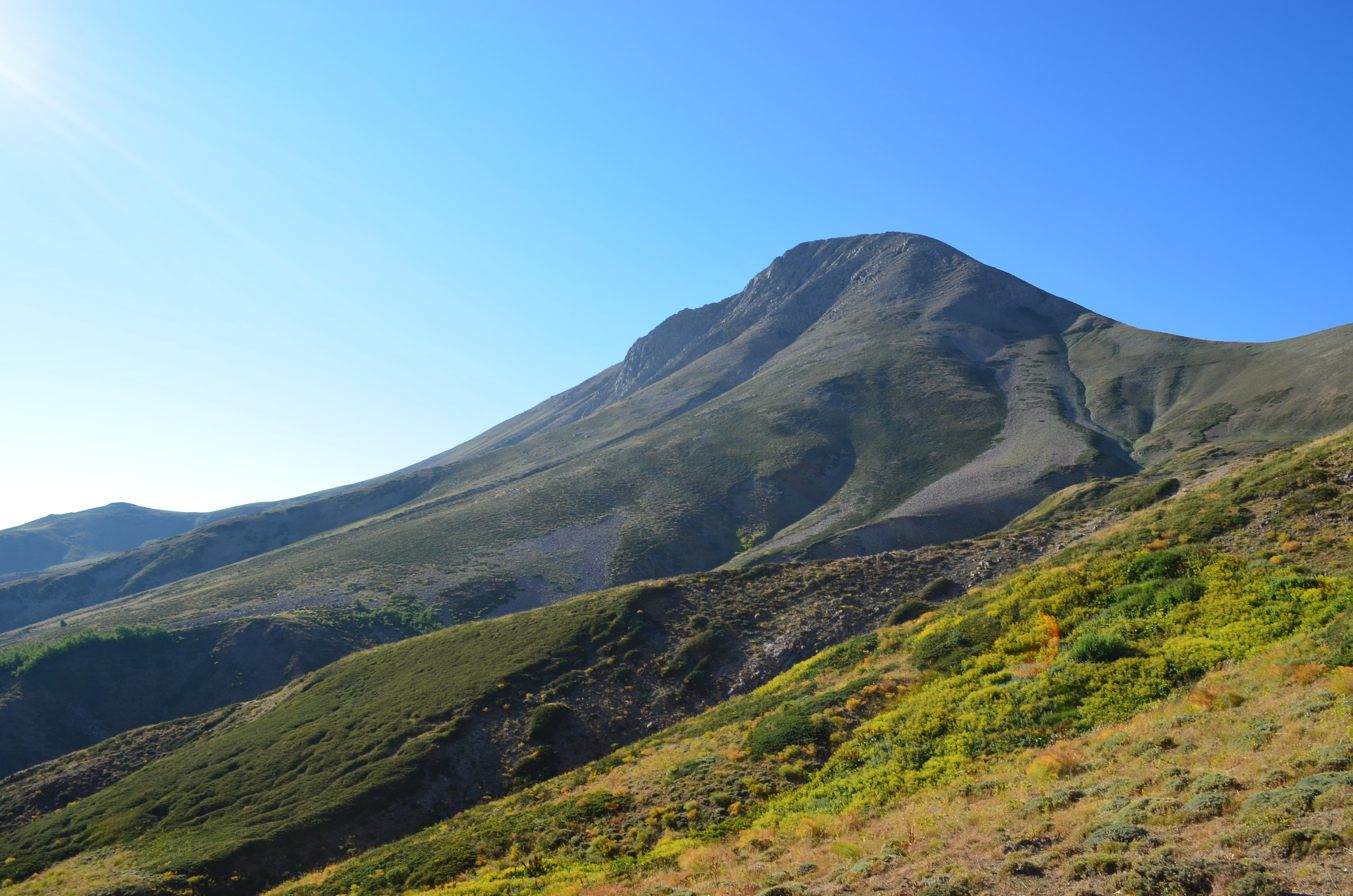
Sülbüs Mountain

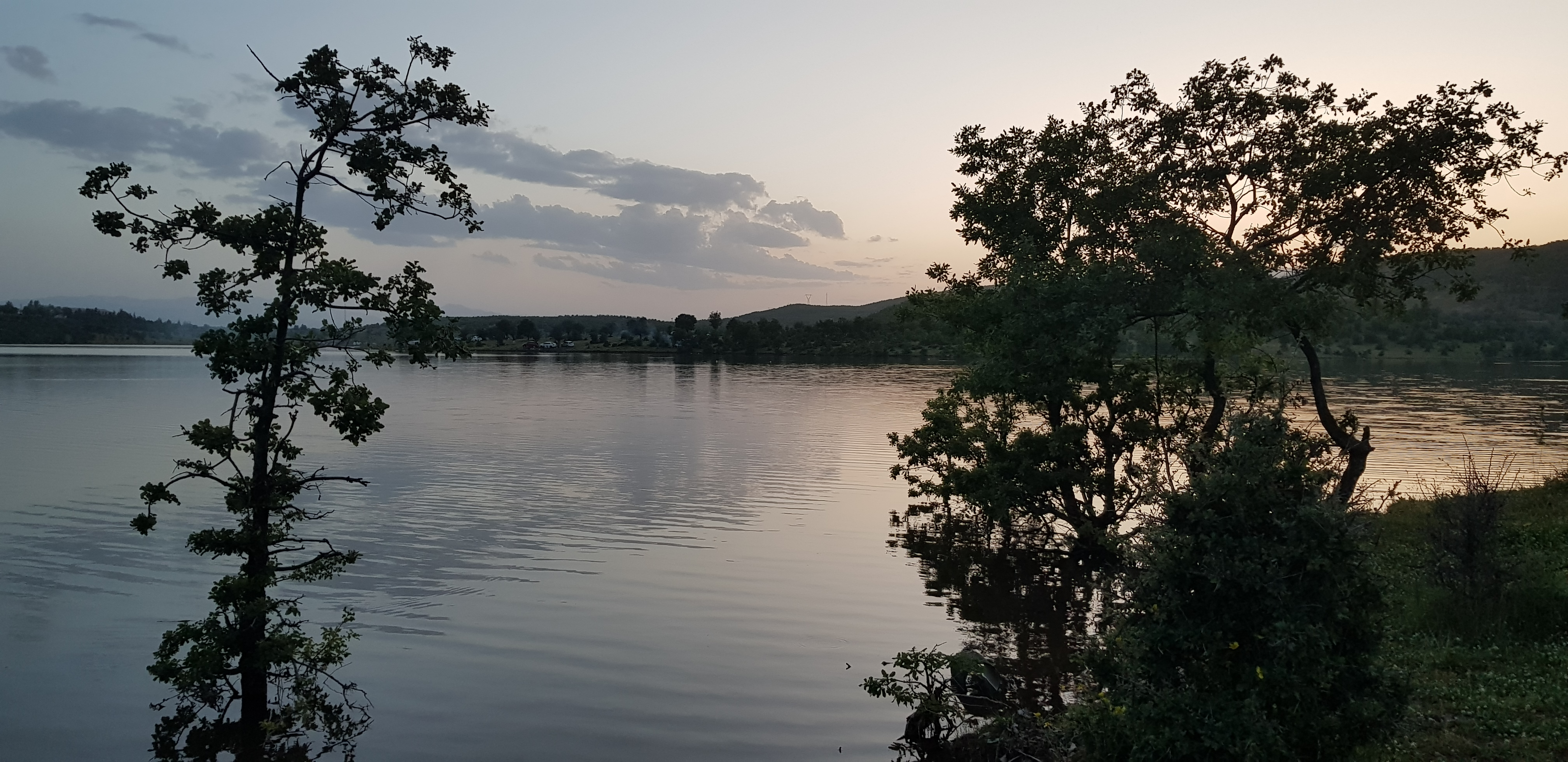
Gülbahar Barrage

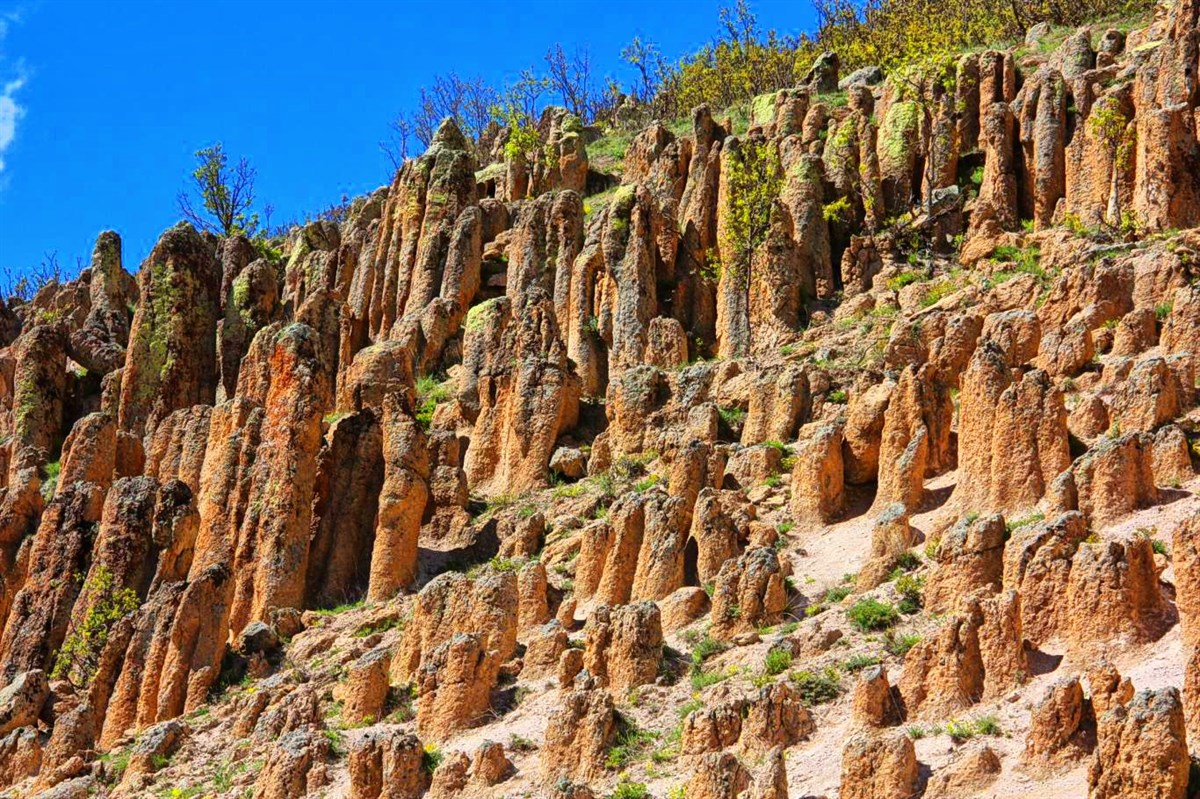
Buban Fairy Chimneys in the village of Oğuldere

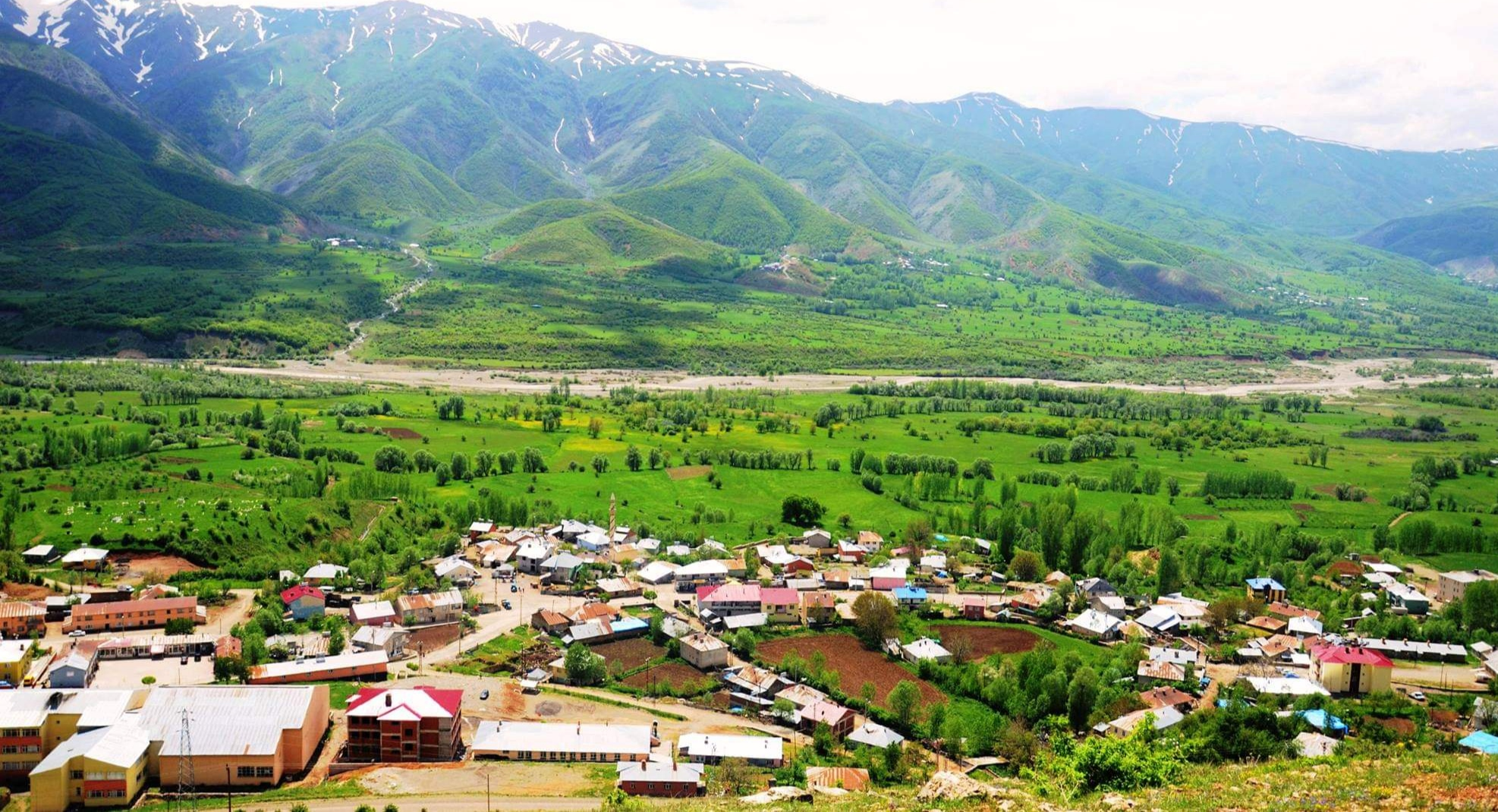
Yedisu, Bingöl.

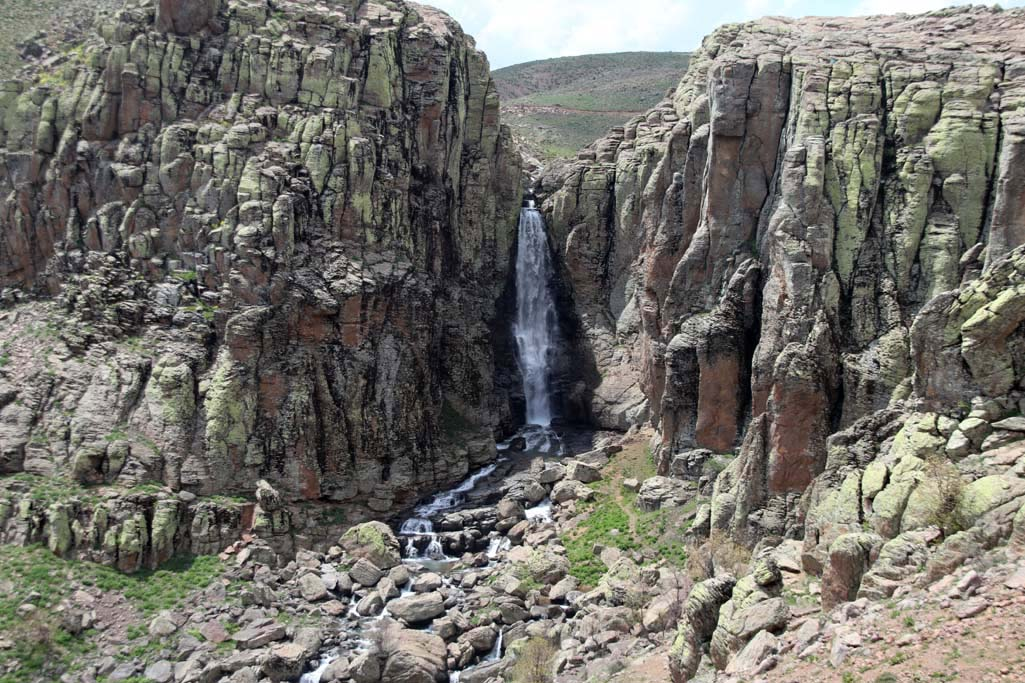
Çır waterfall, also known as Çır Şelalesi

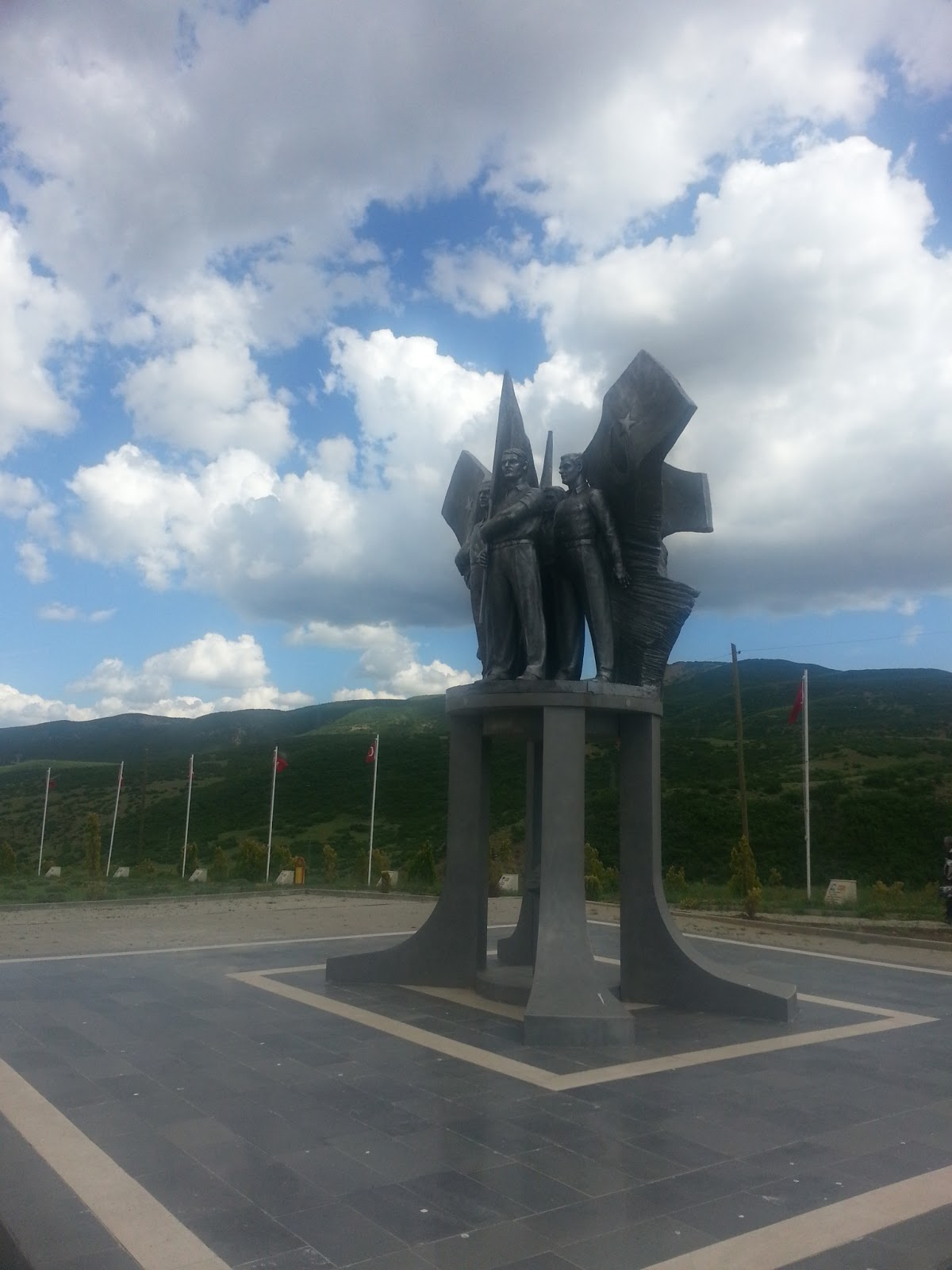
33 Martyrs Memorial

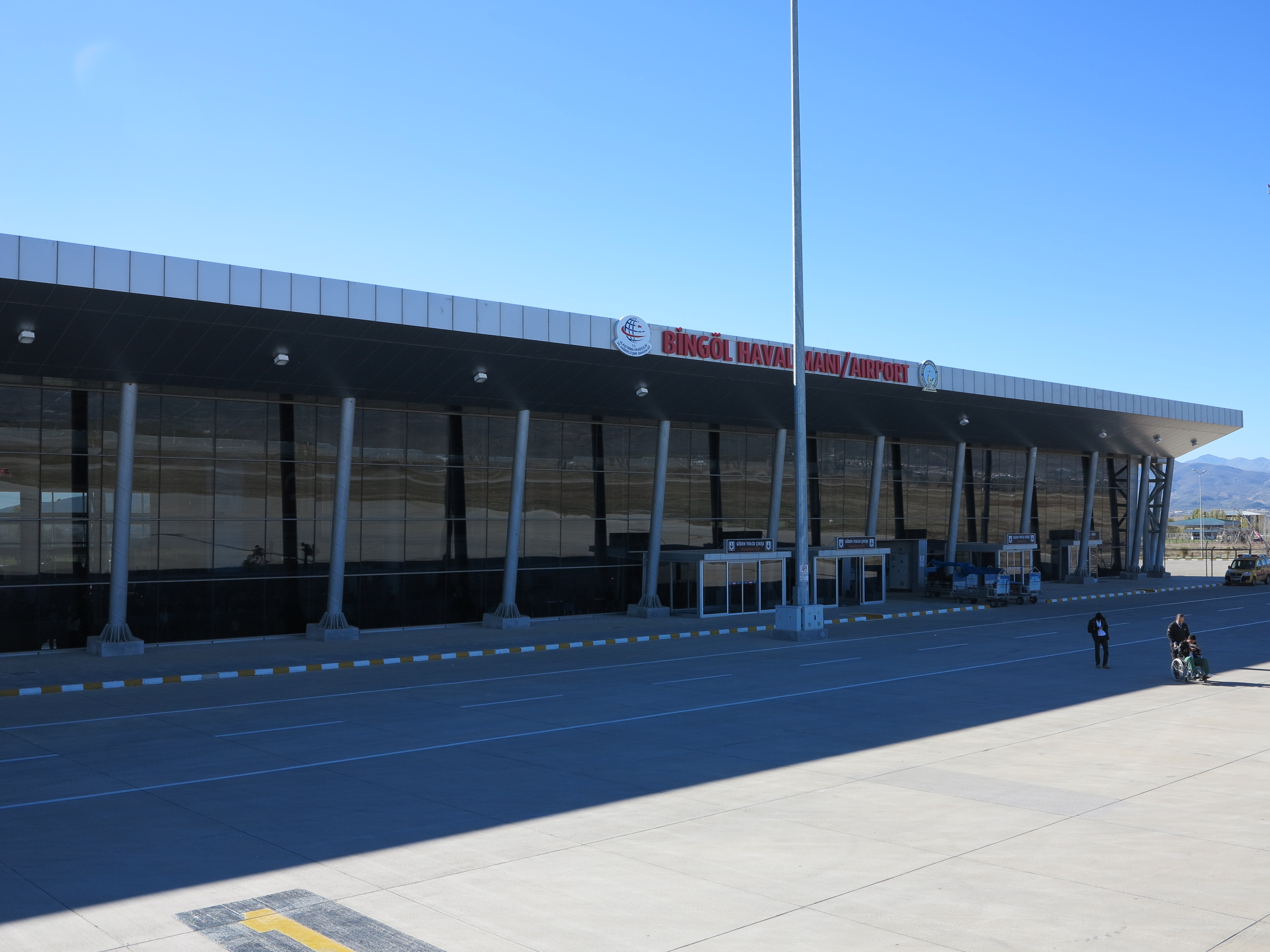
Bingöl Airport

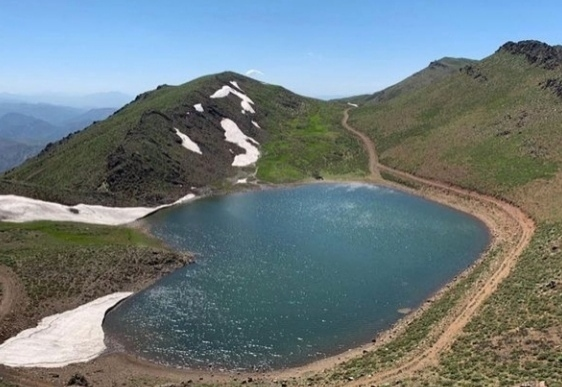
Gerendal Lake

== Bibliography ==
- Dündar, Fuat (2000), Türkiye nüfus sayımlarında azınlıklar (in Turkish), Civiyazilari, ISBN 9789758086771
