= 2013–2015 PKK–Turkey peace process =

Failed peace process between Kurdish militants and Turkey

The Solution process (Turkish: Çözüm süreci), also known as the Peace process (Turkish: Barış süreci; Kurdish: Proseya Aştiyê) or the PKK–Turkish peace process, was a peace process that aimed to resolve the conflict between Turkey and the Kurdistan Workers' Party as part of the Kurdish–Turkish conflict (1978–2025). The conflict, which began in 1984, which has now ended as of 2025 and has resulted in over 40,000 mortal casualties and great economic losses for Turkey and its Kurdish majority southeastern areas as well as high damage to the general population.

Though there was a unilateral cease-fire between 1999 and 2004, the sides failed to gain understanding, and the conflict became increasingly violent. The 2013 truce was working until the truce fully collapsed in 2015, following the Ceylanpınar incidents, in which the PKK killed two Turkish policemen, accusing Turkey to have collaborated with the Islamic State (IS) in the Suruç bombing.

== Background ==
The Turkey-PKK conflict is an armed conflict between the Republic of Turkey and people related to PKK, which have demanded freedom from Turkey to create an independent Kurdistan, or to have autonomy and greater political and cultural rights for Kurds inside the Republic of Turkey. The PKK is considered a terrorist organisation by Turkey, the United States, and the European Union. Although insurgents have carried out attacks in many regions of Turkey, the insurgency is mainly in southeastern Turkey. The PKK's military presence in Iraq's Kurdistan Region, which it uses as launchpad for attacks on Turkey, has resulted in the Turkish military carrying out frequent ground incursions and air and artillery strikes in the region, as the Kurdistan Regional Government claimed they do not have sufficient military forces to prevent the PKK from operating. The conflict has particularly affected Turkey's tourism industry and has cost the economy of Turkey an estimated 300 to 450 billion dollars, mainly military expenses.

Since the PKK was founded on November 27, 1978, it has been involved in armed clashes with Turkish security forces. The full-scale insurgency however, did not begin until August 15, 1984 when the PKK announced a Kurdish uprising. The first insurgency lasted until September 1, 1999 when the PKK declared a unilateral cease-fire. The armed conflict was later resumed on June 1, 2004, when the PKK declared an end to its cease-fire. Since summer 2011, the conflict has become increasingly violent with resumption of large-scale hostilities.

== Developments ==
In November 2012 about 10,000 prisoners were in a hunger strike and had the following three demands. They wanted to defend themselves in Kurdish language while being in court, the improvement of the detention conditions of Abdullah Öcalan, and the start of a peace process between Turkey and the PKK. The Academics for Peace actively supported those demands. On the 16 December the Chief of the National Intelligence Organization (MIT) Hakan Fidan held a talk with Abdullah Öcalan. On the 28 December 2012, Erdoğan made the meeting public and stated that the government was in negotiations with jailed rebel leader Öcalan. The negotiations were initially named the Solution Process (Çözüm Süreci) in public. While negotiations were going on, there were numerous events that were regarded as sabotage to derail the talks: The assassination of the PKK administrators Sakine Cansız, Fidan Doğan and Leyla Söylemez in Paris, revealing Öcalan's talks with the Peoples' Democratic Party (HDP) publicly via the Milliyet newspaper and finally, the bombings of the Justice Ministry of Turkey and Erdoğan's office at the Justice and Development Party (AKP) headquarters in Ankara. However, both parties vehemently condemned all three events as they occurred and stated that they were determined anyway. Finally on 21 March 2013, after months of negotiations with the Turkish Government, Abdullah Ocalan's message to the people was read both in Turkish and Kurdish during the Newroz celebrations in Diyarbakır. The letter called a cease-fire that included disarmament and withdrawal from Turkish soil and calling an end to armed struggle. PKK announced that they would obey, stating that the year of 2013 is the year of solution either through war or through peace. Erdoğan welcomed the letter stating that concrete steps will follow PKK's withdrawal.

On 25 April 2013, the PKK announced that it withdraws all its forces within Turkey to northern Iraq. According to the government and the Kurds and to most of the press, this move marks the end of a 30-year-old conflict. The second phase which includes constitutional and legal changes towards the recognition of human rights of the Kurds starts simultaneously with withdrawal.

=== Wise people committee ===
The government announced its long-awaited list of "wise men" on April 4, the members of a seven-region commission tasked with explaining the ongoing settlement process with the Kurdistan Workers' Party (PKK) to the public and promoting the negotiations. Deputy Prime Minister Bülent Arınç announced the list of "wise people", several weeks after the government first announced plans to set up such a commission made up of intellectuals and well-liked public figures.

The list includes celebrities who are intellectuals, writers and academics as well as singers such as Orhan Gencebay. The commission is made up of groups organized on a regional basis, and will be active in seven regions across the country. On Tuesday, while mystery still shrouded the identities of the government's list of wise people, Erdoğan said, "We will listen to the views and suggestions of the people who are part of this delegation, consult with them and they will organize some events in [the country's] regions and get together with our citizens and local public opinion leaders." In a speech on March 23, the prime minister defined the role of the commission, saying they will be conducting a "psychological operation," indicating the wise people will act as public relations agents. In a speech he made in Ankara on March 23, Erdoğan stated, "It is important to prepare the public for this and social perceptions should be created by the wise men." He said only public acceptance can fend off nationalistic shows.

The Republican People's Party (CHP) and the Nationalist Movement Party (MHP) were critical of the wise men list, claiming that the people on the list are all supportive of the government. On April 5, Prime Minister Recep Tayyip Erdoğan met for the first time with members of the wise men commission. After five weeks of work, the Wise Persons committee gave its first report to Turkish Prime Minister Recep Tayyip Erdoğan and shared their impressions on the level of support regarding the process. The meeting lasted over four hours.

Members of wise people committee classified by region:

Aegean Region
- Chairman: Tarhan Erdem
- Vice Chairman: Avni Özgürel
- Secretary: Arzuhan Doğan Yalçındağ
- Hasan Karaya
- Hilal Kaplan
- Fuat Keyman
- Fehmi Koru
- Baskın Oran

Black Sea Region

- Chairman: Yusuf Şevki Hakyemez
- Vice Chairman: Vedat Bilgin
- Secretary: Fatma Benli
- Şemsi Bayraktar
- Kürşat Bumin
- Oral Çalışlar
- Orhan Gencebay
- Yıldıray Oğur
- Bendevi Palandöken

Central Anatolia Region

- Chairman: Ahmet Taşgetiren
- Vice Chairman: Beril Dedeoğlu
- Secretary: Cemal Uşşak
- Vahap Coşkun
- Doğu Ergil
- Erol Göka
- Mustafa Kumlu
- Fadime Özkan
- Celalettin Can

Eastern Anatolia region

- Chairman: Can Paker
- Vice Chairman: Sibel Eraslan
- Secretary: Ayhan Ogan
- Mahmut Arslan
- Abdurrahman Dilipak
- İzzettin Doğan
- Abdurrahman Kurt
- Zübeyde Teker
- Mehmet Uçum

Marmara Region

- Chairman: Deniz Ülke Arıboğan
- Vice Chairman: Mithat Sancar
- Secretary: Levent Korkut
- Mustafa Armağan
- Ali Bayramoğlu
- Ahmet Gündoğdu
- Hayrettin Karaman
- Hülya Koçyiğit
- Yücel Sayman

Mediterranean Region

- Chairman: Rifat Hisarcıklıoğlu
- Vice Chairman: Lale Mansur
- Secretary: Tarık Çelenk
- Kadir İnanır
- Nihal Bengisu Karaca
- Şükrü Karatepe
- Muhsin Kızılkaya
- Öztürk Türkdoğan
- Hüseyin Yayman

Southeastern Anatolia Region

- Chairman: Yılmaz Ensaroğlu
- Vice Chairman: Kezban Hatemi
- Secretary: Mehmet Emin Ekmen
- Murat Belge
- Fazıl Hüsnü Erdem
- Yılmaz Erdoğan
- Etyen Mahçupyan
- Lami Özgen
- Ahmet Faruk Ünsal

== Timeline ==
- Wednesday 28 December 2012: Prime Minister Recep Tayyip Erdoğan revealed that the National Intelligence Organization (MİT) had been visiting Abdullah Öcalan to find a solution to end the conflict.
- Thursday 3 January 2013: Ahmet Türk and BDP deputy Ayla Akat Ata went to İmralı island where they met Abdullah Öcalan.
- Wednesday 9 January 2013: Founding member of the PKK Sakine Cansız and Kurdish activists Fidan Doğan and Leyla Söylemez were assassinated in Paris.
- Thursday 14 February 2013: The Turkish government has announced that a second delegation of BDP members will be meeting with Öcalan.
- Friday 15 February 2013: Erdogan said that the negotiations between MIT and Ocalan would be more accurate if it's called 'Solution process' rather than as 'Imralı process'.
- Saturday 23 February 2013: BDP deputy parliamentary group chair Pervin Buldan, Istanbul deputy Sırrı Süreyya Önder and Diyarbakır deputy Altan Tan went to Öcalan's prison on İmralı island. The delegation, which was granted special authorization by the Ministry of Justice to hold deliberations with Abdullah Öcalan, heard out the PKK leader's proposed roadmap for the government to put an end to the issue of terrorism in the country. Öcalan also passed on letters to Kandil, the PKK's European administration and to the public via the BDP delegation.
- Thursday 28 February 2013: Daily Milliyet published a story by Namık Durukan claiming to be what was partially discussed between imprisoned PKK leader Abdullah Öcalan and the three members of the Kurdish Peace and Democracy Party during their visit to Imrali.
- Monday 11 March 2013: A six-person delegation has left Diyarbakır to meet the eight public workers to be released by PKK in Iraq. The delegation included the BDP politicians Sebahat Tuncel, Adil Kurt and Hüsamettin Zenderlioğlu as well as the president of Human Rights Association (IHD) and the Chairman of Mazlumder.
- Wednesday 13 March 2013: The PKK freed eight Turkish prisoners held for two years in Iraq. The release of the eight captives came after a request by Öcalan.
- Monday 18 March 2013: Kurdish parliamentarians set off by boat to visit Abdullah Ocalan in his island prison. The delegation includes BDP co-chair Selahattin Demirtaş, deputies Pervin Buldan and Sırrı Süreyya Önder.
- Thursday 21 March 2013: After months of negotiations with the Turkish Government, Abdullah Ocalan's letter to people was read both in Turkish and Kurdish during Nowruz celebrations in Diyarbakır. The letter called a cease-fire that included disarmament and withdrawal from Turkish soil and calling an end to armed struggle.
- Friday 29 March 2013: Erdoğan said that PKK militants who withdraw from Turkey will have to lay down their arms before crossing the border in order to prevent further confrontation. He also said "that when they go, the atmosphere of my country will change when we realize the economic boom in the east [after the withdrawal]."
- Wednesday 3 April 2013: Turkey has set up a consultative body of "wise people" to help shape public opinion on the peace process with the PKK.
- Thursday 4 April 2013: Republican People's Party (CHP) and Nationalist Movement Party (MHP) announced that they would not take part in a commission that would be established to assess the solution process for Kurdish issue within the parliament. Both CHP and MHP said they would not send members to that commission. Erdoğan met on for the first time with members of the wise men commission, tasked with explaining to the public the ongoing settlement process with the Kurdistan Workers' Party (PKK) and to promote the negotiations.
- Saturday 20 April 2013: Sırrı Süreyya Önder said that PKK withdrawal will start in eight to 10 days.
- Thursday 25 April 2013: PKK announced that it withdraws all its forces within Turkey to Iraq on May 8.
- Wednesday 8 May 2013: PKK members start withdrawal from Turkey. A parliamentary commission - in charge of researching the means of societal peace and determine on the ongoing resolution process in Turkey - has held its first meeting last night, pledging to inform the public more on the process and launch investigations in Turkey and abroad.
- Thursday 9 May 2013: The wise people committee gave its first report to Erdoğan and shared their impressions on the level of support regarding the process.
- In July 2014 the parliament passed The Law on Ending Terror and Strengthening Social Integration which protected the state officials negotiating with the PKK from legal prosecution but not the HDP lawmakers.
- 20 August 2014: Lieutenant Emre As is killed and a recruit is wounded in a PKK ambush.
- Saturday 27 September 2014: 3 police officers are killed. The PKK shot two police officers after Turkey would not allow members of the PKK to travel/return to Syria and the besieged town of Kobani to fight ISIS.
- 6-8 October 2014 Kurdish riots : 42 civilians were killed during armed conflicts. It was initiated under the leadership of YDG-H members and later grew with the participation of HÜDA-PAR supporters and Grey Wolves. Some of the demonstrators attacked civilians in during protests Curfews were declared in many provinces due to the fact that some of the demonstrators attacked the civilian population and homes, workplaces and vehicles were burned next to many public buildings. As of October 10, 42 people died during the demonstrations. The protesters denouncing Ankara position during Islamic State's siege of Kobani. This is the main incident out of the ceasefire period.
- 28 February 2015 the Dolmabahce Consensus was declared by a joint commission of politician of the HDP and the Turkish Government.
- 7 June 2015: Following largely successful ceasefire period thanks to the government and the rebels efforts, the June 2015 Turkish general election provides major gain to the HDP (13% of votes, +7.5%) and notable decrease for AKP (41% of votes, -9%).
- 20 July 2015: ISIS lead the Suruç bombing, killing 32 people, largely Kurdish. PKK elements accused Turkey of supporting ISIS and being complicit of the bombing.
- 22 July 2015's Ceylanpınar incidents as casus belli: Two police officers are assassinated by unidentified men. Soon after, 9 Turkey Kurds are anonymously denounced as the killers, accused of assassinations under PKK orders. PKK initially claimed responsibility but later denied any links to the murders. The Turkish Daily Sabah reports the policemen were asleep when they were killed.
- 24 July 2015: Erdogan government simultaneously starts a large scale police operations while the Turkish military begins a large-scale military Operation Martyr Yalçın against PKK and ISIL. As a result, PKK announces the resumption of full-scale hostilities. The collapse of the ceasefire have been linked to the poor performance at the June election.
- 24 August 2015: President Erdogan called for snap election.
- 1 November 2015: The November 2015 Turkish general election provide a major gain to the AKP (49,5% of votes, +8.6%) and decrease for HDP (10,7% of votes, -2.4%). The HDP narrowly hovering the 10% election threshold needed to win seats. The low score of the HDP has been linked to the renewal of violence and fear of IS attacks on HDP political rallies.
- March 2018: all 9 PKK suspects in the July 2015 killing the two Turkish policemen in Ceylanpınar, which lead AKP to denounce the peace process and resume war, were acquitted by the Turkey Court as no substantial evidence was provided.
- 16 April 2019: the Ceylanpınar double assassination's 9 suspected PKK operatives' acquittal is upheld by a Higher Court. No suspect has been confirmed for the July 22nd 2015's casus belli.
- 6 May 2019: Ocalan's lawyers release a statement from him after years of isolation. It is believed to be related to the latest Turkish elections (31 March 2019) in which AKP lost control of Istanbul, Ankara and Izmir due to tactical voting by HDP.

== Public opinion ==
On March 21, 2013, a public opinion survey carried out by the ruling Justice and Development Party (AK Party) suggests that almost 57.7 percent of people support ongoing government-sponsored efforts for the settlement of the conflict with PKK. While 10 percent declined to comment, slightly more than 22 percent said they do not support the process. The results of the survey were discussed in a meeting held at AK Party headquarters. According to the survey, the highest support for the government efforts to end Turkey-PKK conflict comes from the Southeast, with 81 percent. The Southeast is followed by the East, with 77 percent. However, the support is lower in the other regions. In Marmara and Central Anatolia, roughly 59 percent of participants in the survey said they support the settlement process, while 49 percent of respondents in the Mediterranean said the same. In the Aegean region, 44 percent of respondents expressed support for the peace talks, and 43 percent in the Black Sea region expressed support.

In early May 2013, the number of supporters increased to 70 percent according to a survey carried out by the AK Party, while a survey conducted by the Konda research company showed that the number of supporters increased to 81.3 percent.

== See also ==
- Kurdish–Turkish peace initiatives 1991–2004
- 2025 Turkey–PKK peace process
- Kurdish–Turkish relations
- List of Middle East peace proposals

- Fatah–Hamas reconciliation process
- Israeli–Palestinian peace process
- Syrian peace process
- Yemeni peace process

- Western Sahara peace process
- Syria–Turkey barrier
- Iran-Turkey border barrier
