= 1991–2004 Kurdish–Turkish peace initiatives =

Kurdish-Turkish peace initiatives, there were several, since the conflict with the Kurdistan Workers' Party began in 1978. Some were successful, others not. But the first real approach to the Kurdish question in Turkey came after the Government of Turgut Özal decided to end the policy of denial of the Kurds and allow the Kurdish language to be spoken in 1991 and later on in the same year also to be broadcast.

== First unilateral ceasefire by the PKK 1993 ==
On the 17 March 1993, Abdullah Öcalan announced a unilateral ceasefire by the PKK in a press conference given together with Jalal Talabani. In an other press conference which took place on the 16 April 1993 in Bar Elias, Lebanon, the ceasefire was prolonged indefinitely. To this event, the Kurdish politicians Jamal Talabani, Ahmet Türk from the HEP and Kemal Burkay also attended and declared their support for the ceasefire. The ceasefire came to an end after prime minister Turgut Özal, whose government had a more peaceful approach towards the Kurds as the former Governments, died two days later on the 17 April 1993 and after Turkish troops launched an attack on the 19 May 1993, where 13 members of the PKK were killed.

== Second unilateral ceasefire by the PKK 1995–1996 ==
In December 1995, the PKK announced a second unilateral ceasefire ahead of the Turkish general elections on 24 December 1995, which thought to give the new Turkish Government time to articulate a more peaceful approach to the conflict between the PKK and Turkey. In the eight months in which the ceasefire was upheld by the PKK, several peace initiatives were initiated by the civil and political society.

== Third unilateral ceasefire by the PKK 1998–2004 ==
On the 1 September 1998, the PKK announced an other unilateral ceasefire, which was announced in purpose to find a political solution to the conflict. Following the ceasefire announcement, Turkey threatened Syria with a military confrontation if it kept up its support for the PKK. Following which Öcalan was expelled from Syria and departed for Europe on the 9 October 1998. Then the Adana Accord was agreed upon, which prohibited Syria from supporting the PKK. In Europe, Öcalan tried to reach out to several countries in search for their assistance in potential peace negotiations, but all attempts failed and he was captured by Turkish special forces on the 15 February 1999 in Nairobi, Kenya and brought to Turkey, where he renewed his proposal for peace negotiations. In 1999 the PKK announced that they would leave their bases in Turkey, and would follow Öcalans bid for an end of armed conflict. In 2004 the cease fire ended and armed conflict resumed.

== Peace initiatives by the civil and political society ==
The Helsinki Citizens' Assembly organized a conference in January 1995 in Istanbul, where the Kurdish-Turkish conflict was discussed extensively. The outcome of the conference encouraged the HCA to organize a statewide campaign for peace in numerous cities in order to facilitate a solution to the conflict. In February 1996 a conference called The Kurdish Problem and the Democratic Solution Symposium was organized by the Kurdish Institute in Istanbul. A second conference called Gathering for Peace appealed to the Turkish Government to act cooperatively to the ceasefire announced by the PKK in December 1995. The Turkish Human Rights Organization called for participation in a campaign called the Musa Anter Peace Train, a train which should have departed the 26 August in Brussels and after stopping in several cities throughout the country should have entered Diyarbakır on the 1 September. But the train was not permitted the transit through Germany, Yugoslavia and Romania. So the participants booked flights to Istanbul from where they organized a convoy of buses towards Diyarbakır. The convoy was not allowed to enter Diyarbakır by the Turkish authorities and on their way back to Istanbul several participants were detained. In December 1997, the photographer Julia Guest organized an exhibition on the journey. An other initiative was initiated in October 1996 by the left wing Freedom and Solidarity Party (ÖDP). A campaign called 1 Million signatures for peace (Turkish: Baris için 1 milyon imza) was called for and its signatures were eventually delivered to the Turkish parliament in May 1997.

== See also ==
- 2013–2015 PKK–Turkish peace process
- A Modern History of the Kurds by David McDowall
