= Governor of Bingöl =

Governor of a Turkish Province

Governor of Bingöl Bingöl Valiliği
- Logo of the Governor of Bingöl
- Incumbent; Cahit Çelik since 21 January 2026
- Appointer: President of Turkey; On the recommendation of the Turkish government
- Term length: No set term length or limit
- Inaugural holder: Recai Türeli; 1936
- Website: Office of the Governor

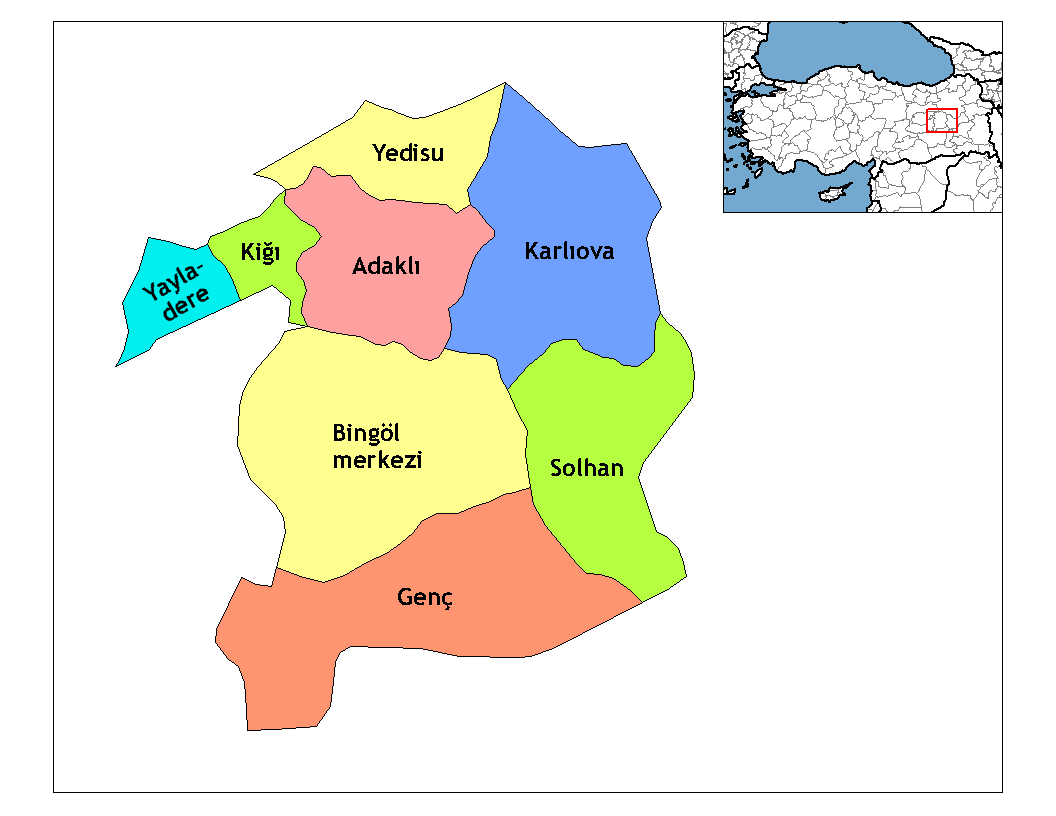
Map of the Province of Bingöl, showing the provincial districts.

The Governor of Bingöl (Turkish: Bingöl Valiliği) is the bureaucratic state official responsible for both national government and state affairs in the Province of Bingöl. Similar to the Governors of the 80 other Provinces of Turkey, the Governor of Bingöl is appointed by the Government of Turkey and is responsible for the implementation of government legislation within Bingöl. The Governor is also the most senior commander of both the Bingöl provincial police force and the Bingöl Gendarmerie.

== Appointment ==
The Governor of Bingöl is appointed by the President of Turkey, who confirms the appointment after recommendation from the Turkish Government. The Ministry of the Interior first considers and puts forward possible candidates for approval by the cabinet. The Governor of Bingöl is therefore not a directly elected position and instead functions as the most senior civil servant in the Province of Bingöl.

=== Term limits ===
The Governor is not limited by any term limits and does not serve for a set length of time. Instead, the Governor serves at the pleasure of the Government, which can appoint or reposition the Governor whenever it sees fit. Such decisions are again made by the cabinet of Turkey. The Governor of Bingöl, as a civil servant, may not have any close connections or prior experience in Bingöl Province. It is not unusual for Governors to alternate between several different Provinces during their bureaucratic career.

== Functions ==
The Governor of Bingöl has both bureaucratic functions and influence over local government. The main role of the Governor is to oversee the implementation of decisions by government ministries, constitutional requirements and legislation passed by Grand National Assembly within the provincial borders. The Governor also has the power to reassign, remove or appoint officials a certain number of public offices and has the right to alter the role of certain public institutions if they see fit. Governors are also the most senior public official within the Province, meaning that they preside over any public ceremonies or provincial celebrations being held due to a national holiday. As the commander of the provincial police and Gendarmerie forces, the Governor can also take decisions designed to limit civil disobedience and preserve public order. Although mayors of municipalities and councillors are elected during local elections, the Governor has the right to re-organise or to inspect the proceedings of local government despite being an unelected position.

== List of governors of Bingöl ==
- Recai Türeli (1936)
- Şefik Bicioğlu (1936–1937)
- M. Saip Okay (1937–1940)
- Sadullah Koloğlu (1940–1941)
- Daniş Yurdakul (1941–1942)
- Halis Bilaloğlu (1942–1944)
- Mehmet Rıfat Şahinbaş (1944–1946)
- Ömer Cevat Ökmen (1946–1947)
- Nihat Danışman (1947)
- Şinasi Turga (1947)
- Ömer Naci Rollas (1947–1950)
- Fahrettin İnal (1950–1951)
- Turgut Başkaya (1951–1953)
- Cenap Aksu (1953–1955)
- Enver Saatçigil (1955)
- Cevat Yurttaş (1955–1960)
- Kemalettin Gazezoğlu (1960–1961)
- Ferruh Güven (1961–1964)
- Hasan Basri Kurdoğlu (1964)
- Orhan Erbuğ (1964–1967)
- Bedri Eser (1967–1968)
- Kemal Öztürk (1968–1970)
- Metin Dirimtekin (1970–1971)
- Ahmet Tosun (1971–1975)
- Dursun Toprak (1975–1977)
- Burhanettin Ergun (1978–1979)
- Ahmet Özer (1979–1982)
- İsmet Metin (1982–1984)
- Kurtuluş Şişmantürk (1984–1985)
- Güner Orbay (1985–1988)
- Fikret Güven (1988–1989)
- Mustafa Bahrettin Demirer (1989–1991)
- Atilla Vural (1991–1992)
- Fevzi Yılmaz (1992–1993)
- Abdulkadir Sarı (1993–1996)
- Atilla Dinçer (1996–1997)
- Süleyman Kamçı (1997–1999)
- Tamer Ersoy (1999–2003)
- Hüseyin Avni Coş (2003)
- Vehbi Avuç (2003–2007)
- İrfan Balkanlıoğlu (2007–2010)
- Mustafa Hakan Güvençer (2010–2013)
- İbrahim Taşyapan (2013–2015)
- Yavuz Selim Köşger (2015–2017)
- Ali Mantı (2017–2018)
- Kadir Ekinci (2018–2023)
- Ahmet Hamdi Usta (2023–2026)
- Dr. Cahit Çelik (2026–)

== See also ==
- Governor (Turkey)
- Bingöl Province
- Ministry of the Interior (Turkey)
