= Suruç bombing =

2015 suicide attack in Suruç, Turkey

- Part of the Turkish involvement in the Syrian Civil War and the Rojava–Islamist conflict
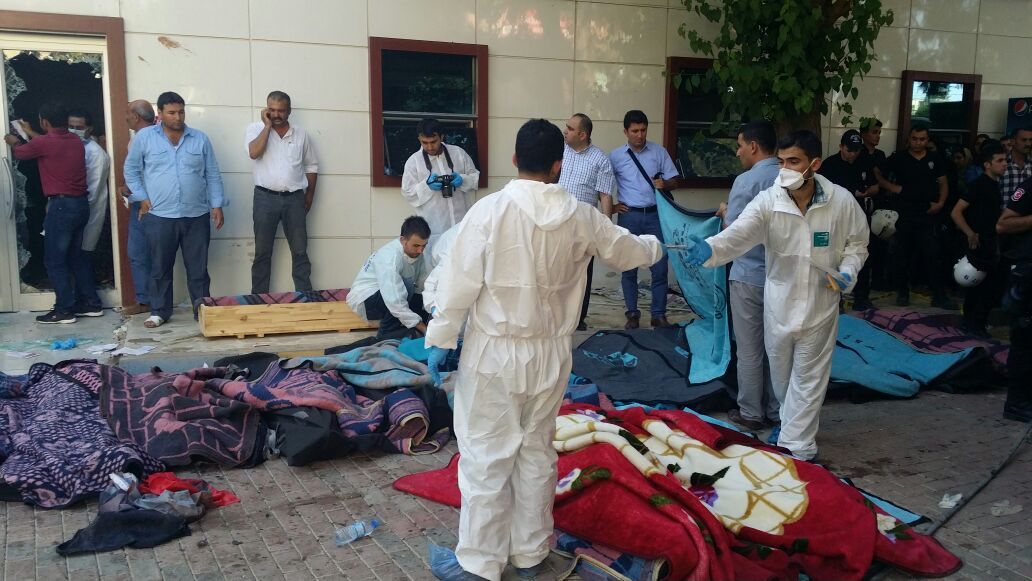
- Forensic experts at the crime scene after the explosion
- Location: 36°58′50″N 38°25′32″E; Suruç, Şanlıurfa Province, Turkey
- Date: 20 July 2015; 12:00 (EEST)
- Target: Members of the Socialist Party of the Oppressed and Socialist Youth Associations Federation
- Attack type: Suicide bombing, mass murder
- Deaths: 34 (including suicide bomber)
- Injuries: 104
- Perpetrator: (Islamic State) Dokumacılar

On 20 July 2015, the Dokumacılar, the Turkish sect of the Islamic State (ISIL), executed a suicide attack in the Suruç district of Şanlıurfa Province in Turkey. The attack took place outside the Amara Culture Centre, killing 34 people including the perpetrator, and 104 further injuries. Most victims were members of the Socialist Party of the Oppressed (ESP) Youth Wing and the Socialist Youth Associations Federation (SGDF), university students who were giving a press statement on their planned trip to reconstruct the Syrian border town of Kobanî.

Kobanî, which is approximately 10 km from Suruç, had been under siege by Islamic State forces until January 2015. More than 300 members of the SGDF had travelled from Istanbul to Suruç to participate in three to four days of rebuilding work in Kobanî, and had been staying at the Amara Cultural Centre while preparing to cross the border. The explosion was caught on camera.

The ISIL claimed responsibility for the attack the following day. ISIL had allegedly made the decision to pursue more active operations in Turkey just days before the attack. The attacker, Şeyh Abdurrahman Alagöz (20), a Kurd from Adıyaman, reportedly had links to ISIL militants. Both the Turkish government and police were accused of turning a blind eye to ISIL activities as part of their collaboration with ISIL and failing to give leftist and Kurdish gatherings the proper law enforcement protection given to other gatherings. Two Turkish police officers were subsequently prosecuted over the bombing. It was possibly the first planned attack by ISIL in Turkey, although previous incidents such as the 2013 Reyhanlı bombings, the 2015 Istanbul suicide bombing, and the 2015 Diyarbakır rally bombings have also been blamed by some on ISIL. Soon after, the Turkish government launched Operation Martyr Yalçın, a series of airstrikes against mostly Kurdish militant positions in Northern Iraq and Syria. Large-scale operations against the Kurdistan Workers' Party (PKK), but including some ISIL targets, began on 24 July; however, most arrests were of PKK members. This led to the resumption of the Kurdish-Turkish conflict (2015-present).

The bombing was met with international condemnation by a variety of organizations, as well as promises by the governing Justice and Development Party (AKP) to tighten the Syria-Turkey border following the attack. The leader of the Nationalist Movement Party (MHP) Devlet Bahçeli criticized the government for not securing the border beforehand and the Peoples' Democratic Party (HDP) for endorsing the intended crossing of the victims to Syria despite the Kobanî massacre.

== Background ==
The district of Suruç is located on the Syrian-Turkish border in the province of Şanlıurfa, approximately 10 kilometres (6.2 miles) from the Syrian town of Kobanî. The populations of both Suruç and Kobanî are mostly Kurds, with the cultural ties between the two having resulted in deadly riots in south-eastern Turkey in October 2014 when Kobanî was under siege by Islamic State militants. The riots had mainly protested the Turkish government's lack of intervention in Kobanî against ISIL. Turkish President Recep Tayyip Erdoğan claimed he was not prepared to launch operations against ISIL unless it was also against the forces of Bashar al-Assad. Furthermore, allegations of covert funding and the arming of ISIL by the Turkish government, which came under particular scrutiny following the 2014 MİT lorries scandal, also caused heavy controversy.

=== The Siege of Kobanî (2014–15) ===
Kobanî was retaken from ISIL forces in late January 2015, with the Kurdish nationalist People's Protection Units (YPG) taking full control of the city. ISIL vowed to return, committing a series of massacres in the city in June 2015. The Socialist Youth Associations Federation (SGDF) of Turkey requested permission to cross the border and participate in the reconstruction of the war-torn city.

=== Turkish invasion threats ===
During late June and early July 2015, the Turkish and Jordanian governments made threats to invade Syria and set up buffer zones.

== Explosion ==
=== Perceived targets ===
The bombing appeared to target members of the Socialist Youth Associations Federation (SGDF), the Youth Wing of the Socialist Party of the Oppressed (ESP), of which 300 members had travelled to Suruç from Istanbul in order to cross the border into Kobanî to take part in reconstruction projects there. The members were staying at the Amara Culture Centre and were giving a press statement on the reconstruction of Kobanî when the bombings took place. Shortly after the bombing in Suruç, there was an explosion at an old mortar warehouse in Kobanî.

=== Bombing ===
A survivor present at the press statement when the bombing took place, theatre actor Murat Akdağ, said that the bomb exploded in the middle of the group listening to the statement being made. Wounds on casualties taken to hospital showed evidence of burns and grenade fragments. A spokesperson for the municipality of Suruç added that there was the potential for a second bombing, asking individuals close to the Amara Cultural Centre to evacuate the area. Initial reports identified an 18-year-old female suicide bomber as the perpetrator, although the government later formally identified a male disguised as a woman as the detonator of the bomb. The Turkish government began investigating domestic and international affiliations of the suspect shortly after identification.

== Perpetrators ==
On 21 July, website Euronews reported that ISIL had claimed the attack.

On 22 July, some Turkish media reports indicated the suspected perpetrator, Şeyh Abdurrahman Alagöz, whose ID card was found at the scene, was a 20-year-old Turkish Kurd from Adıyaman who had been recruited by ISIL six months earlier.

The Kurdish nationalist Peoples' Democratic Party (HDP) however named a 20-year-old woman, whom the police had recently released from custody, as perpetrator.

Another media report pointed at Dokumacılar, an ISIL-linked terrorist group.

== Reactions ==
=== Domestic reactions ===
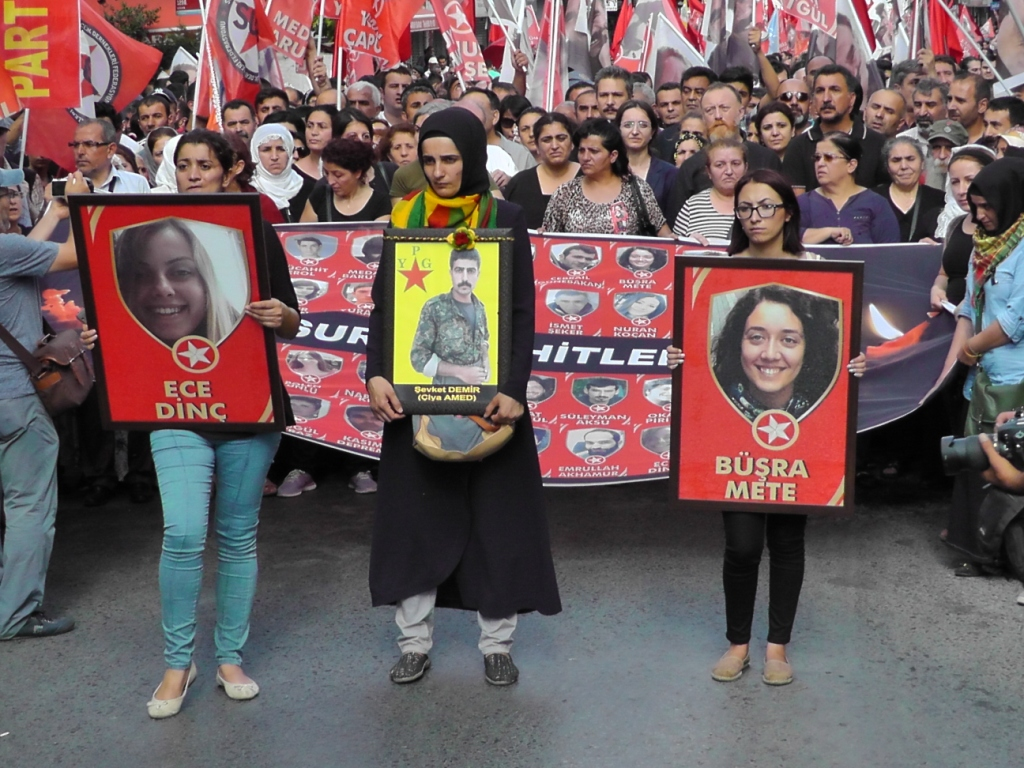
People killed by a suicide attack in Suruç

The Prime Minister of Turkey, Ahmet Davutoğlu, formed a crisis meeting and sent Deputy Prime Minister Numan Kurtulmuş, Interior Minister Sebahattin Öztürk and Minister of Labour and Social Security Faruk Çelik to Suruç to follow developments. Deputy Prime Minister Yalçın Akdoğan condemned the bombing, stating on social media that Turkey would never yield to such terrorist attacks.

The President of Turkey, Recep Tayyip Erdoğan, was in Northern Cyprus at the time of the bombing. In a statement, he condemned the attack and offered condolences to the relatives of the victims. He further claimed that government ministers would continue their investigations. Former President Abdullah Gül also condemned the attack and offered condolences.

The Governor of Şanlıurfa, İzzettin Küçük, confirmed that the explosion was a result of a suicide bombing, but caused controversy when it emerged that he had previously claimed that there was no threat from ISIL to Şanlıurfa before the bombing.

The Ministry of the Interior warned soon after the bombing occurred that casualties were likely to rise, adding that the perpetrators would be caught and brought to justice as soon as possible.

The Peoples' Democratic Party (HDP) chairman Selahattin Demirtaş claimed that the governing Justice and Development Party (AKP) were responsible for the attack, claiming the bombing could not have taken place without assistance from the state. The HDP's parliamentary group leader Pervin Buldan released a statement claiming that the HDP would treat the attacks as a suicide bombing perpetrated by ISIL until more reliable information is made available. HDP Member of Parliament Dengir Mir Mehmet Fırat claimed that the target of the attack was the Turkish Republic itself. HDP Adana Member of Parliament Meral Danış Beştaş called the attack a 'massacre' and said the HDP Central Executive Committee would meet to discuss the bombing.

The main opposition Republican People's Party (CHP) also sent a delegation to Suruç formed of ten MPs led by CHP Deputy Leader Sezgin Tanrıkulu. Another CHP Deputy Leader, Gürsel Tekin, stated that his party had consistently warned the government that the border between Syria and Turkey had been left undefended, while Tanrıkulu criticised the AKP for being responsible for Turkey's situation.

The Kurdish con-federalist Group of Communities in Kurdistan (KCK) held the AKP responsible, accusing the AKP of funding ISIL, thus contributing to its terrorist attacks and efforts. The PKK blamed the Turkish government for the attack, saying the government is conspiring with ISIL. This anger of the PKK contributed to PKK revenge attacks (see section Aftermath).

=== International reactions ===
- Armenia – Armenian President Serzh Sargsyan released a statement condemning the attack and offering condolences to the families of the dead.
- Czech Republic – The Czech Ministry of Foreign Affairs strongly condemned and extended deepest sympathy to the families of the victims. Ministry believes that perpetrators will be brought to justice.
- European Union – The European Commissioner for Enlargement and European Neighborhood Policy Johannes Hahn using his Twitter account expressed condolences to people of Suruç noting that again Syrian crisis influenced tragically neighboring countries.
- Germany – The German Minister for Foreign Affairs, Frank-Walter Steinmeier, stated that Turkey was an important partner in fighting terror and offered sympathies with the injured and relatives of the dead. He stated that the fact that the attack targeted young people was particularly horrific.
- Greece – The Youth Wing of the governing SYRIZA party of Greece released a statement stating that they would continue the work of their 32 fallen comrades.
- NATO – An Article 4 meeting was convened, leading to a denouncement of the attack, and a reassessment of Operation Active Fence.
- Northern Cyprus – The President of Northern Cyprus, Mustafa Akıncı, issued a joint press statement alongside Turkish President Recep Tayyip Erdoğan, who was visiting Northern Cyprus when the attack occurred. In his statement, Akıncı said terrorism should always be condemned, regardless of its origin or methods.
- Pakistan – The Pakistan embassy in Ankara released a statement reiterating Pakistan's unconditional condemnation for all attacks of terrorism and offered their condolences to the Turkish government and citizens of Turkey.
- Russia – Terrorist attack condemned by Russian President Vladimir Putin. Prime Minister Dmitry Medvedev expressed his condolences to relatives of the victims. Russian Federal Agency for Tourism urged Russian citizens vacationing in Turkey to remain in protected tourist areas and not to leave them for their own safety.
- Togo – Togolese President Komi Sélom Klassou. expressed his sadness at the event. Togolese citizens living in Turkey were advised to flee the area.
- United Kingdom – The British Secretary of State for Foreign and Commonwealth Affairs, Philip Hammond, issued a statement on Twitter condemning the bombing and offering his sympathies for the injured and families of those killed.
- United States – The US embassy in Ankara released a statement condemning the attack and offering condolences to the families of the dead.

== Aftermath ==
=== Demonstrations ===
VOA report about the aftermath of the bombing

Demonstrations were held in several provinces of Turkey to protest the attack. During a protest attended by approximately 1,000 people in Mersin two protestors were shot and lightly wounded by an unknown perpetrator with a hunting rifle.

=== Ceylanpınar double murder ===
Two days after the bombing in Suruç two police officers were found dead in the same building in the district of Ceylanpınar, which is also in Şanlıurfa Province. At least one of the officers was identified as working for an anti-terrorism task force. The PKK claimed responsibility for the attack, as a revenge act for the events in Suruç, but then retracted, denouncing an autonomous local initiative. 9 people were anonymously denounced and accused of the assassinations. As of 16 April 2019, the 9 accuses acquittal is upheld by the Higher Court of Turkey.

The assassinations is now commented as the casus belli used to drop the 2013–2015 Solution process, revive nationalist fervor and undo the June 2015 Turkey elections via the November 2015 Turkey elections.

=== Anti-PKK offensives ===
In raids across the country, nearly 600 terror suspects were arrested including alleged members of ISIS. However the majority of those arrested were members of non-Islamist groups such as the PKK, Revolutionary People's Liberation Party–Front and other left-wing groups.

On 24 July, Turkey for the first time carried out airstrikes against ISIS positions in Syria near the Turkish border, without entering Syrian airspace. However, the same day Turkey also began airstrikes against PKK camps in northern Iraq, despite the fact the PKK is fighting against ISIS in Iraq and Syria.

On 25 July following the airstrikes the president of Iraq's Kurdistan Regional Government, Masoud Barzani, called Prime Minister Ahmet Davutoğlu. He urged Turkey to halt its airstrikes against the PKK over their territory and resolve their problem through negotiations.

== See also ==
- 2013 Reyhanlı bombings
- 2015 Diyarbakır rally bombings
- List of terrorist incidents in 2015
- Spillover of the Syrian Civil War
- Turkey–ISIL conflict
- Turkish involvement in the Syrian Civil War
