= Dokumacılar =

Terrorist organisation linked to ISIL

Dokmacılar
- Flag of the Islamic State.
- Leaders: Abu Bakr al-Baghdadi † (as the leader of ISIL)
- Dates active: 2013 – 2017
- Country: Turkey
- Active regions: Turkish-Syrian border
- Ideology: Islamic Statism
- Status: Part of the Islamic State
- Size: Around 60–70

The Dokmacılar (lit. 'followers of [Mustafa] Dokmacılar') was a faction of the Islamic State based in Turkey that targeted the YPG and the Turkish Armed Forces which were fighting against the Islamic State in the Syrian Civil War. The organisation, thought to have been formed of around 60 militants who joined the Islamic State, was linked to both the 2015 Diyarbakır rally bombings that killed 5 people and the 2015 Suruç bombing that killed 32 people.

The Dokmacılar numbered in the 60-70s, most of whom were Turkish citizens, mostly from Adıyaman Province, who joined the Islamic State. The group allegedly participated in the unsuccessful fight against the YPG forces during the offensive against the town of Tell Abyad in Syria. Since 2017, the group has been inactive.

== Formation ==
The Dokumacılar are allegedly formed by around 60 or 70 Turkish citizens from Adıyaman Province, who crossed the Turkish-Syrian border to receive training in ISIL camps. The group also allegedly had links with Turkish customs officials at border gates on the border.

== Alleged attacks ==
=== Offensive on Tell Abyad ===
Reports claim that the Dokumacılar were part of the ISIL offensive against the Syrian city of Tell Abyad in 2015, where the group allegedly suffered heavy casualties. The group's military commander was reported to have been killed by Kurdish People's Protection Units (YPG) fighters during the offensive, with the final YPG victory against ISIL's military forces causing the Dokumacılar to retreat and cross the border back into Turkey.

=== HDP Diyarbakır rally bombings ===
During an electoral rally held in Diyarbakır by the pro-Kurdish Peoples' Democratic Party (HDP) just 48 hours before the Turkish general election of June 2015, two bombs exploded just before the party chairman Selahattin Demirtaş was about to make a speech. The attack killed 4 people and injured over 100 more, with the HDP accusing ISIL of the bombing. Later reports and allegations in July 2015 pointed towards the involvement of the Dokumacılar, with whom the bombings' prime suspect Orhan Gönder was allegedly a member.

=== 2015 Suruç bombing ===
On 20 July 2015, a suicide bombing in the Turkish district of Suruç, Şanlıurfa Province resulted in the death of 32 young activists who were planning to cross the border to help the relief efforts in the Syrian town of Kobanî. Kobanî had, until recently, been under siege by ISIL forces, though the YPG had gained control over most of the city by mid 2015. The youth activists were listening to a press statement when the explosion occurred, with the perpetrator being identified as Şeyh Abdurrahman Alagöz, who had entered Syria at the same time as Orhan Gönder to receive training in ISIL-led camps. The two were thus alleged to have been part of the Dokumacılar organisation.

== See also ==
- Turkish–Islamic State conflict
- Spillover of the Syrian Civil War
- Military activities of ISIL
