= Ceylanpınar =

- District and municipality
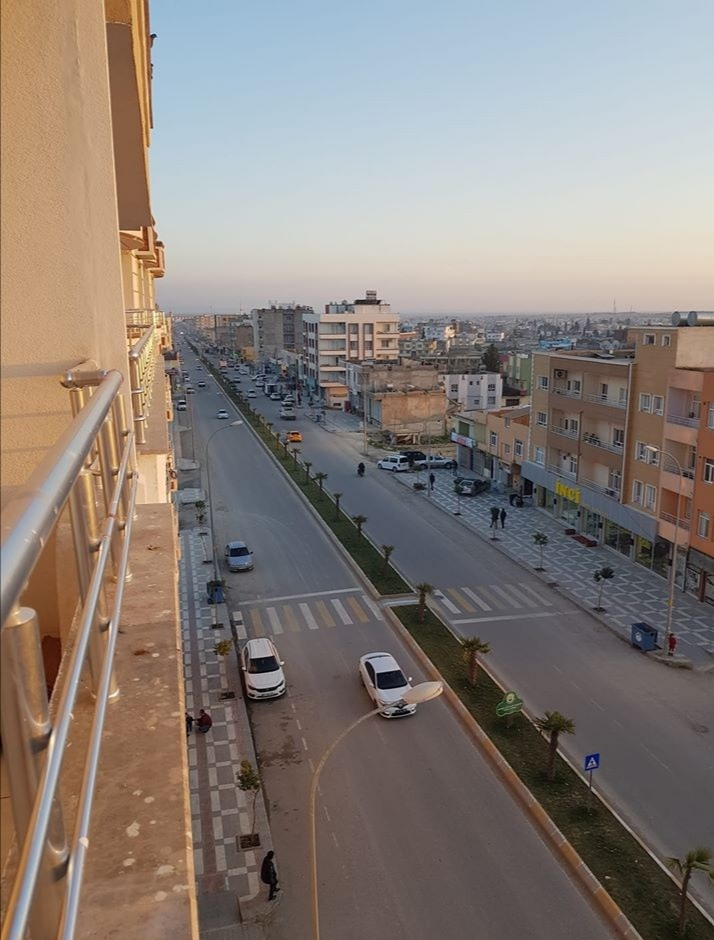
- A view of Ceylanpınar

- Logo

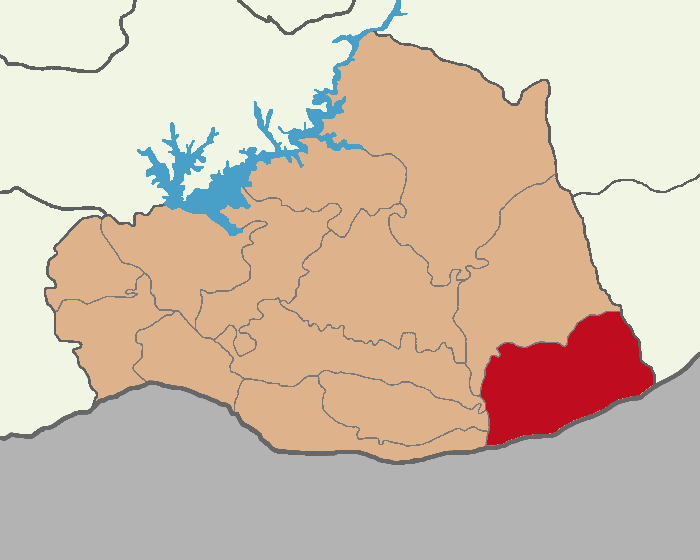
- Map showing Ceylanpınar District in Şanlıurfa Province

- Location within Turkey Location within Şanlıurfa
- Coordinates: 36°50′46″N 40°02′56″E
- Country: Turkey
- Province: Şanlıurfa

Government
  - Mayor: Feyyaz Soylu (AKP)
- Area: 1,589 km^{2} (614 sq mi)
- Population (2022): 90,440
  - Density: 56.92/km^{2} (147.4/sq mi)
- Time zone: UTC+3 (TRT)
- Postal code: 63570
- Area code: 0414
- Website: www.ceylanpinar.bel.tr

Ceylanpınar (Kurdish: Serêkaniyê, Arabic: رأس العين Ra's al 'Ayn, Ottoman Turkish: رأس العين Resülayn) is a municipality and district of Şanlıurfa Province, Turkey. Its area is 1,589 km^{2}, and its population is 90,440 (2022). On the border with Syria, it is reached by a long straight road D.905 across the plain south from Viranşehir. It forms a divided city with Ra's al-'Ayn in Syria and there is a border crossing.

== Composition ==
There are 52 neighbourhoods in Ceylanpınar District:

- 15 Temmuz
- Adnan Menderes
- Akbulut
- Aktepe
- Alaca
- Altınköy
- Aşağıdoruklu
- Aşağıdurmuş
- Aşağıkarataş
- Avcılı
- Aydın
- Aydoğdu
- Bahçelievler
- Boğalı
- Büyükçaylı
- Büyükyenice
- Büyükyıldız
- Ceylan
- Cumhuriyet
- Damlacık
- Dikili
- Düzova
- Ensar
- Fatih Sultan Mehmet
- Gellegöç
- Gültepe
- Gümüş
- Han
- Işıklar
- Maden
- Mehmet Akif Ersoy
- Mevlana
- Muratlı
- Özbek
- Saraççeşme
- Selahaddin Eyyübi
- Seydo Atilla
- Sufra
- Tekinler
- Turgut Özal
- Ulucami
- Yalçınkaya
- Yeniköy
- Yenişehir
- Yeşiltepe
- Yoncalı
- Yukarı Doruklu
- Yukarı Durmuş
- Yukarı Esence
- Yukarı Karataş
- Yukarı Taşlıdere
- Yüksektepe

== Immigration ==
Evren Paşa neighborhood is populated by Uzbeks, who are Afghan refugees.

== Climate ==
Ceylanpınar has a hot semi-arid climate (Köppen climate classification: BSh). Summers are extremely hot with virtually no rain at all, winters tend to be cool but can become very cold due to northeasterly winds.

Climate data for Ceylanpınar (1991–2020)
Month	Jan	Feb	Mar	Apr	May	Jun	Jul	Aug	Sep	Oct	Nov	Dec	Year
Mean daily maximum °C (°F)	11.5 (52.7)	13.8 (56.8)	18.7 (65.7)	24.3 (75.7)	31.0 (87.8)	37.5 (99.5)	41.1 (106.0)	40.5 (104.9)	36.1 (97.0)	29.3 (84.7)	20.2 (68.4)	13.4 (56.1)	26.5 (79.7)
Daily mean °C (°F)	5.6 (42.1)	7.4 (45.3)	11.5 (52.7)	16.6 (61.9)	22.7 (72.9)	29.0 (84.2)	32.2 (90.0)	31.2 (88.2)	26.6 (79.9)	20.2 (68.4)	12.4 (54.3)	7.2 (45.0)	18.6 (65.5)
Mean daily minimum °C (°F)	0.9 (33.6)	1.9 (35.4)	4.9 (40.8)	9.0 (48.2)	14.0 (57.2)	19.1 (66.4)	22.2 (72.0)	21.2 (70.2)	16.8 (62.2)	11.9 (53.4)	5.8 (42.4)	2.3 (36.1)	10.9 (51.6)
Average precipitation mm (inches)	44.65 (1.76)	40.79 (1.61)	37.84 (1.49)	33.92 (1.34)	21.01 (0.83)	1.67 (0.07)	0.04 (0.00)	0.19 (0.01)	1.89 (0.07)	19.71 (0.78)	28.36 (1.12)	39.21 (1.54)	269.28 (10.60)
Average precipitation days (≥ 1.0 mm)	6.9	6.3	5.6	4.8	3.1	1.1	0.0	1.0	1.5	2.5	3.9	6.0	42.7
Average relative humidity (%)	73.3	69.1	64.2	59.5	47.1	32.8	32.4	35.2	36.8	46.2	62.1	73.0	52.8
Source: NOAA
