= Turkish winter campaign of 1994–1995 =

Turkish military operation

Winter campaign of 1994–1995
- Part of the Kurdish–Turkish conflict
| Date | November 1994 – March 1995 |
| Location | Southeastern Turkey |
| Result | Turkish victory: PKK presence heavily destroyed in Turkey; PKK flees from Turkey and moves most of their forces into Iraqi Kurdistan. |

Belligerents
| (Turkey) Turkish Armed Forces | Kurdistan Workers Party (PKK) |

Commanders and leaders
| (Turkey) İsmail Hakkı Karadayı (Turkey) Aydın İlter (Turkey) Halis Burhan | Abdullah Öcalan |

Strength
| (Turkey) 150,000+ troops | 30,000+ militants |

Casualties and losses
| (Turkey) 173 security forces killed | 6,000+ militants killed |

In November 1994, the Turkish military launched a winter campaign in South-Eastern and Eastern Turkey to cut rebels from the Kurdistan Workers' Party (PKK), who were active in the region, off from their winter supplies. The campaign continued until March 20, 1995, when the Turkish government launched an offensive into Iraqi Kurdistan to dislodge the PKK from its bases before the spring.

== See also ==
- Operation Steel
- Operation Claw-Eagle 2
- 2015 Hakkari assault
- Operations Claw-Eagle and Tiger
- Silvan ambush
- Sazak assault
- 2018 Siirt raid
