= Free Women's Units =

Kurdistan Workers' Party feminist military wing

Free Women's Units Yekîneyên Jinên Azad ên Star (YJA STAR)
- Dates active: 2004–2025
- Active regions: Turkish, Iraqi, Syrian, and Iranian Kurdistan
- Ideology: Democratic confederalism: Jineology; Libertarian socialism; Communalism
- Status: Kurdish–Turkish conflict (2015–2025)
- Website: www.yjastar.com

Former flag of the YJA STAR

The Free Women's Units (Kurdish: Yekîneyên Jinên Azad ên Star), shortened from the Kurdish name as YJA STAR, was the women's military wing of the Kurdistan Workers' Party (PKK). YJA STAR operates according to jineology, the feminist philosophy developed by the Kurdish ideological leader, Abdullah Öcalan.

On 12 May 2025, the Kurdistan Workers' Party announced it would disband as part of a peace initiative with Turkey.

== See also ==
- Gulîstan, Land of Roses, a 2016 documentary film about women PKK fighters
