= Civil Protection Units =

Militia in Turkey

Civil Protection Units (YPS)
- Yekîneyên Parastina Sivîl (YPS)
- Flag of the YPS
- Active: 20 December 2015 – 12 May 2025
- Country: Turkey
- Type: Light infantry militia
- Size: 12,000–20,000
- Part of: Kurdistan Communities Union
- Engagements: Kurdish–Turkish conflict; Kurdish–Turkish conflict; 2015–16 Şırnak clashes

The Civil Protection Units (Kurdish: Yekîneyên Parastina Sivîl, pronounced [jɛkinɛjen parastɪna sɪvil]; YPS), also known as Civil Defense Units, was a primarily Kurdish rebel group and main armed force in Turkish Kurdistan. The YPS was formed by the Kurdistan Workers Party (PKK) to better organize and train the youth fighters in the Patriotic Revolutionary Youth Movement, otherwise known as the YDG-H. In 2015 the YDG-H reorganized themselves in to what is known as the YPS today.

On 12 May 2025, the Kurdistan Workers' Party announced it would disband as part of a peace initiative with Turkey.

== History ==
It was claimed that the YPS was originally formed on 20 December 2015 by the Kurdish rebels as a version of the YPG in Northern Kurdistan (Turkey). A youth wing of the PKK, is the YDG-H, which in 2015 reorganized itself into what is known as the YPS of today. The YPS is mainly composed of members of the former YDG-H, who have been operating since 2013. The YPS is currently training for conventional urban warfare against the Turkish government; previous Kurdish rebel groups have followed predominantly guerilla tactics of warfare, however the new method of warfare seen in the Kurdish-Turkish conflict has led to speculation of civil war in Turkey.

The YPS initially took a defensive posture in the Kurdish-Turkish conflict (1978-present) and has become a major opponent of the Turkish army (TSK) and Turkish government and has co-operated with Kurdish opposition fighters against TSK. Multiple branches of the YPS have been formed in Kurdish districts in Turkey, usually as a result of clashes or curfews imposed by the Turkish government. Such branches are in Nusaybin, Sirnak, Sur, and Yüksekova (also known as Gever).

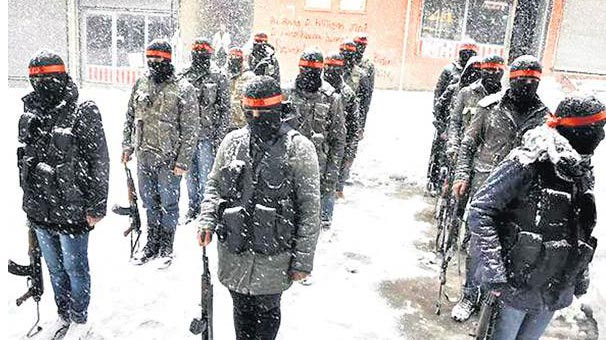
YPS Members in the Snow

There is also a female branch of the YPS known as the YPS-Jin that was founded in 2016 one year after the initial YPS foundation, one of the causes which they fight for is gender equality. Some members of the YPS-Jin were also once victims of ISIS during the Yazidi genocide that took place in 2014. Women who were once victims of ISIS, whether it be they were sold into the sex slave industry or their family was murdered, joined the ranks of YPS and YPS-Jin to avenge the victims of the Yazidis genocide.

=== YDG-H ===
The YDG-H is the group that YPS was formed from. The YDG-H is the youth branch of the PKK resistance movement and was trained for urban guerrilla warfare tactics. Before the creation of YDG-H there were very little resistance forces that were actively fighting within city limits, which led to the creation of the YDG-H. In the past, youths were afraid of the Turkish State, however, now they have joined the fight against them. The ages of the YDG-H ranged from 15 to 25 years old, making them more radicalized and less likely for an open dialogue between them and Turkey. A popular quote from a former Kurdish politician by the name of Serafettin Elci, said, "we are the last generation you are going to negotiate with. After us, you will confront an angry youth that has grown up in war.” In 2015, the YDG-H formed into what is now the YPS.

== YPS-Jin ==
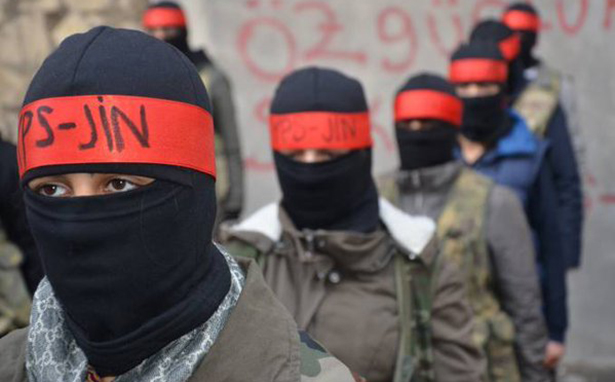
YPS-Jin members standing in formation

A strong push for the YPS-Jin to form was the call for feminists to take a stand. The curfews imposed on certain districts in Turkey made it very difficult for mothers and women to go out into the streets without fear of being killed. In instances, women are leaving their homes to go in search for food for their families only to be used as targets for snipers, regardless or not if they are waving a white flag showing they mean no harm and are no threat. The Turkish Government also acknowledged that they do not support or recognize gender equality and the struggles that women face during the war efforts, since many issues regarding women are put on the back burner even inside their own resistance movements due to the male dominance. The YPS-Jin fights along with the YPS, however, they just have more of a focus on women's issues than the YPS.The Civil Protection Units-Women or Civil Defense Units-Women (Kurdish: Yekîneyên Parastina Sivîl a Jin, YPS-Jin) is a Kurdish militia that was set up in 2016 as the female brigade of the YPS (Yekîneyên Parastina Sivîl, YPS) militia. Jin meaning woman in Kurdish, the main purpose of the YPS-Jin is to fight for women's liberation and freedom alongside the fight for Kurdish freedom. In 2016, YPS-Jin became established in Yüksekova, formerly known as Gever to fight against the Turkish forces in the area. This is because the residents in the area declared autonomy from the Turkish government and the YPS-Jin established there to protect this newly found autonomy and defend against any state-sanctioned attacks in the region. The YPS-Jin protected the signing of the declaration of autonomy in Yüksekova, saying that life will be either free or not exist at all.

Flag of YPS-J

== Differences with the Kurdistan Workers Party (PKK) ==
The YDG-H was the youth portion of the militant wing of the Kurdistan Workers Party (PKK) mostly between 15 and 25 years old. Former members of the YDG-H are often found to be part of the YPS today since the YDG-H reorganized themselves as the YPS and share differences between the commands in the PKK. One main difference from the PKK, is the willingness to negotiate and compromise with Turkish officials even with high casualty rates. This has shown how YPS and YPS-Jin members show that they are not afraid to die, which can be a result of growing up in conflict and becoming traumatized at a young age. Unlike the PKK, the YPS does not have a strong hierarchy when it comes to decisions, however, YPS method of discipline is independent cells operating on their own ambition. YPS fighters are also most commonly trained by the YPG which allowed them to be more careful in planning ambushed and roadside bombings, it is also speculated that they are exposed to ISIS tactics in these changes in fighting.

== Recruitment efforts ==
The YPS is the reorganized branch of the youth wing in the Kurdistan Workers' Party (PKK). In the Şırnak's Cizre district, many students are joining the ranks of YPS-Jin. This is in part due to the ongoing conflict with the Turkish government's role in terrorizing the Kurdish people in the region . The YPS called upon all students, youths, and women to join the YPS and YPS-Jin in the fight against the Turkish government.

The YPS calls on everyone who can join to do so and that everyone should be a part of the growing movement. YPS calls on everyone who is affected by the Turkish state, whether it be curfews, occupation, or both, to join them to defend themselves against the oppression of the Turkish government. The YPS calls on young men and women to join their ranks to defend their towns. A popular phrase that the YPS uses is "Bijî berxwedana gelê Kurd", which means "long live the resistance of the Kurdish people". The YPS believes that now is the time to fight for one's freedoms and not doing so will only give power to the state. Any youth who has the call for revolution is urged to join the YPS, said one YPS commander in an interview.

== Branches ==
=== Nisebîn (Nusaybin) ===
Nusaybin is a city in Turkey on the border of Syria, the city is a stronghold in the Kurdish resistance against Turkey. In Nusaybin the Turkish Government imposed a curfew on its citizens on March 14 in an effort to combat the growing resistance movements in Turkey and after the curfew was lifted much of what was left of the district was unrecognizable. The YPS used barricades to block Turkish police from entering the city and many of the people walking the streets were carrying weapons. Roads were destroyed to make barricades, holes in walls between buildings were created to allow YPS members to move from place to place to be undetected and tunnels were dug. On March 13, 2016, the Turkish army surrounded Nusaybin with tanks in an attempt to drive out resistance fighters. The fight between the YPS and Turkey did not seem to have an end in sight when it came to Nusaybin. This eventually led to the YPS withdrawing from Nusaybin in an effort to better protect the civilians inside the city limits. There were hundreds of casualties in Nusaybin, which is what eventually led the YPS to withdraw, to avoid any possible further massacres of innocents, who they fight to protect.

=== Şirnex (Şırnak) ===
Şırnak is a town in Turkey near the border of Iraq and Syria. In July 2015, Turkey bombed Şırnak which ended up killing PKK officials and the conflict and violence just grew from there. Many other bombings and killings of resistance fighters and Turkish police followed suit. In January 2016, the YPS commander in Şırnak released a statement bashing Kurds who do not take part in the resistance against Turkey and do not support the YPS. Like Nusaybin, Şırnak also had a curfew placed on it and like Nusaybin, there were barricades made from road rubble. Between March 14 and November 14 of 2016 the people of Şırnak are allowed to go home only between the hours of 5:00 a.m. and 10:00 p.m. This partial curfew is in place to clean up the pot holes and barricades left by resistance movements, says Turkish officials, which was referred to as Martyr Gendarmerie Lieutenant Mehmet Çiftçi. After this clean up it was discovered approximately 508 militants were killed and 1,845 bombs were set off in Şırnak during the peak of the conflict. Also, 39 pits that were used to create barricades were filled and over 200 barricades were demolished.

=== Sur (Sur) ===
Sur is in the district of Diyarbakır province in Eastern Turkey. In July 2015, homes, churches, and mosques were all under threat from Turkish police making it almost impossible for those who once lived there to return. Many people speculated the reason for the conflict in this region was the Turkish State's desire to turn Sur into a tourist destination, which would begin with making it financially impossible for locals to live there. The fighting and oppression on the civilians only increased from here. After a failed cease-fire in 2015, Turkish police reinstated curfews in many district across Turkey, this led people flee to Sur, since it is newly established without a curfew. This made the YPS declare Sur as an autonomous zone. Between December and March 2015, the Turkish Army sent in tanks, helicopters, and guns to take back control from resistance fighters. Turkish officials blame the start of the fighting in this district on the YPS. Turkish officials cited YPS as attempting to take control of the region and referring to them as a terrorist group. The YPS set up barricades, roadblocks, checkpoints, and trenches to keep out the Turkish Government. The YPS was also armed with machine guns, RPGs, and explosives. The Turkish government responded with curfews which only led to bloody and violent conflict between the two groups. In March 2016, the region was considered clear by the Turkish government, the curfew was lifted, and 279 resistance fighters were killed, including the youngest who was a 13-year-old girl.

=== Gever (Yüksekova) ===
Yüksekova is located in South East Turkey towards the Iran and Iraq border. Like Sur, Sirnak, and Nusaybin, Yüksekova is not very different. The Turkish Army regularly patrols areas of Yüksekova in armored vehicles and tanks in an effort to secure the area from resistance fighters. In this particular area there have been instances of the YPS killing Turkish police in what they explain as an eye for an eye. On October 8, 2016, four civilians were killed in Yüksekova, this made the YPS retaliate by ambushing an armored vehicle containing four Turkish forces officials, all of which were killed by the YPS. This is not the only instance were ambushed on Turkish police have happened in Yüksekova. On September 11, 2016, YPS members in the district of Cumhuriyet, in Yüksekova, ambushed a police checkpoint which resulted in the death of four Turkish police officers.

== Turkey's Response ==
Turkey had labeled the YPS as a terrorist organizations. As such, any time the YPS develops a stronghold in a district such as Nusaybin, Sirnak, Sur, or Gever the Turkish Army is there to push back. In many cases where YPS set up barricades, Turkey met them with equal if not more power such as tanks, automatic machine guns, and helicopters with gun mounts. In some instances even surrounding the entire district with tanks for no one can escape, and if anyone is caught trying to they will be shot. President Erdogan has said on multiple occasions that there is no Kurdish problem, only a terrorist problem and he will not stop until he defeats every last one of them.

In instances where a family's child has been killed, who was in the ranks of YPS, they are not likely permitted to see the bodies. In one case a young 17-year-old girl left to join the YPS, however, she never returned home. She was killed in a firefight with the Turkish Army. Since she and the others were labeled as terrorists by Turkey, Turkey did not show any sense of compassion for them. In the instance of this case, the government allowed the families to enter the districts where their children are lying dead, however, they make it nearly impossible for the families to bury their children.

== See also ==
- People's Protection Units (YPG)
- Kurdistan Workers' Party (PKK)
