= August 2016 Van attack =

Bomb attack on the Iki Nisan police headquarters in Van city center on 17 August 2016

- Part of Kurdish–Turkish conflict (2015–present)
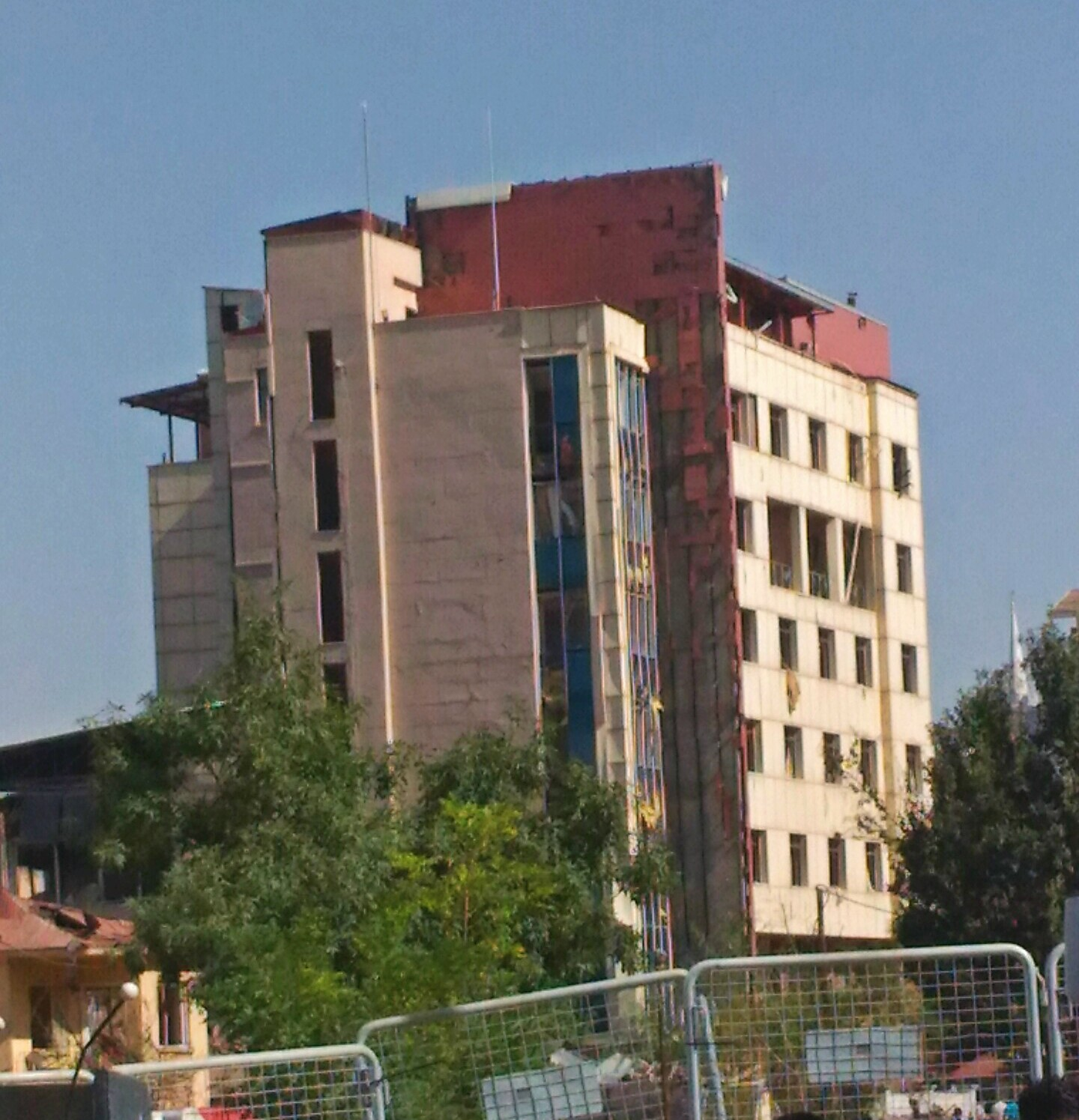
- After the attack, the Iki Nisan Police Station building
- Location: Van, Turkey
- Date: 17 August 2016; 23:15
- Target: Police Station
- Attack type: Car bombing
- Weapon: Bomb
- Deaths: 4
- Injuries: 72
- Perpetrator: PKK

August 17, 2016 Van attack, a bomb attack on the Iki Nisan police headquarters in Van city center on 17 August 2016.

== Attack ==
A car bomb was detonated near the building by a PKK member at 23:15 in front of the Iki Nisan Police Station on Sıhke Street in the central İpekyolu District of Van. A total of 4 people, 2 of whom were police officers, lost their lives in the attack, and 72 people, 20 of whom were police officers, were injured. The surrounding buildings were also damaged in the attack.
