= YDG-H =

Former youth wing of the Kurdistan Workers' Party

Patriotic Revolutionary Youth Movement
- Yurtsever Devrimci Gençlik Hareketi (YDG-H); Tevgera Ciwanen Welatparêzên Şoreşger
- Flag of the YDG-H
- Founded: 2006
- Dates active: 2012–2015
- Country: Turkey
- Active regions: Southeastern Anatolia Region (Turkey)
- Ideology: Democratic confederalism Autonomy; Kurdish Nationalism
- Size: 8,000–15,000

The Patriotic Revolutionary Youth Movement (Kurdish: Tevgera Ciwanen Welatparêzên Şoreşger, Turkish: Yurtsever Devrimci Gençlik Hareket, YDG-H) was the urban, militant youth wing of the Kurdistan Workers' Party (PKK) from 2006-2015. Trained by more experienced PKK cadres for urban fighting, and consisting mostly of children and adults in the 15-25 age group. Although some members and local supporters denied any affiliation with the PKK, observers argued that this was unlikely given the type of weaponry they possessed. According to French journalist Mattheiu Delmas their fighters “are all young people; a new generation of guerrilla fighters who grew up with Syria war and became cultured with the fight in Kobane.”

The group started to clash with Turkish security forces and tried to enforce their authority in the areas they were located in 2014 as part of a strategy which involved unilateral declaration of self-management in various towns in southeastern Turkey, and creation of trenches and barricades reinforced with IEDs and explosives to deny security forces access.

The group was in favor of regional self-management for the Kurdish people in Southeast Anatolia. Other claimed objectives of the YDG-H include stopping all activities related to drugs and prostitution, and other similar crimes in the region.

In December 2015, the YDG-H was reorganized into the Civil Protection Units (YPS) militia.

== Gallery ==
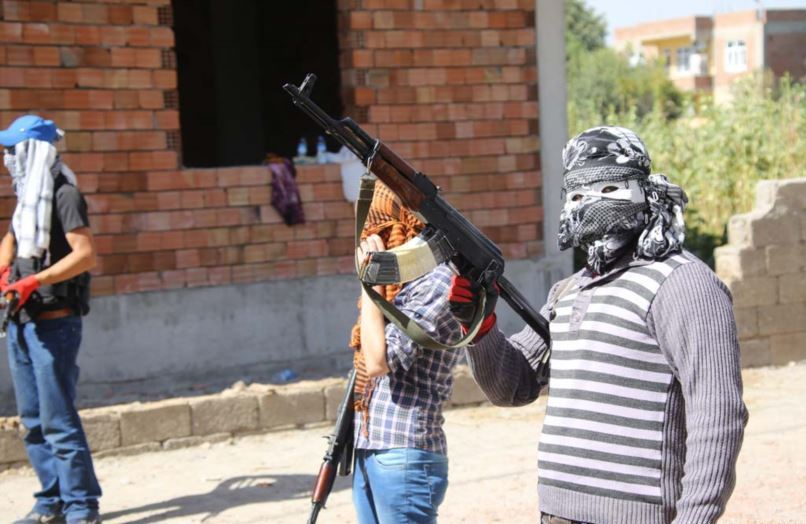
Armed YDG-H members in Cizre.

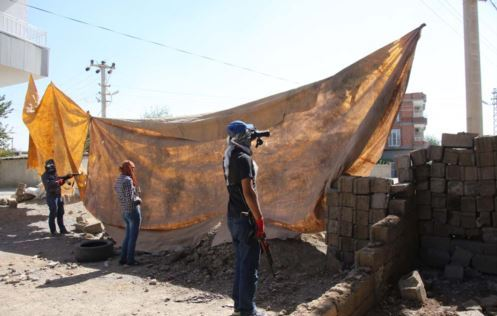
YDG-H behind barricades.

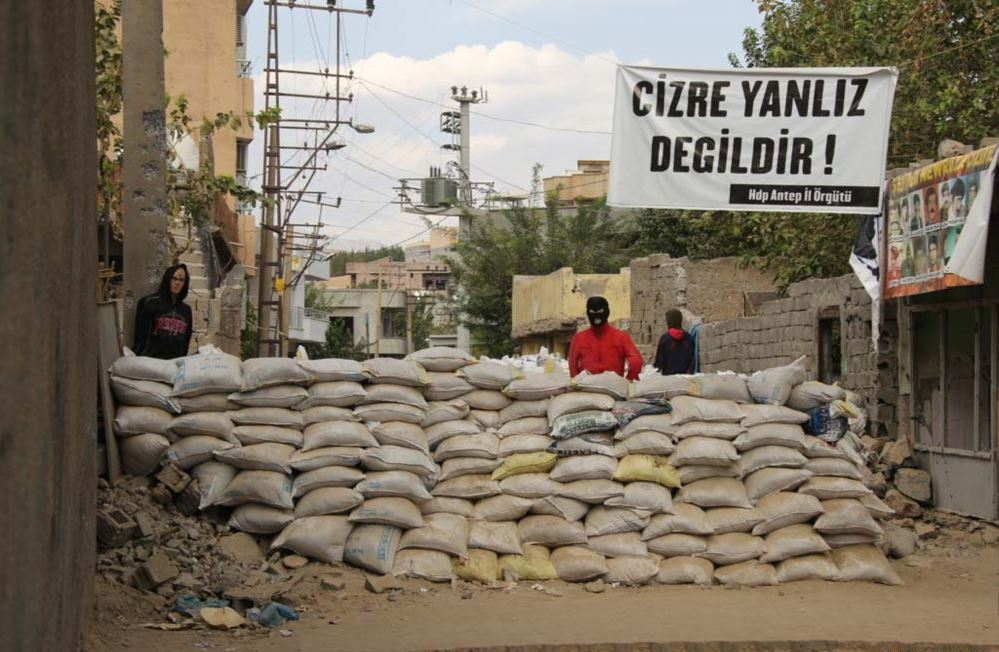
YDG-H members in Sirnak.

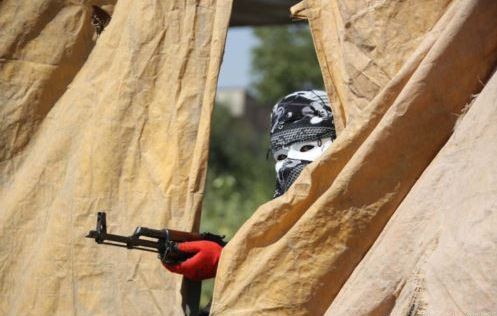
YDG-H member peaking from behind a curtain.

== See also ==
- People's Protection Units (YPG)
