= 2015 Hakkari assault =

Turkish operation against the PKK

June–2015 South-Eastern Hakkari assault
- Part of Kurdish–Turkish conflict (2015–present)
Date	Phases: September–November 2015 (duration of assault); July–September 2015 (duration of limited scale operations)
Location	Hakkâri Province, Turkey
Result	Turkish victory: Successful operation.

Belligerents
Turkey	Kurdistan Workers' Party (PKK)

Casualties and losses
6 killed	119 killed

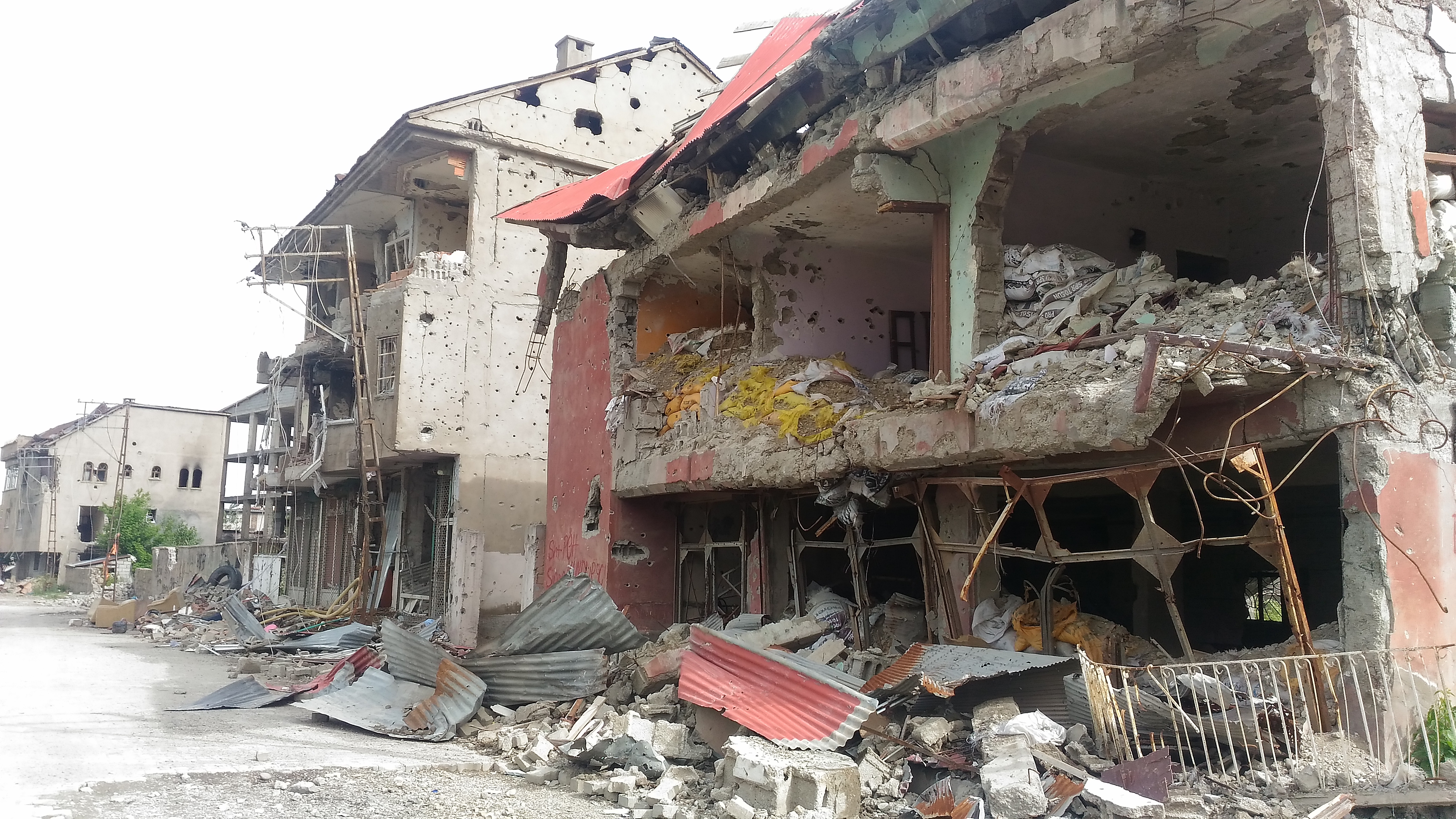
2015 Hakkari assault

2015 South-Western Hakkari assault refers to a large-scale operation of the Turkish military against Kurdish insurgents in the mountains of south-eastern Turkey, within the frame of the Kurdish–Turkish conflict resulting in the elimination of the Kurdistan Workers' Party (PKK) mountain force structure network resulting in 119 militants killed and an estimated thousands of militants retreating to Iraq. The large scale assault was launched early September 2015 by the Turkish Army commando battalions and concluded in early November 2015.

== Timeline ==
According to Turkish sources, on 5 November 2015, the military killed at least 31 PKK militants in ongoing security operations in Turkey's southeastern Hakkari province within 24 hours. According to statements posted on the Turkish General Staff website, the military killed 15 PKK on Wednesday and another 16 members of the organization on Thursday in ongoing security operations in Hakkari province's Yüksekova district.

Anadolu Agency reported local Turkish army sources as saying that the operation in Hakkari lasted from September 27 to November 5 and targeted PKK mountain hideouts, seizing or destroying anti-aircraft guns and other heavy weapons. Troops also destroyed 18 handmade bunkers and an ammunition cache used by the Kurdish militants, an army statement said.

== Casualties ==
Turkey announced that during the operation, 119 PKK militants were killed and anti-aircraft guns were seized. 6 Turkish soldiers were killed during the operation.
