= Gendarmerie Special Operations =

Special operations arm of the Turkish Gendarmerie General Command

- Active: 1991–1993 (Gendarmerie Commando "A" Teams), 1993-1999 (Gendarmerie Special Operations Groups) 1999–present (Gendarmerie Special Operations)
- Country: Turkey
- Branch: Gendarmerie General Command
- Type: Special forces
- Garrison/HQ: Ankara Güvercinlik
- Nickname: JÖH'ler
- Mottos: Shining Honor and Glory on Our Forehead
- Colors: Gold and black
- Mascot: Anatolian leopard
- Engagements: Kurdish–Turkish conflict (1978–present) Operation Steel Operation Dawn (1997) Operation Sun Operation Shah Euphrates Operation Euphrates Shield Operation Olive Branch Operation Claw (2019-2020) Operation Peace Spring

The Gendarmerie Special Operations (Turkish: Jandarma Özel Harekat) or JÖH, is the special operations unit of the Turkish Gendarmerie General Command. Its tasks include search and destroy, infiltration, and reconnaissance. Members of the unit receive extensive training at the Jandarma School at Foça and also from selected Turkish Armed Forces instructors. All three of its companies work under the direction of the army regions to which they are assigned, but can also receive tasking from their headquarters in Ankara.

== About ==
The GSO was established in 1991, at the height of the Turkish–Kurdish conflict. It has recently been involved in the Turkish occupation of northern Syria. Unit members are in the 16-week training rooms at the Gendarmerie Commando Terrorist Operations School Command in Foça. All kinds of light weapons, mortar use, rocket launcher training, maneuvering under fire, destroying targets, mountaineering, GPS, long distance navigation, camouflage, being able to withstand fatigue and insomnia, making the right decision under stress, adaptation to different climate and geographical situations, fighting in urban areas, explosive recognition and detection, helicopter evacuation, basic helicopter steering, transition through waterways, basic diving, melee combat, survival, boat operations. A person who completes the course becomes a commando. Commando candidates run 300+ kilometers, walk more than 1100+ kilometers and stay in the field for 61 nights. Trainees are expected to complete a 10 kilometer rifle run, a 15 kilometer country run, and a 30 kilometer strength run with full equipment. After the commando training, a sniper course is followed. The Gendarmerie Special Operations course lasts 6 months. The course is organized in Ankara, İzmir and Kayseri with land, air and sea phases. Gendarmerie officers, non-commissioned officers and experts who have received basic gendarmerie commando training can attend the course. Combat training in severe cold in Kayseri or Bolu Basic diving in Ankara In İzmir Foça, the helicopter jump boat operator receives training such as close combat, forestry, airplane-bus-train operations, residential operation, frogman, special operations and Paratrooper. Special operations candidates ran a total of 675+ kilometers under running conditions. At the end of the training, the student will have the ability to plan and conduct special operations in buildings, land, air and railway vehicles in all kinds of terrain and climatic conditions at home and abroad.

In Combat Physical Education classes, basic movements such as pull-ups, sit-ups and push-ups are performed. In addition, a training simulation called TAKSİS is conducted by TÜBİTAK. Has at least 20,000 active personnel. JÖHs are like the equivalent of maroon berets in the Turkish Armed Forces.

== Units ==
Unit	Province	Nick Name's	Details
Hançerler JÖH	Adıyaman	Hançerler (Daggers)	Badge
Mertler JÖH	Ağrı	Mertler (Braves)	Symbols/ badge of unit is double-headed Anatholian Eagle(Seljuk) located behind Mount Ararat.
Atmacalar JÖH	Batman, Turkey	Atmacalar (sparrow hawks)	
Kartallar JÖH	Bingöl	Kartallar (Eagles)	Badge
Roketler JÖH	Diyarbakır	Roketler (Rockets)	Badge
Serdarlar JÖH	Elazığ	Serdarlar (Serdar means commander in Ottoman Turkish language)	Badge
Çelikler JÖH	Erzurum	Çelikler (Steels)	takes its name from Operation Steel. most of the commanders from 25th Mechanized Infantry Brigade Badge
Doğanlar JÖH	Giresun	Doğanlar (Falcons)	Gendarmerie Chief Sergeant Ferhat Gedik killed together with Eren Bülbül (aged 15) as a result of an attack by PKK were a member of this unit. This unit is out of Kurdish–Turkish conflict (1978–present) zone and takes place in Black Sea Forest region. The reason behind for being outside of the conflict area is Revolutionary People's Liberation Party/Front or DHKP-C Insurgency
Fatihler JÖH	Hakkari	Fatihler (Conquerors)	Badge
Efeler JÖH	Hakkâri Province - Yüksekova	Efeler (Efe (zeybek)) There is EfeMonument in Barracks	First unit commit the counter offensive October 2007 clashes in Hakkâri Badge :
Parslar JÖH	Hakkâri Province Şemdinli	Parslar (Anatolian leopards)	
Arslanlar JÖH	Hatay Province	Arslanlar (Lions)	Newly formed unit since begin of Syrian Civil War to protect the border &Amanos Mountains. Also took place in Operation Olive Branch(closest unit in region)
Kafkaslar JÖH	Kars	Kafkaslar (Caucasus Mountains)	
Yiğitler JÖH	Mardin Province	Yiğitler (Ironsides)	One of the first unit. symbol on Badge is Akinji
Kılıçlar JÖH	Muş Province	Kılıçlar (Kilijs)	
Dadaşlar JÖH	Siirt Province	Dadaş (Valiants)	Badge Old Badge
Bozkır Kartalları JÖH	Sivas Province	Kartallar (Steppe eagles)	
Meteler JÖH	Şırnak	Meteler(Modu Chanyu)	Badge
Korkutlar JÖH	Osmaniye	Korkut (name)	Badge
Oğuzlar & Yıldırımlar JÖH	Van, Turkey	Oḡuz Khan Yildirim Bayazit	Badge
Panterler JÖH	Tatvan Bitlis	Leopard's	Badge
Boralar JÖH	Tokat	Bora means (Strong wind)	Badge
Şahinler JÖH	Tunceli	Buteo's	Badge
Timsahlar JÖH	Bursa	Crocodile	Badge
Avcılar JÖH	İzmir	Hunters	Badge
Tayfunlar JÖH	Antalya, Akseki	Typhoons	-
