= List of Turkish operations in northern Iraq =

Turkish operations in Northern Iraq
- Part of the Kurdish–Turkish conflict; Iraqi Kurdish Civil War
- Current military situation: Controlled by the Federal Government Controlled by the Kurdistan Region Controlled by the Turkish Armed Forces
Date	1983–2025
Location	Kurdistan Region, Iraq
Result	PKK dissolves on 12 May 2025 as part of the 2025 PKK–Turkey peace process

Belligerents
Turkey Previous: KDP (1992, 1995, 1997) PUK (1992)	PKK; YBŞ; PJAK; YJA STAR Previous: PUK (1997)

Casualties and losses
400+ killed	8,000+ killed 1,700 captured
- 6,800+ displaced

The Kurdish-Turkish conflict spilled over into Iraqi Kurdistan in 1983, and has continued there intermittently since. The Turkish Armed Forces has launched a series of operations in Northern Iraq against the Kurdistan Workers' Party (PKK). More than 37,000 people have been killed in the conflict since 1984.

== List of operations ==
The operations resulted in a permanent Turkish presence in northern Iraq since 2018. The Iraqi government at one time viewed these operations as a violation of Iraq's sovereignty, with President Barham Salih demanding from Turkey their end, and the withdrawal of all of the Turkish armed forces from his country's territory.

Date	Operation	TAF Fatalities (Wounded)	PKK Fatalities (Captured)
27 May 1984 – 10 October 1984	Operation Hot Pursuit	?	?
5 October 1992 – 15 November 1992	Operation Northern Iraq	28 (125)	1,551 (1,232)
20 March 1995 – 4 May 1995	Operation Steel	64 (185)	555 (13)
12 May 1997 – 7 July 1997	Operation Hammer	114 (338)	2,730 (418)
25 September 1997 – 15 October 1997	Operation Dawn	31 (91)	865 (37)
21 February 2008 – 29 February 2008	Operation Sun	27	240
24 July 2015 – 25 July 2015	Operation Martyr Yalçın	8	160
18 March 2016 – 19 March 2016	March 2016 Turkish incursion into northern Iraq	?	?
25 April 2017	2017 Turkish airstrikes in Syria and Iraq	0	33
15 August 2018	Turkish airstrikes on Sinjar (2018)	0	5
28 May 2019 – 14 June 2020	Operation Claw	17	417
15 June 2020 – 17 April 2022	Operations Claw-Lightning and Thunderbolt	305	141
10 February 2021 – 14 February 2021	Operation Claw-Eagle 2	90	31
23 April 2021 – 17 April 2022	Operations Claw-Lightning and Thunderbolt	36	387
17 April 2022 – 4 May 2022	Operation Claw Lock	83	995
Total:		282 (739)	6,417 (2,700)

== See also ==
- Turkish occupation of Iraqi Kurdistan
- Kurdish–Turkish conflict (1978–present) §External operations
- 2026 Iranian strikes on the Kurdistan Region
- PKK insurgency in the Kurdistan Region
