= Operation Claw (2019–2020) =

Turkish military operation

Operation Claw (2019)
- Part of the Kurdish–Turkish conflict (1978–present)
Date	28 May 2019 – 14 June 2020
Location	Northern Iraq
Result	Turkish victory: Turkish Army sets up three new bases in Hakurk region and establishes a dozen observation points; Start of Operations Claw-Eagle and Tiger
Territorial changes	Turkish Armed Forces sets up more forts and barracks

Belligerents
Turkey	PKK

Commanders and leaders
(Turkey) Recep Tayyip Erdoğan (Turkey) Hulusi Akar (Turkey) Yaşar Güler	Unknown

Units involved
Turkish Armed Forces: Turkish Air Force; Turkish Land Forces; Gendarmerie General Command: Village guards	KCK: HPG; YJA STAR; YDG-H; YPS; YBŞ; HBDH: MLKP; TAK BÖG

Casualties and losses
17 killed 74 killed (per PKK)	1,067 killed (AA claim) 67 killed (per PKK)

Operation Claw (Turkish: Pençe Harekatı) was a cross-border military operation undertaken by the Turkish Armed Forces (TAF) in Iraq's autonomous Kurdistan Region against the Kurdistan Workers' Party.

On the morning of 28 May 2019, Turkish troops fired artillery shells and launched air attacks, followed by border crossings by the Turkish Army and Gendarmerie Special Public Security Command. On 30 May 2019, the first Turkish losses were recorded when a specialist sergeant and a second lieutenant were killed in action.

On 31 May 2019, F-16 jets of the 181st Squadron "Leopard" hit PKK targets in the region. In late June, press sources reported that the Turkish military combat-tested the Bora ballistic missile during Operation Claw in the Kurdistan Region. In July, ground operations gradually died down, and only airstrikes were used in the Avasin-Basyan, Zap, Metina, Haftanin and Hakurk regions. 182nd Squadron "Accipiter", 181st Squadron "Leopard", and 14th UAV Systems Base Command participated in the operation.

On 13 July, Turkey launched the next part of the counter-terror operation (Operation Claw-2) in Northern Iraq. On 24 August, Operation Claw 3 was launched in Northern Iraq. As a result, the Turkish Army set up three new bases deep in the Hakurk region and established a dozen observation points. In June 2020, the Turkish military officially announced the start of Operation Claw-Eagle in Iraq.

== Operation Timeline ==
=== 2019 ===
Operation Claw 1

==== May ====
On 12 May 2019, a group of PKK soldiers ambushed the Turkish Armed Forces, resulting in the deaths of two militants and bringing the PKK death toll to 45 in May. The weapons and head cameras were seized showing the route the militants came from. Using the ambush as a justification, Turkey launched a 'counter-terror' military operation on 28 May in the Hakurk Region. The Turkish military objectives were to destroy PKK shelters and caves that they were hiding in. On the first night of the operation, Sekif Mountain, in the vicinity of Lolan Water and Martyr Derviş Hill, was bombarded by Turkish Armed Forces warplanes for hours, before Turkish commandos and special forces joined the airborne assault of the Sekif Mountain and Martyr Derviş Hill. Following the clashes, 15 PKK militiamen were killed on the first day of the operation. By the end of the next day, the PKK suffered further losses according to the Turkish National Ministry of Defence, who claimed that another 15 militants were either killed or captured in northern Iraq's Hakurk area since the start of the operation. The PKK death toll increased by four on 30 May, but at the same time, the first Turkish losses were recorded: a specialist sergeant and a second lieutenant killed in action. Turkish warplanes continually bombarded PKK positions until the end of May.

==== June ====
It was announced that three PKK militants were killed or captured. This was soon followed by news that another five PKK militants had been killed. On June 3, at least six PKK militants were killed or captured in the Zap region. In total estimates made by announcements by Turkey, the Turkish National Ministry of Defence stated that a total of 43 militants have been killed or captured in 'Operation Claw' since 28 May. It was reported that an Underwater Defence unit of the TAF operates in the area. On June 6, the Turkish Minister of Defense Hulusi Akar had said: "We will not leave the region until the last threat is neutralized." On 10 June, the Turkish Armed Forces destroyed 74 caves and shelters and 53 mines used by PKK militants in the Hakurk region, according to the Turkish National Ministry of Defense. At the end of June, Turkey continued the unceasing air bombardment of north Iraq by including Bayraktar Tactical UAS drones and TAI Anka into the operation in the Kurdistan Region, constantly launching airstrikes on PKK militants, and by the end of June, 112 PKK militants had been killed or captured in a major blow for the PKK. Some sources have reported that the Turkish military may have combat-tested the Bora ballistic missile during Operation Claw.

==== July ====
In July, the ground operation slowed down and only airstrikes were conducted. The 182nd Squadron "Accipiter", 181st Squadron "Leopard" and 14th UAV Systems Base Command participated together in the operations for the month.

Operation Claw 2

- 13 July: Turkey launches counter-terror Operation Claw-2 in Kurdistan Region.
- 18 July: One TAF soldier was killed and six were wounded.
- 19 July: The Defense Ministry states that militants suffered 34 casualties in airstrikes conducted between 17 and 19 July.
- 23 July: Halifan Hill and Zilok Hill captured in the Hakurk region.

==== August ====
In the beginning of August, most airstrikes were carried out in Hakurk Region.

- 3 August: A senior PKK leader, Nedim Karakulak (codenamed Kawa Garzan), who was in charge of PKK's logistical support around the Qandil and Hakurk region, was killed in the Kurdistan Region.
- 5 August: The Gorasher Mountain was captured, a large part of the Olmuş Valley under the control of Turkish Armed Forces.
- 10 August: A total of 80 militants killed or captured since the launch of the Claw-2 offensive.
- 14 August: TAF ATAK helicopters hit PKK targets in the village of Birkim.
- 15 August: Turkish fighter jets kill a total of 13 PKK targets in Kurdistan Region according to the Defense Ministry said.
- 19 August: TAF ATAK helicopters hit PKK targets in the Hakurk region.

Operation Claw 3

- 25 August: Three Turkish soldiers killed in a PKK ambush; seven soldiers were also heavily injured.
- 26 August: A total of 15 PKK militants killed in Operation Claw 3.
- 27 August: Operation of Claw-3 aims to destroy six camps in the Kurdistan Region.
- 28 August: Peshmerga forces forbid access to the villages of Kasrok, Mergashish, Darashish and Behnuna in the Haftanin region due to the Paw-3 operation.

==== September ====
- 11 September: During an air operation against a building in the Kandil/Bawlah region, KCK Executive Member "Pelşin Tolhildan" (code-named Gülüzar Tural) and women's structuring KJK's Executive Council Member "Jiyan Garzan" (code-named Saliha Kaytar) were killed.
- 12 September: TAF troops were deployed to the top of Karachal mountain to establish a new base via helicopters.
- 13 September: TAF units take Hales Mountain in Haftanin.
- 14 September: Operation Claw-3 continues in Kurdistan Region.
- 17 September: New bases established in the "Dayla (lelikan) region".
- 18 September: A total of 417 PKK militants are killed or captured over the past four months according to the Defense Ministry.
- 23 September: Two TAF personnel killed in a roadside bomb explosion in Kurdistan Region.

==== October ====
- 6 October: TAF fighter jets organized an air operation in Gara / Hezanke region.
- 7 October: Air operations carried out by Turkish Armed Forces fighters in Iraq/Fishabur region (border crossing Syria-Iraq area).
- 12 October: Organized air operations against PKK targets in the Haftanin region.
- 15 October: TAF fighter planes hit PKK targets in Kandil/Barawa region.
- 16 October: TAF warplanes organized air operations in Gara region of Kurdistan Region.
- 18 October: Two HPG militants were killed after an operation carried out by Bayraktar Tactical UAS.
- 28 October: A TAF soldier died of a heart attack after being transported by helicopter to Turkey.

==== November ====
- 20 November: Turkey claims to have killed or wounded ten PKK militants during an air attack in Haftanin area.

==== December ====
- 13 December: Two fighter jets and artillery units affiliated to the Turkish Armed Forces hit the slopes of Kani Dezan and Seri Ziraran.

=== 2020 ===
==== January ====
- 2 January: 2 TAF soldiers killed in clashes with PKK in Hakurk region.
- 7 January: 2 PKK members killed in Gara region, according to Turkish Ministry of National Defense.
- 8 January: Esme Erat, codenamed Delal Nurhak, a militant of the PAJK, and her driver, codenamed Zilan Kobani, were killed in an operation late last September in Kurdistan Region's Qandil region.
- 13 January: 2 village guards and a soldier died in counter-terror operations, says Turkish Defense Ministry
- 17 January: A Turkish soldier, who was injured while preventing a PKK attack, succumbed to his wounds, Turkey's Defense Ministry.
- 21 January: Turkey arrests suspect over killing of Turkish diplomat Osman Kose

==== February ====
- 29 February: PKK members killed in Metina, Gara regions were plotting attack, according to Turkish Defense Ministry.

==== March ====
- 9 March: Halide Tari KCK senior was killed in a joint operation conducted by Turkish intelligence (MIT) and armed forces (TAF)
- 13 March: Warplanes from the Turkish Armed Forces hit the Bradost region of Sidekan. Sidekan District Director İhsan Çelebi said that on March 13, at around 16:00, Turkish fighter planes hit the countryside of Khalifa and Geli Reş villages after flying for an hour in the region.
- 26 March: An air strike was carried out after two Turkish soldiers were killed and two others injured. It was announced that the TAF has wounded of killed several members of the PKK in Iraq.
- 27 March: Turkish artillery intermittently shot PKK positions in the rural areas of the village of Lelkan, high sections of the village of Helifan and Hakurk skirts.

==== April ====
- 3 April: 111 militants neutralized and 67 others surrendered to the security forces this month, according to Turkish security sources
- 15 April: Galya Bekir, also known as "Berivan Sarya", a top leader of the PKK/KCK, who was the Makhmur Front Officer, was killed by the operation of the National Intelligence Agency. His death was announced by the Turkish authorities on 14 May 2020.
- 16 April: A TAF soldier died Turkey's defense minister posts message of condolence on Twitter
- 16 April: Iraqi Foreign Ministry summons Turkish envoy
- 17 April: The National Defense Ministry said on Twitter on Friday that security forces busted and destroyed PKK shelters during operations in Cukurca, Hakkari, southeastern Turkey, and Kurdistan Region's Haftanin region. In operations, security forces destroyed three binoculars, including two night vision ones, two grenades, five detonators, two 60 mm mortar ammunition and 287 bullets, three RPG-7 rocket launcher ammunitions, four RPG-7 propelling cartridges, two solar panels and life essentials found in shelters and caves in the area.

==== May ====
- 4 May: Warplanes affiliated with the Turkish Armed Forces hit PKK positions around the village of Sinine in the Bradost region.
- 22 May: The Free Women's Units destroyed a Turkish military position and killed four Turkish soldiers at the Lêlîkan hill. A video of the attack was published in Gerîla TV on 12 July. The Turkish Air Force launched airstrikes in Seladize/Kurah Zur area the same day in retaliation.
- 27 May: Turkey 'neutralizes' 10 PKK militants in Kurdistan Region.

==== June ====
- 3 June: Turkey claims to have destroyed 3 cave shelters of the PKK in N. Iraq
- 4 June: The aircraft belonging to the TAF organized an air operation against targets in the Berwari valley.
- 10 June: Propane cylinders, ammonium nitrate, cables, and batteries seized in the region.
- 14 June: The Turkish Defense Ministry says that military jets successfully targeted PKK militants in Sinjar and Qandil, Iraq, among other places. The ministry claimed it was in response to increased militant attacks on Turkish bases. Start of new operation Operation Claw-Eagle Iraq.

== See also ==
- 2019 Turkish offensive into north-eastern Syria
- Operations Claw-Eagle and Tiger
- Operation Claw-Eagle 2
- Operations Claw-Lightning and Thunderbolt
