= 2023 Makhmour clashes =

Clashes in the Iraqi–Kurdish conflict

- Part of Iraqi–Kurdish conflict
| Date | October 22, 2023 (1 day) |
| Location | Makhmur, Nineveh Governorate, Iraq |
| Result | Ceasefire: Iraqi Army and Peshmerga agree to share control of former PKK military posts in Makhmur district; Iraqi army gains control of three of them and Makhmur refugee camp; Iraqi government extends territorial control northward towards Erbil |

Belligerents
| Iraq | Kurdistan Region |

Commanders and leaders
| Unknown | (Kurdistan Region) Saleh Zirari † (Kurdistan Region) Posho Khalid † |

Units involved
| Iraqi Ground Forces | (Kurdistan Region) Peshmerga |

Casualties and losses
| 2 killed 6 wounded | 4 killed 5 wounded |

The Makhmour clashes (October 22, 2023) occurred between Iraqi Ground Forces and Peshmerga in the Kurdish majority Makhmur District and its surrounding northwestern mountain range. The district is part of the disputed territories, and as such, the area is claimed by the Kurdistan Regional Government. Prior to the clashes, the Kurdistan Workers Party (PKK) were stationed in military posts between the two sides as well as in Makhmour refugee camp. The clashes began after PKK suddenly withdrew from their posts (including from Makhmour refugee camp), allowing the Iraqi army to take control of the camp as well as advance further north towards Erbil. The KRG rejected the move, claiming that it violated a previous agreement between the Iraqi army’s Nineveh Joint Operations Command and Peshmerga. Kurdish officials later attributed the clashes to "a misunderstanding".

== Background ==
The district of Makhmour is located in a contested area in northern Iraq, situated strategically between the cities of Mosul in the north-west, Erbil in the north-east and Kirkuk in the south-east. Following the 2017 Iraqi-Kurdish conflict, the Iraqi army took control of the town of Makhmur, while Peshmerga withdrew from large parts located south of Erbil including Gwer, located approximately 20 kilometers from the city. The PKK however, remained stationed in military posts between the two sides as well as in Makhmour camp, which houses Kurdish refugees from Turkey. The camp is located in an area disputed between Baghdad and Erbil and was therefore characterized by a security vacuum. It had been hit many times by Turkish forces claiming to target the Kurdistan Workers’ Party (PKK). On the 19th of October, the PKK announced that it had withdrawn all its fighters from the area (specifically three military posts and the refugee camp) and Iraqi troops were subsequently stationed in the areas they had evacuated. The Kurdistan Regional Government based in Erbil rejected the move, as it claims the territory the PKK withdrew from belongs to its own jurisdiction. This prompted the Peshmerga to attack the Iraqi army.

== Clashes ==
The clash, which reportedly broke out in the afternoon, and lasted for around two hours before abating when commanders from both sides sought to defuse tensions, said Iraqi military and Peshmerga sources. During the clashes, the commander of the 18th Peshmerga infantry brigade Salih Zirari died and his deputy Posho Khalid later died at hospital.

== Aftermath ==
Iraqi Prime Minister Mohammed Shia Al Sudani called for restraint following clashes between the Iraqi army and Kurdish Peshmerga forces in the disputed area, and directed a high-level committee to investigate the incident. The decision was welcomed by the Peshmerga ministry. In November 2023, it was announced that the Iraqi Army and Peshmerga had come into an agreement. It included dividing the previous three PKK evacuated (military) positions into six and split between the two sides. The agreement did not include sharing control of the town of Makhmur nor the refugee camp. Ultimately, the Iraqi army extended its territorial control, including over the refugee camp. The clashes resulted in 6 fatalities in total; two Iraqi soldiers and 4 Peshmerga. The commander of the 18th Peshmerga infantry brigade Salih Zirari, and his deputy Posho Khalid were among the dead.
