= Nüfuz Edici Bomba =

Nüfûz Edici Bomba
- Type: Air-to-surface missile
- Place of origin: Turkey

Service history
- In service: In service
- Used by: F-4/F-16
- Wars: Turkey-PKK conflict; Operations Claw-Eagle and Tiger; Operation Claw Eagle

Production history
- Designer: TÜBİTAK SAGE
- Variants: NEB-84/NEB-T

Specifications
- Mass: 870 kg
- Length: 2600 mm
- Width: 457 mm

NEB (Nüfûz Edici Bomba, Penetrating Bomb) is a type of bunker buster produced by TÜBİTAK SAGE and used by Turkey. It is designed to penetrate at least 2.1 meters thick reinforced concrete with a hardness of 35 megapascals.

NEB's main targets are military bunkers, hangars, bridges and military cave systems. The bomb is also suitable for guidance kits like HGK.

== Specifications ==
Per TÜBİTAK SAGE:

Length: 2600 mm

Width: 457,2 mm

Mass: 870 kg

== Operational use ==
The NEB has been actively used by Turkish forces and integrated with both F-4 Phantom II and F-16 Fighting Falcon aircraft. It has seen deployment during operations such as Operation Claw-Eagle and engagements within the broader Turkey–PKK conflict.

== Development ==
The development of the NEB began as part of Turkey's efforts to establish a domestic alternative to imported bunker buster munitions. The first delivery of NEB units to the Turkish Armed Forces occurred in 2020.

== See also ==
- Turkish Air Force
