= Dizayee (tribe) =

Sorani-speaking Sunni Kurdish tribe

Dizayee also spelled as Dizay or Dizayi (Kurdish: دزەیی; Dizayī) are a Sorani-speaking Sunni Muslim Kurdish tribe, their territory is the Erbil plain. The tribe was also known as Dizdi or Dizdti in historical documents.

== History ==
The Dizayi tribe are decscandant from Ahmad Pasha Dizda, a 19th-century Kurdish chief who was the ruler of Erbil and its plain. Their first settlement was the village of Kurd-mela. But they expended their settlements and domain onwards to include Makhmur, Erbil and Erbil plain. The tribe was recorded to have 4 ruling families; 1 Ibrahim Aghayi House, 2 Mam Zainadini, 3 Mahmud Aghayi, 4 Hussein Aghayi.

According to Hay (1920), the Dizayee tribe numbered around 30 thousand people. The Semi-nomadic Dizay lived in villages at the edges of Erbil plain, which they left for the mountains during summer. The Dizayee tribe was described to be respectable tribe who did not commit the act of Brigandage.

Under newly made Kingdom of Iraq, the Dizayi tribal chiefs were able to secure their overlordship due to their close connection with the authorities of Baghdad.

== list of Dizayee villages ==
This is a list of villages that were under Dizayee landlords:

- Qushtapay Gawra
- Qushtapay Bchuk
- Braim (Ibrahim) Bak or Beg
- Kusuka
- Bilnka Nadir
- Mir Ghuzar
- Pir Dawud
- Dusra Fetah
- Dusra Jebar
- Sorbash Kaka-Allah
- Sorbash Khazar
- Sorbash Huez
- Soricha
- Dooghan
- Gird-'Azban
- Aliyawa
- Hilawa
- Awdaluk
- Kasnazan
- Minara
- Baqirta
- Terbe-Spiyan
- Qazi-Khane
- Girde Shine
