= Turkish-occupied territories =

Turkish-occupied territories may refer to:

- Turkish-occupied Northern Cyprus (ongoing since 1974)
- Turkish occupation of Iraqi Kurdistan (1980s–present)
- Turkish occupation of northern Syria (2016–2026)
- Turkish occupation of Imia (temporarily in 1996) as part of the ongoing Aegean dispute with Greece
