= Turkish occupation of Iraqi Kurdistan =

- Situation as of June 2026: Iraqi government control Kurdistan Region control Turkish Armed Forces control
- Status: Military occupation

Establishment
  - Initial cross-border invasions: 1984–1992
  - Establishment of permanent bases: 1992–c. 2010s
  - Significant buildup: c. 2010s–present

Area
  - Total: 2,000 km^{2} (770 sq mi)

Since 1984, Turkey has launched repeated invasions into Iraqi Kurdistan with the pretext of fighting the Kurdistan Workers' Party (PKK) and establishing temporary buffer zones. When the de facto autonomous Kurdistan Region (KRI) was established in 1992, instability allowed both the PKK to establish more camps in the region and Turkey to erect permanent military bases there and assert authority over the Iraq–Turkey border. From the early 2010s to the present, the Turkish military buildup in the region has increased significantly and constitutes, according to various observers, human rights organizations, and Iraqi politicians, a military occupation known to locals as the "forbidden zone."

The PKK's announcement to disband itself in early 2025 led to renewed debates over the legitimacy of Turkey's occupation. Conflicting reports emerged over whether the Turkish army had paused operations or withdrawn from the area.

== Occupation zone ==
The occupation of Iraqi Kurdistan has been likened to the Turkish occupation of northern Syria. Starting at the Iraq–Turkey border and spanning almost its entire length (86.2% in 2024), the occupation zone extends up to 40 km (25 miles) into Iraqi Kurdish territory in some areas. The Turkish-controlled areas have been described as a "Turkish zone", "security line", "red zone", a militarized "restricted area", or "de facto secure zone" covering approximately 2,000 km^{2} (770 sq mi) of territory, mostly of the autonomous Kurdistan Region, including parts described as the region's "heart[land]."

Notable settlements inside the zone include Kani Masi, Barwari Bala, and Sheladize. Notable areas just outside or near the zone include the Gara Mountains, Metina Mountains, Hawt Tabaq Mountains, Batifa, Deraluk, and Bamarni, while bigger cities include Zakho, Amedi, and Duhok. The occupied areas are predominantly populated by Kurds, with smaller Christian communities. Before the Turkish military presence, the area had long been a popular tourist destination for people from the rest of Iraq.

== Administrative structure ==
Unlike in Syria, Turkish control in Iraqi Kurdistan has not resulted in the creation of proto-state structures. Administration remains in the hands of the Kurdistan Regional Government (KRG).

== Occupation force ==
=== Turkish forces ===
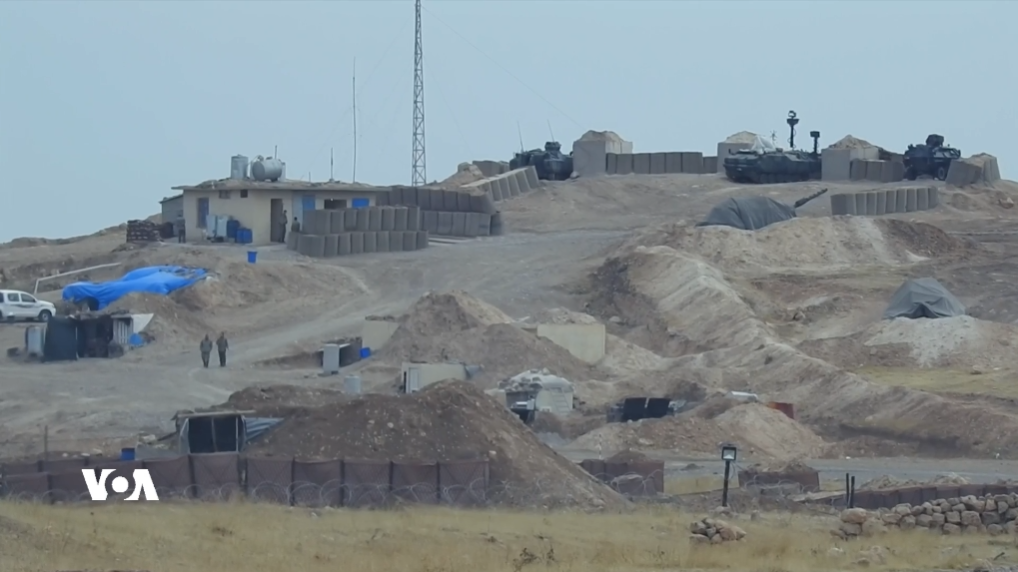
Turkish military base in Iraqi Kurdistan, June 2026.

Informal estimates suggest that Turkey has a permanent deployment of 5,000 to 10,000 soldiers in the region. In July 2022, Iraqi Army Chief of Staff Abdel Emir Yarallah claimed that Turkish deployments consisted of around 4,000 troops, as well as heavy artillery, tanks, and helicopters. According to the Turkish Ministry of Defense, its special forces are also deployed in the region.

Turkish checkpoint on a rural road in Dohuk Governorate, Iraqi Kurdistan.

The Turkish occupation includes more than 100 military bases in the region, 89% of which have been built after 2018. Five of the bases are considered major hubs, while Gre-Barukh, built in 1997, is the largest Turkish military base in the region. It facilitates logistics and coordination for thousands of Turkish soldiers. In comparison to smaller outpost, the main military bases feature concrete blast walls, watch and communication towers and space for armoured vehicles. Turkish bases are often placed on strategic mountaintops. Turkey has built extensive road networks to connect its military bases, with the BBC estimating at least 660 km (410 miles) of roads. In February 2024, Ankara announced that a newly constructed road would "streamline the movement of military and logistical supplies to its bases in the Kurdistan Region of Iraq." Previously Turkey had supplied cut-off military bases through helicopters. Besides fixed military bases, Turkish forces also set up smaller military checkpoints along roads to control traffic and regularly conduct military patrols in the region.

While the Iraqi Border Guards are responsible for protecting the country's border, Turkish forces have superiority in the area and have on multiple occasions pushed back Iraqi forces, with Iraqi General Farhad Mahmoud stating in 2025, "We cannot reach the border."

=== Foreign fighters ===
According to Kurdish sources, Turkey also employs "Jihadists", "Al-Nusra", "Syrian jihadists", and "former terrorists of the ISIS [Islamic State] era" in the zone. In an interview with Voice of America (VOA), the spokesman of the PKK umbrella organization, the Kurdistan Communities Union (KCK), claimed that jihadists had been brought in, citing PKK fighters hearing "soldiers shouting in Arabic in the heat of the battle." A VOA investigation further found that Abdurrahman Mustafa, a leader within the Syrian Interim Government, posted on X that "We are fully prepared to determine the time and place of Turkey's activities in northern Iraq," citing it as evidence of the presence of Syrian fighters. Patriotic Union of Kurdistan (PUK) spokesman Saadi Ahmad Pira also claimed that "The forces that are coming to the Kurdistan Region today include more than 300 former terrorists of the ISIS era; I have photos and names." VOA's report came amid allegations that Turkey had deployed Syrian fighters during the Second Nagorno-Karabakh War.

Similar allegations have also been made by third parties. The UK-based Syrian Observatory for Human Rights (SOHR) reported that Turkey began extensively recruiting fighters from the Syrian National Army (SNA) in July 2024 for deployment to Iraqi Kurdistan, with some allegedly already having engaged in fighting against the PKK in the region. Steve Sweeney, a journalist for the Morning Star, cited testimonies from local residents alleging that members of "jihadist groups" wearing Turkish military uniforms were present in the Barwari Bala region.

== Support ==
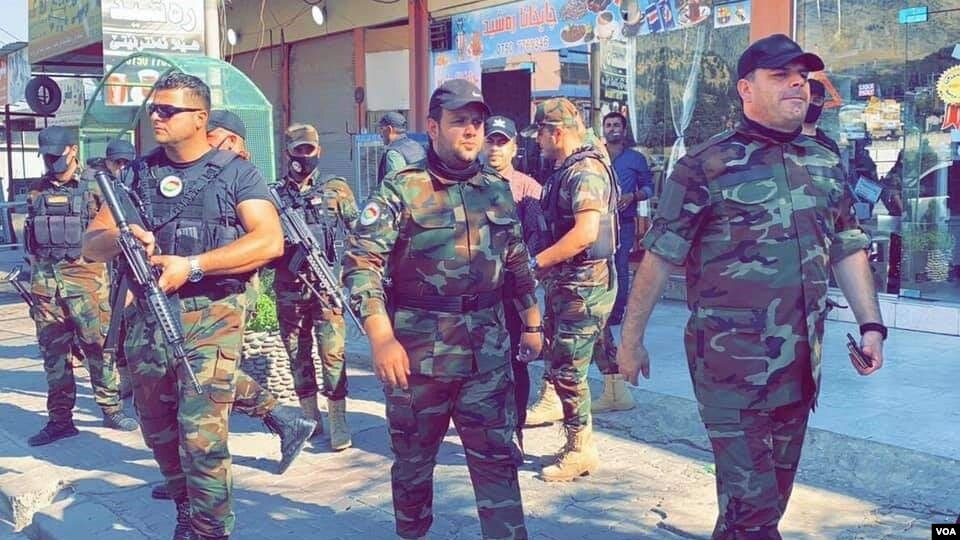
Asayish forces impose a curfew in Sheladize following protests against the Turkish military presence, June 2020.

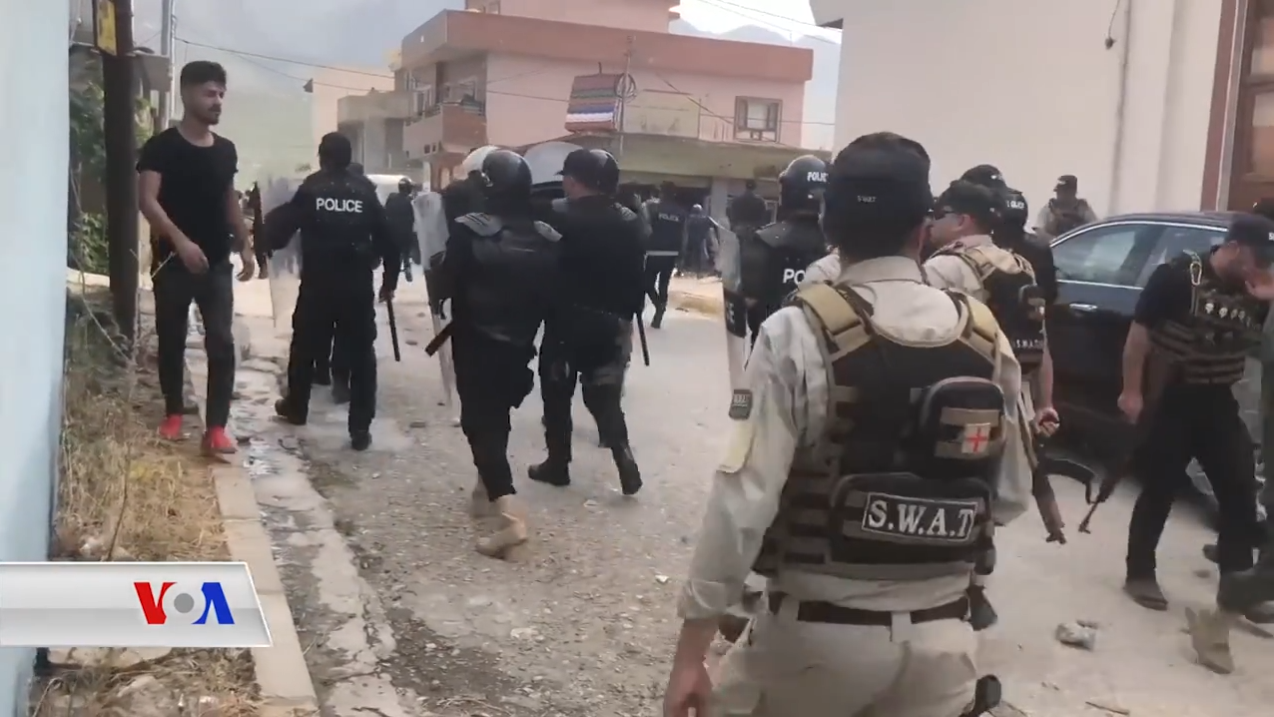
KRI Police disperse protests against the Turkish occupation in Sheladize, June 2020.

Turkish forces have received passive support from the KRG's main ruling party, the Kurdistan Democratic Party (KDP) and its Peshmerga forces, including by encircling PKK areas and creating logistical obstacles to PKK mobility. However, the KDP avoids direct military involvement due to strong Kurdish nationalism among locals and Peshmerga forces. This cooperation has nevertheless contributed to a decline in the KDP's popularity. Some of these Kurdish forces, have been describes as being jashes. Pro-PKK outlet ANF News, has frequently criticized the KDP for supporting the Turkish Army. They allege that the KDP has deployed special forces, such as the Gulan Forces, along with heavy equipment and personnel trained by the Turkish private military contractor SADAT, to pressure PKK forces.

According to a BBC investigation, locals said that authorities in the region cooperate with the Turkish military to prevent farmers from accessing their land and arrest suspected PKK supporters and critics of Turkey's military presence. Separately, Morning Star journalist Sweeney reported that Turkey's National Intelligence Organization (MIT) and the KDP's Parastin intelligence service were believed to cooperate unofficially in the area, with residents telling him they were regularly threatened.

A conversation during Sweeney's investigation in December 2021 between him and a local resident states:

"If they find you here they will kill you. And if they know we have spoken to you they will kill us. [...] "Barzani (leader of the KDP). He is helping Turkey. The [KDP] will kill us, or Turkey will kill us. They are the same. There are many intelligence services here. They sometimes stay in the bases together."

A doctor testified that he was forced to change medical records after documenting chemical injuries on a patient following a reported chemical weapons attack in the area. His testimony states:

"[...] we are threatened by [local] security forces. [They] doubted our diagnosis and treatment. We said we know it is chemicals and it is what we treated them [patients] for. [...] we were made to change the report and say we made a mistake. We know we would have been kicked out of the job and maybe even arrested or tortured. This is what Parastin do. And they make people disappear."

According to Sweeney, some locals also criticized the lack of media coverage, claiming that "Rudaw and Kurdistan 24 are liars" and that they are affiliated with the Barzani family.

== Impact ==
=== Civilian displacement ===
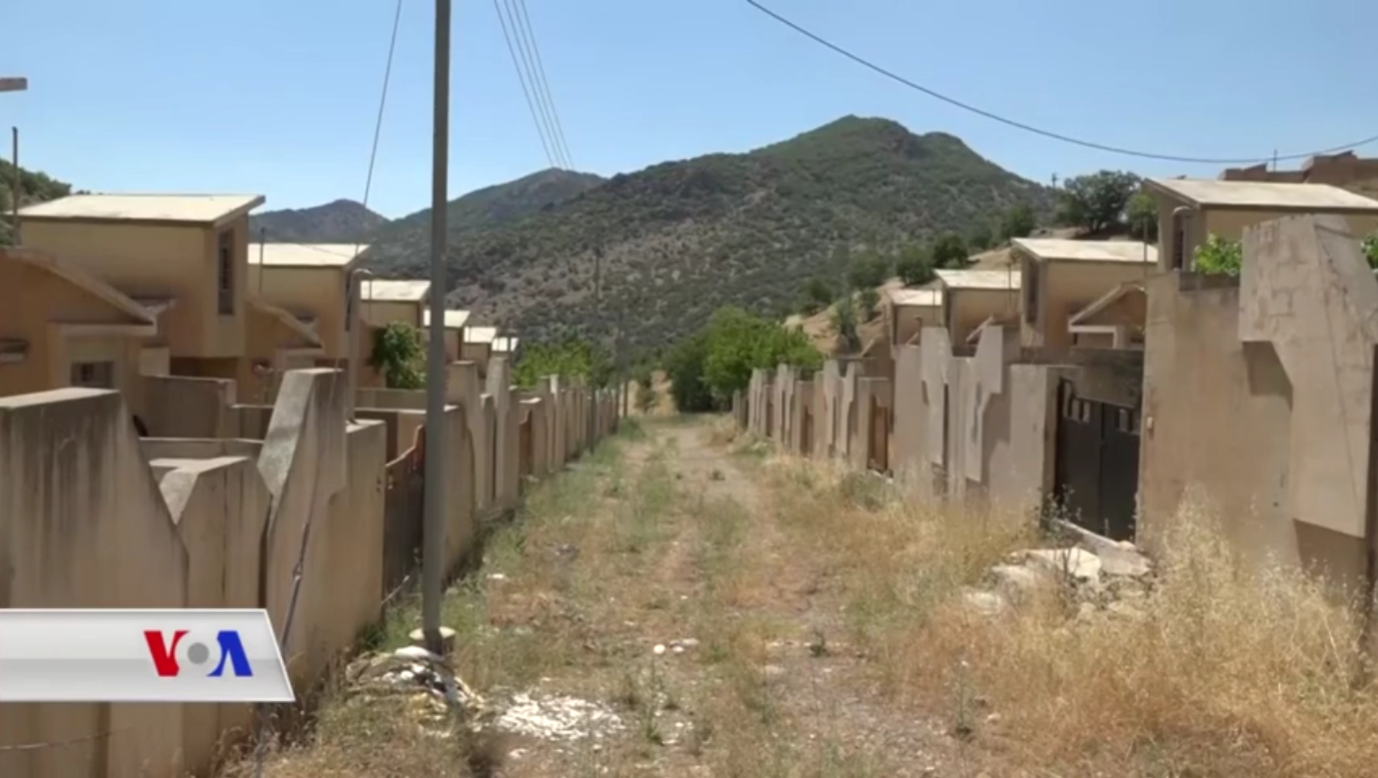
Houses stand abandoned in the Upper Barwari region of Iraqi Kurdistan after residents fled due to the Turkish military presence and attacks.

With the expansion of the zone, increasing numbers of civilians have been displaced as large swathes of land have been declared off-limits by Turkish forces. A 2020 Kurdistan parliamentary report stated that thousands had been displaced and whole villages emptied. According to Community Peacemaker Teams (CPT), a U.S.-based human rights organization, at least 602 villages have been directly affected by the Turkish occupation, with 162 already displaced or abandoned. According to the Iraqi Civil Society Solidarity Initiative, an estimated 500 villages have been abandoned since 2015, while a significant but unspecified number of families have been displaced due to destruction or concerns for their safety.

Salam Saeed, a farmer from Kani Masi, described the situation in his village, located near a large Turkish military base:

"The moment you get here, you will have a drone hover over you [...] They will shoot you if you stay [...] All they want is for us to leave these areas."

Turkish soldiers have reportedly gone to villages and warned residents, house by house, against cooperating with the PKK, raising concerns over possible forced displacement and other restrictions that critics said could amount to violations of international humanitarian law.

=== Civilian deaths and injuries ===
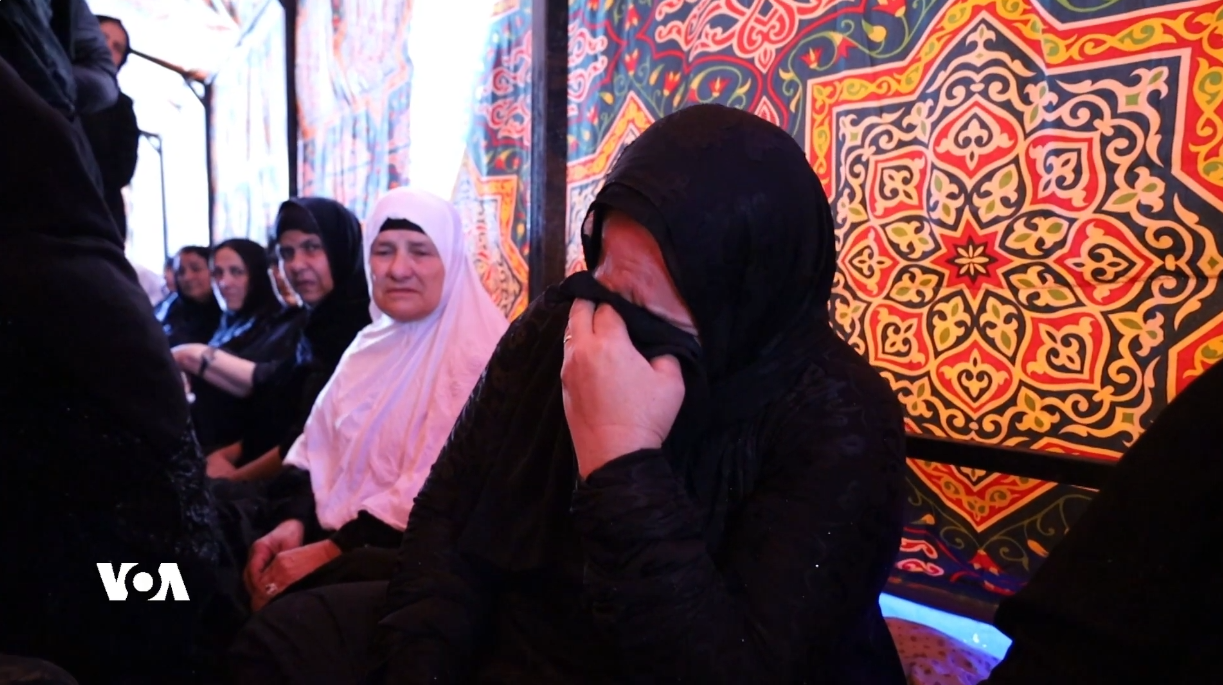
Mourning ceremony for two Kurdish civilians that were killed in a Turkish attack in Sheladize, Iraqi Kurdistan, April 2023.

Civilians inside the zone are at risk of being targeted by Turkish forces. According to CPT, Turkish military actions inside the zone since 1991 have resulted in more than 700 civilians being killed or injured. Civilians have been targeted not only by airstrikes but also by artillery, mortar, and heavy machine-gun fire from nearby Turkish military bases. In 2022, most civilian casualties were caused by attacks originating from these bases. Villages have repeatedly come under fire from these positions, while picnickers, large local gatherings, and festivals have also been targeted. CPT described this as the "terroriz[ation] of Kurdish villages."

The BBC reported that, KDP-aligned authorities in the region may have acted to help Turkey evade accountability for civilian casualties. The civilian impact of Turkish operations remains underreported.

=== Impact on infrastructure ===
Civilian infrastructure has also been affected, including the destruction of houses, water wells, bridges, schools, and Assyrian churches.

=== Imapact on nature ===
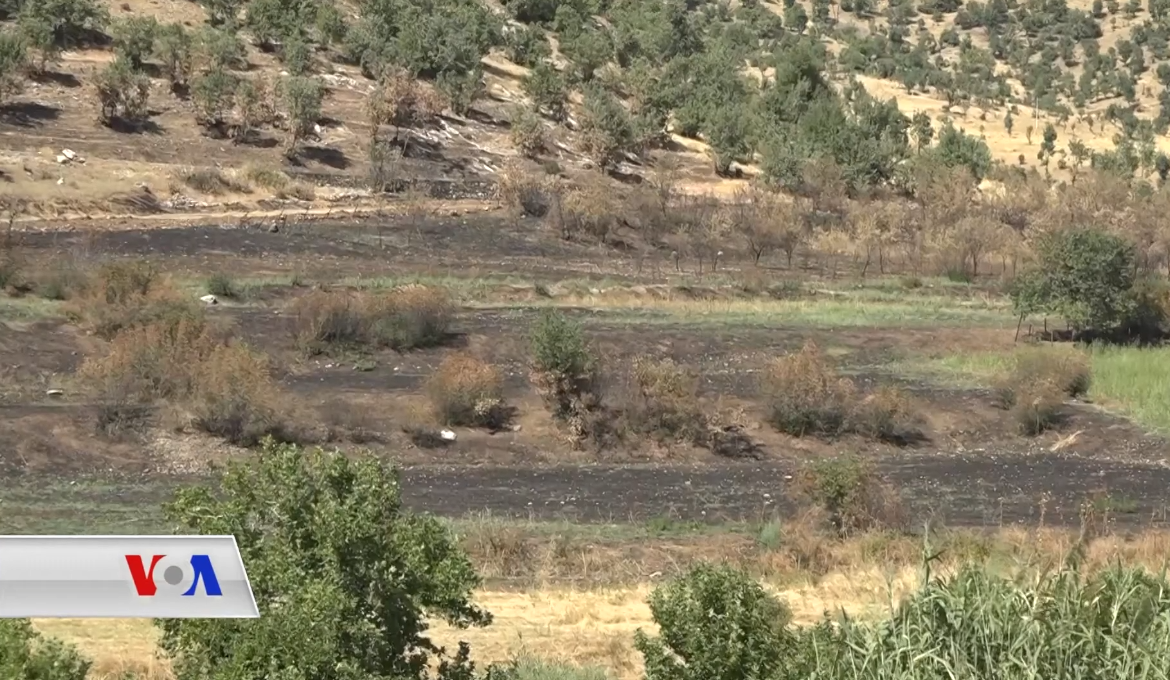
Burned land in Iraqi Kurdistan following Turkish shelling, April 2021.

According to the BBC, Turkey's construction of new roads and routes has resulted in deforestation and "left a lasting imprint" on the region's mountains. Videos and satellite images released by Rudaw in June 2021 caused outrage over alleged deforestation by Turkish forces. The hashtag #StopTurkeyEcocideKurdistan spread online, with videos showing cut-down trees and trucks hauling logs. The reports prompted reactions from politicians, including KRG spokesman Jotiar Adil, who called on Turkey to "cease its harmful and destructive activities," and Kurdish MP Chiya Sharif, who accused Turkey of committing "environmental genocide." Bella Caledonia argued that Turkish forces have deliberately destroyed forests to eliminate potential hiding places for PKK fighters, exploit timber resources, and damage the landscape because of its cultural significance to Kurds.

Land has frequently been burned due to shelling. According to CPT, approximately 55% of agricultural land in the village of Sargale, Amedi district, had been burned by Turkish bombardments in 2024. Other affected villages include Guharze, Balave, Barche, Kane, and Ashke Dere, all in the Amedi district. Additionally, orchards, vineyards, and apiaries, which are characteristic of the region, have also been regularly destroyed or abandoned due to the attacks.

=== Civilian reactions ===
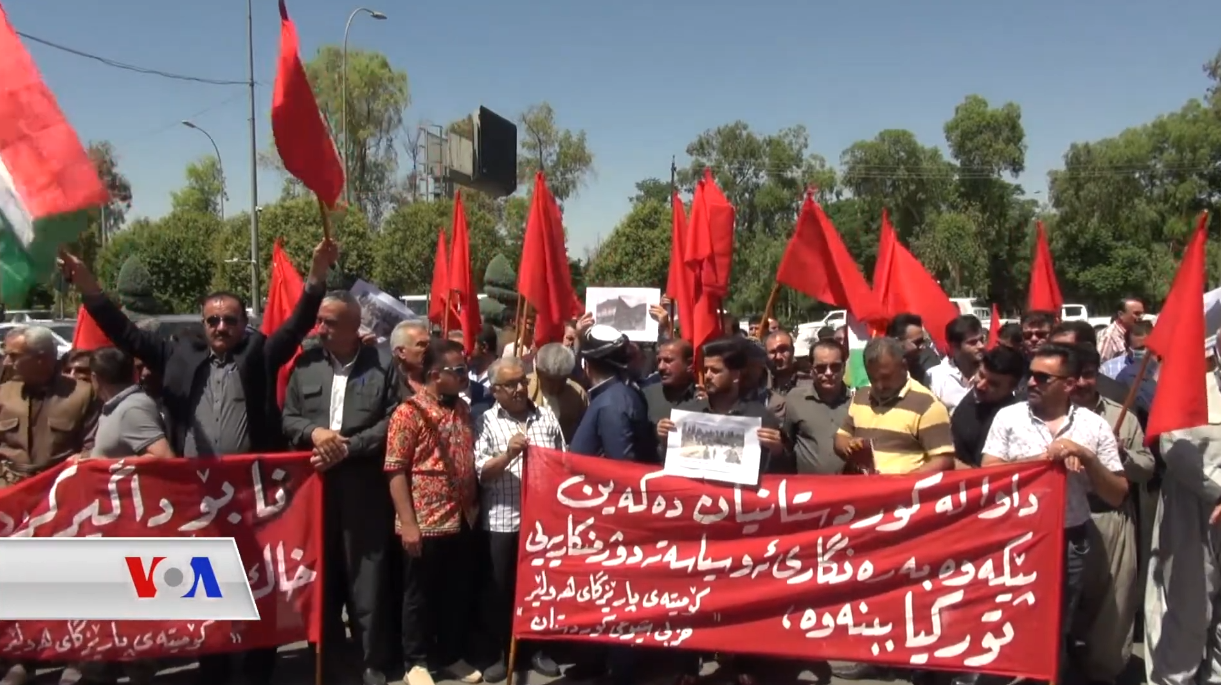
Protest against the Turkish military presence in front of the Kurdistan Parliament in Erbil, 11 June 2021.

Protests by the local population in the occupied zones and by Kurds elsewhere in the Kurdistan Region have been a regular occurrence in response to the occupation. In October 2007, mass protests erupted in Erbil over Turkey's planned expansion into KRI. In August 2024, in protest against the "Turkish occupation", youths from the Amedi district raised a six-meter Kurdistan flag in a village that had repeatedly been subjected to Turkish military operations. There have also been calls to boycott Turkish products.

==== Sheladize incident ====
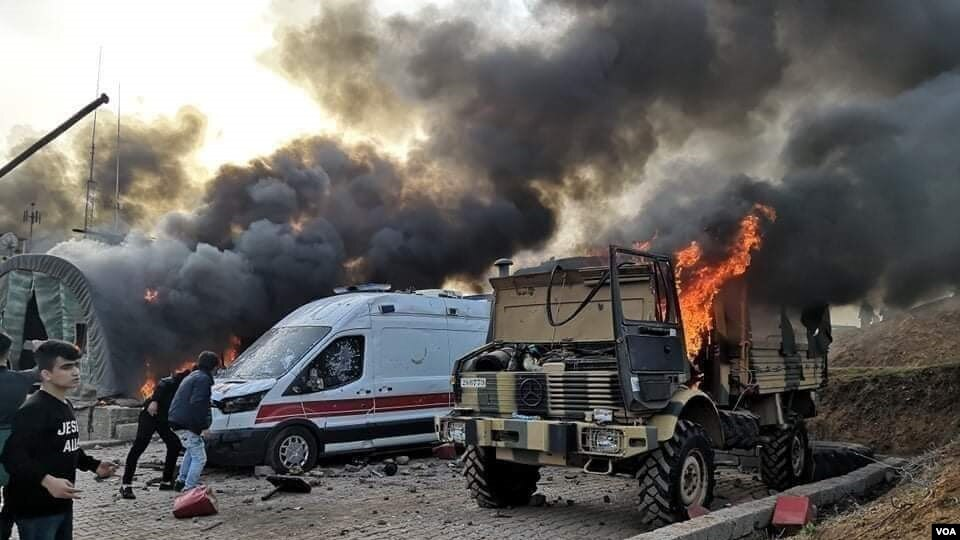
Protesters set fire to Turkish equipment during the Sheladize incident, 26 January 2019.

On 26 January 2019, a popular protest involving several hundred local Kurds erupted in Sheladize. The protest reportedly came in response to the killing of six local civilians in Turkish airstrikes earlier that week. During the protest, locals stormed the nearby Turkish military base, set fire to several vehicles, and destroyed some equipment, prompting Turkish soldiers to withdraw. As Turkish forces retook the base, soldiers fired warning shots but also opened fire on the crowd, while explosions from damaged equipment also occurred. According to differing sources, one or two protesters were killed and 10–16 others were injured. It remains unclear whether the protesters were killed by gunfire or the explosions. Protesters at the scene said the casualties occurred after Turkish forces opened fire on them. The protest was the first of its kind in Iraqi Kurdistan and was reportedly directed against the Turkish presence, the PKK, the fighting between them, and the civilian casualties resulting from the conflict. Turkey blamed PKK insurgents, who it claimed had infiltrated the protest, for the incident. The KRG expressed grief over the loss of life but maintained that the PKK's presence was the underlying cause. The Iraqi government summoned the Turkish ambassador in response to the incident.

== Views ==
=== Kurdistan Region ===
The areas of Turkish expansion in Iraq have mainly targeted the autonomous Kurdistan Region. The main ruling party in the Kurdistan Region, the KDP, has condemned the Turkish military presence, particularly before 2009. However, growing economic dependence on Turkey, expanding business ties, improving bilateral relations, rivalry with the Patriotic Union of Kurdistan (PUK), and the PKK's expansion into southern areas have led the KDP to increasingly support Turkish military operations.

=== Iraq ===
Under Saddam Hussein's Ba'athist Iraq, Turkish invasions into Iraqi Kurdistan were regularly approved, including a one-year agreement in 1984 that allowed Turkish forces to advance five km into Iraqi territory.

Today, the Republic of Iraq has repeatedly publicly condemned the Turkish presence, including nearly 300 UN memoranda of protest from 2018 to 2022. In 2024, Iraq's Parliamentary Security and Defense Committee intended to hold a meeting to discuss what it described as the Turkish "occupation" of areas in Duhok Governorate in the Kurdistan Region. However, Iraq's public appearance toward the occupation has not been consistent with its dealings with Turkey behind closed doors. The Iraqi government has several times accommodated Turkey's demands, including a 2024 memorandum of understanding between the two to jointly fight the PKK, which did not place any limitations on Turkish troops in Iraq. Iraq's stance is heavily influenced by its economic dependence on Turkey. Since the memorandum, Baghdad has remained silent on Turkish military actions, such as those in 2024 and 2025.

=== Turkey ===
In its fight against the PKK, Turkey has cited Article 51 of the UN Charter, which outlines sovereign nations' right to self-defense, to defend its military presence in the region. Since 2024, Turkish officials have tried to rebrand the occupation as "co-managed security" to appeal to Iraq, by maintaining an operational presence while granting Baghdad formal authority, such as through the 2024 memorandum, which transformed the long-contested Turkish base in Bashiqa into a Joint Training and Cooperation Centre under Iraqi command.

=== Iran and pro-Iran militias ===
So far, Iran has tolerated Turkish expansion into Iraqi Kurdistan. However, a Turkish incursion into Qandil, where the PKK's main bases are believed to be located, could provoke Iranian opposition, as it considers the area to be within its sphere of influence.

The occupation of Iraqi Kurdistan has largely been ignored by Shia pro-Iran militias in Baghdad due to a lack of cultural links with Sunni Kurds and lingering resentment from past conflicts between the two. However, the 2022 killing of Shia Arabs in Zakho sparked outrage among pro-Iran militia groups and their supporters, leading to rocket attacks on Turkish bases in Duhok and Nineveh governorates and the Turkish Consulate in Mosul.

=== Western states ===
As a NATO member, Turkey has received little criticism from Western states over its occupation of Iraqi Kurdistan. It is argued that Turkey has instead received support. The United States in particular has been described as having given Turkey a "blank check", with both the recent Biden and Trump administrations accused of ignoring Turkey's actions.

== See also ==
- List of Turkish operations in northern Iraq
- Turkish occupation of northern Syria
