= Makhmur district =

District in Nineveh Governorate, Iraq

Makhmur District قضاء مخمور
- District
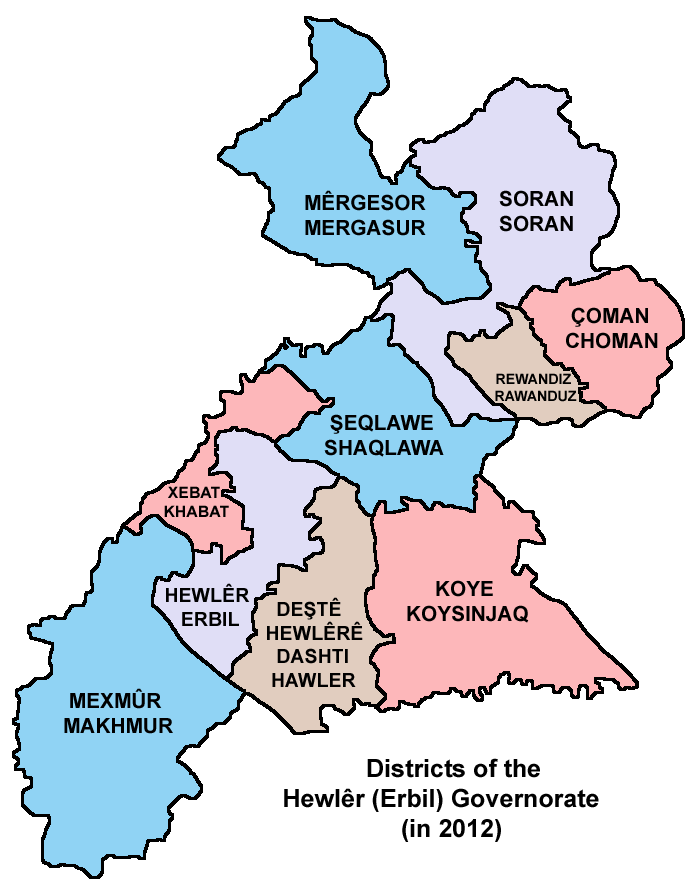
- Map showing Makhmur as one of the districts of the Hewlêr (Erbil) Governorate of Kurdistan Region in Iraq (in 2012).

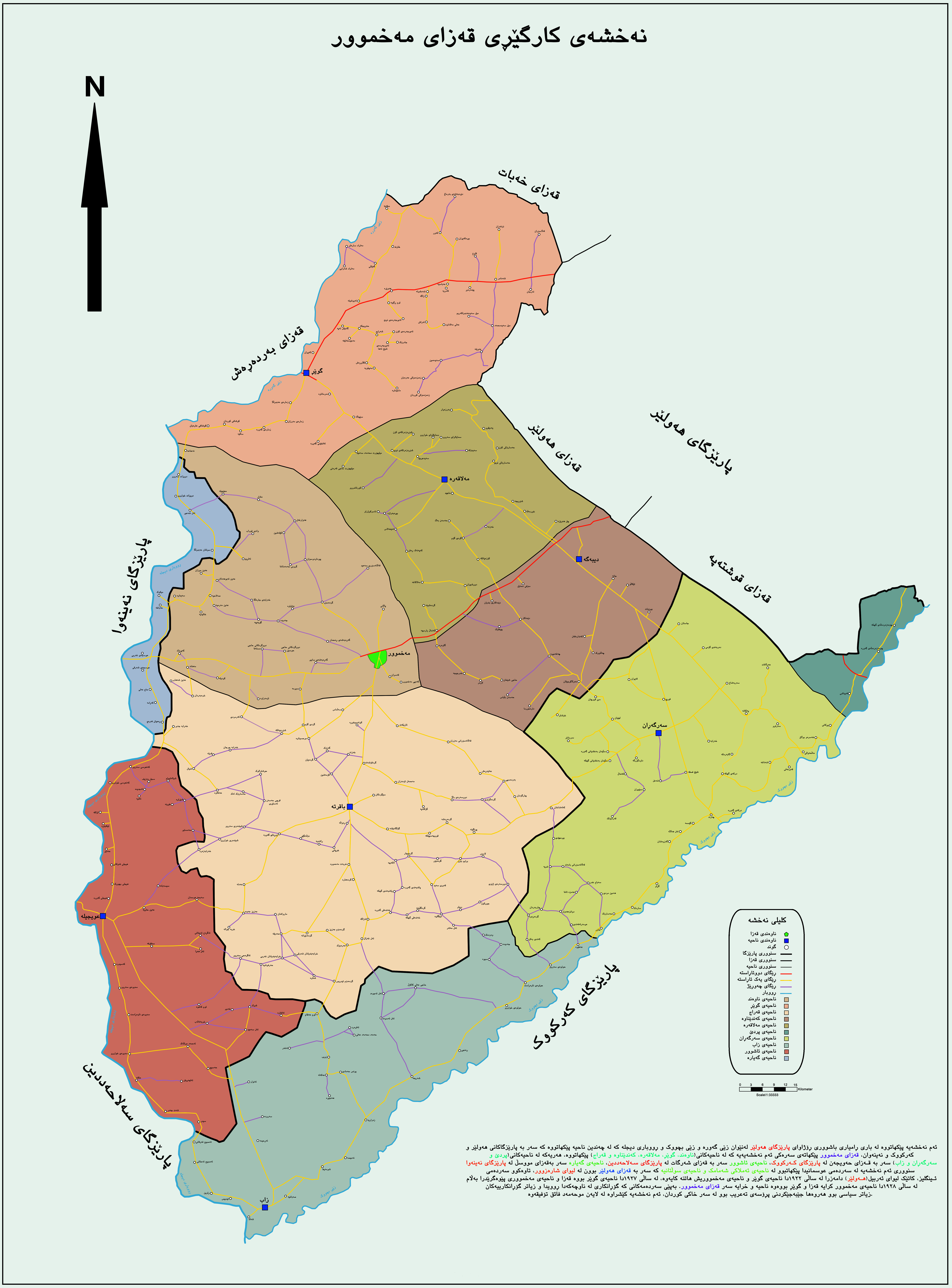
- Map of the district
- Interactive map of Makhmur District
- Location in Iraq
- Coordinates: 35°46′40″N 43°34′40″E
- Country: Iraq
- Governorate: Nineveh Governorate
- Administrative center: Makhmur, Iraq

Area
  - Total: 2,682 km^{2} (1,036 sq mi)

Population (2018)
  - Total: 209,545
  - Density: 78.13/km^{2} (202.4/sq mi)
- Time zone: UTC+3 (AST)
- Area code: +964 50

Makhmur District (Arabic: قضاء مخمور) is a district in Iraq's Nineveh Governorate. The administrative centre of the district is Makhmur. It is disputed between Erbil Governorate and Nineveh Governorate, and so it is one of the disputed territories of northern Iraq. The district had an estimated population of 209,545 people in 2018, the area of the district is 2,682 km^{2}, and the population density is 78.13 people/km^{2}. According to Erbil Governorate, the district has three sub-districts, Qaraj, Gwer, and Kandinawa, and it has 319 villages. Dibaga used to be a sub-district, however, it became a village, and Kandinawa became a sub-district. According to the Nineveh Governorate, the district has five sub-districts, Al-Kuwayr, Kandinawa, Makhmur Central, Mala Qara, and Qaraj.

== History ==
Before 1991, the large district of Makhmur was part of Nineveh Governorate. In 1997~1998, the Makhmour refugee camp was created North-East of the town to host refugees from Kurdish villages depopulated by Turkey. In 2003 Makhmur District became a part of Erbil Governorate. This lasted until 2008, when until further notice, the KRG agreed to hand over the district to the Federal Government. The district changed hands again in 2014, during the invasion of ISIS. The district was fully recaptured by Iraqi governmental forces in 2017, reaching al-Kuwayr, just 20 kilometers south of Erbil and pushing Peshmerga out. Today, all of the district including its capital is administered as part of Ninawah Governorate.

== See also ==
- Makhmour Refugee Camp
