= Makhmour refugee camp =

Refugee camp in Iraq

Makhmur Refugee Camp مخيم مخمور
- Refugee camp
- Location in Iraq
- Coordinates: 35°47′21.5″N 43°36′21.95″E
- Country: Iraq
- Governorate: Nineveh Governorate
- Established: 1998

Population (2023)
  - Total: 12,000
- Time zone: UTC+3 (AST)

The Makhmur refugee camp (also spelled Makhmour or Maxmur) was founded in 1998, and is located in the Makhmur District, some 60 Km southwest to Erbil, the capital of the Kurdistan Region of Iraq (KRG). About 12,000 Kurdish refugees, who fled the civil war between Kurds and the Turkish Armed Forces in the 1990s, live in this refugee camp. The refugees and their descendants stem from the depopulated Kurdish villages in Turkey. The Turkish authorities claim they had to depopulate the villages as they have been infiltrated by militants of the Kurdistan Workers Party (PKK).

== Background ==
In 1994, the refugees fleeing the Kurdish villages in Turkey were initially based in two camps near Zakho. The refugees were known to be loyal to the PKK and therefore were not assisted by the Kurdistan Democratic Party (KDP) which was worried about the leftist ideology the refugees could spread among the local population. The UNHCR would assist them, much more after the camps habitants staged a hunger strike in front of the UNHCR building in Zakho, demanding an official refugee status. The UNHCR eventually gave in and provided them with the status of refugees. Following some Turkish airstrikes and the UNHCR refusal to provide the Kurds with an official refugee camp, they established their own camp in the Bersive valley nearby. It was also in the Bersive camp, where the Kurds first organized an educational program for primary school. Seeing this development, the UNHCR arranged for all the Kurdish refugees from Turkey for a refugee camp in Atroush, some 65 km away from Duhok in Autumn 1994. By 1995, most of the refugees fleeing from Turkey, were provided with a living in Atroush camp. In December 1996, the Atroush camp was closed by the UNHCR. Following, a major part of the inhabitants accepted an offer by the Kurdistan Democratic Party (KDP) to move to Makhmur and another group moved to Ain Sifni. From Ain Sifni the refugees had to flee fighting between the PKK and the KDP, who was supported in its fight by the Turkish army. The Refugees then settled to Sheikan, but their situation remained dire as the KDP did not allow the UNHCR to provide help to the refugees. Eventually the World Food Programm and the UNHCR managed to gain access to the refugees. Then the refugees opted to also move to Makhmur and join the other former inhabitants of the Atroush Camp.

== History ==
The Makhmur camp was established in 1998 on the orders of Iraqi president Saddam Hussein. Since the refugees have built homes and developed an own education system. In Kurdish the camp is called the Wargeha Sehid Rustem Cudi, which translates into Martyr Rustem Cudi camp The camp received the support of the UNHCR. The UNHCR assisted to provide the refugees with legal documentation in 2011, which allows them to access to education and health services. Holders of the residency permit are also permitted to apply for work provided by the Government.

In June 2014, as the Islamic State (IS) captured large areas of northern Iraq, the Makhmour Protection Units (MPU) were established in the camp. The same year, Masoud Barzani, then the president of the KRG visited the camp, after the Kurdish forces evicted IS from the Kurdish regions south of Erbil. From July 2019 onwards, the KRG has limited the liberty of movement of most of the inhabitants of the camp in such way, that many have lost their jobs outside of the camp and the health services were not able to be provided in an adequate way, the Human Rights Watch reported in November 2019. Dindar Zebari from the KRG stated that the measure was taken out of security reasons. Several members of the PKK come from this camp. A "Garden of the Martyrs" was established at the camp, where deceased PKK members are remembered. In June 2021, Turkish president Recep Tayyip Erdoğan demanded from the Iraqi Government and also the United Nations (UN) that the PKK should be evicted from the camp or Turkey would do it themselves as a member of UN.

The PKK announced their complete withdrawal from the camp in October 2023, after which the Iraqi army took control.

== Turkish airstrikes ==
The refugee camp and its surroundings are often a target for Turkish airstrikes which has led to condemnation by the Iraqi Foreign Minister Mohamed Ali Alhakim and caused the inhabitants of the camp to label the Turkish army no better than IS. Makhmur Camp was bombed during Operation Claw-Eagle, launched by the Turkish Armed Forces on 15 June 2020. A Turkish official spoke to the BBC after the operation and claimed the airstrikes were directed at for the new roads built in the area through which attacks against Turkey were assumed to be executed.

On Saturday 5th, during the Operations Claw-Lightning and Thunderbolt, Turkey made a target airstrike assassination killing the camp manager, Dr. Bozkir, as well as two others. Turkey claimed Bozkir to be a senior PKK official and the camp to be "an incubator for terrorism".

The Jerusalem Post claimed the strike may have political value to distract from national embarrassment or may be motivated to continue to demonstrate and sell Turkish drones abroad. The US ambassador to the UN Linda Thomas-Greenfield expressed her opposition to airstrikes in civilian housing areas, a new stature compared to the Trump's administration laissez-faire.

== See also ==
- Kurdish villages depopulated by Turkey
- List of assassinations of the Kurdish–Turkish conflict
