= Allegations of third-party involvement in the Second Nagorno-Karabakh War =

Because of the geography, history, and sensitivities of the Nagorno-Karabakh conflict, accusations, allegations, and statements have been made of involvement by third-party and international actors during the Second Nagorno-Karabakh War, including in media reports. Azerbaijan has been accused of employing Syrian mercenaries during the war, including reports by the Syrian Observatory for Human Rights (SOHR). There have also been allegations of Kurdish militia from Syria and Iraq fighting on the Armenian side, and although some third-party sources had confirmed it, some publications had considered these claims "dubious". During the war, ethnic Armenian volunteers from the Middle East, Europe, and Latin America fought on Armenian side. Both sides have denied employing mercenaries in the war, but the OHCHR had stated that there were reports about Syrian fighters motivated primarily by private gain fighting on Azerbaijan's side recruited with Turkey's assistance and foreign nationals fighting on Armenian side with motivation being investigated, calling for withdrawal of any mercenaries and related actors from Nagorno-Karabakh.

== Afghan militants ==
On 7 October 2020, Artsakh's Presidential Spokesman Vahram Poghosyan said that according to intelligence, Turkish President Recep Tayyip Erdogan had reached an agreement with the leader of the Islamic Party of Afghanistan (Hezb-e-Islam) Gulbuddin Hekmatyar to involve "new terrorist groups in the war against Artsakh". On 17 October 2020, Armenia's National Security Service (NSS) stated that the Azerbaijani side is engaged in the transportation of a large amount of ammunition and mercenaries to its territory, citing the flights of Silk Way's Boeing 747 and Il-76 planes from Baku to air bases in different countries as evidence. According to the Armenian NSS, the Baku-Bagram flight was registered on 16 October, and the Bagram-Lashkar Gah-Baku flight on 17 October. The Armenian NSS reported that the same route was scheduled for 18 October and flights from Baku to Kandahar. It also notes that information on some of these flights is absent in the system of international timetables, and a number of airports do not have an international classification. On 2 October 2020, Afghanistan's declared diplomatic support for Azerbaijan prompted Armenia to push for an end to Kabul's observer status in the Collective Security Treaty Organization (CSTO), a Russian-led regional alliance.

== Armenian diaspora volunteers ==
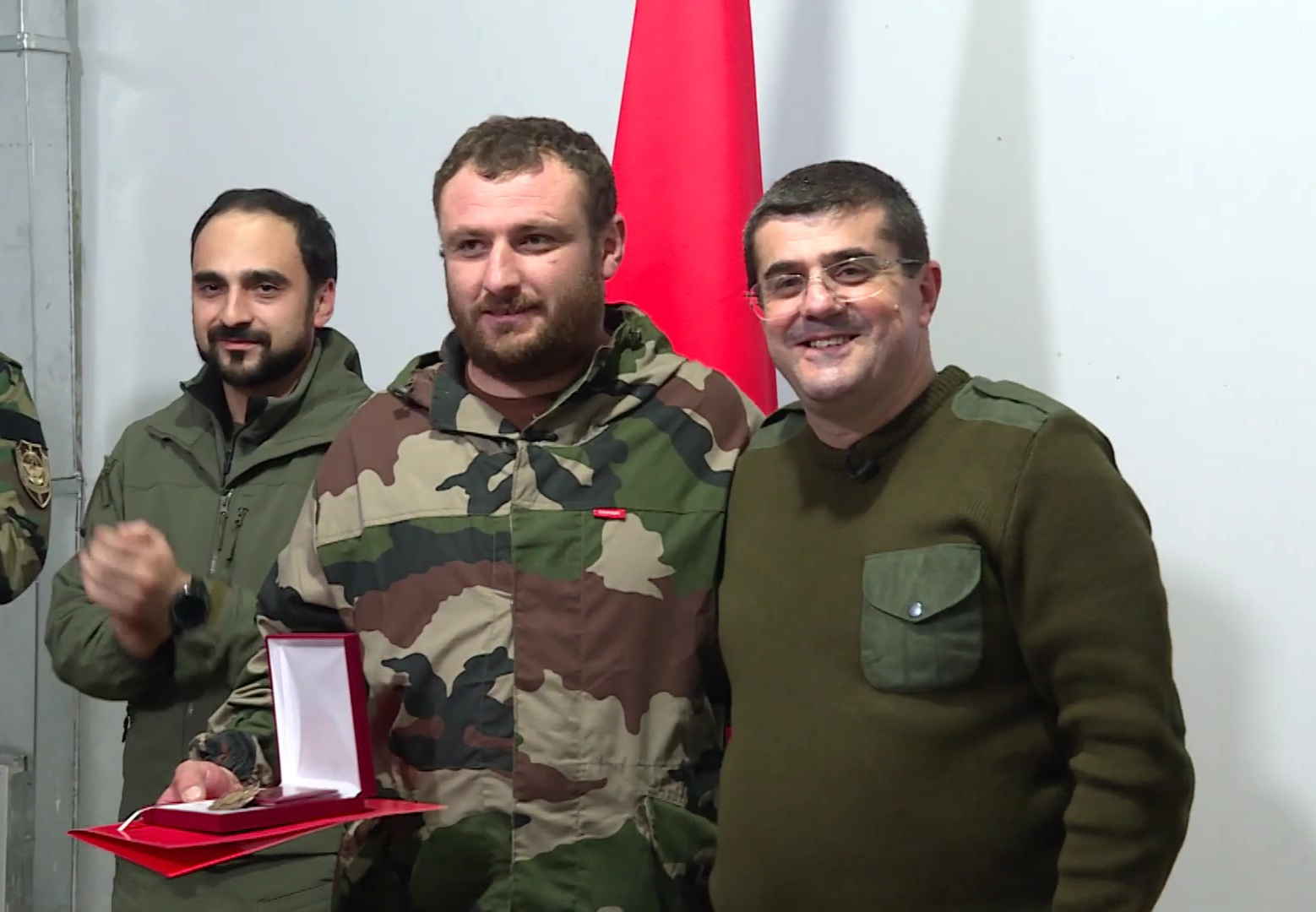
Artsakh's president Arayik Harutyunyan awarding an Armenian volunteer for capturing a Syrian mercenary on 2 November 2020.

On 28 September 2020, the Azerbaijani MoD alleged that among the Armenian casualties were "mercenaries" of Armenian origin from Syria and a variety of Middle East countries. On the same day, the Turkish Minister of Defence stated that Armenia must "send back the mercenaries and terrorists it brought from abroad". Two days later, Azerbaijani authorities asked the international community to "adequately respond to the use of terrorist forces by Armenia". On 30 September 2020, the SOHR also stated that Armenian-born Syrian fighters were being transported to Armenia to fight against Azerbaijan. The next day, Azerbaijani authorities stated that Armenia had widely employed foreign "terrorist forces" and "mercenaries" against it, with there being evidence of people of Armenian origin from the Middle East, especially Syria and Lebanon, and subsequently Russia, Georgia, Greece, the United Arab Emirates, and other countries. A Novaya Gazeta report, citing Lebanese Ministry of Internal Affairs intelligence, stated around 500 ethnic Armenian Lebanese had travelled to fight in Nagorno-Karabakh. In early October, Komsomolskaya Pravda reported that Armenians from Lebanon, who were members of Armenian Secret Army for the Liberation of Armenia, a militant group listed as a terrorist organisation by the United States, had supported Armenia in the war. Greek City Times have reported that about 500–800 Armenians from Greece, as well as some Greeks volunteered to the war on Armenia's side. An Armenian defence ministry official had said many from the diaspora applied to volunteer without giving a precise number. Hundreds from as far afield as Argentina and the United States have rushed back to Armenia for combat training, a local instructor says. Karapet Aghajanyan, the combat instructor in Yerevan, who trains local and foreign volunteers, told Reuters around 10 Lebanese-Armenians had received training in his camp. France 24 spoke to soldiers including Armenian diaspora from France fighting in the Nagorno-Karabakh.

== Israel ==
On 24 April 2021, the Chief of Air Defense Forces of the Armenian Army Armen Vardanyan stated that Israel has not only supplied military equipment to Azerbaijan during the Second Karabakh War, but also operated them. According to the Major General, Israel provided direct assistance through their operators and personnel during hostilities.

== Kurdish militias ==
On 30 September 2020, Turkish sources alleged that approximately 300 Kurdistan Workers' Party (PKK) militants were transported to Nagorno-Karabakh via Iran. However, according to Eurasianet and The Jerusalem Post, these claims were not substantiated by evidence. On 6 October 2020, the Azerbaijani State Security Service (SSS) claimed, citing intercepts, which it released as an evidence, that Armenia had employed foreign mercenaries, including members of Kurdish militant groups whom Armenia had brought from Iraq and Syria, to fight Azerbaijan. On the same day, Russia's Foreign Intelligence Service alleged that there were Kurdish extremist groups, which, according to Al-Monitor, are fighting on the Armenian side, while there is no direct evidence of it. In early October, Komsomolskaya Pravda reported that there was evidence of Armenia being supported by the Martyr Nubar Ozanyan Brigade militants, part of the Syrian Democratic Forces, and associated with the PKK. However, the Martyr Nubar Ozanyan Brigade strongly denied claims of them travelling to Armenia. The commander of the group mocked the Turkish accusation, saying "We know that this perception is completely false. Besides, everybody knows that the PKK members are not in Armenia. Because it's not Kurdistan."

== Pakistan ==
On 17 October 2020, the Armenian National Security Service stated that Azerbaijan was smuggling in a significant amount of ammunition, mercenaries and "terrorists" from Afghanistan and Pakistan. Pakistan rejected this allegation as "irresponsible propaganda", and said the claims by the Armenian government had no substance. Armenian Prime Minister Nikol Pashinyan said in an interview with the Indian news channel WION that there was "information that militants from Pakistan are involved in the war against Karabakh." He told Russian reporters about Pakistan's active role in the conflict. The President of Azerbaijan, Ilham Aliyev, stated that Pakistan had supported Baku diplomatically "but military assistance is out of the question." On 28 October 2020, based on informed sources, Kommersant reported that at least one batch of militants with weapons and ammunition were formed and sent from Pakistan's Peshawar to Karabakh. Later there were new reports about provided support by Pakistan to Azerbaijan during the war. In September 2021, the Azerbaijani MoD expressed his gratitude to Pakistan for its support during the war.

== Russia ==
On 9 November, the day when the ceasefire agreement was signed, the Azerbaijani forces in Nakhchivan Autonomous Republic accidentally shot down a Russian Mil Mi-24 attack helicopter near Yeraskh, in Armenia. According to Anton Troianovski and Carlotta Gall of The New York Times, this potentially gave Russia a reason to intervene in the war, and the Russian president Vladimir Putin delivered an ultimatum to the Azerbaijani president Ilham Aliyev. According to Troianovski and Gall, in this ultimatum, Russia stated that if Azerbaijan did not cease its operations after seizing control of Shusha, it will intervene. The same night, an unknown missile hit an open area in Khyrdalan, near Baku, without causing any injuries, according to the Azerbaijani sources. Also, yet again on the same day, a video emerged on the social media apparently showing the Armenian forces launching a Russian-made Iskander missile into Azerbaijan. The former Head of the Military Control Service of the Armenian MoD Movses Hakobyan, after resigning from his post on 19 November 2020, stated that Armenia used an Iskander missile on Azerbaijan, though he did not say where the missile hit. Armenia's Prosecutor General's office said in a Facebook post that it would investigate Hakobyan's allegations. A Defense Ministry spokeswoman didn't respond to phone calls seeking comment. According to Can Kasapoğlu, the Director of Security and Defense Studies Program at the Centre for Economics and Foreign Policy Studies, an Istanbul-based independent think-tank, Armenia could've used Iskander missiles only with the Russian consent. Azerbaijan and Russia denied that Armenia fired an Iskander during the war, however, according to the Middle East Eye, Armenia had fired at least one Russian-made Iskander ballistic missile at Azerbaijan's capital, Baku in November 2020 and they were shot down by a missile defence system operated by the Azerbaijani military. In March 2021, Azerbaijan National Agency for Mine Action (ANAMA) stated that Armenia had used Iskander missiles during the battle, adding that they found the remains of two exploded Iskander missiles during the demining of the area in Shusha; this was denied by Russia.

=== Wagner Group ===
On 28 September, Russian media reported that Russian private military companies were ready to fight against Azerbaijan in Nagorno-Karabakh. On 1 October, Radio Free Europe/Radio Liberty, citing a Wagner Group source, claimed they were already in Nagorno-Karabakh and participating in hostilities. The Russian military analyst Pavel Felgenhauer also stated that Wagner contractors were sent to support the Armenian forces as ATGM operators. After the war, in December 2020, a photo of a Wagner mercenary, apparently taken in front a church in Shusha during the war, appeared on the internet. Also, the Russian media leaked a message, apparently describing how the Armenian government refused to pay the Russian mercenaries for their work, and how, because of that, some of the Wagner mercenaries intended to return to Russia or defect to the Azerbaijani side. The Russian media reported that, in November, there were about 500 Russian mercenaries fighting on the Armenian side, and some 300 Russian mercenaries had taken part in the Battle of Shusha, with Victor Zlobov, a retired captain of the Russian Armed Forces, stating that Shusha was "defended mainly thanks to the Russian volunteers".

The Russian businessman Yevgeny Prigozhin, who founded Wagner Group in 2014, denied any involvement of the Russian PMCs in the war. According to the Armenian journalist Karine Ghazaryan, writing for Bellingcat, there was not "any firm evidence showing their arrival or involvement in the war". She stated that Reverse Side of the Medal (RSOTM), a media channel linked to Wagner Group, which, according to Ghazaryan, was the main source of the reports, was not the "breaking news source."

== Turkey and Syrian National Army ==
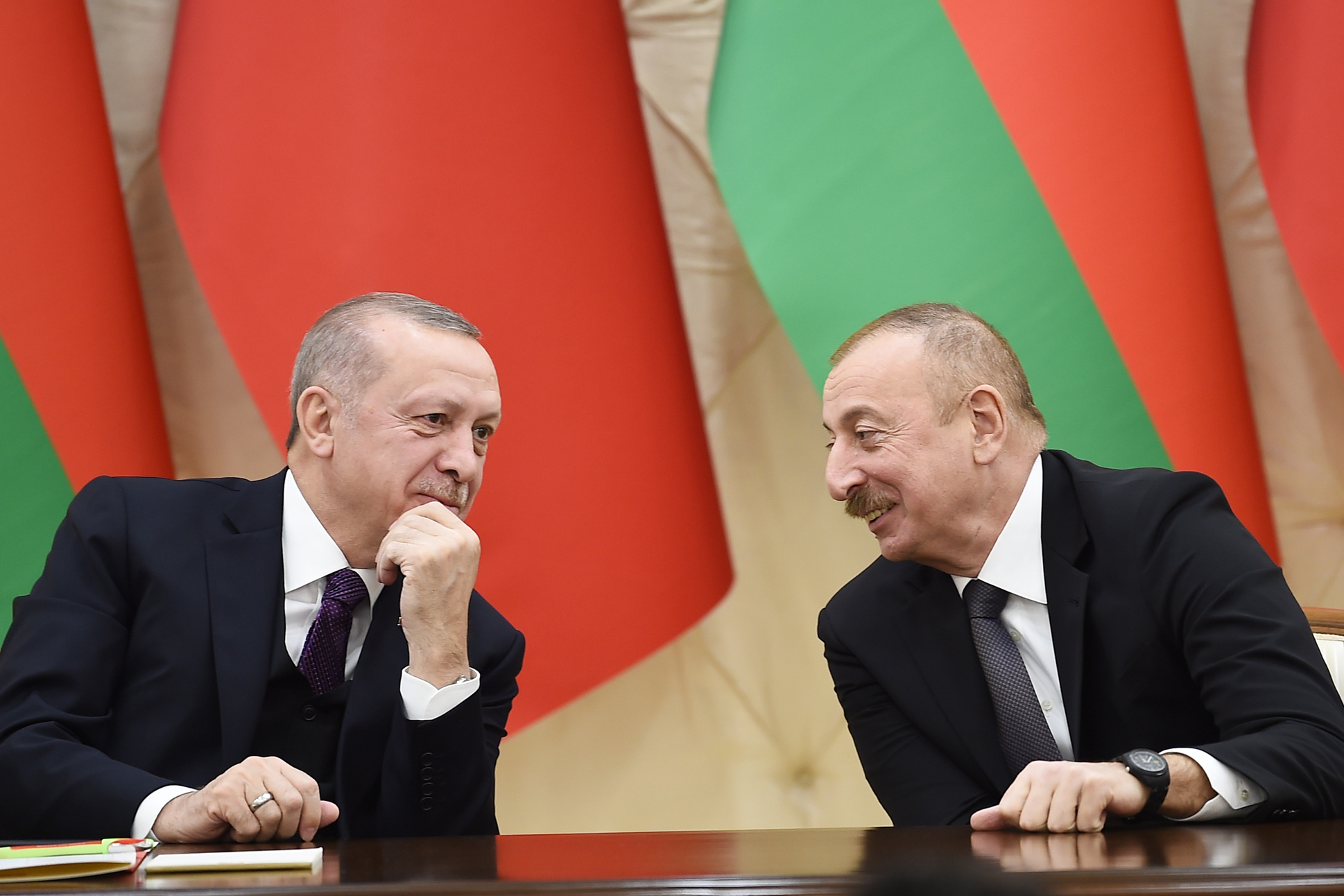
Recep Tayyip Erdogan with Ilham Aliyev on a 2020 visit to Baku.

Prior to the beginning of the conflict, Turkey's upped rhetoric against Armenia, as well as its recruitment of several hundred Syrian refugees had been reported the previous week by Syrian commentators, activists and others on social media, circulated among Syrian refugees, dissidents and others who monitor Syria. Detailed reporting on the evidence of Syrian fighters in Azerbaijan exists, as well as apparent Turkish military involvement, causing international concern. Two days into the conflict, several Syrian National Army (SNA) members and the SOHR reported that a private Turkish security company was recruiting Syrians to fight in Artsakh; Azerbaijan and Turkey issued denials. France24, The Independent and The Guardian have reported evidence of Syrian mercenaries recruited in Syria by Turkey to fight alongside the Azerbaijani servicemen in Nagorno-Karabakh. A report in The Times partially confirmed Turkish involvement in sending 200 Syrian fighters to support Azerbaijani forces; a Turkish-based source reported that these were acting independently of the SNA.

Turkish Defense Minister Hulusi Akar made threats to Armenia following the July 2020 Armenian–Azerbaijani clashes and stated, "Azerbaijan is not alone. Let everyone know that we are one nation." Russian newspaper Kommersant claimed to have sources confirming that Akar arrived in Baku between 28 and 30 September and oversaw all operations during the war. Lieutenant General Şeref Öngay was in Azerbaijan during September to conduct joint Azerbaijani-Turkish tactical exercises. Adnan Tanrıverdi, a former Turkish general, is the founder the SADAT Inc. International Defense Consultancy that has been responsible for recruiting, equipping, and transporting the Syrian mercenaries. On 4 March 2021, Lieutenant General Osman Erbaş was killed in a military helicopter crash. Turan Information Agency stated that Erbaş was of the masterminds behind drones strategy used by Azerbaijan in the second war.

Emmanuel Macron accused Turkey of dispatching Syrian jihadists to Nagorno-Karabakh via Gaziantep while Russia expressed concern over "illegal armed units" from Syria and Libya being present in the conflict zone. Syrian President Bashar al-Assad reiterated Macron's concerns. On 3 October 2020, Armenian Prime Minister Nikol Pashinyan stated that Syrian fighters, together with Turkish army specialists, were involved, along with circa 150 senior Turkish military officers, allegedly directing military operations. The National Security Service of Armenia presented intercepts, allegedly between the Turkish and Azerbaijani military, and between the Azerbaijani military and mercenaries. U.S. Secretary of State Mike Pompeo stated that Turkey's involvement in the conflict between Azerbaijan and Armenia has increased the risk in the region, inflaming the situation by arming the Azerbaijanis.

On 2 October 2020, Russian investigative newspaper Novaya Gazeta reported 700–1,000 militants had apparently been sent to Azerbaijan and detailed their transport and recruitment itinerary, referring to the Hamza Division and the Samarkand and Nureddin Zinki Brigades. The Georgian State Security Service stated news about the passage of Syrian fighters from Turkey through Georgia to Azerbaijan was disinformation. On 3 October 2020, Elizabeth Tsurkov, an American expert on Syria, reported on videos of Arabic-speaking foreigners, who she identified as likely Syrian mercenaries in Horadiz, urging compatriots to join them. Subsequently, Tsurkov detailed the recruitment, by the Hamza Division and Sultan Murad and Sultan Suleyman Shah Brigades, of at least a thousand mercenaries to Azerbaijan, including civilians with no fighting experience who had been informed they would be guarding oil facilities but were then sent to the front. On 5 October 2020, Russian News Agency RIA Novosti stated that 322 Syrian mercenaries were in the conflict zone and that 93 had been killed, while 430 from Syria had already arrived. On 6 October 2020, Russia's Foreign Intelligence Service alleged that several thousand fighters from Middle East terrorist organisations had arrived in Nagorno-Karabakh to fight for Azerbaijan, specifically from Jabhat al-Nusra (al-Qaeda branch), Firkat Hamza, and the Sultan Murad Division, stating all were linked to the Islamic State (ISIL). On 7 October 2020, Asia Times reported that mercenaries allegedly signed up to go to Azerbaijan for US$1,500 a month. Kommersant states that during the first week of October up to 1,300 Syrian militants and 150 Libyan mercenaries deployed to Azerbaijan.

On 16 October 2020, Kommersant provided details of Turkish military involvement. Turkish servicemen had apparently remained in Azerbaijan after joint military drills during the summer, to coordinate and direct the planning and conducting of the operations. Six hundred servicemen had stayed on, including a tactical battalion of 200 people, 50 instructors in Nakhchivan, 90 military advisers in Baku, 120 flight personnel at the airbase in Qabala; 20 drone operators at Dollyar Air Base, 50 instructors at the aviabase in Yevlakh, 50 instructors in the 4th Army Corps in Perekeshkul and 20 others at the naval base and Azerbaijan Higher Military Academy in Baku. According to the source, forces included 18 Turkish infantry fighting vehicles, one multiple launch rocket system, 10 vehicles and up to 34 aircraft, including 6 warplanes, 8 helicopters and up to 20 military intelligence drones.

On 10 August 2020, six Turkish F-16s from the Turkish Air Force traveled from Turkey to Azerbaijan to participate in the TurAz Qartali-2020 exercise. Some news sources determined through satellite images that these planes did not leave Azerbaijan when the Second Karabakh War began and remained at Ganja airport. Azerbaijani President Aliyev confirmed that the planes were in the country but stated that they did not participate in the conflict. In contrast, Aliyev said, "In the event of an external attack on Azerbaijan, you will see Turkish planes in the sky." Armenia claimed that a SU-25 fighter jet from its air force was shot down by Turkish F-16s, but Turkey and Azerbaijan denied this.

Canada suspended the export of its drone technology to Turkey over concerns that it is using the technology in the conflict. On 11 January 2021, after being approached by the Embassy of Armenia, Hampshire-based UK aircraft component manufacturer Andair announced halting supply of Turkish drone manufacturer Baykar Makina – a subsidiary of Turkish Defence Company Baykar, as they were using components from Andair for armed drones. The British manufacturer became the latest company to stop selling equipment to Turkey after its components were found in drones shot down during the Nagorno-Karabakh conflict.

At the start of the conflict, according to the SOHR, a total of 320 Syrian fighters were in Azerbaijan, primarily of Syrian-Turkmen descent from the Sultan Murad Division, and initially had not participated in the fighting. It stated that Arab-majority Syrian rebel groups had in fact refused to send their fighters to Azerbaijan. However, the SOHR confirmed the deaths of 28 fighters several days after the start of the conflict. On 3 December 2020, the SOHR stated that at least 541 pro-Turkey Syrian rebel fighters, who were among more than 2,580 combatants, had been killed in the war. An unidentified SNA leader, The Guardian and The Washington Post confirmed the deaths of dozens of Syrian fighters, most of them hired by Turkey. Prime Minister Pashinyan in an interview given to French newspaper Le Figaro wrote that 30% of Azerbaijani forces killed in hostilities were foreign mercenaries.

On 27 January 2021, the European Parliament adopted a resolution in which it strongly condemned Turkey's "destabilizing role" in the Nagorno-Karabakh conflict, accusing Ankara of sending foreign terrorist fighters from Syria and elsewhere to the conflict zone as confirmed by international actors, including the OSCE Minsk Group co-chair countries, and called for an end to Turkish military aid to Azerbaijan. On 11 March 2021, the European Parliament adopted another resolution in which it has strongly condemned the use of Syrian mercenaries in conflicts in Libya and Nagorno-Karabakh, in violation of international law.

Azerbaijani officials, including President Aliyev and his aid Hikmet Hajiyev, denied the transfer of Syrian mercenaries, with Hajiyev stating that "Rumours of militants from Syria allegedly being redeployed to Azerbaijan is another provocation by the Armenian side." In December 2020, Nezavisimaya Gazeta and Rosbalt questioned "the sources of information" regarding the participation of Syrian mercenaries in the war, pointing to the study by the Caspian and Black Sea Analysis Foundation (CCBS), a Bulgaria-based analytical center, which mentioned that the accusations were based on messages from social media users, and also suggested that the first publication on this matter was done on 21 September by Kevork Almasyan of whose statement was then used by adding random photos of Syrian fighters as evidence. CCBS further mentioned that even the photograph of a deceased soldier (Serdar Temelli), who had died during the Turkish Operation Tiger Claw in northern Iraq, was used to illustrate the mercenaries in Karabakh. ANNA News correspondent Alexander Kharchenko, who reported from the Armenian positions during the war, in an interview he gave to Vladimir Solovyov on 14 November 2020, stated that he only saw and talked to Azerbaijani POWs, adding that he did not see any Syrian militants or Turkish special forces in the battlefield, and that the Armenians did not show him any documentation of third-party involvement on the Azerbaijani side.

According to a researcher and Turkologist Viktor Nadein-Raevsky, the Azerbaijani army was commanded by Turkish generals, and during the war, drones were also commanded by Turkish generals.

In his annual report on state institutions operating under the Presidency at parliament's Planning and Budget Committee on 26 November 2021, Turkey's vice-president Fuat Oktay stated that Turkey's National Intelligence Organization (Milli İstihbarat Teşkilatı, MİT) played an active role in the Nagorno-Karabakh war in 2020, helping to shape the balances in the field. This first-ever official confirmation came to support the earlier statement of Head of the Russian Foreign Intelligence Service Sergey Naryshkin who on 6 November 2020 stated that Turkish intelligence agency was involved in the Second Nagorno-Karabakh War.

== Arms supplies ==
=== Israel ===
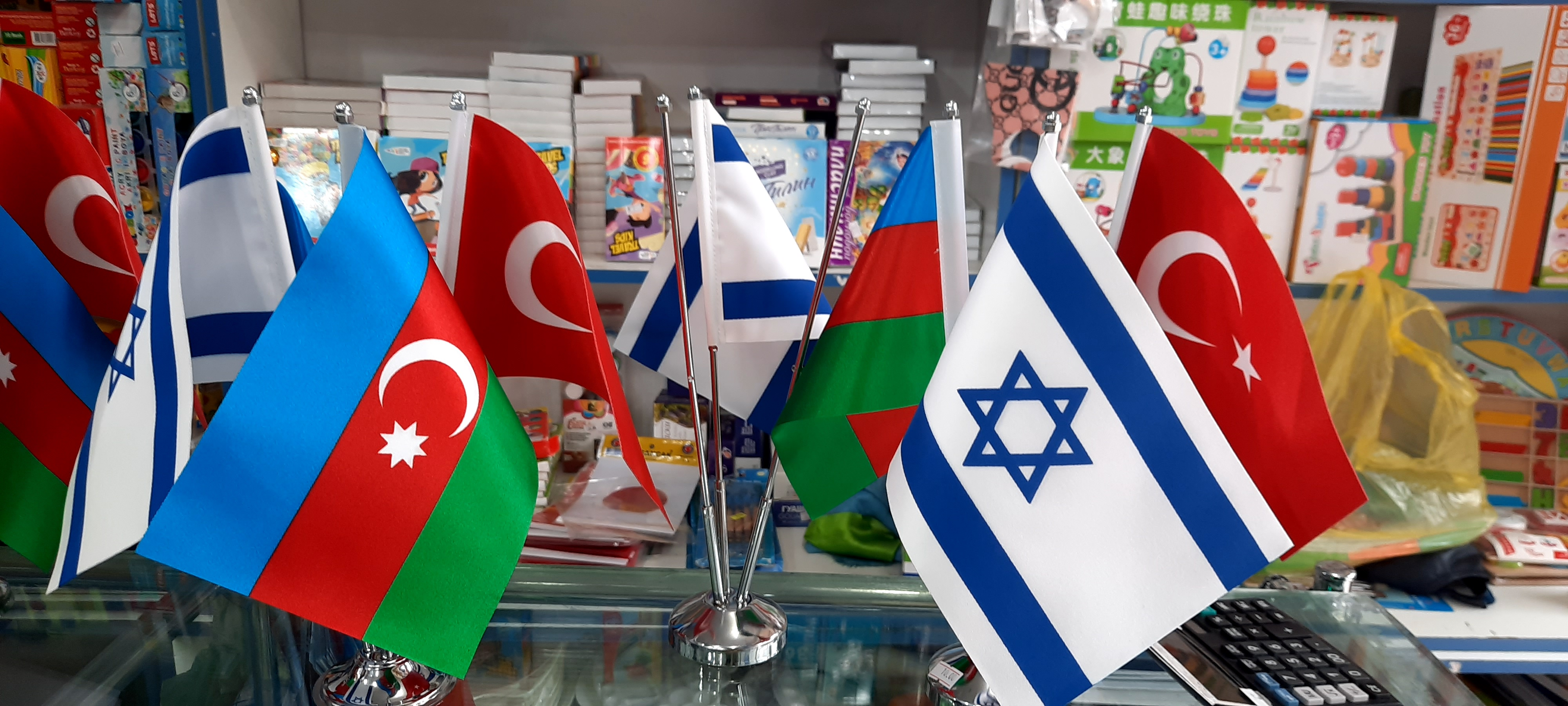
Azerbaijani, Turkish and Israeli flags in Baku in October 2020

According to the Stockholm International Peace Research Institute (STIPI), Israel provided nearly two-thirds of all arms imports to Azerbaijan over 2020, which, according to STIPI, have had a significant influence on how the Second Nagorno-Karabakh War was fought. The institute stated that Israel had provided the IAI Harop, as well as M095 DPICM cluster munitions that were declared illegal by the Convention on Cluster Munitions in 2008.

Israel was reported by the Saudi-owned Al-Arabiya to have continued shipping weapons, especially drones, during the war. "Azerbaijan would not be able to continue its operation at this intensity without our support," an unnamed "senior source" reportedly in the Israeli Ministry of Defense said in an interview with Asia Times. "Azerbaijan is an important country for us; we always try to be a good supplier even during times of tension, we have to make sure that we will honor the contracts we make with Azerbaijan," Efraim Inbar, president of the Jerusalem Institute for Strategy and Security told Times of Israel. Israeli newspaper Haaretz reported to have flagged significant airlift of arms and supplies from Israel to Azerbaijan during the conflict.

In an interview with David Barsamian of Alternative Radio, American scientist and political activist Noam Chomsky said that "The immediate crisis came when Azerbaijan, surely with Turkish backing [and] Israeli arms pouring in [attacked Armenia]" and that this aid came from "Ben Gurion airport in Israel, [with] Ilyushin planes coming in and out, while no other planes are flying into Baku" and that they were "sending Israeli arms to Azerbaijan so they can kill people, Armenians in Nagorno-Karabakh". In an open letter on 5 October, a group of Israeli scholars of Caucasian and associated studies from different institutions called upon the Israeli government to "immediately cease arms sales to Azerbaijan", followed by the World Union of Jewish Students (WUJS) statement on 15 October calling on the Israeli government "to cease all exports of weapons to Azerbaijan while the conflict is ongoing, and instead to play a role as a peace-seeking mediator."

=== Russia, Iran and Georgia ===
During the conflict, unverified video footage that reportedly showed Russian weaponry and military hardware being transported to Armenia through Iran were posted on social media. On 29 September 2020, the Iranian Foreign Ministry denied these reports. The next day, Azerbaijani government-affiliated media outlets shared footage reportedly showing the materiel being transported. Azerbaijani MP Sabir Rustamkhanli stated that Iran was engaged in transporting weapons from various countries to Armenia. Subsequently, in the Azerbaijani Parliament, Rustamkhanli suggested opening an Azerbaijani embassy in Israel. The Chief of Staff of the President of Iran, in a phone call with the Deputy Prime Minister of Azerbaijan, denied the reports and stated that they were aimed at disrupting the two countries' relations. Iranian state-affiliated media stated that trucks depicted in the footage consisted of shipments of Kamaz trucks that the Armenian government had previously purchased from Russia.

Azerbaijan's president initially stated that Georgia had not allowed the transportation of weapons through its territory and thanked Georgia, as a partner and friend. However, in a subsequent interview, he stated that Armenia was misusing one of its Il-76 cargo planes for civil flights, to secretly transport fighters and Kornet anti-tank missiles from Russia through Georgian airspace into Armenia. Georgia responded by stating that its airspace was closed to all military and military cargo flights but not for civil and humanitarian ones.

A senior Armenian military official colonel-general Movses Hakobyan, who resigned his post after the war, said that Russia delivered military supplies to Armenia during the war.

=== Serbia ===
Azerbaijan stated that Armenia employed Serbian weapons, alleged to have been transported via Georgia. In response, the President of Serbia, Aleksandar Vučić, stated that Serbia considered both Armenia and Azerbaijan to be friends and "brotherly nations", insisting that Serbian weapons were not used in Nagorno-Karabakh. Armenian sources, however, claimed that Serbia exported armaments to both countries.

=== Belarus ===
On August 26, 2025, it was revealed through leaked documents that the government of Belarus despite also being a member of the CSTO alongside Armenia, not only sent military equipment, namely air defense missiles, to Azerbaijan during the 2020 Karabakh war, but also sent Belarusian advisors to Azerbaijan to help upgrade their army, and train its troops to use the new equipment through an intermediary, the private arms firm Tetraedr, with Belarusian army personnel posing as Tetraedr employees. Tetraedr had 16 contracts to work with the Azeri military, with two being worth an estimated $13 million, and 6 of them not being signed with the Azeri government, but instead a shell company registered in the British Virgin Islands to circumvent arms trafficking treaties. Although the Virgin Islands have a secrecy law on the ownership of companies registered in their territory, these listings would also be leaked, showing the company, N.P.O. Navigation Systems, as being jointly owned by Azeri and Israeli businessmen connected to the Azeri government.

== See also ==
- Mercenary
- Plausible deniability
- Political warfare
- Unconventional warfare
