= Operation Claw-Lock =

2022 Turkish military incursion in Iraq

- Part of the Kurdistan Workers' Party insurgency
Date	17 April 2022 – February 2024
Location	Metina, Zap and Avashin Basyan regions, Duhok, Kurdistan Region, Iraq
Status	Operation successful

Belligerents
Turkey; Supported by: Kurdistan Region: KDP	Kurdistan Communities Union (KCK): PKK

Commanders and leaders
(Turkey) Recep Tayyip Erdoğan (Turkey) Atilla Gülan (Turkey) Hulusi Akar (Turkey) Yaşar Güler	Cemîl Bayik Murat Karayılan

Units involved
(Turkey) Turkish Armed Forces: Special Forces Command; Turkish Air Force	PKK: HPG

Strength
(Turkey) ~15,000 personnel: 50+ F-16s C/D; T129 ATAK; UH-60 Black Hawk; CH-47 Chinook; KC-135 Stratotanker; Boeing 737 AEW&C; Bayraktar Akıncı; Bayraktar TB2; TAI Anka	Unknown

Casualties and losses
83 killed 145 KIAs and 47 DOWs (per Sözcü)	995 killed or captured (AA estimate)
- 8 civilians killed and 20+ civilians injured

Operation Claw-Lock (Turkish: Pençe-Kilit Operasyonu) was a military operation of the Turkish Armed Forces in northern Iraq. The operation was taking place in the Duhok Governorate against the Kurdistan Workers' Party (PKK), as part of the ongoing Kurdish–Turkish conflict.

== Background ==
The Turkish Armed Forces have been conducting cross-border military operations against the Kurdistan Workers' Party (PKK) in Northern Iraq since the 1980s. Since 2019, Turkey has begun conducting operations codenamed Claw, including Claw Eagle and Tiger in 2020 and Claw-Lighting and Thunderbolt in 2021. According to Turkish Defense Minister Hulusi Akar, the current operation targets positions in the areas Metina, Zap and Avashin and is carried out in cooperation with their allies.

Before the operation was launched, Turkish President Recep Tayyip Erdoğan met with the Prime Minister of the Kurdistan Regional Government, Masrour Barzani, and according to Al-Monitor briefed the latter on the operation.

Turkish authorities said that the objective of the operation was to prevent a major attack by the PKK. Ömer Çelik of the Justice and Development Party (AKP) reasoned the PKK planned to establish new bases near the border of Turkey and defended the cross-border military operations into neighboring countries like Iraq or Syria as self defense enshrined within Article 51 of the Charter of the United Nations.

== Operation ==
At the start of the operation, Turkish aircraft bombed several Kurdish villages in Duhok. The ground incursion began on 18 April 2022, with the support of artillery, drones and aircraft. Airstrikes struck caves, tunnels and ammunition depots controlled by the PKK while Turkish Special Forces entered the region by land or were airlifted by helicopters. While the Turkish Defense Ministry announced that fifty targets were hit and all their initial objectives were achieved, the PKK claimed to have repulsed some of the Turkish landing attempts. A PKK affiliated source reported that helicopters used in the operation were based within the Kurdistan Region (KRI). On the 22 April 2022, the Turkish Air Force extended the operation, flying sorties to the Sulaymaniyah province in the KRI against suspected PKK positions.

On 20 July, Iraqi Kurdish officials said that Turkey had shelled a resort in Zakho District, killing at least eight tourists and wounding more than 20 civilians. Among the dead were reported to be a woman and a child.

== Reactions ==
=== In Turkey ===
The Peoples Democratic Party (HDP) considers the operation as being contrary to international law, and accused Turkey of hypocrisy for presenting itself as a peacemaker in the war between Russia and Ukraine. In October 2022, the HDP and Şebnem Korur Fincancı, the head of the Turkish Medical Association (TTB) both called for an investigation into the claims of chemical attacks by the Turkish army. Due to this demand, Korur Fincanci was arrested and prosecuted for terrorist propaganda. The MP Sezgin Tanrikulu of the Republican People's Party (CHP) is threatened with losing his parliamentary immunity for attempting to verify the authenticity of the images he had seen of the alleged chemical attack in the Turkish parliament.

=== In Iraq ===
Iraqi President Barham Salih condemned the attack and demanded Turkey to end the operation and withdraw all of its forces from Iraqi territory deeming it a "threat to our national security". The Iraqi foreign minister said the operation was a violation of Iraq's sovereignty. Muqtada al-Sadr, the leader of the largest faction in parliament said that if Turkey has security concerns, it should discuss them with the Iraqi Government and considered its military strong enough to take care of the issue.

Senior PKK commander Duran Kalkan called on Turkey to immediately halt its operation, threatening that otherwise it would "move the war to Turkish cities". On the 19 May, the Iraqi Ambassador to the United Nations Security Council Hussein Bahr Aluloom filed a formal complaint before the council and called for the withdrawal of the Turkish military as the presence of the PKK should be taken a pretext to remain to Iraqi territory for the Turkish army. In an interview with Norwegian newspaper Verdens Gang, PKK spokesman Zagros Hiwa accused Turkey of attempting to fashion "a new kind of Ottoman Empire", and that Erdogan represented an "expansionist, Ottoman mentality".

=== Impact on Iraq-Turkey relations ===
Erdogan claimed to have the approval of both the Kurdistan Regional Government (KRG) and Iraq during a speech in the Turkish Parliament, this however, was rebuked by officials of the Ministry of the Peshmerga of the KRG as well as the Iraqi Government which denied the operation was in line with Article 51 of the UN Charter. Both countries summoned each other's corresponding diplomats. The Turkish ambassador to Iraq was summoned to the Iraqi foreign ministry and delivered a diplomatic note demanding the end of the operation, claiming the presence of the PKK in Iraq was in accordance of an agreement between Turkey and the PKK. The Iraqi envoy to Turkey was summoned to convey Turkey's displeasure with "unfounded allegations" following Erdogan's speech in the Turkish parliament.

=== International ===
In the United Kingdom Kurdish people egged Masrour Barzani's convoy for not having made any statement regarding the Turkish military operation. Rallies against the operation were also held in Marseille, France and several cities in Germany. In Frankfurt the police confiscated several flags of the Syrian Peoples Defense Units (YPG), the Women's Protection Units (YPJ) and flags in with the colors Green, Yellow and Red. In May, German Minister of Food and Agriculture Cem Özdemir compared Turkey's behavior to that of Russia, in that whenever they had problems in the interior, such as a trailing economy or a difficult political situation, they resort to creating international conflicts instead of trying to enhance bilateral relations with neighboring countries.

== See also ==
- Operation Claw-Eagle 2
