= March 2016 Turkish incursion into northern Iraq =

Operation of the Turkish Air Forces

- Part of the Kurdish–Turkish conflict and the War in Iraq (2013–2017)
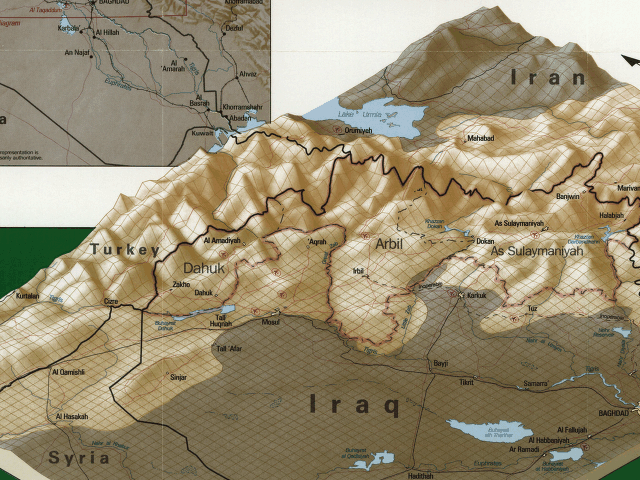
- 3D map of the North Iraq area
| Date | March 18–19, 2016 |
| Location | northern Iraq |
| Result | Turkish victory |

Belligerents
| Turkey | PKK |

Commanders and leaders
| (Turkey) Hulusi Akar (Turkey) Abidin Ünal | Murat Karayılan; Cemil Bayık; Bahoz Erdal |

Strength
| March 18: 20 war planes March 19: 10 war planes | Unknown |

The March 2016 Turkish incursion into northern Iraq, by the Turkish Air Forces, began on 18 March 2016, when the Turkish Military bombed Kurdistan Workers' Party (PKK) targets in northern Iraq in response to the February 2016 and March 2016 bombings in the Turkish capital city of Ankara.

== Timeline ==
=== March 18 ===
Operation on 18 March 2016 started at 20:40 with 20 airplanes targeting ammunition dumps and shelters owned by PKK around Great Zab. The operation was successful and Turkish Armed Forces stated that all targets were destroyed until 22:00.

=== March 19 ===
Operation on 19 March 2016 started at 06:50 with 10 airplanes against a large group of exposed militias and several pillboxes owned by PKK in Hakurk. Turkish Armed Forces claimed operation was successful and stated that all targets were destroyed by 07:40.
