= Operations Claw-Eagle and Tiger =

Turkish military operation

Operations Claw-Eagle and Claw-Tiger
- Part of the Kurdish–Turkish conflict and Kurdish–Iranian conflict
Date	15 June 2020 – 5 September 2020 (2 months and 3 weeks)
Location	Kurdistan Region, Iraq

Belligerents
Turkey; Supported by: Iran (Artillery support)	Kurdistan Workers' Party; PJAK

Commanders and leaders
(Turkey) Recep Tayyip Erdoğan (Turkey) Hasan Küçükakyüz (Turkey) Ali Özmen (Turkey) Hulusi Akar (Turkey) Yaşar Güler	Cemîl Bayik Murat Karayılan

Units involved
Turkish Armed Forces: Turkish Air Force; Turkish Land Forces; Ministry of the Interior: Gendarmerie General Command	KCK: HPG; Free Women's Units; YBŞ; YRK; HPJ

Strength
Unknown personnel: 36 F-16s C/D; 12 F-4 Terminator; ≥1 Boeing 737 AEW&C; Anka drones; Bayraktar TB2 drones; T129 ATAK helicopters	Unknown

Casualties and losses
5 killed (per Turkey) 196 killed (per PKK)	83 killed or captured (per Turkey) 51 killed (per PKK)
- 7 civilians killed

The joint Claw-Eagle and Claw-Tiger operations (Turkish: Pençe-Kartal Operasyonu and Pençe-Kaplan Operasyonu) was a Turkish Armed Forces external operation in northern Iraq. The operation took place in the Qandil Mountains, the Sinjar District, and Makhmur, against Kurdistan Workers' Party (PKK) targets, as part of the ongoing Kurdish–Turkish and Kurdish–Iranian conflicts. Claw-Eagle, the air campaign, began on 15 June 2020. Claw-Tiger, the ground campaign, was launched on 17 June.

== Background ==
As part of the 2013–2015 peace talks, the Kurdistan Workers' Party agreed to move most of its fighters to the mountains in Iraqi Kurdistan. The Turkish Armed Forces also established bases in Iraq which sparked regional and international condemnation. The conflict reignited once more in June 2015, accompanied by ongoing Turkish involvement in the Syrian Civil War and harassment of Kurdish parties in Turkey.

== Operation Claw-Eagle ==
Turkish Armed Forces bombed Sinjar and destroyed multiple PKK camps near Yezedi villages. According to the locals, there were fears of ethnic cleansing and genocide by the Turkish State towards Yezidi's.

The Turkish government claimed that fighter jets destroyed caves in the Qandil Mountains used by the PKK. The airstrikes also struck near Makhmour refugee camp, which hosts thousands of Turkish Kurd refugees who fled the conflict in the 1990s, as well as Yezidi villages in Sinjar. The Turkish Ministry of National Defense released a video of the airstrikes, claiming 81 targets were destroyed. On 25 June, a drone strike killed one or two PKK fighters outside a shop in Kuna Masi north of Sulaymaniyah, and injured six nearby civilians in the marketplace (two men, two women, and two children). Four of the wounded are in serious condition in Qalachwan Hospital.

== Operation Claw-Tiger ==
On 17 June, Turkish Land Forces launched a ground operation in the Haftanin region of Iraqi Kurdistan. Units of the Hakkari Mountain and Commando Brigade and 1st Commando Brigade were airlifted across the Iraq–Turkey border.

== Iranian cooperation ==
On 16 June, the Iranian military shelled the Choman area of the Qandil Mountains, an attack that is believed to have been coordinated with the simultaneous Turkish airstrikes. The collaboration is said to materialize known alliances between Turkey and Iran.

== Domestic reactions ==
=== Iraq ===
The parliament of the Kurdistan region criticized the attacks while Iraq demanded that Turkey stops violating the Iraqi airspace and terrorizing the population in the area.

In August 2020, Iraq canceled a ministerial meeting and summoned the Turkish ambassador as Iraq blamed Turkey for a drone strike that killed two high-ranking Iraqi military officers. Officials called it a "blatant Turkish drone attack" in the autonomous Kurdish region in northern Iraq.

== International reactions ==
=== UN-member countries ===
In June 2020, the United States Commission on International Religious Freedom accused Turkey that it threatened Yazidis families who attempted to return to their homes in the Sinjar. Turkey rejected the claims.

=== International organizations ===
The Arab League condemned the operation based on violation of Iraq's sovereign space. Turkey criticized the declaration, on the claim of PKK itself affecting Iraq's sovereignty.

=== Protests ===
Protests condemning the airstrikes were held in Duhok province but also in several countries in Europe. In London a Kurdish protester forced a car transporting Boris Johnson to stop in order to raise awareness to the situation of the Kurds in Iraqi Kurdistan.

== See also ==
- Operation Claw-Eagle 2
- Operations Claw-Lightning and Thunderbolt
- Operation Claw-Lock
