= Makhmur, Iraq =

Makhmur Arabic: مخمور
- Town
- Makhmur
- Location in Iraq
- Coordinates: 35°46′32″N 43°34′46″E
- Country: Iraq
- Governorate: Nineveh Governorate
- District: Makhmur District
- Elevation: 254 m (833 ft)

Population (2012)
  - Total: 23,828
- Time zone: UTC+3 (AST)

Makhmur (Arabic: مخمور, romanized: Maẖmūr, Kurdish: مەخموور, romanized: Mexmûr) is a town in Makhmur District, Nineveh Governorate, Iraq. It is situated strategically approximately 60 km southwest of Erbil as well as 80 km north-east of Kirkuk and 80 km south-east of Mosul.

== Background ==
During the 2014 IS crisis, the town was captured by IS militants. A volunteer civilian militia to defend the town was created in response. The town was then reclaimed by the Iraqi Army in October 2017.

During the 2017 Iraqi–Kurdish conflict, clashes were reported on the outskirts of the town between Kurdish Peshmerga forces and the Iraqi army, supported by the Popular Mobilization Forces (also known as Hashd al-Shaabi), until it was fully recaptured by the latter. During October 19, 2023, the PKK withdrew their forces in the Makhmur refugee camp. The Iraqi army advanced to the military posts of the PKK in the camp, which overlapped with the controlled territory of the Kurdistan Regional Government. This led to the 2023 Makhmur clashes, in which, six people died, and four of them were Peshmergas. The result of the war was a ceasefire between both sides, in which both sides agreed to share the military posts.

== Refugee camp ==
Situated in the Makhmur District is the Makhmur refugee camp, which was founded in 1998. Around 12,000 Kurdish refugees, who fled the Kurdish-Turkish conflict in the 1990s, live in this refugee camp.

In 2022, it was subjected to drone strikes by the Turkish state.
