= Operation Claw-Eagle 2 =

2021 Turkish military operation

- Part of the Kurdish–Turkish conflict
Date	10–14 February 2021 (4 days)
Location	Gara Mountain, Duhok Governorate, Kurdistan Region, northern Iraq
Result	Rescue operation failed

Belligerents
Turkey	Kurdistan Workers' Party (PKK)

Commanders and leaders
Hulusi Akar (Minister of National Defense of Turkey); Gen. Yaşar Güler (Chief of Staff of the Turkish Armed Forces); Gen. Ümit Dündar (Commander of the Turkish Land Forces); Gen. Hasan Küçükakyüz (Commander of the Turkish Air Force)	Şoreş Beytüşşebap † (Commander at Gara Prison Camp)

Units involved
Turkish Armed Forces: Turkish Air Force; Turkish Land Forces	Kurdistan Workers' Party (PKK): People's Defence Forces (HPG)

Strength
(Turkey) 900–3,900: 11 Boeing CH-47 Chinooks; 41 other aircraft	Unknown

Casualties and losses
3 killed, 3 wounded (per Turkey); 37+ killed, dozens wounded (per PKK)	51 killed, 2 captured (per Turkey); 15 killed, 2 captured (per PKK)
- 12 Turkish and 1 Iraqi hostages killed (responsibility disputed) (Note: Turkey and the United States hold that PKK executed the hostages. The PKK blames Turkey for the deaths. Originally claiming the hostages were killed by Turkish bombing, the PKK later stated that Turkey used poison gas that resulted in the death of the hostages, who were subsequently shot to place blame on the PKK.)

Operation Claw-Eagle 2 (Turkish: Pençe Kartal-2 Harekatı) was an air and ground operation launched by the Turkish Armed Forces against the Kurdistan Workers' Party (PKK) in the Duhok Governorate of the Kurdistan Region of northern Iraq. According to Turkey, it was launched to secure the border between Turkey and Iraq and to eliminate the PKK in the area and to rescue Turkish hostages held by the PKK.

== Background ==
In January 2021, prior to the operation, Turkish Minister of National Defense Hulusi Akar visited both the Kurdistan Region and the Iraqi capital Baghdad to announce that Turkey intends to eliminate the PKK from Iraq and to seek cooperation from the two governments. Turkey has previously launched several other operations against the PKK in the region.

== Operation ==
The operation targeted a 75 by 25 kilometer area on the Gare mountain, a transit area for PKK fighters to cross from Iraq to Turkey, about 50 kilometers northeast of Duhok city. The Turkish Air Force, using fighter jets and attack helicopters, launched airstrikes at 02:55 and claimed to have simultaneously destroyed more than 50 PKK targets in the area which encompasses 6 villages, including air raid shelters, ammunition depots, and headquarters. A local mayor disputed this claim and claimed that the airstrikes only damaged vineyards and other agricultural fields. Civilians, mostly farmers, from the affected villages all left before the airstrikes while many animals were left behind.

Following the airstrikes, the ground attack began at 04:55 as Turkish commandos were airdropped near Siyanê village and engaged in fighting against People's Defence Forces (HPG) militants. Three Turkish soldiers were killed and three others were wounded during the initial clash, and clashes continued into the next day. On the third day, Turkish troops supported by airstrikes landed from helicopters, entered high-level protected Gare mountain bunker, and claimed to capture two HPG fighters during the fighting against 8 HPG fighters, the rest of which were killed and few of them tried to flee area with Paramotors. The Turkish Ministry of Defense claimed that in the bunker cave, its troops also discovered the bodies of 13 Turkish citizens who had been captured by the PKK. The Kurdistan Communities Union (KCK) claimed that the Turkish ground operation would not have been possible without permission or support from the Kurdistan Democratic Party which controls most of the region. KDP involvement was denied by both the KDP and HPG.

The Turkish Ministry of Defense announced on 14 February 2021 that the operation has been "successfully carried out in difficult land and climatic conditions", with Turkish forces returning to their bases, and that a total of 48 PKK fighters has been killed. 13 Turkish hostages and kidnapping victims held by the PKK were found dead in the cave, with 12 being shot in the head and one in the shoulder. The two PKK prisoners captured by Turkey claimed that the PKK executed the Turkish captives during the start of the operation. The US government was initially hesitant to accept Turkey's position, but eventually stated that the PKK was responsible for the death of those captives. Six Turkish soldiers and two police officers who were kidnapped in 2015 and 2016 were identified among the killed prisoners after autopsies of the bodies were conducted in Malatya Province. Turkish intelligence personnel were also reported among the dead. The PKK denied that it executed the hostages and kidnapping victims and claimed they died during the clashes. On the map announced by the General Staff the sketch of the bunker cave where the hostages were kept was exhibited.

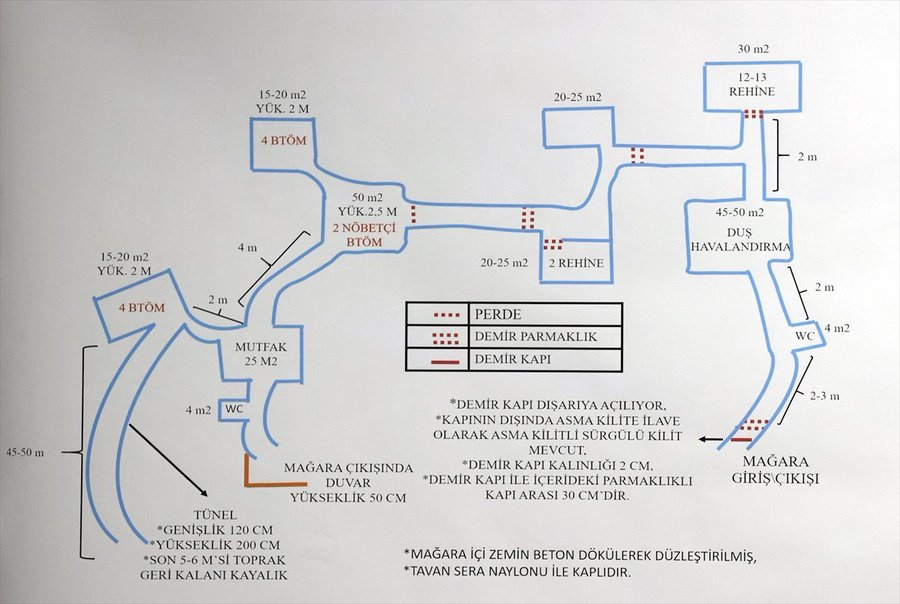
Gara Hostage Rescue Operation, cave sketch

According to the map, the prisoner section located in the depths of the cave was protected by steel doors and iron bars. When the soldiers explored the area, they noticed that the captives were killed. Turkish Security sources gave the following information about the weapons and ammunition seized in the cave, which the organization used as a prison and bunker shelter claiming: "2 RPG 7 anti-tank rockets of US and Russian origin, 2 Russian or Chinese Biksi (PK Machine Guns) 1 Russian origin Kalashnikov rifle, 1 sniper weapon Zagros-2, 1 US origin M16 A2 Carbine 727 model infantry rifle, 8x 30 stinger air defense missile, 1 thermal night vision scope, 1 night vision goggles, one 8 × 24 daytime sight handheld binoculars, 1 harness kit (tool used for weapon holding), 1 piece of daytime sight over gun, 1 piece of Kestrel (a device used by snipers to measure the wind), 1 calculator and 1 YAHESU shortcut handheld radio."

== Reaction ==
Turkish presidency media director Fahrettin Altun vowed to "chase down every last terrorist hiding in their caves and safe houses" and exact "painful" revenge and "swift" justice after the operation's conclusion. He and presidency spokesman İbrahim Kalın condemned the Western world's lack of response and Minister of Interior Affairs Süleyman Soylu threatened to tear PKK leader Murat Karayılan "into a thousand pieces".

Meanwhile, the pro-Kurdish Peoples' Democratic Party (HDP) expressed condolences to those killed during the operation and urged the PKK to release its remaining captives. Ankara's chief public prosecutor's office launched investigations into HDP MPs Hüda Kaya and Ömer Faruk Gergerlioğlu and others who claimed the prisoners were killed by Turkish bombardment and those who shared videos of these prisoners.

The main opposition party Republican People's Party stated that Erdoğan caused the deaths and failure of Turkish forces and that Erdoğan did not peacefully call for their release, calling the operation a "mess." The main opposition leader Kemal Kılıçdaroğlu stated that Erdoğan caused the failure, claiming that "normally someone should take responsibility and resign. You go to rescue hostages and they die. The person responsible for our 13 martyrs is Recep Tayyip Erdoğan." In response, Erdoğan sued Kılıçdaroğlu for 500,000 Turkish liras.

The Turkish Human Rights Association (İHD), who previously facilitated the return of hostages from the PKK, stated their offers to help negotiate were rejected by state officials. Chairman of the İHD, Öztürk Türkdoğan, said security officials were insistent on military operations, but also criticized the PKK for holding hostages for so long. The following month, Türkdoğan was arrested alongside a number of HDP officials. After objections from human rights groups such as Amnesty International, he was released.

== Responsibility ==
The PKK originally claimed the hostages were killed by the aerial bombing of the Turkish army. The autopsy report, however, confirmed that the hostages were shot in the head, and the relatives who were allowed to visit the morgue confirmed the reports that their hostage relatives were tortured and shot dead. While the United States originally appeared ambiguous about who it believed bore responsibility for the killings, Secretary of State Antony Blinken later stated that Washington views the PKK responsible. The PKK later revised their claim to say that Turkey used poison gas, resulting in the captives deaths, who were then "executed so that the blame could be put on us".

== See also ==
- Operation Steel
- Operation Hammer (1997)
- Operation Dawn (1997)
- Iraqi Kurdish Civil War
- Operations Claw-Lightning and Thunderbolt
- Operation Claw-Lock
