= Operations Claw-Lightning and Thunderbolt =

Turkish military incursion

- Part of the Kurdish–Turkish conflict
Date	23 April 2021 – 17 April 2022 (11 months, 3 weeks and 4 days)
Location	Metina, Zap and Avashin Basyan regions, Duhok and Erbil Governorate, Kurdistan Region, Iraq

Belligerents
Turkey Kurdistan Region (from 6 June 2021)	Kurdistan Workers' Party

Commanders and leaders
(Turkey) Recep Tayyip Erdoğan (Turkey) Hasan Küçükakyüz (Turkey) Ali Özmen (Turkey) Hulusi Akar (Turkey) Yaşar Güler (Kurdistan Region) Nechirvan Barzani	Cemîl Bayik; Murat Karayılan Sofi Nurettin †

Units involved
(Turkey) Turkish Armed Forces: Turkish Air Force; Turkish Land Forces; Ministry of the Interior: Gendarmerie General Command; (Kurdistan Region) Peshmerga; (Kurdistan Region) Zeravani; (Kurdistan Region) Asayish	KCK: HPG

Strength
(Turkey) Unknown personnel 50 aircraft including: F-16s C/D; F-4 Terminator; KC-135 Stratotanker; Boeing 737 AEW&C; T129 ATAK; CH-47 Chinook; UH-60 Black Hawk; Bayraktar TB2; TAI Anka; (Kurdistan Region) Unknown	Unknown

Casualties and losses
21 killed (per Turkey) (Kurdistan Region) 6 killed 7 wounded 2 captured	142 killed or captured (per Turkey)

Claw-Lightning and Claw-Thunderbolt (Turkish: Pençe-Şimşek ve Pençe-Yıldırım Operasyonları) were Turkish Armed Forces cross border military operations in northern Iraq. The operations took place in the Metina, Zap and Avashin-Basyan regions against Kurdistan Workers' Party (PKK) targets, as part of the ongoing Kurdish–Turkish conflict.

== Operations ==
The operations began on the evening of 23 April 2021, with air and howitzer strikes targeting PKK positions in Northern Iraq. In the following hours of the strikes Turkish paratroopers and commandos airdropped from Chinook and Black Hawk helicopters to the points of Metina, Zap and Avashin-Basyan regions. Turkish Defense Ministry announced the "neutralization" of 142 militants and the destruction of 500 targets while announcing 12 killed of their own.

== Clashes between PKK and Peshmerga ==
On 6 June 2021, clashes occurred between Peshmerga and PKK resulting in the deaths of 5 Peshmerga. On 8 June 2021, 2 Peshmerga were kidnapped by PKK while another one was killed.

== Civilian impact ==
The operation is known to have impact on civilians, fleeing the operation area.

== See also ==
- Operation Claw (2019–2020)
- Operations Claw-Eagle and Tiger
- Operation Claw-Eagle 2
- Operation Claw-Lock
