= List of assassinations of the Kurdish Workers' Party insurgency =

This is a list of assassinations of the Kurdistan Workers' Party insurgency, usually carried out by the Kurdistan Workers' Party (PKK) or the security forces of Turkey.

Date	Target	Attacker	Location	Result	Casualties	Comment
30 July 1979	Mehmet Celal Bucak	PKK	Hilvan, Şanlıurfa, Turkey	Assassination failed	5 killed, 2 wounded	Bucak was a Kurdish tribal leader and a member of the Turkish parliament. He was injured with his son when PKK militants under Cuma Tak tried to assassinate him.
22 October 1988	Esat Oktay Yıldıran	PKK	Ümraniye, Istanbul, Turkey	Assassination successful	1 killed	Yıldıran was a Turkish military officer who was responsible for torturing inmates in Diyarbakır Prison. He was shot dead on a public bus by a PKK militant.
7 July 1991	Vedat Aydın	Turkey	Maden, Turkey	Assassination successful	1 killed	Vedat Aydın was a leader of the Peoples' Labour Party and the Turkish Human Rights Association.
24 February 1992	Cengiz Altun	Turkey	Istanbul, Turkey	Assassination successful	1 killed	On 24 February 1992 Yeni Ülke journalist Cengiz Altun was assassinated. He had previously received death threats, and had written an article on the Counterguerrilla in the 2–8 February issue.
31 July 1992	Yahya Orhan	Turkey	Istanbul, Turkey	Assassination successful	1 killed	Journalist Yahya Orhan, who wrote for Özgür Gündem and Yeni Ülke, was assassinated on 31 July 1992.
20 September 1992	Musa Anter	Turkey	Diyarbakır, Turkey	Assassination successful	1 killed, 1 wounded	Anter was shot at a festival in 1992 by Turkish JITEM, in an incident in which the politician Orhan Miroğlu was seriously injured.
18 February 1993	Kemal Kılıç	Turkey	Istanbul, Turkey	Assassination successful	1 killed	Kemal Kılıç, a former correspondent for Özgür Gündem then writing for Yeni Ülke, was assassinated on 18 February 1993.
4 September 1993	Mehmet Sincar	Turkey	Batman, Turkey	Assassination successful	2 killed	Mehmet Sincar and Metin Özdemir were politicians of the Democracy Party investigating the murder of Vedat Aydın.
4 September 1993	Metin Özdemir	Turkey	Batman, Turkey	Assassination successful	2 killed	Mehmet Sincar and Metin Özdemir were politicians of the Democracy Party investigating the murder of Vedat Aydın.
6 July 2005	Hikmet Fidan	PKK	Bağlar, Diyarbakır, Turkey	Assassination successful	1 killed	Hikmet Fidan who worked as the senior general chairman for a long time in HADEP before the party was closed, was shot to death with a silencer in front of a building in Turkey.
17 July 2005	Hasan Özen	PKK	Vienna, Austria	Assassination successful	1 killed	PKK's representative of Austria; Hasan Özen was assassinated. Özen was against of Abdullah Öcalan's declarations and he wanted to leave the organization.
12 February 2006	Kani Yılmaz	PKK	Iraqi Kurdistan	Assassination successful	2 killed	PKK's former representative of Europe, Kani Yılmaz was assassinated by a bomb that was put into his car on 12 February. Yılmaz was burned to death in the car with a former PKK militant Sabri Tori.
9 January 2013	Sakine Cansız	Turkey	Paris, France	Assassination successful	3 killed	Sakine Cansız was one of the co-founders of the PKK. Leyla Söylemez was an area manager of the PKK youth organisation. Fidan Doğan was a Kurdish activist, who worked at the Kurdish information centre in Paris and also represented the Brussels-based Kurdish National Congress in France. They were shot dead in Paris on 9 January 2013.
9 January 2013	Leyla Söylemez	Turkey	Paris, France	Assassination successful	3 killed	Sakine Cansız was one of the co-founders of the PKK. Leyla Söylemez was an area manager of the PKK youth organisation. Fidan Doğan was a Kurdish activist, who worked at the Kurdish information centre in Paris and also represented the Brussels-based Kurdish National Congress in France. They were shot dead in Paris on 9 January 2013.
9 January 2013	Fidan Doğan	Turkey	Paris, France	Assassination successful	3 killed	Sakine Cansız was one of the co-founders of the PKK. Leyla Söylemez was an area manager of the PKK youth organisation. Fidan Doğan was a Kurdish activist, who worked at the Kurdish information centre in Paris and also represented the Brussels-based Kurdish National Congress in France. They were shot dead in Paris on 9 January 2013.
22 July 2015	Okan Acar	PKK (alleged by Turkey)	Ceylanpınar, Şanlıurfa, Turkey	Assassination successful	2 killed	On 22 July 2015, two police officers (Okan Acar and Feyyaz Yumuşak) were assassinated by unidentified men. Soon after, 9 Turkey Kurds were anonymously denounced as the killers, arrested and accused of assassinations under PKK orders. Authorship was first claimed by PKK's armed wing HPG, describing it as a retaliation following the prior 2015 Suruç bombing.
22 July 2015	Feyyaz Yumuşak	PKK (alleged by Turkey)	Ceylanpınar, Şanlıurfa, Turkey	Assassination successful	2 killed	On 22 July 2015, two police officers (Okan Acar and Feyyaz Yumuşak) were assassinated by unidentified men. Soon after, 9 Turkey Kurds were anonymously denounced as the killers, arrested and accused of assassinations under PKK orders. Authorship was first claimed by PKK's armed wing HPG, describing it as a retaliation following the prior 2015 Suruç bombing.
3 October 2015	Haci Lokman Birlik	Turkey	Şırnak, Turkey	Assassination successful	1 killed	Lokman was killed and his corpse tied with a rope to a police car and filmed by the police while being pulled through the streets of Şırnak. Lokman was the brother-in-law of HDP deputy Leyla Birlik.
28 December 2015	Tahir Elçi	Turkey (assumed)	Diyarbakır, Turkey	Assassination successful	1 killed	President of the Diyarbakır Bar Association, who litigated against Turkey at the European Court of Human Rights.
14 September 2016	Ahmet Budak	PKK	Şemdinli, Hakkari, Turkey	Assassination successful	1 killed	Ahmet Budak was a politician for AK Party. He was killed in front of his son with a pistol when 3 PKK members including a child attacked him.
22 September 2016	Halit Benek	PKK	Mazıdağı, Mardin, Turkey	Assassination failed	None (+1 perpetrator killed)	Halit Benek was governor of Mazıdağı District for AK Party. A PKK member tried to assassinate him on 22 September with a pistol and a grenade but the assassin was shot death by police.
10 October 2016	Aydın Muştu	PKK	Özalp, Van, Turkey	Assassination successful	1 killed	Aydın Muştu was vice governor of Özalp District for AK Party. He was killed by PKK members in front of his house on 10 October.
11 October 2016	Deryan Aktert	PKK	Dicle, Diyarbakır, Turkey	Assassination successful	1 killed	Deryan Aktert was vice governor of Dicle District for AK Party. He was killed by PKK members on 11 October.
9 November 2016	Ali Boutan	Turkey	Qamishli, Rojava, Syria	Assassination successful	1 killed	Commander of Anti-Terror Units.
10 November 2016	Muhammed Fatih Safitürk	PKK	Derik, Mardin, Turkey	Assassination successful	1 killed, 1 wounded	Muhammed Fatih Safitürk was governor of Derik District. He was assassinated by PKK via a bomb in his office. He was critically wounded and died of wounds the day after the attack. His personal chauffeur was also injured but survived.
17 December 2016	Turan Bedirhanoğlu	PKK	Şırnak, Turkey	Assassination failed	1 wounded (+1 perpetrator wounded)	Turan Bedirhanoğlu vice governor of Şırnak for AK Party. The Turkish Intelligence was aware of a planned assassination before the planned date and took measures. Bedirhanoğlu was protected by special forces on 17 December. PKK militias opened fire when they realized they were noticed. Dincer was slightly and one of the PKK militias was heavily wounded.
15 August 2018	İsmail Özden	Turkey	Snune, Sinjar, Iraqi Kurdistan	Assassination successful	1 killed	Insurgent's leadership. Assassinated in a Turkish airstrike on Sinjar.
17 July 2019	Osman Köse	PKK (alleged by Turkey)	Erbil, Iraqi Kurdistan	Assassination successful	3 killed	Köse was an officer in Turkish consulate in Iraq. He was assassinated when he was dining on a restaurant in Erbil. Two Iraqi civilians were also killed in the assassination. Turkish government blamed PKK however, People's Defence Forces (HPG), the armed wing of the PKK never claimed responsibility for the assassination.
12 October 2019	Hevrin Khalaf	Ahrar al-Sharqiya	M4 Motorway, Rojava, Syria	Assassination successful	1 killed	Hevrin Khalaf was a Kurdish-Syrian politician who served as the Secretary-General of the Future Syria Party. She was executed by Turkish-backed Ahrar al-Sharqiya militants.
23 June 2020	Zehra Berkel	Turkey	Helincê, Kobane, Syria	Assassination successful	3 killed	Berkel was a women's rights activist in Syrian's Rojava region as a coordinating member of the Kongra Star women's movement. She was killed via a Turkish drone attack together Amina Waysi and Mizgin Xelil. Turkey has been criticized for this killing of women's rights activists.
5 June 2021	Selman Bozkir (aka Docteur Huseyin)	Turkey	Makhmour refugee camp, Iraq	Assassination successful	3 killed	Turkey claimed the airstrike which killed Bozkir and two others, claiming Bozkir, the camp manager, to be a senior PKK official and the camp to be "an incubator for terrorism". The Makhmour camp was created in the 1990s, hosting refugees fleeing South-Eastern Turkey's destruction.
16-17 August 2021	Seîd Hesen	Turkey	Sinjar, Iraqi Kurdistan Sikeniye village, Sinjar District	Assassination successful	11 killed	Seîd Hessen was an Iraqi Sinjar YBŞ commander targeted by Turkey airstrikes, including airstrikes on his hospital. Two assistants, 4 YBŞ security, and 4 medical staffs were killed.
7 December 2021	Marwan Badal Haji	Turkey	Khanasor, Shingal district	Assassination successful	2 killed	Marwan Badal Haji was an Iraqi, Yazidi, Sinjar YBS commander. In 2014 while ISIS invaded Sinjar, Badal formed the core of a Yazidi resistance militia which later became the YBS, supported by Syrian YPG. Turkey considers YPG and YBS as foreign offshoots of Turkish PKK.

== See also ==
- List of arrested mayors in Turkey – mostly Kurdish parties representatives
