= 2013 triple murder of Kurdish activists in Paris =

2013 murders in Paris, France

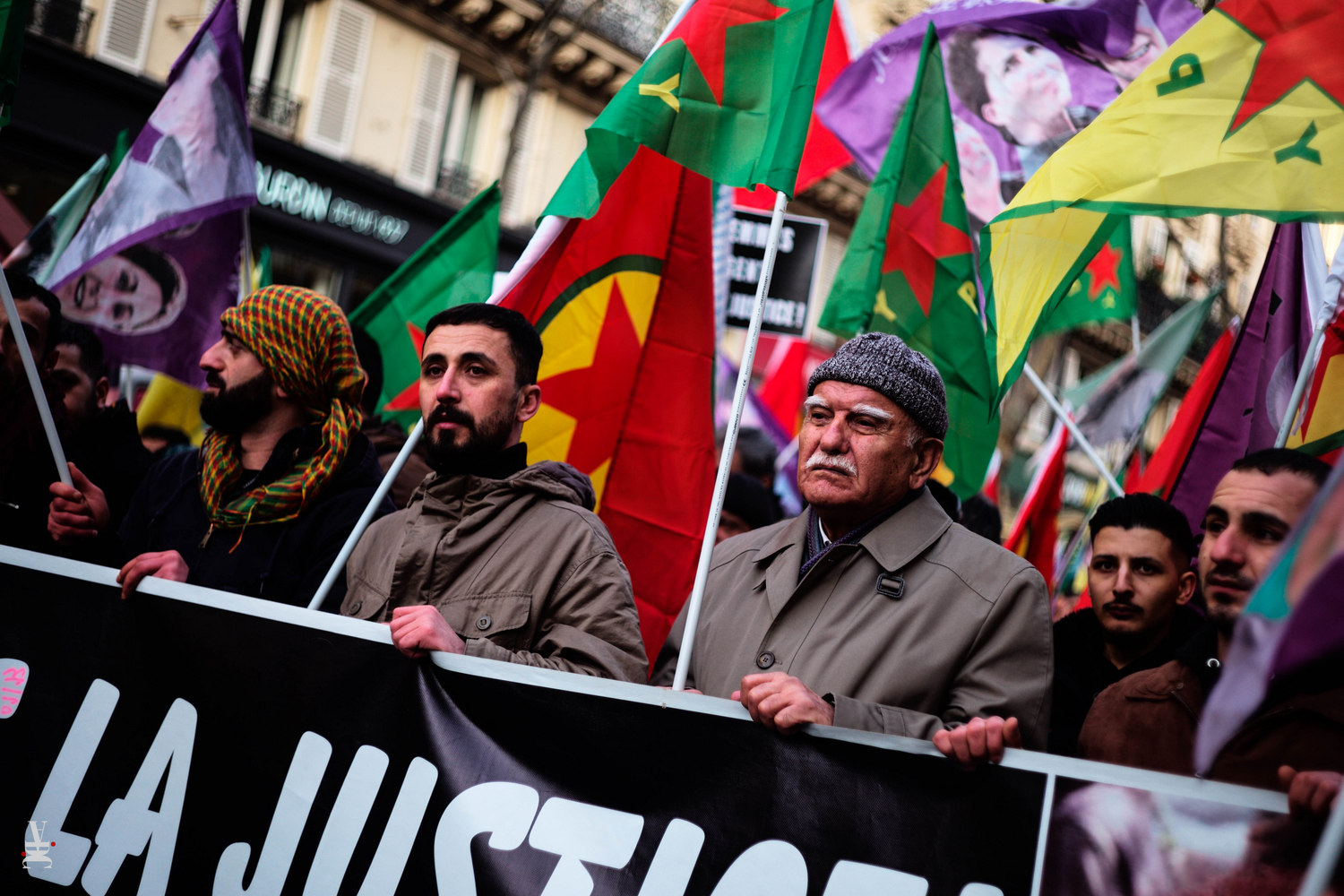
Demonstration in Paris on 11 January 2019.

On the night of 9 January 2013, Kurdistan Workers' Party (PKK) members Sakine Cansız and Leyla Şaylemez, along with Kurdish representative Fidan Doğan, were fatally shot in the 10th arrondissement of Paris. Despite a suspect being arrested, and the investigation into the shootings being reopened in 2019, the crime officially remains unsolved. The killings have sparked numerous protests among the Kurdish population in France,

== Assassinations ==
During the night between 9 January and 10 January 2013, the bodies of Fidan Doğan (28), Sakine Cansız (54) and Leyla Şaylemez (24) were found in the premises of the Centre d'Information sur le Kurdistan located on 147 Rue La Fayette in Paris. Each of them were shot execution-style with several bullets in the head and neck.

=== Victims ===
Sakine Cansız was a co-founder of the PKK, and Leyla Şaylemez was a member of the organization. Fidan Doğan was a member of the Kurdistan National Congress and was active at the Kurdistan Information Center in Paris, which the French broadcaster France Info has described as a liaison office for the PKK.

=== Suspect ===
Ömer Güney was soon identified as the person who was in the building during the murders as he was on the on recordings of the surveillance camera. He was described as a supporter of the far-right Nationalist Movement Party (MHP) by his contacts in Munich.

== Investigations ==
According to investigations by French authorities, it is possible that Turkey's National Intelligence Organization (MİT) is involved in the murders. The suspected murderer, Ömer Güney, was a 34 year old Turkish maintenance employee at Paris Charles de Gaulle airport. Video cameras at the site of the murder show that he was inside the building between 00:11 and 00:56 when the deaths occurred. Gunpowder was found on his bag. Technical investigations were performed on his Nokia mobile phone and experts decrypted it and restored deleted files. They found images taken the day before on 8 January establishing that he was in the premises of a Kurdish association in Villers-le-Bel between 4:23 and 5:33 in the morning and took pictures of 329 memberships files. Two days before, he took pictures of accounting tracing alleged racketeering activity inside the Kurdish community. While Güney initially presented himself to authorities as "Kurdish at heart" and sympathetic to the PKK, his relatives described him as a Turkish ultranationalist who defined himself as a "grey wolf", a Turkish far-right political group opposed to Kurdish political movements.

A few months after these murders, an audio recording between Ömer Güney and suspected MİT agents was released on the Internet. Omer Güney also had hundreds of pictures of Kurdish activists in his mobile phone. Anti-terrorist judge Jeanne Duyé was in charge of investigations; in September 2013, her computer was stolen from her home in a burglary. Ömer Güney was detained on the 21 January 2013. The French anti-terrorism unit Sous-direction anti-terroriste[fr] found a passport with three stamps from journeys to Turkey behind the radio in a car he borrowed the day of the murder.

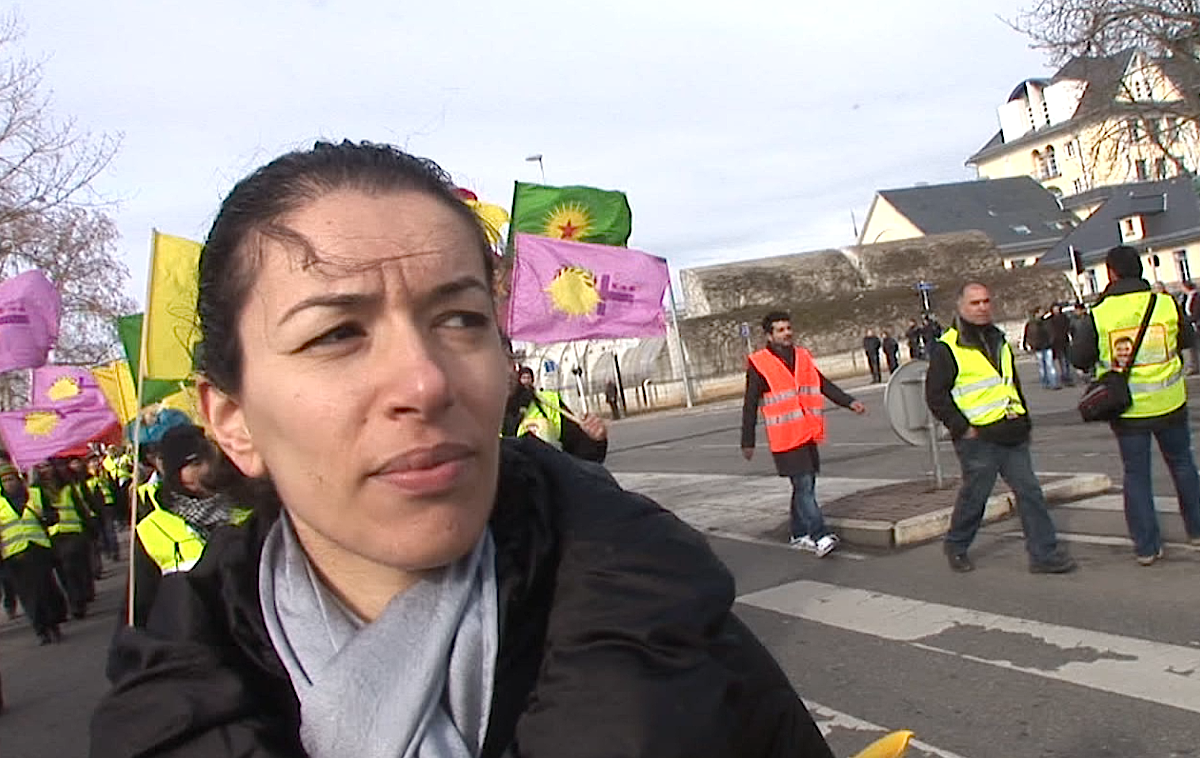
Fidan Doğan in Strasbourg in 2012

The prosecution stated Güney had frequent contacts with Turkish secret services and was proven to be involved in espionage. The judge considered the involvement of Turkish secret services in the murder to be a possibility, but didn't establish who ordered the operation and if the murderer acted according to the will of the top management or not. On 13 December 2016, Ömer Güney was moved to a hospital for urgent care connected to his brain tumor and he died the next day, five weeks before the scheduled start of his trial.

Shortly after Güney died, France decided to close the investigation into the murders. In May 2019 the investigation was reopened.

Eyyüp Doru, a representative of the Peoples' Democratic Party (HDP) speculated that the primary target of the triple assassination might have been Fidan Doğan because of her social and political connections in France. Lawyer Sylvie Boitel explained that this young woman was very clever and had three cultures: French, Turkish and Kurdish. One of brothers said that she met French President François Hollande several times when he was leader of the Socialist Party. Hollande admitted to have had contact to one of the three women often which was condemned by the Turkish president Recep Tayyip Erdoğan. Erdoğan rejected the claims from Kurdish activists that Turkey was involved in the murders, and suggested that it may have been a rift within the PKK, who wanted to obstruct the peace process.

Metin, the brother of Sakine Cansız, claimed that France was responsible because she was killed in France and the murderer died in jail before trial, going on to point out that since the slaying neither the President nor Prime Minister of France has contacted the families of the victims.

== Aftermath ==
On 17 January 2013, a public memorial ceremony for the three women was held in Diyarbakır, Turkey.

=== Funerals ===
Each woman was buried in her hometown: Cansız in Tunceli, Doğan in Kahramanmaraş, and Söylemez in Mersin.

Fidan Doğan was buried in her family's village in the Elbistan district of Kahramanmaraş, Turkey. The funeral, conducted by an Alevi dede, was attended by around 5,000 people, her coffin wrapped in the flag of the PKK whilst mourners wore white scarves to symbolise peace. The mourners included Peace and Democracy Party co-chair Gülten Kışanak, and deputies Nursel Aydoğan, Ayla Akat Ata, Hasip Kaplan as well as the mayor of Diyarbakır Osman Baydemir. Speaking at the Funeral Kışanak is quoted as saying; "We promise to all Kurdish women and these three women: We will bring peace and freedom to this land."

=== Protests ===
On the third anniversary of the assassinations thousands in Paris attended to protest among other reasons for justice. Carrying the flag of the PKK and portraits of Abdullah Öcalan the marched lead to the scene of the killing, where flowers were laid in memory of the victims. Sakine Cansız's brother Haydar who travelled from Germany for the march told the press: "Sakine's fight goes on. We will continue to march until we have obtained justice."

== See also ==
- List of assassinations of the Kurdish Workers' Party insurgency
