= Conference on Kurdish Unity and Cooperation in Western Kurdistan =

Pan-Kurdish political conference in Syria (2025)

- Nickname: Kurdish Unity Conference
- Genre: Pan-Kurdish Unity Conference
- Date: 26 April 2025
- Venue: Qamishli Hall in Azadi Park
- Location: Qamishli
- Country: AANES, Syria
- Attendance: 400
- Major events: Forging a unified Kurdish stance on governance in Syria after the Fall of the Assad Regime; Strengthening Kurdish unity
- Organiser: AANES
- People: Mazloum Abdi, Îlham Ehmed, Hamid Darbandi, Fawza Yusuf, ENKS head Muhammad Ismail, U.S. envoy Scott Bolz, Sheikh Murshid al-Khaznawi

The Conference on Kurdish Unity and Cooperation in Western Kurdistan (Kurdish: Konferansa Yekrêzi û Yekhelwesta Kurdî li Rojavayê Kurdistanê), also called Conference on Kurdish Unity of Position and Rank in Rojava, Kurdish Unity and Solidarity Conference, or simply Kurdish Unity Conference was a major conference on 26 April 2025, bringing together various Kurdish political parties, civil society organizations, women's and youth groups, artists, cultural figures, and tribal sheikhs, with the aim of establishing a common political vision and a unified stance among Kurdish political forces in Syria regarding their role after the fall of the Assad regime and their relations with the Syrian Transitional Government.

It included representatives from nearly all parts of Kurdistan: Rojava, Bakur, Bashur, and also Kurdish figures from different Syrian cities beyond the Kurdish-majority areas like Damascus, Aleppo, and Hama. Reprensentatives from Rojhelat were not present but a speech was read on behalf of an anonymous Eastern Kurdish party.

== Background ==
=== PYD and ENKS rivalry ===
The conference was preceded by a years-long rivalry between the main Kurdish parties in Syria, the governing Democratic Union Party (PYD) and the opposition Kurdish National Council in Syria (ENKS), which held differing visions for the political governance of Kurdish regions during the Syrian Civil War. Both parties accused each other of collaboration with opposing forces, corruption, and espionage, among other charges, occasionally resulting in confrontations. Multiple mediation efforts failed to resolve the disputes. As a result, relations between the Autonomous Administration of North and East Syria (AANES) and the Kurdistan Regional Government (KRG) also became strained over the course of the conflict, as the ENKS had been founded under the auspices of the influential Kurdish leader and former KRG President Masoud Barzani.

=== Fall of the Assad regime ===
Following the fall of the Assad regime and the establishment of the Syrian Transitional Government, the PYD and ENKS renewed their relations in an effort to forge a “unified Kurdish perspective.” The ENKS met with Syrian Democratic Forces (SDF) Commander-in-Chief Mazloum Abdi, with support from officials of the International Coalition, and subsequently withdrew from the National Coalition of Syrian Revolutionary and Opposition Forces in February 2025, declaring that its priority would henceforth be the protection of Kurdish rights and autonomy in Syria, as the regime has been overthrown.

=== Mazloum Abdi–Masoud Barzani meeting ===
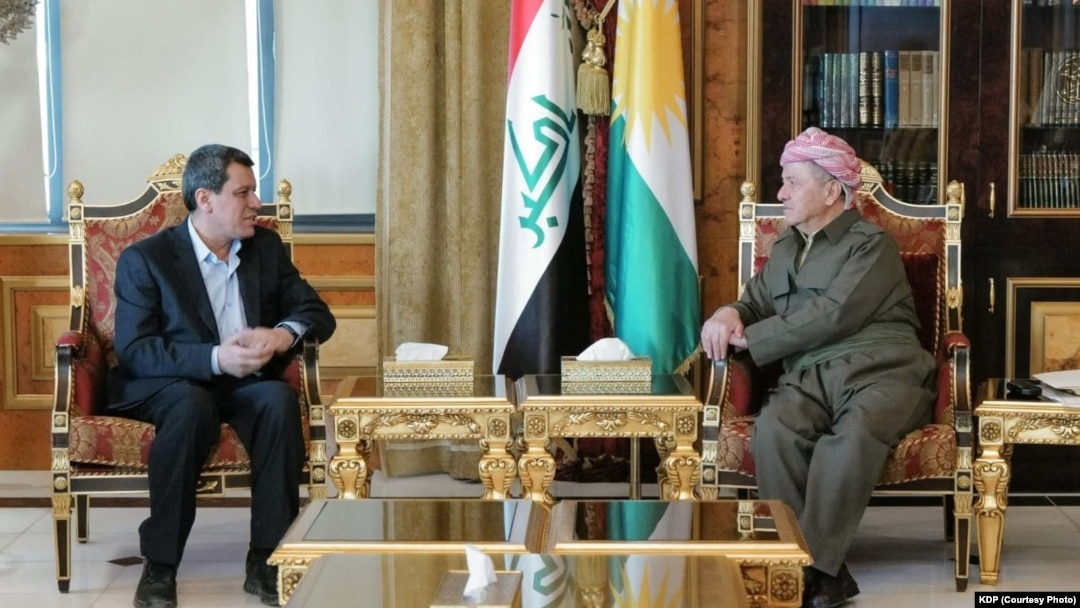
The meeting between Mazloum Abdi and Masoud Barzani, 16 January 2025

On 16 January 2025, Mazloum Abdi traveled to the Kurdistan Region to meet with KRG President Masoud Barzani to discuss the situation in Syria, recent political developments, regional security, and the importance of unity in Kurdish demands.

The meeting drew widespread attention among Kurdish communities and prompted public celebrations in several areas, as it was perceived as a new opportunity for Kurdish unity. Furthermore, the meeting was described as “historic” and “a national demand that delighted every Kurd,” according to Sinam Mohamad, the Syrian Democratic Council's (SDC) representative to the United States.

The United States welcomed the meeting, adding that "Intra-Kurdish dialogue can play a critical role in bolstering an inclusive political transition in Syria."

=== 10 March agreement ===
On 10 March, Mazloum Abdi and Syrian government leader Ahmed al-Sharaa signed the U.S.-backed March agreement, which implemented a country-wide ceasefire and laid out principles for the integration of the AANES into the new Syrian government. It envisaged equal representation for minorities in the political process and proposed integrating the SDF's military and civilian structures into the new Syrian state, while allowing the SDF to retain de facto control over border posts and oil fields in Kurdish areas.

This development prompted further discussions between Abdi and Barzani aimed at advancing a unified Kurdish stance in dealings with the new government. According to Kurdish media sources, Abdi provided Barzani with details of his recent visit to Damascus, including the agreements reached with the Syrian government, during a phone call shortly after the signing.

== Course of the event ==
The PYD and ENKS were the principal actors at the conference, each delegating 130 members. The event also included political and civic figures as guests, along with prominent delegations from the Kurdistan Region: the Kurdistan Democratic Party (KDP) delegation, led by Dr. Hamid Darbandi, envoy of Masoud Barzani, and the Patriotic Union of Kurdistan (PUK) delegation; representatives from the Peoples' Equality and Democracy Party; U.S. envoy Scott Bolz; Sheikh Murshid al-Khaznawi; and members of the Kurdistan Communities Union (KCK) and the Kurdistan National Congress (KNK). Overall, 400 participants attended the event, with more than 60 media outlets and nearly 200 journalists providing coverage.

The Ala Rengîn, the tricolor flag of TEV-DEM, the flag of the Kurdistan Communities Union, and the Syrian revolutionary flag were all raised at the event.

The event started off at 10:00 am local time with a welcoming speech and the election of the conference committee. This was followed by an opening speech by the Mazloum Abdi and further discussions and speeches by the participating guests, in addition to the reading of the letters sent to the conference. The Kurdish national anthem, Ey Reqib (Oh Enemy), was sung. There was also a moment of silence for Kurdish victims of conflicts.

After the guest speeches and discussions, the conference was closed to the media. The proposed “Draft Kurdish Unity Document,” was reviewed and the conference concluded with the issuance of a final statement presenting its outcomes to the public.

== Final declaration ==
The conference concluded with the unanimous adoption of a comprehensive document. The text included key provisions concerning both the Syrian nation-state and the Kurdish national entity. The final declaration read by Fawza Yusuf, member of the PYD Presidential Council, and Muhammad Ismail, president of the ENKS, stated the following:

=== Syrian nation-state ===
- Syria should remain a multicultural, multiethnic, and multi-religious state, guaranteeing rights for all communities, including Arabs, Kurds, Syriacs, Assyrians, Circassians, Turkmen, Alevis, Druze, Yazidis, and Christians, through constitutional and overarching legal protections.
- The state must uphold international treaties, human rights, and the principle of equal citizenship.
- Syria's government should adopt a bicameral parliamentary system, promote political pluralism, allow peaceful transfers of power, separate powers, and implement regional councils within a decentralized framework.
- Decentralization should ensure fair distribution of authority and resources between central and regional governments.
- National symbols—including the name, flag, and anthem—should reflect Syria's cultural and ethnic diversity.
- The state should guarantee religious neutrality, the right to practice faiths freely, and officially recognize the Yazidi religion.
- A comprehensive national identity should reflect the characteristics of Syria's diverse communities. Gender equality and representation should be ensured across all institutions.
- Children's rights, as defined by international agreements, should be protected, with care adapted to their needs and regional circumstances.
- Administrative divisions should be reviewed to account for population distribution and geography.
- Looted or displaced historical artifacts and monuments should be returned.
- Forced demographic changes must be prevented, and displaced residents, including those from Serêkaniyê, Girê Spî, and Efrîn, should be allowed to return safely.
- A representative constituent assembly should be established under international supervision to formulate democratic principles and create an inclusive government.
- All communities should have the right to use their mother tongue, receive education in it, and promote their culture.
- March 8 should be recognized as Women's Day.

=== Kurdish national entity ===
- Kurdish regions should be unified within a federal Syrian system as a coherent political and administrative unit.
- The Kurdish people should be recognized as an indigenous national group in Syria, with full political, cultural, and administrative rights guaranteed constitutionally and in line with international agreements.
- The sacrifices of Kurdish fighters, revolutionaries, SDF personnel, and victims of ISIS should be honored, with their families supported and their rights protected under the law.
- Youth should be treated as active contributors to society, with fair representation in state institutions. Kurdish should be recognized as an official language alongside Arabic, with access to education in Kurdish.
- Cultural and educational institutions promoting Kurdish language, history, and heritage should be established, including media outlets and research centers.
- Kurds should have meaningful participation in legislative, judicial, executive, and security institutions.
- March 21 should be recognized as Newroz, and March 12 as the commemoration of the Qamishlo Uprising.
- Past discriminatory policies against Kurds, including Arabization programs, should be annulled, and restitution provided to affected communities.The state prior to the implementation of these policies should be restored.
- Syrian citizenship should be restored to Kurds who lost it under the 1962 census.
- A portion of state revenues should be allocated to development and reconstruction in Kurdish regions to address historical neglect.

== Aftermath ==
The conference was regarded as another historic step toward further revitalizing relations between the PYD and ENKS and as a broader contribution to Kurdish unity across Kurdistan. The conference concluded with unified Kurdish demands for constitutional rights and a "landmark" decision to establish a joint Kurdish delegation tasked with initiating negotiations with the Damascus government.

The U.S. State Department welcomed the convening of the conference with a U.S. official telling local media: "The United States welcomes the resumption of Kurdish-Kurdish dialogue," expressing his country's hope for progress towards Kurdish unity.

The Washington Kurdish Institute described the conference as “more than a political event. It was a symbolic response to over a century of imposed division and repression. While Kurds have long held diverse ideological positions—from nationalism to leftism—they remain united in the belief that securing Kurdish rights, whether through independence, federalism, or autonomy, is essential.”

Citizens of the AANES gathered in public squares and streets, carrying various Kurdish flags to express their support for the outcomes of the conference. During the gatherings, slogans highlighted the importance of Kurdish solidarity and called for continued dialogue among the various Kurdish parties. In the city of Derik (Al-Malikiyah), cultural events were organized, including folkloric performances and national songs, drawing a large public turnout.
