= Kurdish-Kurdish dialogue =

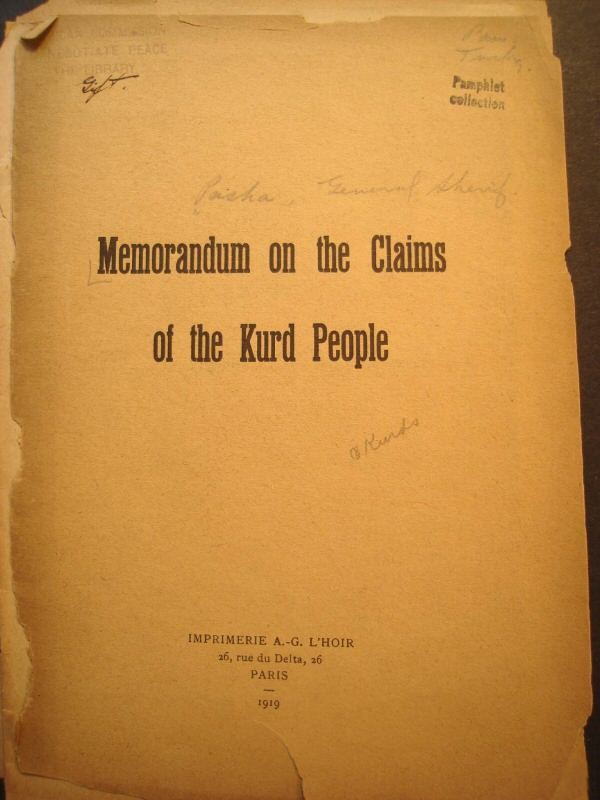
“Memorandum on the Claims of the Kurd People," a letter from Şerif Pasha, the head of the Kurdish representative in the Treaty of Sèvres (10 August 1920). The letter was written for the Allied Powers and the Conference Committee and is significant because it deals with the demands of the Kurds in the Middle East after the fall of the Ottoman Empire.

The Kurdish-Kurdish dialogue describes efforts to strengthen relations and cooperation between the various Kurdish parties. Kurds live in many countries in the Middle East, including Turkey, Iraq, Syria and Iran, and have common goals such as cultural rights, political autonomy and the improvement of their living conditions. For these reasons, many Kurdish figures have always engaged in Kurdish diplomacy. However, historical conflicts, ideological differences and influences from outside powers have often led to tensions and divisions within Kurdish society. The Kurdish-Kurdish dialogue aims to overcome these obstacles and create a common basis for political and social development.

== Background and objectives ==
=== Historical context ===
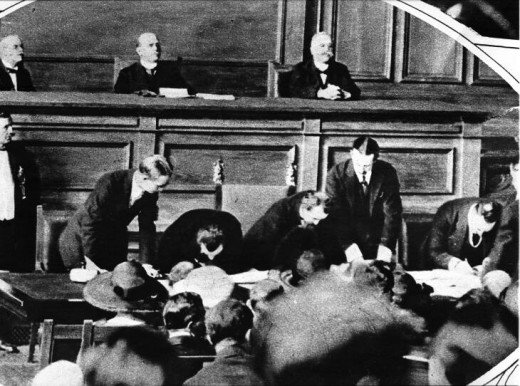
The Treaty of Lausanne (1923) was intended to replace the Treaty of Sèvres and led to the Kurds being deprived of their status.

The Kurdish-Kurdish dialogue has played an important role in Kurdish history at least since the Treaty of Sèvres, which was signed in 1920 after the First World War and first expressed the hope for Kurdish autonomy. However, this hope was dashed by the Treaty of Lausanne in 1923, which established the borders of modern-day Türkiye and largely ignored the Kurds. This led to the persecution and assimilation of the Kurds throughout the Middle East by systematically suppressing their Kurdish identity, language and culture. Many Kurdish uprisings were subsequently crushed, and there were mass deportations and political and cultural discrimination in Kurdistan, the historical settlement area of the Kurds. Until the end of the 20th century, the various Kurdish groups acted independently of one another and had little opportunity for dialogue, exchange or cooperation.

In this context, Kurdish-Kurdish dialogue between the Kurdish communities of the Middle East and the diaspora became an important strategy for developing unity and resistance. However, the Kurds were often divided due to internal conflicts and different political tendencies, which weakened their common aspirations. Nevertheless, efforts have been made several times to develop a common vision for the Kurdish future through dialogue and diplomatic cooperation. Such dialogues remain important today for improving the cultural and political situation of the Kurdish people and provide opportunities for political, cultural and social recognition.

=== Objectives ===
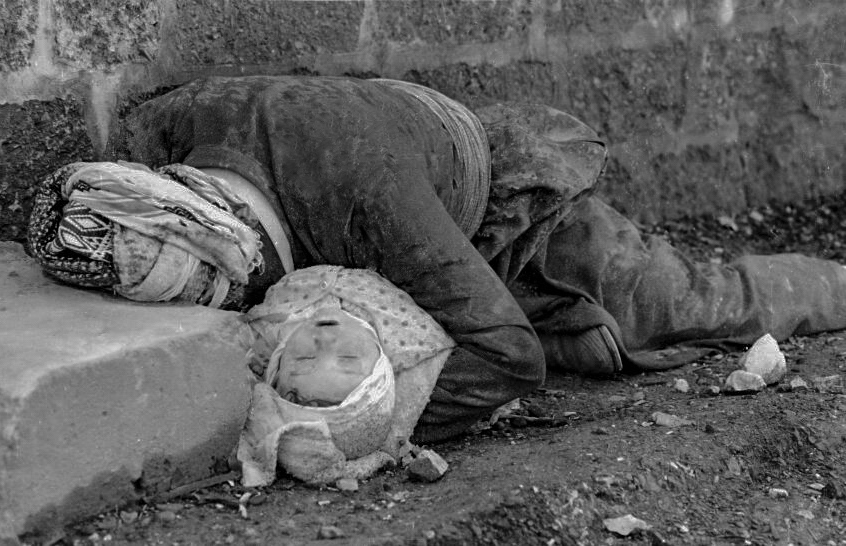
The image of Omer Khawar and his child, which became the symbol of the Halabja massacre and a symbol of the fate of the Kurdish people (1988).

Kurdish-Kurdish dialogue is a necessary prerequisite for strengthening the Kurdish cause in a divided and troubled political region such as the Middle East. Despite shared identities and goals, ideological differences, historical rivalries and influences from outside powers have often prevented Kurdish unity. In every country where Kurds live, there are specific challenges that affect dialogue, such as the PKK's armed war in Turkey, the political power-sharing in Iraq, the autonomy aspirations in Syria or the political and cultural oppression in Iran.

The cooperation of different Kurdish groups could not only strengthen their negotiating position with the respective states, but also promote international support. But without unity, the Kurds run the risk of weakening their position through internal conflicts. At the same time, dialogue is not only a political but also a social task, because it should create the basis for trust and cooperation within Kurdish societies.

Some progress has been visible since the end of the 20th century, but tensions between rival groups and the influence of external actors continue to hamper the lasting success of these dialogues. Achieving sustainable development requires a long-term commitment and a shared vision that must go beyond short-term power struggles. Therefore, Kurdish-Kurdish dialogue is not only a political challenge, but also an existential question about the future of Kurdish identity.

== Kurdish-Kurdish dialogue by region ==
There are different challenges in the four countries where Kurds live, and efforts are being made to build bridges between the different groups and across national borders. Dialogue is important to secure the rights and political future of Kurds in their divided and troubled homeland.

=== Turkey ===
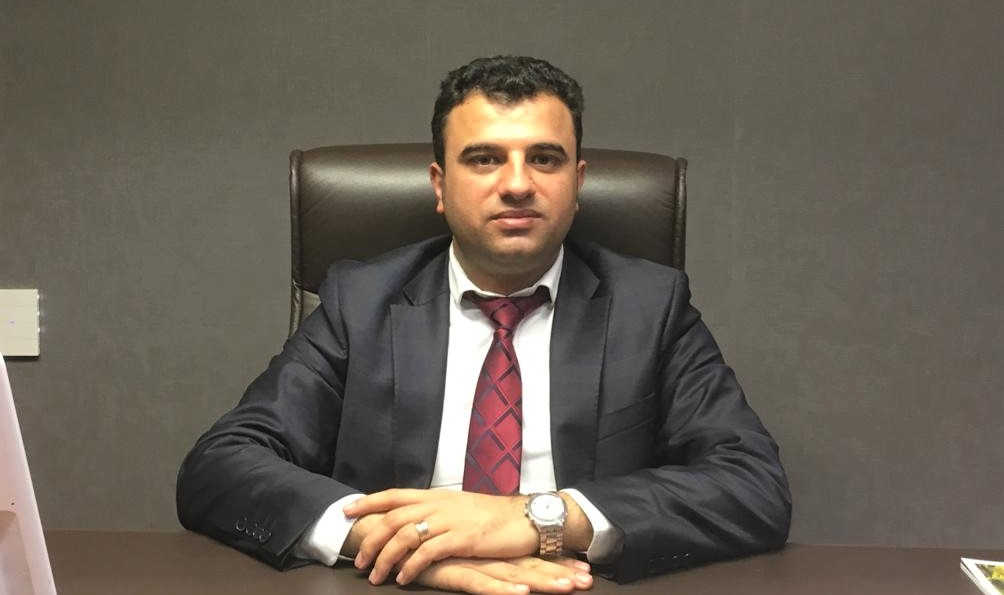
Ömer Öcalan, nephew of Abdullah Öcalan and Kurdish member of the DEM party in the Turkish parliament: His party represents, among other things, the interests of the Kurds in Turkey and would like to take on a mediating role between the PKK and the Turkish state.

In Turkey, the armed war of the Kurdistan Workers' Party (PKK) dominates Kurdish aspirations, while other groups such as the DEM Party pursue a parliamentary strategy. Since the political representation of the Kurds in the Turkish parliament, the influence of political parties such as the DEM Party has increased: The DEM Party not only promotes trust between the Kurds and the Turkish state, but also tries to unite the various political, pro-Kurdish currents under one party. In doing so, however, it faces political and legal pressure. Both movements, the PKK and the DEM Party, enjoy great popularity among Kurds and demand Kurdish rights in different ways. Even though the DEM Party is a legal Kurdish party in the Turkish parliament, it is threatened - like its predecessors - with a political ban because it insists on dialogue with all Kurdish movements instead of declaring them terrorist movements. DEM politicians repeatedly call for the release of Abdullah Öcalan or express their willingness to take on a mediating role in a possible peace process between the Turkish state and the PKK.

The Kurdish-Kurdish dialogue is also important at the regional level in Turkey. Many small groups and activists are trying to build bridges between different parts of Kurdish society. There are social and cultural projects, educational initiatives and efforts to preserve and develop the Kurdish language and culture. However, the increasing restrictions imposed by the state and the mistrust between the groups make cooperation within the Kurdish groups difficult.

=== Iraq ===
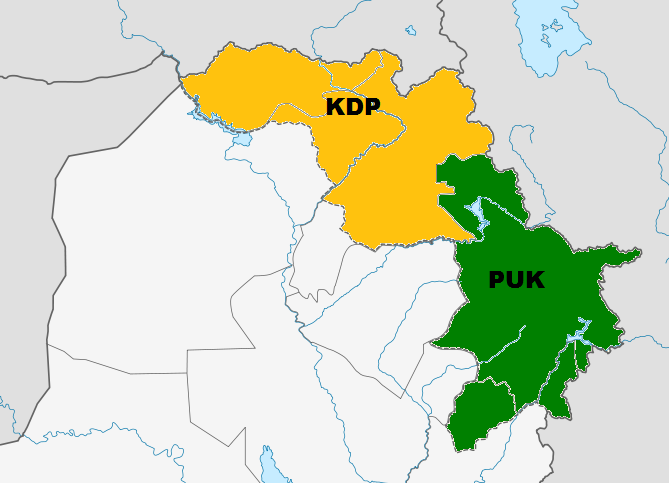
After the armed conflict between the KDP and the PUK, known as the "Kurdish civil war", the Kurdistan Autonomous Region was divided into two separate political entities. Today, both parties are trying to resolve their conflicts through dialogue.

In Iraq, the Kurdistan Autonomous Region is an integral part of the political landscape, and the Kurdish-Kurdish dialogue here is particularly characterized by the rivalry between the Kurdistan Democratic Party (KDP) and the Kurdistan National Union (PUK). The KDP, led by the Barzani family, is headquartered in Erbil and Dihok, and the PUK, led by the Talebani family, is dominant in Sulaymaniyah and surrounding areas. The two sides have a long history of conflict, including a civil war in the 1990s that left thousands dead. Although they now jointly govern the Kurdistan Autonomous Region, relations often remain tense.

Another aspect of the Kurdish-Kurdish dialogue in Iraq concerns the distribution of power in the Kurdish government and the handling of resources such as oil. While the KDP prefers more centralized control, the PUK advocates a decentralized administration. There are also differences between the two sides regarding their relationship with the Iraqi central government in Baghdad, with the PUK often being more cooperative, while the KDP takes a more confrontational stance. International actors such as the US and Iran also play a role and influence the dynamics between the Kurdish parties. In addition, the presence of armed PKK groups in the Qandil Mountains has led to various conflicts and disputes and also has a major impact on political, economic and military relations with neighboring countries such as Turkey and Iran.

=== Syria ===
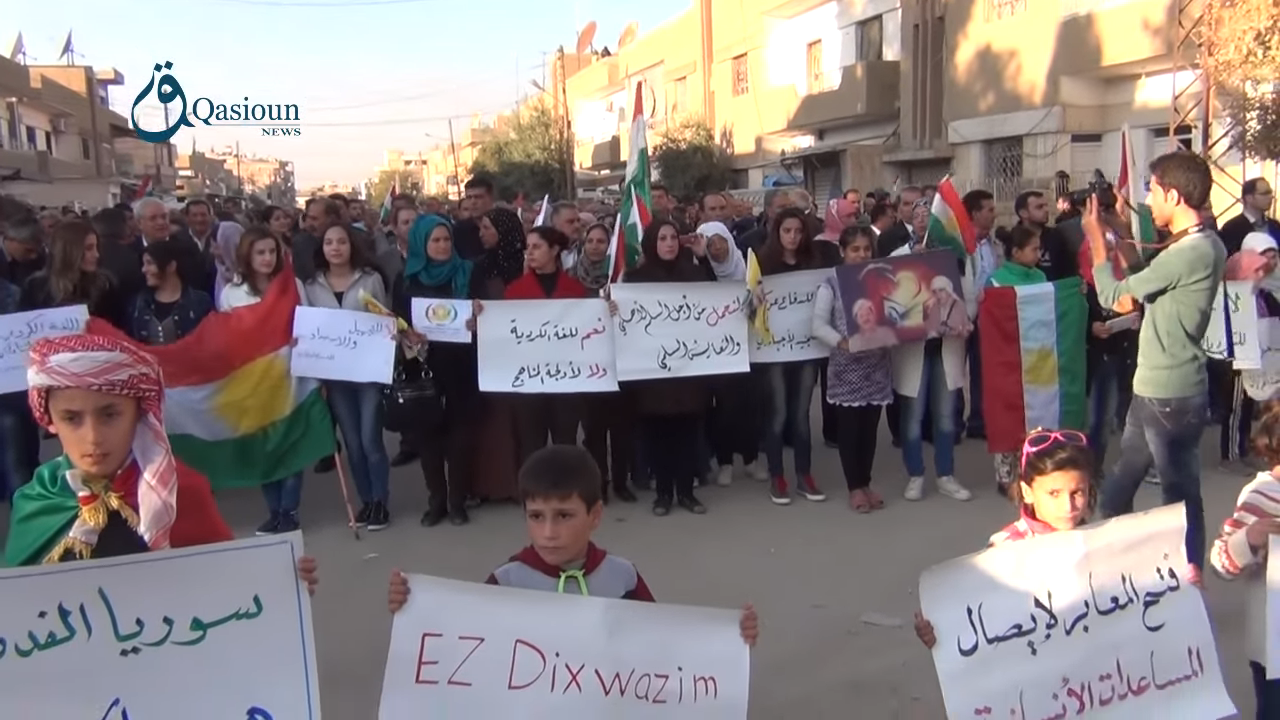
A demonstration of ENKS supporters in Qamishli, 2015

In Syria, the civil war is shaping the Kurdish question, and the Kurdish-Kurdish dialogue here is mainly focused on the relationship between the Democratic Union Party (PYD) and the Kurdish National Council (ENKS). The PYD is an important part of the HSD, which dominates the autonomous administration in the Kurdish areas of northern and eastern Syria and pursues autonomy within a federal system. On the other side is the ENKS party, which is supported by the Iraqi KDP and criticizes the PYD mainly for its dominance and authoritarian approach. The PYD's monopoly of power in the region has already led to some ideological conflicts with other Kurdish movements and parties. This led to tensions between the PYD and parties such as ENKS and as a result PYD opponents were either arrested or silenced. Due to tensions between PYD and ENKS, Kurdish-Kurdish dialogue in Syria remains difficult. International mediators, especially the United States, have tried several times to reach an agreement between the two camps in order to create a united Kurdish front in Syria.

==== Fall of the Assad regime ====
Important Kurdish personalities are also increasingly calling for dialogue between the conflicting parties, such as Sheikh Murshid Khaznavi, who has been committed to Kurdish-Kurdish dialogue since the fall of the Assad regime and has taken on the role of mediator.

A major step towards reconciliation between the PYD and ENKS, and revitalization of broader Kurdish unity, was reached during the Conference on Kurdish Unity and Cooperation in Western Kurdistan, which Kurdish political parties from all over Kurdistan took part in, including the Kurdistan Democratic Party (KDP), the Patriotic Union of Kurdistan (PUK), representatives from the Peoples' Equality and Democracy Party, members of the Kurdistan Communities Union (KCK), and the Kurdistan National Congress (KNK). The conference resulted in the unanonimous adoption of a comprehensive declaration, which included key provisions concerning both the Syrian nation-state and the Kurdish national entity, and led to a "landmark" decision to establish a joint Kurdish delegation tasked with initiating negotiations with the new Syrian transitional government on Kurdish autonomy and minority rights.

=== Iran ===
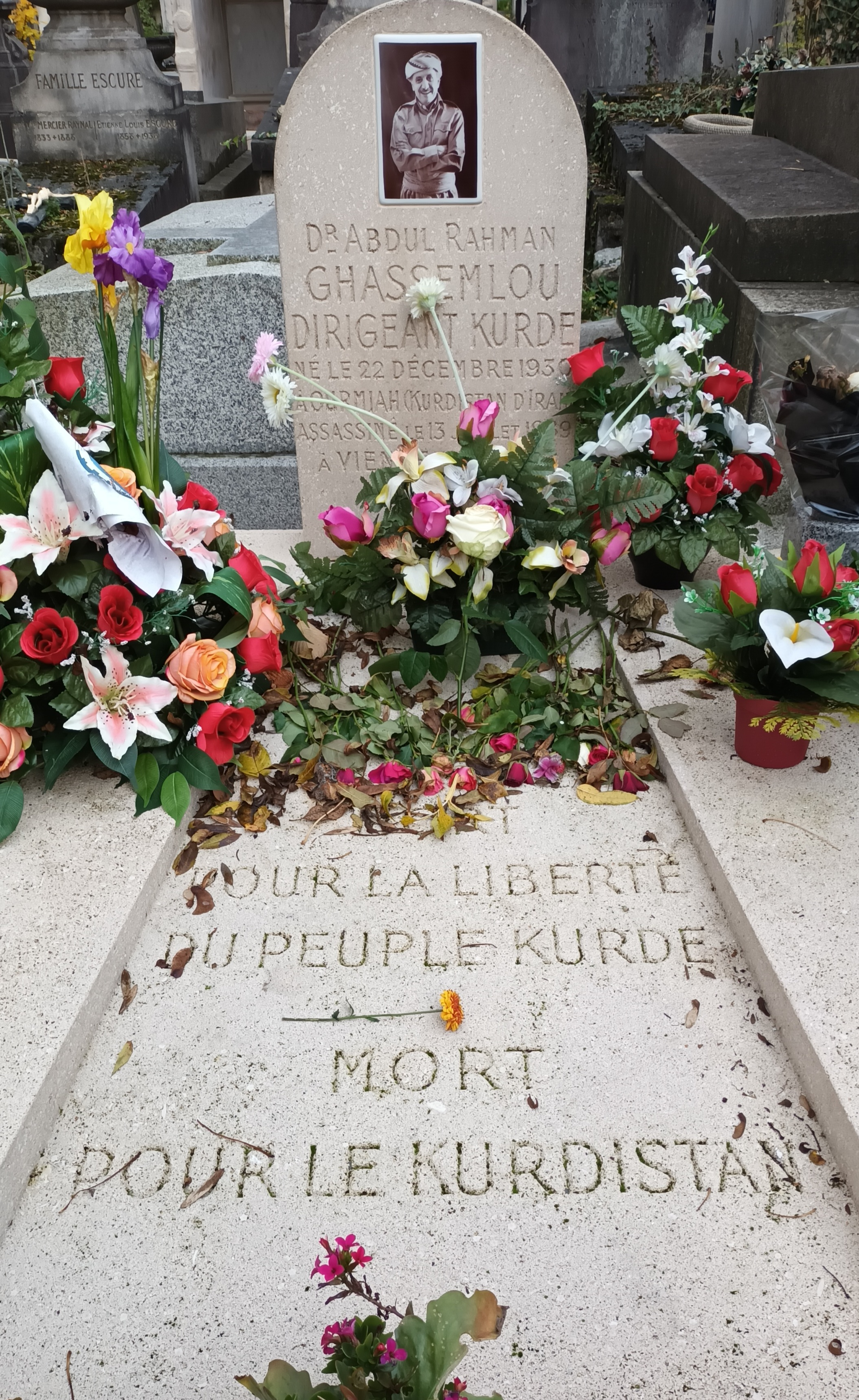
The grave of Dr. Abdulrahman Qasimlo, the leader of the PDKI, who was killed by agents of the Iranian regime in Vienna in 1989. His murder is one of the examples of how foreign forces want to influence the work of the Kurdish dialogue and diplomacy.

In Iran, Kurdish parties are under particularly great pressure, as the Iranian government rejects any form of Kurdish autonomy or self-determination. The main Kurdish groups in Iran are the Democratic Party of Iranian Kurdistan (PDKI) and the Kurdistan Free Life Party (PJAK). While the KDPI follows a more traditional nationalist approach, the PJAK is ideologically close to the PKK and relies on revolutionary change. Both parties are forced to operate in exile or underground, which limits their opportunities for cooperation.

Until 1989, Abdulrahman Qasimlo, the Secretary General of the PDKI, was a major figure in the Kurdish-Kurdish dialogue, advocating federal autonomy for the Kurds in Iran, insisting on diplomacy and non-violence. His efforts to build bridges between Kurdish groups and with the Iranian government ended tragically when he was assassinated by Iranian agents at a meeting in Vienna in 1989. His assassination demonstrated the Iranian regime's ruthlessness towards its political opponents and caused uncertainty and division within the Kurdish movement. The death of Qasimlo, who was a symbol of unity and diplomacy, left a huge gap in the Kurdish movement. His death not only exposed the Iranian regime's cruelty and oppression of the Kurds to the world, but also became a symbol of the Kurdish struggle and inspired the Kurdish people to continue their struggle.

Despite the difficult conditions, there are beginnings of a Kurdish-Kurdish dialogue in Iran, especially in the form of joint protests and international campaigns against the oppression of the Kurds. But here too, ideological differences and external influences play a role, hindering deeper cooperation. The focus is often on drawing the attention of the international community to the situation of the Kurds in Iran, since internal mobilization is hardly possible due to the harsh repression.
