= Aslı Erdoğan =

Turkish author and human rights activist (born 1967)

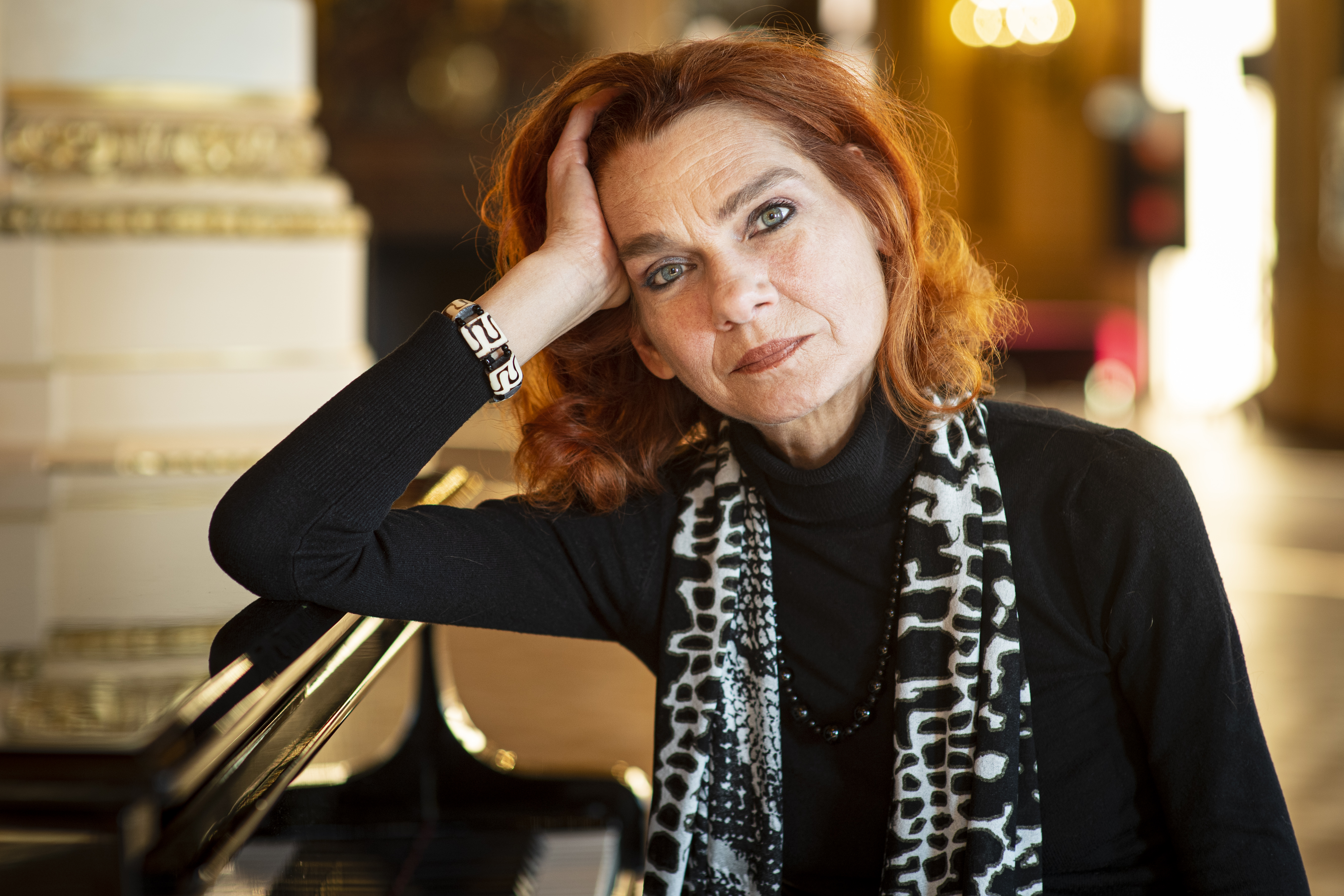
- Aslı Erdoğan (2020 by Carole Parodi)
- Born: 8 March 1967 (age 59); Istanbul, Turkey
- Education: Robert College; Boğaziçi University
- Occupations: Writer and human rights activist
- Writing career
- Notable awards: Chevalier des Arts et des Lettres (2020); Simone de Beauvoir Price (2018); Václav Havel Price (2019); Erich Maria Remarque Price (2018); Tucholsky Award (2016); D. Welle Story Awards (1997); Sait Faik Story Awards (2010)

Aslı Erdoğan (born 8 March 1967) is a prize-winning Turkish writer, author, human rights activist, and columnist for Özgür Gündem and formerly for Radikal, ex political prisoner, particle physicist. Her second novel has been published in English, and eight books translated into twenty languages.

Aslı Erdoğan is a writer of literature and author of eight books, novels, novellas, collections of poetic prose and essays, translated into twenty languages including English, French, German, and published by various publishers such as Actes Sud, Penguin Germany, The City Lights among others. She has worked as a columnist in various national and international papers, and she was arrested in 2016 for her collaboration with the pro-Kurdish newspaper Özgür Gündem. Aslı Erdoğan has received several prizes in literature, arts and human rights such as Simone de Beauvoir Prize or the Erich Maria Remarque Peace Prize. Her work has been adapted into theater and acted in Milan, Graz and Avignon, into classical ballet, radio, a short film and finally to opera. She is currently living in exile in Germany.

== Early years ==
Born in Istanbul, she graduated from Robert College in 1983 and the Computer Engineering Department of Boğaziçi University in 1988. She worked at CERN as a particle physicist from 1991 to 1993 and received an MSc in physics from Boğaziçi University as a result of her research there. She began research for a PhD in physics in Rio de Janeiro, Brazil before returning to Turkey to become a full-time writer in 1996.

== Writing career ==
Her first story, The Final Farewell Note, won third prize in the 1990 Yunus Nadi Writing Competition. Her first novel, Kabuk Adam (Crust Man), was published in 1994 and was followed in 1996 by Mucizevi Mandarin (The Miraculous Mandarin) a series of interconnected short stories. Her short story Wooden Birds received first prize from Deutsche Welle radio in a 1997 competition and her second novel, Kırmızı Pelerinli Kent (The City in Crimson Cloak), received numerous accolades abroad and has been published in English translation.

She was the Turkish representative of PEN International's Writers in Prison Committee from 1998 to 2000. She also wrote a column entitled The Others for the Turkish newspaper Radikal, the articles from which were later collected and published as the book Bir Yolculuk Ne Zaman Biter (When a Journey Ends).

She has widely traveled and has an interest in anthropology and Native American culture.

From December 2011 to May 2012, at the invitation of the Literaturhaus Zürich and the PWG Foundation, Erdoğan was Zürich's "writer in residence".

She was a writer-in-resident for the ICORN in Kraków, Poland in 2016. After her return to Turkey, she continued to write for the pro-Kurdish daily Özgür Gündem.

== Arrest ==
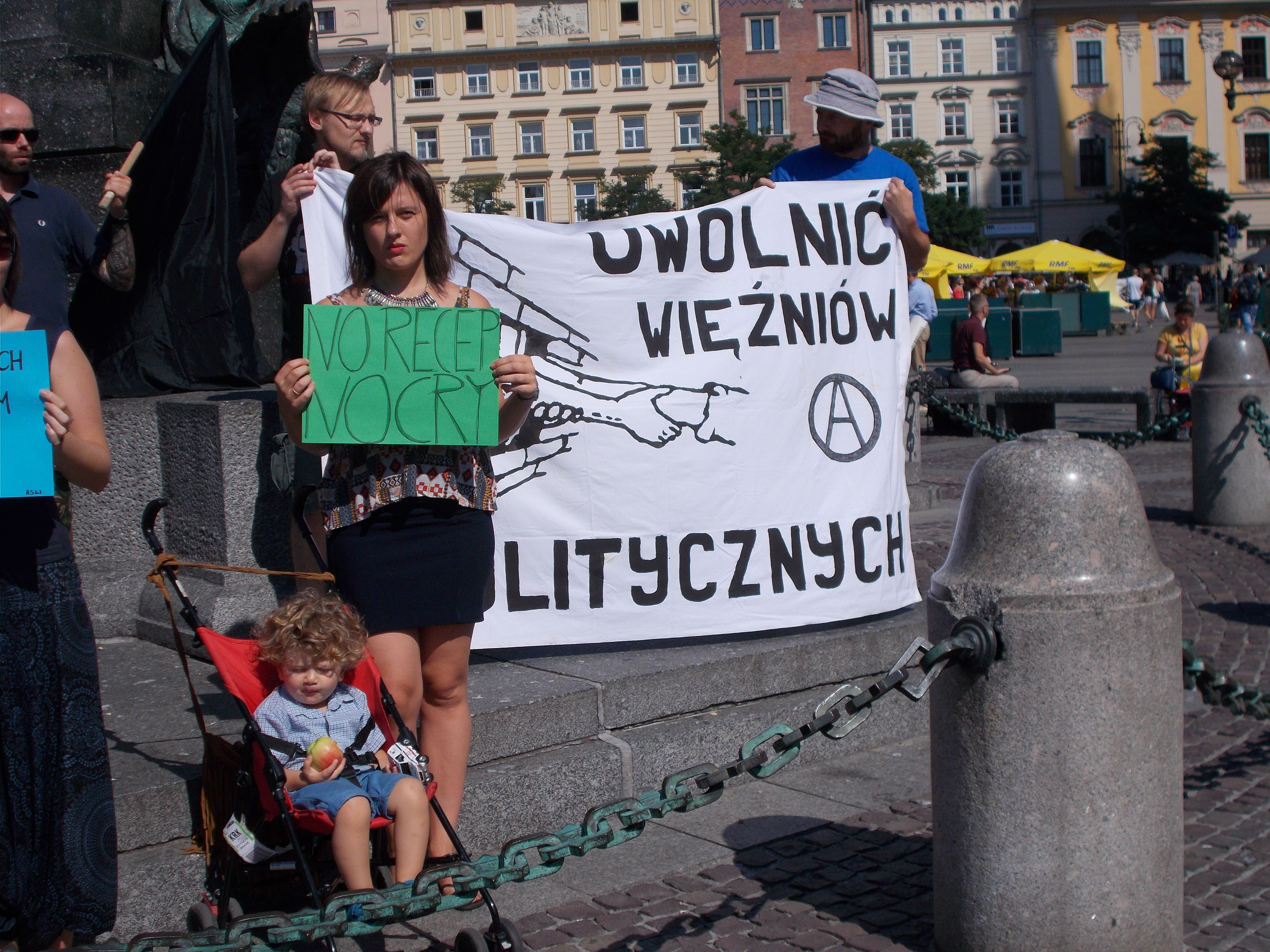
Demonstration in support of Erdoğan, Kraków, September 2016. The banner reads "Release Aslı Erdoğan and the political prisoners of the Turkish regime".

Erdoğan was arrested during the police raid on Özgür Gündem on 16 August 2016, for being a member of the advisory board of the newspaper. On 20 August, she was held in pretrial detention. Özgür Gündem was quickly succeeded by Özgürlükçü Demokrasi (Libertarian Democracy), which featured a daily column called 'Aslı’s Friends'. After four months, she was released pending trial. Following the lifting of a travel ban in June 2017, she left Turkey for Germany, where she lives in exile.

== English language bibliography ==
Two of Erdoğan's works are available in English translation.

=== The City in Crimson Cloak ===
The City in Crimson Cloak (Turkish title: Kırmızı Pelerinli Kent) is a 1998 novel, which was republished in 2007 by Soft Skull Press in English translation by Amy Spangler.

Özgür, the young Turkish protagonist of the story, having deserted her past and secluded herself from outer world, is poor, hungry, and on the verge of a mental breakdown. She has a single weapon left in the all-out war she has declared against Rio de Janeiro: to write the city, which has trapped her and robbed her of everything.

Amy Benfer, writing for Barnes & Noble, states, "The novel might have been richer had Erdoğan taken advantage of the structure to interrogate Özgür's motives and perceptions more fully than Özgür herself can. But it does succeed as a sort of reverse postcard - the hazards of the tropics seen in the eyes of a woman from winter climes."

==== Editions ====
- The City in Crimson Cloak. trans. Amy Spangler. New York: Soft Skull Press. 2007. ISBN 978-1-933368-74-0.

=== The Stone Building and Other Places ===
The Stone Building and Other Places is a collection of three short stories and a novella ("The Morning Visitor," "The Wooden Birds," "The Prison," and The Stone Building). The collection has become a best seller in Turkey.

The interconnected short stories feature women whose lives have been interrupted by forces beyond their control: exile, serious illness, and the imprisonment of loved ones. These tales culminate in the novella; the "stone building" is a metaphor for the various oppressive institutions—prisons, police HQ's, hospitals, and psychiatric asylums—that dominate the lives of the characters.

==== Editions ====
- The Stone Building and Other Places. Trans. Sevinç Türkkan. San Francisco: City Lights. 2018. ISBN 978-0-87286-750-5.

=== On-line translations ===
- Wooden Birds by Aslı Erdoğan at Boğaziçi University and Words Without Borders
- Extract from The Miraculous Mandarin by Aslı Erdoğan at Boğaziçi University
- Four articles by Aslı Erdoğan were used in the Turkish State’s indictment against her: This is your father, The diary of fascism: today, The most cruel of months, History Readings by a Madman

== Awards and honors ==
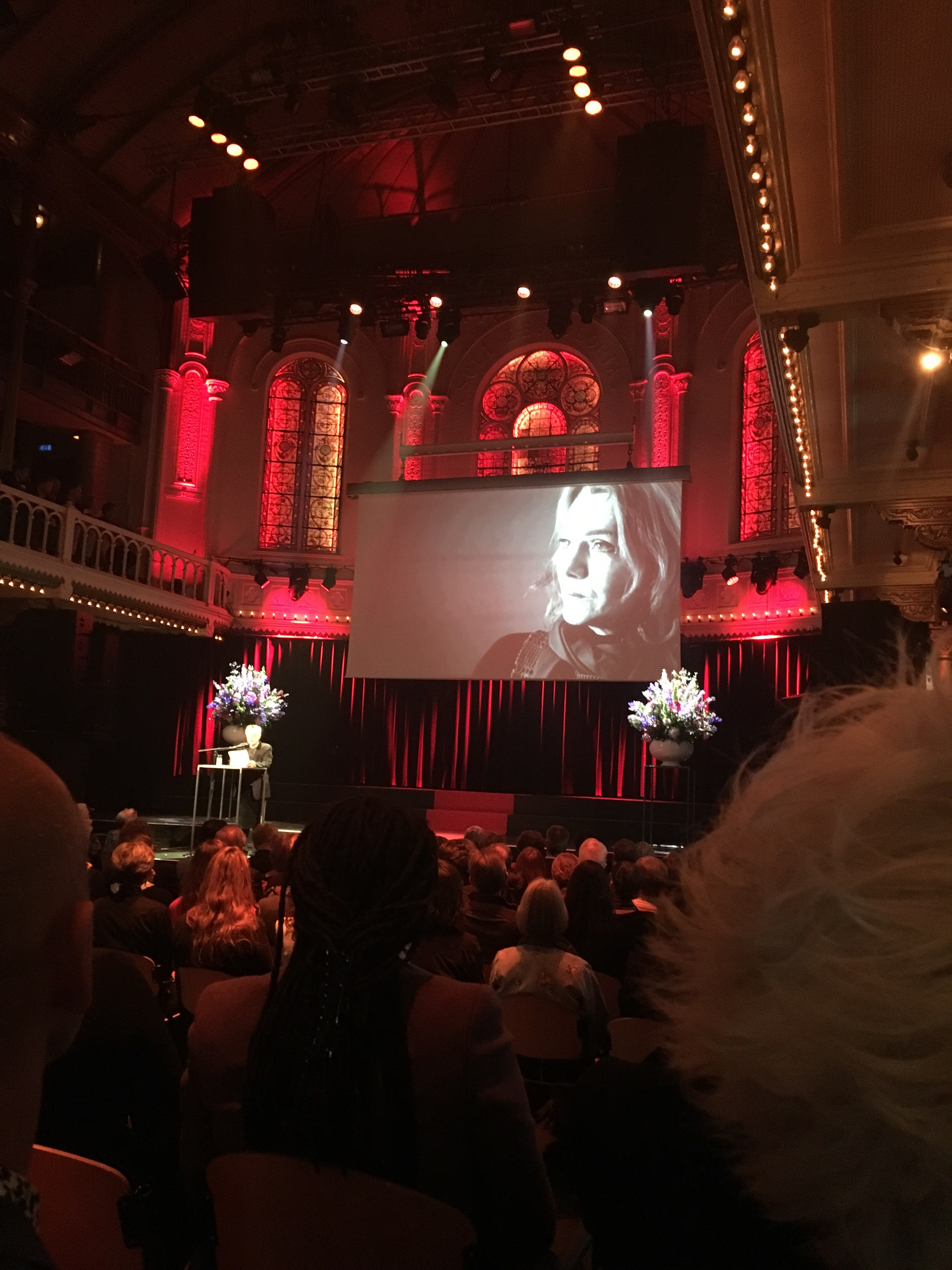
European Cultural Foundation Princes Margriet Award for Culture, Amsterdam, Netherlands - May 9th, 2017

- Yunus Nadi prize, Turkey 1990
- Deutsche Welle, Germany 1997
- Sait Faik Short Story Award, Turkey 2010
- Ord i Grensen (Words without borders) Prize, Norway 2013
- PEN Sweden - Tucholsky Prize, Sweden 2016
- European Cultural Foundation, Princes Margriet Award for Culture, Amsterdam, Netherlands, May 2017
- Prize for Freedom and Future of Media, Germany, Leipzig, 2017
- Premio Letterario Vincenzo Padula, Italy 2017
- Premio Adriatico Meditterraneo, Italy 2017
- Bruno Kreisky Prize for Human Rights, Vienna, Austria, 2017
- Theodor Heuss Medal, Germany, 2017
- Stuttgart Peace Prize, Stuttgart, 2017
- Erich Maria Remarque Peace Prize, Germany, 2017
- Simone de Beauvoir Prize for Human Rights, Paris 2018
- Medal of Chevalier des Arts et des Lettres, Paris 2018
- Vaclav Havel Library Award, USA 2019
- Norwegian Writers Association Award, Norway 2019
