= Birlik =

Birlik may refer to:

- Birlik (surname), list of people with the surname
- Birlik, Kazakhstan
- Birlik, Issyk Kul, Kyrgyzstan
- Birlik, Lice
- Unity (Uzbekistan)
- Birlik-2025 – Multinational military exercise in Uzbekistan

== See also ==
- MV Birlik 1, a ferry in service 2007-13
