= Birlik (surname) =

Birlik is a surname which is mostly used in Turkey. Notable people with the surname are as follows:

- Atilla Birlik (born 1977), German-Turkish football player
- Hacı Lokman Birlik (1988–2015), Kurdish-Turkish person murdered by the Turkish security forces
- Leyla Birlik (born 1974), Kurdish politician
