= Gültan Kışanak =

Turkish politician (born 1961)

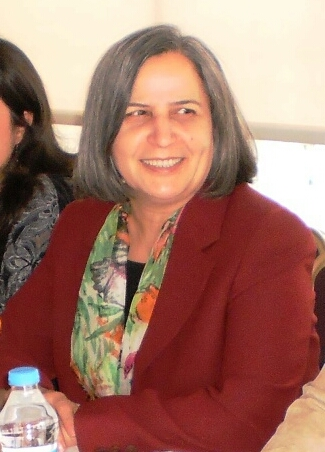

Mayor of Diyarbakır
- In office 31 March 2014 – 30 October 2016
- Preceded by: Osman Baydemir
- Succeeded by: Cumali Atilla

Co-chair of the Peace and Democracy Party
- In office 4 September 2011 – 22 April 2014 Serving with Selahattin Demirtaş
- Preceded by: Selahattin Demirtaş
- Succeeded by: Party abolished See Democratic Regions Party

Member of the Grand National Assembly
- In office 22 July 2007 – 31 March 2014
- Constituency: Diyarbakır (2007); Siirt (2011)

Personal details
- Born: 15 June 1961 (age 65) Elazığ, Turkey

Gültan Kışanak (born 15 June 1961) is a Kurdish journalist, author and politician from Turkey. Kışanak was born in Elazığ in 1961. Her family is originally from Tunceli. She is a former member of the Grand National Assembly of Turkey and Head of Municipality of Diyarbakır. She has been imprisoned since October 2016.

== Education ==
In 1978 Kışanak began studying at the Faculty of Education of Dicle University but was arrested in 1980 and imprisoned in the Diyarbakir Prison for two years. According to her own account, she was forced to stay in the prison warden's dog kennel for two months because she refused to stand up in his presence. In another speech, she said that she slept in a dog hut for six months. She began studying journalism at Ege University, İzmir, in 1986. On the March 16, 1988, she was arrested while protesting Saddam Hussein's attack on Halabja. She was released one year later. After her release, she graduated in 1990.

== Journalistic career ==
From 1990 to 1992, she wrote for the newspaper Yeni Ülke. Afterward, from 1990 to 2004, she worked as an editor-in-chief, an editorial coordinator, or a news director in a variety of newspapers. For the pro-Kurdish Özgür Gündem, she reported from Adana and after she moved to Istanbul, she served as its editor-in-chief for a while. Following the closure of Özgür Gündem in 1994, she wrote for Özgür Ülke which was shut down on February 2, 1995, on the grounds that it represented a continuation of Özgür Gündem.

== Political career ==
In 2004 she became a social policy consultant in the Baĝlar Municipality in Diyarbakir and was involved in the Kardelen Women's House in Diyarbakır. She stood successfully as an independent candidate within the Democratic Society Party (DTP) supported Thousand Hopes alliance in the 2007 parliamentary election in Turkey and became an MP for Diyarbakır. During the campaign, she was quoted as saying, "This election is important because Turkey is at a crossroads. Either it is going to opt for developing democratic alternatives or will bring the oppressive policies back on to the agenda. We are hoping for the democratic forces to come out of these elections much stronger and help to establish the options of democracy dialog and peace. We'll search for solutions not in violence, but in parliament."

At the beginning of 2009, it was reported that she had prepared a bill to enable the Kurdish language to be used in the public space. For the Parliamentary Elections in 2011 she was elected as an independent candidate from southeastern Siirt province.

In the Municipal elections in March 2014, she was elected as a first female Head of Municipality of Diyarbakır. In view of the detentions of several mayors from the Democratic Regions Party (DBP) over self-government claims, she defended them alleging self-governance is a political aim and also demanded self-governance. On October 25, 2016, she was detained together with co-mayor Fırat Anlı which led almost one hundred feminist and LGTB rights organizations to demand her release.

== Legal Prosecution and Imprisonment ==
According to her own account, Kisanak was imprisoned for 4 1/2 years before she was arrested again. Her renewed detention in October 2015 was on "charges of being a member of the Kurdistan Workers Party (PKK)". Following the two co-mayors' arrest, the Turkish government ordered a general internet blackout. Nevertheless, on October 26, several thousand demonstrators at Diyarbakir City Hall demanded the mayors' release. In November, public prosecutors demanded a 230-year prison sentence for Kışanak. In February 2019 she was sentenced to 14 years and 3 months in prison for "being a member of a terrorist organization" and for "propaganda of a terrorist organization". While in prison, she compiled essays by herself and other imprisoned Kurdish women politicians into the book The Purple Color of Kurdish Politics. She is detained in the F-Type prison in Kandira, Kocaeli. She was released on 16 May 2024.

== Personal life ==
She grew up in a household of an Alevi faith. She is married and has a daughter.

== Movies ==
She was featured in the 2008 film What a Beautiful Democracy, about the struggle of Turkish women running for parliament.

She was also interviewed for the movie Hevî by Yüksel Yavuz.

Her daughter discusses her imprisonment in the 2023 film Tearing Walls Down by Şerif Çiçek and Hebûn Polat.
