= Gerald Nagler =

Swedish businessman and human rights activist (1929–2022)

- Died: 23 July 2022

Hans Gerald Nagler (10 December 1929 – 23 July 2022) was a Swedish businessman and human rights activist.

Gerald Nagler was the son of the Austrian Jewish businessman Siegmund Nagler. The family moved from Vienna to Stockholm in 1931, where he grew up and graduated in 1948. He worked in, and later took over, the wholesale and import company for instruments and optical equipment founded by his father. In 1957 he became Managing Director of Handels AB Urania Stockholm. In addition, he was a reserve officer.

In 1977, at the invitation of Morton Narrowe, he went to the Soviet Union to make contact with Andrei Sakharov, Yelena Bonner, Naum Meiman, Alexander Lerner and other Russian dissidents (refusniks). He then founded the Swedish Helsinki Committee for Human Rights in 1982 and was its Chairman from 1992 to 2004. Nagler also co-founded the International Helsinki Federation for Human Rights in 1984 and was its first Secretary General in Vienna from 1984 to 1992.

He was Honorary President of the Civil Rights Defenders.
