= Ocak Işık Yurtçu =

Turkish journalist (1945–2012)

- Born: 1945
- Died: 8 September 2012 (aged 66–67)
- Occupation: reporter
- Organization: Özgür Gündem
- Known for: Imprisonment by Turkish government
- Awards: International Press Freedom Award (1996)

Ocak Işık Yurtçu (1945–8 September 2012) was a Turkish reporter detained for thirty-two months between 1993-1997 by the Turkish government for his reporting on the Kurdish–Turkish conflict, a case The New York Times called "emblematic" of the Turkish press's struggle for press freedom in the 1990s.

== Background ==
Yurtçu began his journalistic career in 1966 as a reporter at the Ekspres. Over the next twenty-five years, he worked at another half-dozen papers as a reporter or columnist, including Yenigun, Ulus, Politika, Dunya, Demokrat, Gunes, Cumhuriyet, and Yeni Halkci. At Yeni Halkci in 1971, Yurtçu published a series of articles on the torture of political prisoners, bringing him national recognition. In 1975, he was made an honorary member to the National Writers' Union of Turkey.

At the time of his imprisonment, Yurtçu was serving as the editor of Özgür Gündem (English: "Free Agenda"). The paper was particularly known for its extensive coverage of the ongoing conflict between the Turkish Armed Forces and the Kurdistan Workers' Party (PKK), a Kurdish guerrilla army, which was being downplayed by mainstream Turkish media. During Yurtçu's tenure as editor, the paper's circulation grew to more than 100,000, a record for an independent Turkish paper.

== 1993 arrest and imprisonment ==
In 1993, the Turkish government arrested Yurtçu, stating that the reporting of Özgür Gündem violated Articles 6, 7, and 8 of its Anti-Terror Law and Article 312 of its Penal Code. Yurtçu had not personally written the articles in question—only served as the paper's editor—and noted following his imprisonment that "Nobody in the world has been sentenced to so many years in prison for articles others have written". He was found guilty of the charges and sentenced to fifteen years' imprisonment, and after his December 1994 appeal was rejected, he began serving his sentence. The court also ordered Özgür Gündem shut down.

The New York-based Committee to Protect Journalists soon selected Yurtçu as an "emblematic case" for Turkish press freedom, at a time when Turkey had more imprisoned journalists than any other nation. Former journalist hostage Terry A. Anderson led the CPJ's campaign to free Yurtçu, hoping to win his freedom first as a "concession" and then use it as leverage to press for the freedom of other imprisoned Turkish journalists.

Reporters Without Borders also campaigned for his release, asking European journalists to adopt Yurtçu through their "godfather" system. One of these, a reporter from the French newspaper Le Figaro, was critical of the reaction of other Turkish media to Yurtçu's detention, stating that:

Turkish journalists lag behind their Western counterparts in expressing their support for Yurtcu… If it hadn't been for the [Reporters Without Borders] campaign, no one would be interested in his case."

On 14 August 1997, the Turkish parliament unanimously passed a limited amnesty for Yurtçu and several other jailed editors. Yurtçu was released from Sanjay prison the following day. Upon leaving prison, Yurtçu was given a bouquet of flowers by the prison prosecutor.

== International recognition ==
During Yurtçu's imprisonment, Amnesty International designated him a prisoner of conscience. In 1996, The Committee to Protect Journalists awarded him an International Press Freedom Award, "an annual recognition of courageous journalism". Reporters Without Borders awarded him the Reporters Without Borders/Fondation de France Prize the same year.

In 2000, Yurtçu was a finalist to be selected as Turkey's representative for the International Press Institute's 50 World Press Freedom Heroes of the past half-century. Though the committee eventually selected Milliyet editor Abdi İpekçi, committee member Raymond Louw later described the choice between İpekçi and Yurtçu as causing "much heartburn".

== See also ==
- Censorship in Turkey
