= Ismet Cheriff Vanly =

Kurdish scholar and political activist

Member of the Kurdistan Parliament in Exile
- In office 1995 – May 1999

President of the Kurdish National Congress
- In office May 1999 – unknown

Ismet Cheriff Vanly (21 November 1924 – 2011) was a Kurdish scholar and political activist.

== Background and education ==
Ismet Cheriff Vanly was born in Syria, to Turkish parents, his father a Kurdish officer from Van.

He studied law and philosophy in France, United States, and Switzerland, gaining a PhD in jurisprudence at the University of Lausanne, and a master's degree in history from the University of Geneva, subsequently becoming a professor of political and social sciences. He spoke French, English, Arabic, and Kurdish.

== Political life ==
Vanly worked for the Kurdistan Democratic Party (KDP) from 1961 to 1975, becoming a spokesman for its leader Mustafa Barzani. On 7 October 1976, while acting as the representative for the KDP in Switzerland Vanly was shot in the head in an assassination attempt. Having survived the attack, Vanly confirmed that the gunman had previously been introduced to Vanly by the Iraqi Consul from Geneva. The Iraqi government denied responsibility.

Vanly worked with the Society for Threatened Peoples at the end of the 1970s and remained on its advisory board until his death in 2011. In 1995 he became a member of the executive council of the Kurdistan Parliament in Exile. That organization dissolved in May 1999 and became the Kurdish National Congress, for which Vanly was declared the first president.

== Death ==
He died on 9 November 2011 at home in Lausanne, Switzerland.
