= Fidan Doğan =

Kurdish activist (1982–2013)

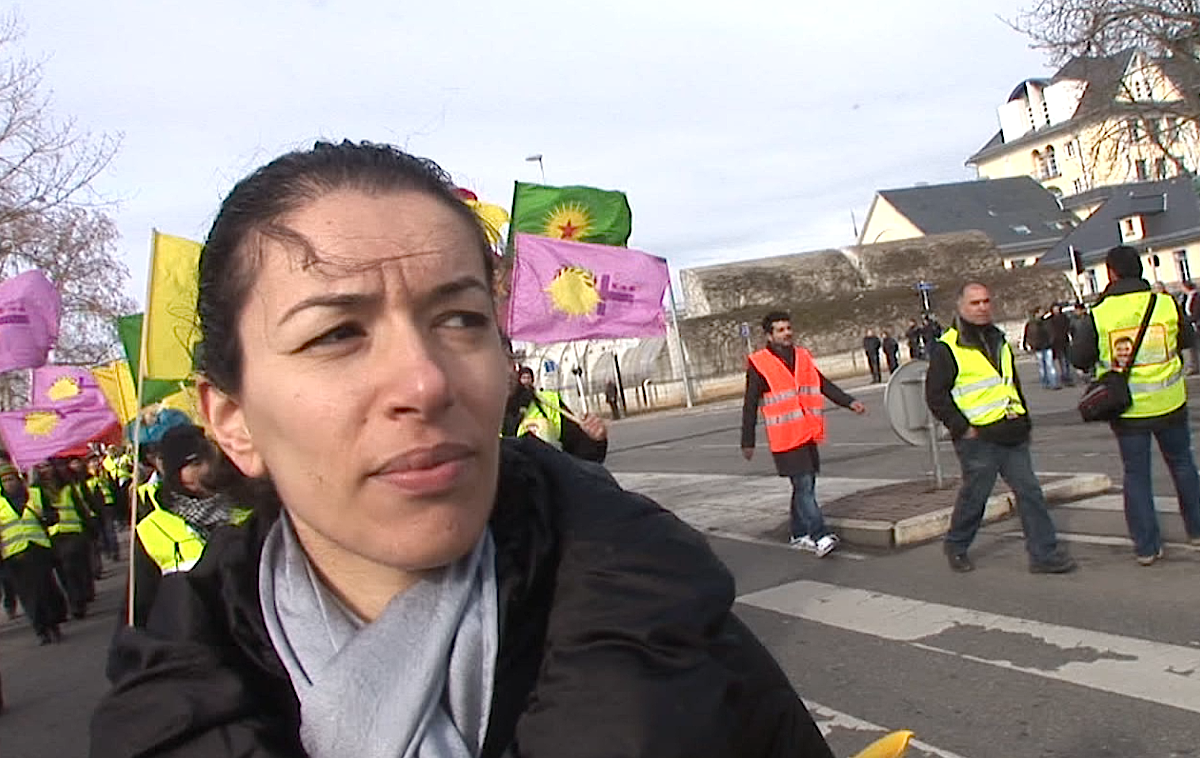
- Fidan Doğan in Strasbourg 2012
- Born: 17 January 1982; Elbistan, Kahramanmaraş, Turkey
- Died: 10 January 2013 (aged 30); Paris, France
- Cause of death: Assassinated
- Occupation: Kurdish rights advocate

Fidan Doğan (17 January 1982 – 10 January 2013) was a Kurdish activist who worked at the Kurdish information centre in Paris and also represented the Brussels-based Kurdish National Congress in France. She was assassinated in Paris on 10 January 2013, along with Sakine Cansız and Leyla Şöylemez.

== Biography ==
Born in Elbistan in southern Turkey, Doğan moved to France when she was young. She grew up in Strasbourg, where she completed her university education. She was involved in the Kurdish Information Center in Paris which is considered a liaison office to the Kurdistan Workers Party (PKK) by France Info. She was also engaged in the Kurdistan National Congress. In 2012 she was the speaker of a hunger-strikers who demanded the liberation of the imprisoned Abdullah Öcalan, the founder of the PKK.

== Assassination ==
She was assassinated in Paris on 10 January 2013, along with Sakine Cansız and Leyla Şöylemez. On 17 January in Diyarbakir tens of thousands of Kurds remembered the three women in a ceremony.

Fidan Doğa was buried in her family's village in the Elbistan district of Kahramanmaraş province, Turkey. The funeral, conducted by an Alevi dede, was attended by around 5,000 people, the coffin was wrapped in the flag of the PKK whilst mourners wore white scarves to symbolise peace. The mourners included Peace and Democracy Party co-chair Gülten Kışanak, and deputies Nursel Aydoğan, Ayla Akat Ata, Hasip Kaplan as well as the mayor of Diyarbakır Osman Baydemir. Speaking at the funeral, Kışanak is quoted as saying; "We promise to all Kurdish women and these three women: We will bring peace and freedom to this land,”.

== Aftermath ==
Tributes after her death revealed that she was well known in political circles. The President of the European Parliament, Martin Schulz, made a point of receiving her family to pay his condolences in person. The rapporteur for Turkey of the Council of Europe's Parliamentary Assembly, Josette Durrieu, also paid tribute in glowing terms.

François Hollande's statement that he knew one of the three women assassinated in Paris (which provoked a strong reaction from Turkish Prime Minister Recep Tayyip Erdoğan), raised speculation that Doğan was also in regular contact with the French president.

After her death, there was considerable speculation that the killing of the three women was an attempt to derail the fledgling peace process that had recently begun between the Turkish authorities and Öcalan.

== See also ==
- List of unsolved murders (2000–present)
