= Civil Rights Defenders =

Sweden-based non-governmental organisation

- Founded: 1982; 44 years ago
- Type: Non-profit; NGO; Human rights organisation
- Registration no.: 802011-1442 (Sweden)
- Purpose: Human rights Civil and political rights
- Headquarters: Östgötagatan 90; Stockholm; Sweden
- Region served: Eastern Europe; Central Asia; Europe; Southeast Asia; Latin America; East Africa
- Key people: Sofia Walan, Executive Director; Hanna Gerdes, Chair of the Board; Gerald Nagler, Founder and Honorary Chair of the Board
- Website: crd.org
- Formerly called: Swedish Helsinki Committee

Civil Rights Defenders (Formerly the Swedish Helsinki Committee) is an international non-governmental organisation based in Stockholm, Sweden, that does human rights work with a focus on civil and political rights. They primarily work to support local human rights defenders by providing them with capacity building, training, and funding, as well as security and emergency support for human rights defenders at risk.

Founded in 1982 as the Swedish Helsinki Committee, the original focus of Civil Rights Defenders was to monitor and support the civil rights portion of the Helsinki Accords. In 2009, the organisation changed its name to Civil Rights Defenders and it now works in Sweden, Eastern Europe, Central Asia, Southeast Asia, the Western Balkans, Latin America, and in East & Horn of Africa.

== History ==
Civil Rights Defenders was founded in 1982 as the Swedish Helsinki Committee for Human Rights (Svenska Helsingforskommittén för mänskliga rättigheter) to monitor compliance with the human rights provisions of the Helsinki Final Act, along with Helsinki Committees for Human Rights in several countries. Gerald Nagler, who also co-founded the International Helsinki Federation for Human Rights, was the founder of the Swedish Helsinki Committee, and then also Chairman of the organisation from 1992 until 2004. Robert Hårdh led the organisation as Secretary General from 2000 until 2009 and then as Executive Director until 2017. Between 2018 and 2024, Anders L. Pettersson] served as Executive Director of Civil Rights Defenders. In May 2025, Sofia Walan took office as Executive Director of Civil Rights Defenders.

After the fall of the Berlin Wall, the organisation also worked to monitor and improve the human rights situation in the former Yugoslavia throughout the conflicts of the 1990s. In 2009, the Swedish Helsinki Committee changed its name to Civil Rights Defenders, and began working in additional regions of the world with the primary mission to support local human rights groups in repressive countries. They also now act as a watchdog human rights organisation in Sweden.

== Natalia Project ==
The Natalia Project is an alarm system for human rights defenders at risk that helps to ensure the survival of human rights defenders. It was launched in 2013, and is named after Natalia Estemirova, a Russian human rights activist and recipient of the Right Livelihood Award who was abducted and murdered in 2009 while working to document cases of human rights abuses in Chechnya.

The device uses cellphone and satellite navigation technology to transmit an alarm signal that its bearer is in acute danger. Triggering the alarm transmits data about the bearer's location and personal details to enable a local and global response. Each Natalia Project participant receives security training and develops an incident response protocol based on their specific circumstances.

Program Participants: Frank Mugisha (Uganda), Olena Shevchenko (Ukraine), Génesis Dávila (Venezuela), Abdifatah Hassan Ali (Somalia).

== Defenders’ Days and Civil Rights Defender of the Year Award ==
Since 2013, Civil Rights Defenders has organised the human rights conference, "Defenders' Days", now held in Stockholm every two years. The conference's main aim is to develop human rights activists working within their own repressive countries.

Civil Rights Defenders also annually awards the Civil Rights Defender of the Year Award to a human rights defender. According to Civil Rights Defenders, the award is given to someone who “despite the risk to his or her own safety, strives to ensure that people’s civil and political rights are recognised and protected. Their work is carried out without the use of violence and within an independent human rights organisation.”

=== Recipients ===
Previous Civil Rights Defender of the Year Award recipients are:

Year	Recipient	Country	Ref
2013	Nataša Kandić, the Humanitarian Law Center	Serbia	
2014	Ales Bialiatski, the Human Rights Centre Viasna	Belarus	
2015	Nguyễn Ngọc Như Quỳnh (pen name: Me Nam, or Mother Mushroom), Vietnamese Bloggers Network	Vietnam	
2016	Intigam Aliyev, Legal Education Society	Azerbaijan	
2017	Edmund Yakani, Community Empowerment for Progress Organisation	South Sudan	
2018	Murat Çelikkan, Hafıza Merkezi (Truth Justice Memory Center)	Turkey	
2019	Márta Pardavi, Hungarian Helsinki Committee	Hungary	
2020	Naw Ohn Hla, Karen Democracy Activist	Myanmar	
2021	OVD-Info, Human Rights and Media Project	Russia	
2022	Xheni Karaj and Frank Mugisha, providing protection and community for LGBTI+ persons in Albania and Uganda	Albania, Uganda	
2023	Foro Penal, Human Rights Organisation	Venezuela	
2024	Marija Suljalina, Almenda	Ukraine	
2025	Syrian Center for Media and Freedom of Expression (SCM), Human Rights Organisation	Syria	
2026	Netgazeti and La Hora de Cuba, independent news outlets	Georgia, Cuba	
