= Killing of the Karakaya family =

Bombing in Turkey, 2018

Killing of Nurcan and Mustafa Bedirhan Karakaya
- Part of Kurdistan Workers' Party insurgency
- Left to right; Nurcan and Mustafa Bedirhan Karakaya
- Location: Yüksekova, Hakkâri Province, Turkey
- Date: 31 July 2018 c. 16:00
- Attack type: Bombing
- Weapon: IED
- Deaths: 2
- Perpetrator: Kurdistan Workers’ Party (according to Turkey)
- Assailants: Evin Sevim; Metin Daşdemir; Yavuz Bozkurt

On 31 July 2018, around 4 p.m., Nurcan Karakaya (aged 25) and her 10-month-old son, Mustafa Bedirhan Karakaya, were killed in Yüksekova, Hakkâri Province, Turkey. They were travelling by vehicle when an explosive device planted on the road detonated, killing both of them. Turkey alleged that the attack was perpetrated by the Kurdistan Workers’ Party (PKK).

== Background ==
Nurcan Karakaya was the wife of a serving Turkish military officer, Serkan Karakaya, a Jandarma (gendarmerie) non-commissioned officer. He was transferred to Yüksekova district of Hakkari a month before the incident. While some sources claim Mustafa Bedirhan Karakaya was 11 months old, reports identify his birth date as 19 October 2017, meaning he was 10 months old when he died.

== Incident ==
On 31 July 2018, Nurcan Karakaya travelled with her son, Mustafa Bedirhan, to visit her husband, Serkan Karakaya. She brought pastries that she had prepared for her husband and the other soldiers. After spending the day with Serkan, Nurcan and Mustafa left the military post. As their vehicle travelled through the Susak Deresi area near Büyükçiftlik, an explosive device planted on the road detonated. Nurcan died at the scene, while Mustafa Bedirhan was taken to Yüksekova State Hospital with severe injuries where he lated died.

== Perpetrator ==
On 11 May 2019, the Hakkâri Governor’s Office announced that a suspected member of the PKK had been captured during an operation in Yeniışık village in the Yüksekova district, while another person was taken into custody. According to the governor’s office, the detained suspects were identified as being responsible for several attacks during 2016 and 2018, including the attack that killed Nurcan Karakaya and her son, Mustafa Bedirhan Karakaya. Turkish Media names the captured suspects as; Metin Daşdemir, who was reportedly codenamed “Azat” and Evin Sevim, codenamed “Rojevin”. Evim Sevim was 5 months pregnant when she was captured. The Hakkari Governor also reported the capture of a third alleged perpetrator, Yavuz Bozkurt.

== Aftermath ==
In August 2018 the PKK issued a statement regarding the incident; "they have carried out attacks in this region recently, but it cannot be confirmed that this incident was carried out by their members." The statement clarified that Karakaya and her baby were not a target, adding, "If such an event occurred, it was definitely a mistake." They also accused Turkish Media of "psychological warfare".

On 1 August 2018, President of Turkey, Recep Tayyip Erdoğan attended the funeral ceremony for Nurcan Karakaya and Mustafa Bedirhan in Şarkışla, Sivas Province. Erdoğan offered his condolences to the family and carried Nurcan’s coffin alongside her husband, Serkan. Erdogan said at the funeral service; "They (PKK) will pay for the massacre,". He also added “You know my feelings about the death penalty. I would approve it if parliament were to pass the law again,”. Capital punishment being restored is unlikely as it would end Turkey’s bid to join the European Union.

On 15 August 2018, around 15 days after the attack, Turkey carried out an operation named after Mustafa Bedirhan Karakaya in Sinjar, Iraq, killing Yazidi PKK figure Ismail Özden. In total 5 members of the Yazidi militia, YBŞ were killed.

== Reactions ==
Turkish politician and MHP Chairman, Devlet Bahçeli issued a statement condemning the attack and described it as a “massacre” and “crime against humanity”. The CHP and the pro-Kurdish People's Democratic Party (HDP) condemned the attack. The hashtag “#BabyKillerPKK” was widely shared on social media.

== Memorials ==
In September 2018, a children’s park in Şarkışla was also named after Mustafa. A monument bearing his photograph was unveiled at the park. A kindergarten in Kepez, Antalya, was built and named the Şehit Bebek Mustafa Bedirhan Karakaya Anaokulu. It was opened in November 2018 in a ceremony attended by Interior Minister Süleyman Soylu and Mustafa’s father, Serkan Karakaya. In 2019, a library at Ahmet Turgay İmamgiller Vocational and Technical Anatolian High School in Şarkışla was also named after Mustafa. There is a youth and sports facilities complex in Şarkışla bearing Mustafas name, which was nearing completion by February 2024. It was officially opened during the 2024 anniversary commemorations.
