= Murat Çelikkan =

Murat Çelikkan is a Turkish human rights defender and journalist. He is founder of some human rights organizations in Turkey: Human Rights Association, Amnesty International Turkey and Citizens Assembly and co-director of Hafıza Merkezi (Truth Justice Memory Center)

He was awarded the Civil Rights Defender of the Year Award 2018, by Civil Rights Defenders.

== Education and work ==
Murat Çelikkan graduated from Middle East Technical University. He is a recent alumnus of the Columbia University Institute for the Study of Human Rights Alliance for Historical Dialogue and Accountability Program. He took part in Editors in Chief on Watch campaign for the newspaper Özgür Gündem. For this he was sentenced to 18 months imprisonment in 2017.
