= Turkish airstrikes on Sinjar (2021) =

- Part of the Kurdish–Turkish conflict (1978–present)
Date	16 August 2021
Location	Sinjar, Iraqi Kurdistan; Sikeniye village, Sinjar District
Result	Assassination of Seîd Hesen

Belligerents
Turkey	Sinjar Resistance Units (YBŞ)

Commanders and leaders
(Turkey) Unknown	Seîd Hesen †

Casualties and losses
None	11 killed: Seîd Hesen, his nephew and a YBŞ fighter Îsa Xwedêda.; 4 YBŞ fighters, Hemîd Sadun (Qîran Sîba) and Xidir Şeref (Pîr Xidir), Rami al-Salim (Ronî) and Meytem Khidir Khalaf (Serhed Zemar); 4 hospital's health staff, Elî Reşo Xidir, Sedo Îlyas Reşo, Hecî Xidir and Muhlise Sîdar; Wounded : 3 people; 4 hospital's health staff

The August 16 and 17, 2021 Turkish airstrikes on Sinjar were several airstrikes on Sinjar District which targeted the Sinjar Resistance Units (YBŞ) fighters including Seîd Hesen, a leading member of that organization, and also bombing a hospital in the Sikeniye village. Except Hesen two others were killed in the airstrike of 16 August including Seid Hesen's nephew and a YBŞ fighter Îsa Xwedêda, and three others also wounded. As a result of 17 August airstrikes which targeted the hospital of Sikeniye, eight people were assassinated including four hospital staff and four YBŞ fighters who were responsible for the security of the hospital.

== Attack to a vehicle ==
On Monday 16 August 2021 at 12:10 Turkish reconnaissance aircraft attacked a vehicle on the road to the old market in centre of Shengal city. As a result of the attack Sinjar Resistance Units (YBŞ) commander Seîd Hesen and his nephew and a YBŞ fighter Îsa Xwedêda were assassinated and also three civilians Qasim Simo, Şamir Abbas Berces and Mirza Ali were injured.

Many thousands of people attended the funeral of the killed and the funeral turned into a protest against the Turkish attack in South Kurdish self-governing region of Şengal.

== Attack on Sikeniye hospital ==
On Tuesday 17 August 2021 at 14:30 till 15:00 Turkish fighter jets bombed a hospital in the Sikeniye village in the Yazidi district of Shengal (Sinjar). Upon the announcement of Shengal Democratic Autonomous Assembly the hospital has been bombed four times, and civilians such sick people, doctors, nursing staff were the main targets of this attack and the YBŞ fighters who were killed in this airstrike were responsible for the security of the hospital. The attack has resulted in injuries. Turkish aircraft also target the people who have rushed to hospital for the evacuation of those inside. As a result of Turkey's attack on this hospital eight people including four YBŞ fighters and four staff members of the hospital have been killed and four others also injured. The names of four YBŞ fighters are Hemîd Sadun (Qîran Sîba) and Xidir Şeref (Pîr Xidir), Arab YBŞ fighters Rami al-Salim (Ronî) and Meytem Khidir Khalaf (Serhed Zemar); and the names of four health staff of the hospital are Elî Reşo Xidir, Sedo Îlyas Reşo, Hecî Xidir and Muhlise Sîdar; and also the wounded are Hesen, Evdi, Semir and Macid all from the health personnel.

== Situation in Turkey ==
The Turkish Ministry of National Defense has not yet made a statement. There was no previous information about such an operation. People became aware of the situation with the #TurkeyattacksYazidis hashtag on Twitter.

== See also ==
- List of assassinations of the Kurdish–Turkish conflict
