= Turkish airstrikes on Sinjar (2018) =

Attack on Yazidis by Turkey

Operation Tigris Shield
- Part of the Kurdish–Turkish conflict (1978–present)
Date	15 August 2018
Location	Snune, Sinjar, Iraqi Kurdistan
Result	Turkish victory • Assassination of İsmail Özden

Belligerents
Turkey	Sinjar Resistance Units (YBŞ); Kurdistan Workers' Party (PKK)

Commanders and leaders
(Turkey) Unknown	İsmail Özden (Zaki Shingali) †

Casualties and losses
None	5 killed: Ismail Ozden and 4 others. Wounded : Tel Ezeir (Harbo), a member of the Self-Administrative Council.; Mazlum Shingal (Haval Mazlum), the YBŞ general commander in Shingal.

The August 15, 2018, Turkish airstrikes on Sinjar were two airstrikes on İsmail Özden, a leading member of the Sinjar Resistance Units (YBŞ). Four others were killed in the airstrike.

== Background ==
In the 21st century, Iraqi Peshmerga, ISIS, YBŞ-PKK, Iraqi Army, and militias have battled for control over the Sinjar area.

In August 2014, an offensive by ISIS upon Yazidi-held towns and the surprise withdrawal of Peshmerga forces based there left the local communities severely out-powered by ISIS militants. Mass executions of men and enslavement of Yazidi women and children took place, now referred as the Sinjar massacres and Yazidis genocide by ISIL. As locals took refuge in the hard-to-reach Sinjar mountains, ISIS set siege of the mountain range. On 9–11 August, a joint offensive by Syrian-Kurds PKK-YPG and USAF broke Sinjar siege and secured an escape corridor from Sinjar mountains to Syria's autonomous Rojava area. Later, the December 2014 Sinjar offensive with PKK-affiliated and Peshmerga forces supported by USAF's air surveillance and military support took firm control of the area. YPG took control of Yazidi area and kept both ISIS and Peshmerga forces at bay, continuing the building of local, PKK-inspired Sinjar Resistance Units (YBŞ). These YBŞ were led by Sheikh Khairy Khedr (d. 2014) and Zaki Shingali (d. 2018), himself referring to Qandil's PKK leadership.

== The strikes ==
On 15 August 2018, the Turkish Armed Forces (Turkish: Türk Silahlı Kuvvetleri, TSK) in cooperation with the National Intelligence Organization of Turkey (Turkish: Milli İstihbarat Teşkilatı, MİT) carried out a cross-border airstrike into Iraqi territory. The operation was named "Bedirhan Mustafa Karakaya" after a ten-month baby boy, who was killed along with his mother by an improvised explosive device of the PKK in their private car on the return way after their visit to the father serving as a gendarmerie sergeant stationed at Yüksekova, Hakkari, southeastern Turkey on 31 July 2018. The MİT was able to listen Özden's satellite phone, and to localize his whereabouts. His activity was observed for three days. Turkey's drones initially wanted to bomb Singal's camp but eventually targeted his convoy instead, due to local intelligence and drone surveillance. A Turkish intelligence unit reported that Özden arrived in Kocho village at around 12:00 hours local time on 15 August 2018 for a ceremony in commemoration of the victims of the Sinjar massacre, which was perpetrated by the Islamic State of Iraq and the Levant (ISIL) on the resident Yazidis in early August 2014. He remained about three and half hours in the region. Due to the presence of a large number of civilians around him, no operation started. He left the meeting place at around 15:30 in an armored vehicle in a convoy of four cars, which was observed by air and land around 20 minutes long. The entire operation took two hours and 24 minutes after the secret information was gathered by the Turkish side. The US may have provided intelligence to their Turkey allies. A video of the strike has since been published, showing the Turkish army's drone tracking and firing on two cars. When Shingali's car stopped by the road's side, a drone targeted and hit the car. People rushed in, and are seen moving the wounded or dead to a second car. The second car, transporting Shingali, was targeted by the Turkish drone in turn, and destroyed.

According to a spokesman of the Multi-National Force in Iraq, "Turkey alerted the Coalition of their intentions to strike in the Sinjar area, but did not give any further targeting information".

== Reactions ==
- Yazidis: Singali is considered a hero to many Yazidis, due to his 2014 leadership in breaking Mount Sinjar siege and leading its following emergency evacuation against ongoing ISIS, summary executions of men and enslavement of Yazidi women and children, since referred to as the 2014 Sinjar massacre.
- UN Nikki Haley commented: "Today Turkey carried several air strikes in different locations in Sinjar. Sinjar continues to be a war zone. How can Yazidis recover from this genocide, or go back home?".
- Iraq, Ahmed Mahjoob, spokesperson for the Foreign Ministry: "The Iraqi Foreign Ministry condemns the Turkish airstrikes on Sinjar within the civilian-populated areas".
- Turkey, Turkish army General staff: "İsmail Özden, a member of the PKK executive committee and the terrorist group's senior figure in Sinjar … was eliminated during an operation conducted by the Turkish Armed Forces and intelligence on August 15."
- Nadia Murad also criticized the Turkish airstrikes, alleging they were executed on the anniversary of the massacres committed by ISIL against the Yazidi in the village Kocho.
