= Özgürlükçü Demokrasi =

Turkish Kurdish newspaper

- Publisher: Mevlüt Gür
- Editor-in-chief: Ersin Çaksu
- General manager: Harun Epli
- Founded: 30 May 1992
- Ceased publication: 16 August 2016
- Headquarters: Beyoğlu
- City: Istanbul
- Country: Turkey

Özgürlükçü Demokrasi (Turkish for "Libertarian democracy") is an Istanbul-based online newspaper in Turkish language that primarily targets readers of Kurdish origin. It was launched on 23 August 2016, only days after pro-Kurdish newspaper Özgür Gündem was closed following a court ruling. Its website is not accessible in Turkey.
