= Leyla Birlik =

Kurdish politician from Turkey

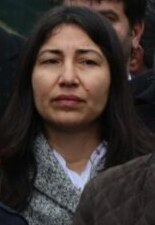
- Birlik in 2018

Member of the Turkish Grand National Assembly for Şırnak
- In office 7 June 2015 – 1 November 2015
- In office 1 November 2015 – 24 June 2018

Personal details
- Born: March 3, 1974 (age 52) Derik, Mardin Province, Turkey
- Citizenship: Turkish
- Party: Peoples' Democratic Party
- Spouse: Mehmet Birlik
- Children: 1
- Profession: politician
- Committees: Women Committee, Kurdistan National Congress

Leyla Birlik (born 3 March 1974, Derik, Mardin) is a Kurdish politician of the Peoples' Democratic Party (HDP) and a former member of the Grand National Assembly of Turkey. She is currently a member of the executive council and the head of the Women Committee in the Kurdistan National Congress.

== Political career ==
Before she became a Member of Parliament she served as the president of the local council in Şırnak. Birlik was elected to the Turkish parliament in the general elections in June 2015 and re-elected in the snap elections of November 2015 both times representing Şırnak for the HDP.

=== Legal prosecution ===
She was arrested on the 4 November 2016 together with fellow HDP MPs Nursel Aydoğan, Selahattin Demirtaş, İdris Baluken, Figen Yüksekdag and Gülser Yildirim. She was charged with having insulted the president of Turkey, Recep Tayyip Erdoğan in a speech she held in 2015 or having attended the funeral of her brother in law, who the prosecution sees as a member of the Kurdistan Workers' Party (PKK). European parliamentarians from Austria around Peter Pilz, were not allowed to visit her at the time by the Turkish authorities. She was released pending trial on the 4 January 2017. The same court also issued also a prohibition on travels abroad. In January 2018 she was sentenced to 1 year and 9 months imprisonment for insulting the president. She appealed the verdict.

== In exile ==
In August 2018, she fled to Oristiada, Greece and applied for asylum. In December she was sentenced to a prison term again, this time for violating a law concerning on meetings and manifestations. From Greece she traveled on to Germany where she also applied for asylum and it was granted. It was reported that a file with informations about her was confiscated by the Turkish authorities following the arrest of the lawyer of the German Embassy.

== Personal life ==
She is married to Mehmet Birlik and has a child. Her first term as an MP was marked by the fact that her brother in law Hacı Lokman Birlik was killed by Turkish security forces, tied to a police car and dragged through the streets of Şırnak on in October 2015. The father of Haci Lokman Birlik was later prosecuted for attending his sons funeral.
