= Sakine Cansız =

Kurdish activist, co-founder of PKK

- Born: 1958; Tunceli, Turkey
- Died: 10 January 2013 (aged 54–55); Rue La Fayette, Paris, France
- Cause of death: Assassination
- Resting place: Cansız, Tunceli, Turkey
- Occupation: Kurdish rights advocate
- Organization: Kurdistan Workers' Party (PKK)

Sakine Cansız (Turkish pronunciation: [saːciˈne dʒanˈsɯz]; Kurdish: Sakîne Cansiz, IPA: [sɑːkiːnɛ dʒɑːnsɪz]; 1958 – 10 January 2013) was one of the co-founders of the Kurdistan Workers' Party (PKK). A Kurdish activist and in the 1980s, she was arrested and tortured by Turkish police. A close associate of Abdullah Öcalan and a senior member of the PKK, she was shot dead during the triple murder of Kurdish activists in Paris, France, on 10 January 2013, along with two other female Kurdish activists, Fidan Doğan and Leyla Söylemez.

== Early life ==
Cansız was born around 1958 in Tunceli, to a Kurdish Alevi family. She had seven siblings and she was the eldest daughter. She went to primary and secondary school in Tunceli. In secondary school, she was influenced by her teacher Yusuf Kenan Deniz, who introduced his class to the Dev-Genç, the Revolutionary Youth Federation of Turkey. She began to hear about Denis Gezmis on the radio and saw posters of him depicted as a hero. Other posters were more critical. Cansız and her friends took down the posters, with negative depictions. In middle school, she experienced dissent for the first time, and learned to be discreet. In 1969, her father migrated to Germany.

In 1973, she and her elder brother followed their father to Berlin, Germany. After 11 months in Berlin she returned to Tunceli, where she began to study at the Gymnasium and became engaged to Metin. She began to take part in revolutionary activities, which were not endorsed by the family of her fiancée. She fled to Ankara where she first met Abdullah Öcalan, with whom she would work closely. In an interview, she said of this period: "In a sense I abandoned the family. I did not accept that pressure, insisting on revolutionism. That's how I left and went to Ankara. In secret of course."

== Activities ==
She was one of the PKK's founding members (code name "Sara"), and the organization's first senior female member. At the founding meeting of the PKK in Lice in southern Turkey in late September or November 1978 (with 22 persons attending), she represented Elâzığ, the administrative center of Elâzığ Province. Cansız and Öcalan's former wife Kesire Yıldırım were the only women who participated in this meeting. Cansız was arrested in 1979 soon after graduating high school. According to The Guardian, she was arrested just after the 1980 Turkish coup d'état. Cansiz was imprisoned along with other members of the PKK. She spent years in jail in Diyarbakir where 34 inmates died of torture between the years 1981 and 1989. The treatment that they received in the prison was horrible and was one of the main reasons for the organizations radicalization and the increased armed struggle against the Turkish that began in 1984. While in jail, Cansiz continued her work for the Kurdish movement, becoming a "legend among PKK members".

After her release in 1991, Cansız stayed in the PKK camps in Lebanon's Beqaa Valley and then in northern Iraq where she fought under the command of Osman Ocalan. In addition to fighting she organized and headed women squads of the PKK there. She went to Europe in the mid-1990s. Murat Karayılan sent her there to be responsible for the PKK's European branch, first in Germany and then in France, to deal with the group's civil affairs. According to Hürriyet, she was moved to Europe after having opposed the execution of PKK member Mehmet Şener. France granted Cansız asylum in 1998 after she had disagreed with some senior PKK figures. She was detained in Hamburg in March 2007 upon Turkeys request, but released after protests opposing her detention in April 2007.

Reportedly, "she was the most prominent and most important female Kurdish activist. She did not shy away from speaking her mind, especially when it came to women's issues."

== Assassination ==
On 10 January 2013, Cansız, in her 50s, was found dead with two other Kurdish female activists, Fidan Doğan and Leyla Şaylemez. Autopsy results placed the time of death for the three women as sometime between 6pm and 7pm on the day before. Their bodies were found in the Kurdistan Information Center in Paris.

The three women were last seen inside an information center on a Wednesday afternoon, hours later a member of the Kurdish community tried to visit the center but the door was locked. The three women were found dead with gunshot wounds in the information center on Thursday morning. That was the first time that a senior member of the PKK had been killed in Europe.

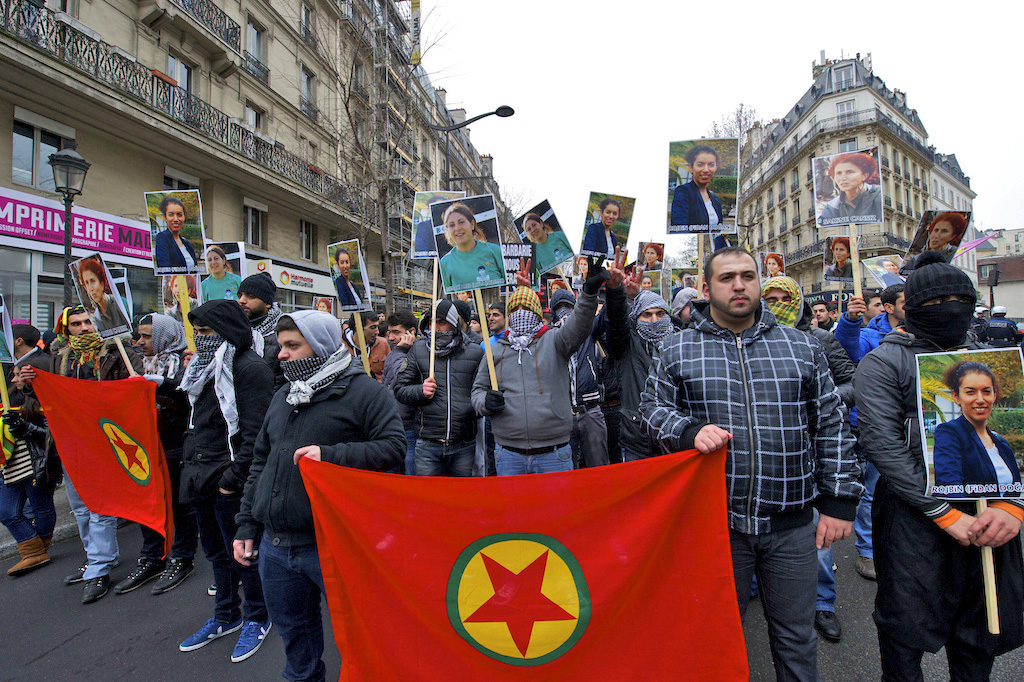
Demonstration by Kurds in Paris following murders

The killings occurred at a time when the Turkish government was in negotiation with PKK leaders including Öcalan. PKK activists in Paris considered the murders an attempt by "dark forces" within the Turkish government to derail these negotiations. The PKK blamed the Turkish government. Turkish officials pointed at frequent strife within the PKK, with the Turkish national daily Hürriyet claiming that Cansız had been in conflict with Bahoz Erdal, the alleged commander of the PKK's military wing. Also killed were Fidan Doğan of the Kurdistan National Congress (based in Brussels) and Leyla Söylemez, a "junior activist". The French interior minister Manuel Valls announced that the three women were all killed execution-style. Two days after the murder, Ömer Güney was detained and later prosecuted for the assassination of the three women. The prosecutor François Molins concluded that the surveillance cameras showed that Ömer Güney was within the Kurdish Information Center during the time of the assassination. And on his bag was found gunpowder.

On 17 December 2016, Ömer Güney, the sole suspect in the assassination of Sakine Cansız, Fidan Doğan and Leyla Şaylemez died of a severe illness in his Paris prison cell. After his death the French authority decided to close the investigation into the assassination of the three women. In May 2019 the investigation was reopened.

== Funeral ==
The body of Cansız together with those of the other two women murdered was brought from Paris to Istanbul on 16 January 2013 and transferred to Diyarbakır. A funeral ceremony for the three slain women was held in Diyarbakır with the attendance of tens of thousands of Kurds on 17 January 2013. Each was buried in her hometown: Cansız in Tunceli, Doğan in Kahramanmaraş, and Söylemez in Mersin.

=== Reactions ===
Both Turkey and France condemned the killings of the three women. Turkish Prime Minister Recep Tayyip Erdoğan suggested that the murders were done for two possible reasons: 1) to derail the current negotiations or 2) to carry out an internal execution within the PKK. Turkey's Deputy Prime Minister and government spokesman Bülent Arınç condemned the attack and expressed his condolences.

== See also ==
- List of unsolved murders (2000–present)
