= Engin Çeber =

- Born: May 5, 1979
- Died: October 8, 2008 (aged 29); Istanbul, Turkey
- Occupation: human rights activist
- Known for: death by torture

Engin Çeber (May 5, 1979 – October 8, 2008) was a Turkish human rights activist who was tortured and killed while in police custody. In 2012, twelve prison guards and officials received prison sentences in connection with this death, causing Amnesty International to call it a "landmark case".

== Background ==
Çeber was arrested in 2008 after he criticized authorities for not investigating or punishing police officers for the shooting and paralyzing of a left-wing activist. He was sent to a prison in Istanbul, where he was severely beaten. After complaining to his lawyer, he was sent to a hospital, where he fell into a coma, dying of a brain hemorrhage on October 8. Amnesty International criticized Turkey's human rights record arguing that the death is "further proof that torture and ill-treatment are rife in places of detention in Turkey", despite the government "zero-tolerance" against torture. Shortly after Çeber's death, Mehmet Ali Sahin, Turkey's justice minister apologized and announced that 19 officials were suspended pending investigation.

In October 2011, four officials received life sentences for their role in Ceber's death. However, this verdict was overturned by the Supreme Court of Appeals, which ruled that the sharing of a lawyer by the defendants had interfered with their right to a free trial. Sixty defendants were then retried. In the verdict of the second case on 2 October 2012, two prison guards and their supervisor were convicted of having tortured Çeber to death and given life sentences. Nine other officials also received prison sentences for their roles. Amnesty International hailed the verdict as "a historic moment for justice in the country".
