= Death of Hacı Lokman Birlik =

Hacı Lokman Birlik was killed during a conflict between him and the Turkish Army on 2 or 3 October 2015. His dead body was tied to an armoured police vehicle in Şırnak, Turkey, an event that the Turkish police filmed and shared on social media. The Turkish Ministry of the Interior confirmed the dragging of the body, justifying it by saying that authorities were concerned that a bomb may have been attached to the body.

== Victim ==
Hacı Lokman Birlik was born on 16 September 1988. He was the brother-in-law of Leyla Birlik, an MP for the Kurdish Peoples' Democratic Party (HDP). He had produced and starred in the short movie Bark, about the choice Kurds make between rebellion and the Turkish government, with the support of the Municipality and Youth Working Group of Şırnak.

== Death ==
There are conflicting reports about how Birlik died. Reports say he died on 2 or 3 October 2015. Turkish officials, such as the Prime Minister Ahmet Davutoğlu, claim he was shot whilst attacking the police with a rocket launcher. DIHA reported Birlik was shot by the police whilst treating a wound he had; with the People's Democratic Party MP Ferhat Encü reasoning similarly. According to an autopsy report, he was shot twenty-eight times, before his body was tied by the neck to a Scorpion armored police vehicle and dragged through the streets of Şırnak. Images of Birlik being dragged were uploaded to Twitter. When the images appeared on social media, a debate ensued between those who claimed the images were photoshopped and those who deemed them to be genuine images.

The pro-AKP newspaper Sabah claimed the dragging of a body was a universally acceptable procedure to verify whether a bomb was attached to the body. Later a video which showed the dragging of Birlik surfaced, which was filmed from inside the vehicle. Slurs and insults could be heard. Deniz Yücel of the German newspaper Die Welt assumed Birlik was really dragged behind an armored police car. Later, the Turkish Ministry of the Interior confirmed that the dragging of the dead body occurred: They justified the dragging by explaining police assumed the body had a bomb attached to it.

== Reactions ==
The images caused a public outcry by the politicians of the HDP and the Government. Selahattin Demirtaş, the co-chair of the HDP at the time, uploaded a photograph of the event the next day on Twitter, demanding the people should not forget what they see.

In October 2020, HDP MP Nuran İmir demanded an answer from the Justice Minister Abdülhamit Gül, and questioned the fact that while several of the officers involved in the police operations in Şırnak were charged for being a member of the Gülen Movement, there were none being investigated for the death of Birlik.

In 2018, Hacı Murad Dinçer, the Turkish police officer in charge of the Anti Terror unit in Şırnak at the time of Birlik's death, received an award from the Turkish president Recep Tayyip Erdogan for his services in Şırnak. Dinçer also applied to be a candidate for the Grand National Assembly of Turkey for the Justice and Development Party (AKP).

== Investigation and prosecution ==
On 5 October 2015 the Ministry of the Interior initiated an investigation if the events depicted in the photo took place. According to the Turkish BBC, his aunt acknowledged he joined the Kurdistan Workers' Party (PKK) during the Ramadan and that at the time he was shot, he was bandaging a wound he had. An image of the dragging of Haci Lokman was also sent to Leyla Birliks Twitter account from one with the name Jitem (Turkish Gendarmerie Intelligence). By 7 October 2015, the HDP issued complaints against the Minister of the Interior Selamik Altinok and the Governor and the police chief of Şırnak, while Demirtaş demanded Altinok step down. On 12 October Turkish officials claimed two of the involved officers had been dismissed, but according to Kurdish sources, they were are still on duty in another location. The family of Birlik also pressed charges against the police officer who they deemed responsible for having ordered the dragging of their relative. By 2020, the investigation was focused on the fact that the images were uploaded on social media. After six different prosecutors refused to conduct an investigation into the events, the lawyer representing Birlik went to the Constitutional Court.

Prime Minister Ahmet Davutoglu made assurances in an interview with Habertürk TV that an investigation would be conducted not into the incident itself, but how the images were perceived by the international media.

Internet access to news reporting of the event from more than one hundred outlets was prohibited by several courts. Newspaper BirGün appealed the decision at the Turkish Criminal Judgeship of Peace in Gölbasi in 2015, however their case was dismissed. Birgün then appealed to the Constitutional Court, where in 2019 the court ruled Birgün's rights of freedom of expression were violated.

=== Prosecution of Hacı Lokman Birlik's family members ===
The father of Hacı Lokman Birlik was later prosecuted for being a member of a terrorist organization at a court in Şırnak, but was acquitted. The prosecution appealed the verdict at a court in Diyarbakir, which recognized that Hasan Birlik waved a flag with the Kurdish colors and shouted "Martyrs don't die" at his son's funeral, which was seen as an act of "terrorist propaganda". His sister-in-law Leyla Birlik was also prosecuted for being a member of a terrorist organization, due to her attendance at the funeral, and in 2018 left Turkey into exile. The prosecution deemed Hacı Lokman Birlik a member of the PKK.

== See also ==
- Death of İpek Er
- Police brutality in Turkey
- Engin Çeber
