= İsmail Özden =

Yazidi Kurdish rebels

- Born: 1952; Beşiri, Turkey
- Died: 15 August 2018 (aged 65–66); Sinjar, Iraq
- Cause of death: Airstrike
- Other name: Mam Zêki Shingali
- Organization: Kurdistan Communities Union
- Known for: Defense of the Yazidi in Sinjar
- Political party: Kurdistan Workers' Party (PKK)
- Opponents: Islamic State of Iraq and the Levant; Turkey

İsmail Özden (1952 – 15 August 2018), also known as Mam Zêki Shingali, was a member of the Kurdistan Workers' Party (PKK), famous for the leading role he played in the resistance to the conquest of Sinjar by ISIL. He was killed on 15 August 2018 in a Turkish Air Force airstrike.

== Early life ==
Ismail Özden was born in 1952 to Yazidi parents in Beşiri. He attended primary school in the village but dropped out of secondary school. In 1969, at the age of 17, he moved to Germany upon the invitation of his brothers. He settled in Celle, where a Yazidi diaspora community was already present.

== Political and military career ==
In 1978, Özden met sympathizers of the PKK and began to get involved in propaganda work for the party. In 1981 he became the founding president of the Kurdistan Patriotic Workers Association (Komeleya Karkerên Welatparêzên Kurdistanê) in Celle. Also in 1981, he began to be involved in publishing the Sêrxwebun, a publication of the PKK. In 1985 Özden travelled to the PKK training camps and met Abdullah Öcalan, the PKK's leader. By 1987 he was a ranking member of the PKK. Due to his prior experience with the Kurdish movement in Europe, Özden was sent back to Germany by the PKK. Between 1992 and 1996, he worked for the PKK in Germany. In Germany he was arrested and prosecuted for being a member of the PKK. He was released in 1998.

After the capture of PKK leader Abdullah Öcalan, Özden went to the Qandil Mountains in northeastern Iraq and became a member of the executive council of the Kurdistan Communities Union (Kurdish: Koma Civakên Kurdistan, KCK), a Kurdish political organization incorporating the PKK. He was appointed leader responsible for Sinjar Province, also known as Shingal, part of Sinjar District in the Nineveh Governorate, northwestern Iraq. Özden was sent to replace the former leaders of the province, Vahiyettin Karay, alias Agit Civyan, and Agit Kelar, who were both killed along with 33 others during a meeting in the Qandil Mountains, by a Turkish airstrike. The militant Kurdish organization established bases in the mountainous area of Sinjar, where an armed force of about 2,500 was stationed. Özden moved to Sinjar on 11 July 2011.

== Assassination ==
On 15 August 2018, the Turkish Armed Forces (Turkish: Türk Silahlı Kuvvetleri, TSK), in cooperation with the National Intelligence Organization of Turkey (Turkish: Milli İstihbarat Teşkilatı, MİT) carried out a Turkish Air Force cross-border airstrike into Iraqi territory. The operation was named "Bedirhan Mustafa Karakaya" after a ten-month-old baby boy, who was killed along with his mother by an improvised explosive device of the PKK in their private car. The boy and his mother had been returning from their visit to the boy's father, who was serving as a gendarmerie sergeant stationed at Yüksekova, Hakkari, southeastern Turkey on 31 July 2018. The MİT was able to listen to Özden's satellite phone and was thus able to localize his whereabouts. His activity was observed for three days.

A Turkish intelligence unit reported that Özden had arrived in Kocho village at around 12:00 hours local time on 15 August 2018. He was to attend a memorial service for the victims of the Sinjar massacre, which was perpetrated by the Islamic State of Iraq and the Levant (ISIL) on the resident Yazidis in early August 2014. He remained in the area for about three and half hours. The airstrike did not begin during this time due to Özden's proximity to a large number of civilians. He left the meeting place at around 15:30 in an armored vehicle in a convoy of four cars, which was observed by air and land for approximately 20 minutes. The airstrikes were carried out as part of a series of Turkish cross-border military operations with the alleged permission of the Iraqi government.

== Legacy ==
Ismail Özden is viewed by many Yazidis as a hero of the resistance of the Yazidis against ISIS. In Turkey Özden was viewed as a terrorist and he became the first person to be wanted on the Turkish government's red list. The monetary reward for him amounted to ₺ 4 million (more than $1 million USD). A ceremony was held to mourn his death in Celle, Germany.

== See also ==
- List of assassinations of the Kurdish-Turkish conflict
