= Leyla Söylemez =

Turkish lawyer, militant and activist (1989–2013)

- Born: 1 January 1989; Mersin, Turkey
- Died: 10 January 2013 (aged 24); Paris, France
- Cause of death: Assassination
- Occupations: Lawyer, militant, activist

Leyla Söylemez (1 January 1989 – 10 January 2013) was a Kurdish lawyer, militant and activist. She was an area manager of the PKK youth organisation. Her nom de guerre was Ronahî. In Turkey, Leyla Şöylemez had an arrest warrant issued against her on charges of "membership of a terrorist organization".

== Background ==
She fled to Germany in the 1990s together with her family and lived in Halle, where she studied architecture. But she did not graduate, in order to become more involved in politics.

== Assassination ==
Söylemez, along with Sakine Cansız and Fidan Doğan were assassinated in Paris on 10 January 2013. She was shot in the head with a silenced weapon at the Kurdish Information Centre in Paris. Within a week of the assassination, Ömer Güney was detained by the French police. After questioning him they suspected him of being involved in the murder and put him in pretrial detention. By January 21, he was the main suspect as television closed circuit images showed he was at the premises the day of the murder. In December 2016, a month before the trial would have begun, Güney died from a tumor in a hospital in Paris.

== See also ==
- List of unsolved murders (2000–present)
