= Sinam Mohamed =

Syrian diplomat and politician

Sinam Sherkany Mohamad

Representative of the Syrian Democratic Council in the United States
- Incumbent
- Assumed office 2018 Serving with Bassam Said Ishak, Bassam Saker

President of the People’s Council of Rojava
- Incumbent
- Assumed office 2011

Personal details
- Party: Syrian Democratic Council
- Occupation: Diplomat, Politician
- Known for: Leading diplomat of the Autonomous Administration of North and East Syria

Sinam Sherkany Mohamad is the Syrian Democratic Council (SDC) representative in the United States. She is one of the leading diplomats from the Autonomous Administration of North and East Syria (AANES) in Syria and is a member of the SDC Presidential Council.

== Career ==
Mohamed was the founding President of the People’s Council of Rojava in 2011, and previously served as AANES’ diplomatic representative in Europe.

In 2018, Mohamed wrote for the Defense Post, arguing that the US and its allies should support the Syrian Democratic Forces in Afrin, where they were defending against Turkish forces and their allied militias. In 2020, Washington Diplomat reported that "For nearly three years, Sinam Sherkany Mohamad has worked the corridors of power in Washington to drum up American support for the Syrian Democratic Forces (SDF), which she represents as the U.S. envoy for the Syrian Democratic Council, part of the group’s political wing."

Mohamed serves alongside Bassam Said Ishak, "a Syriac Christian human rights leader", and Dr. Bassam Saker, on the SDC mission in the US.

In December 2024, Mohamed said that there had been no direct contact with the new Syrian government, but described its statements about the Kurdish minority as "positive".
