= Özgür Gündem =

Turkish newspaper

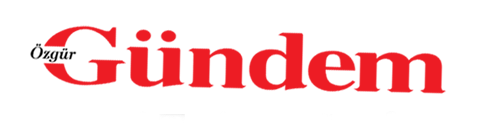
- Type: Daily
- Founder: Ragip Duran
- Editor-in-chief: Ocak Isik Yurtçu, Gurbetelli Ersöz, Zana Kaya
- Founded: 1992
- Ceased publication: 1994; 2016
- Relaunched: 2011
- Political alignment: Left-wing
- Language: Turkish
- Circulation: up to 60,000
- Sister newspapers: Özgür Ülke, Yeni Politika, Özgürlükçü Demokrasi

Özgür Gündem (Turkish for "Free Agenda") was an Istanbul-based daily Turkish language newspaper, mainly read by Kurds. Launched in May 1992, the newspaper was known for its extensive reporting on the Kurdish-Turkish conflict, and was regularly accused of making propaganda for the Kurdistan Workers' Party (PKK). Its editors and staff have frequently been arrested and prosecuted, which resulted in multiple publication bans. Since April 1994, the publication continued under different names until Özgür Gündem was relaunched in 2011.

A month after the 2016 Turkish coup d'état attempt, the newspaper was "temporarily" shut down following a court order, and some twenty journalists and editors were taken into custody, including novelist and Özgür Gündem columnist Aslı Erdoğan, editor in-chief Zana Kaya, and newsroom editor İnan Kızılkaya, facing charges of "membership of a terrorist organisation" and "undermining national unity." The closed newspaper was quickly succeeded by the digital newspaper Özgürlükçü Demokrasi ("Libertarian Democracy") (which features a daily column, "Aslı's Friends"), but its website is blocked in Turkey.

== Background ==
Before Özgür Gündem, there had been some (mainly weekly) publications that aimed at propagating the rights of the Kurds in Turkey. They include:

- Toplumsal Diriliş (Social Revival), started publishing on 15 June 1988 only for a short time, because many editions were confiscated
- Halk Gerçeği (People's Reality), was published between 22 April 1990 and 24 June 1990
- Yeni Halk Gerçeği (New People's Reality), appeared between 26 August and 16 September 1990, closed by decision of the publishers
- Yeni Ülke (New Land), beginning of publication: 20 October 1990; of its 110 editions, 40 were confiscated.

Yeni Ülke was quite successful and reached about 50,000 readers, which caused the PKK to encourage the foundation of a daily newspaper, Özgür Gündem.

== History ==
=== 1992–1994 ===
Under the leadership of the journalist Ragıp Duran, Özgür Gündem (Free Agenda) began publication on 30 May 1992 and reached a circulation of up to 60,000. Due to financial restraints it stopped publication between 15 January and 26 April 1993. Subsequently, Gurbetelli Ersöz became the editor in-chief, but her tenure was short-lived as she and about 90 people were detained during a search of the headquarters in Istanbul on the 10 December 1993. 18 staff members including Ersöz were arrested.

From the beginning the paper was particularly known for its extensive coverage of the ongoing conflict between the Turkish Armed Forces and the Kurdistan Workers' Party (PKK), a Kurdish guerrilla army, which was being downplayed by mainstream Turkish media. Another editor-in-chief was the Turkish journalist Ocak Işık Yurtçu. During Yurtçu's tenure as editor, the paper's circulation grew to more than 100,000, a record for an independent Turkish paper.

The work was also dangerous, however, and in 1992 alone, four journalists from Özgür Gündem were assassinated by unknown attackers. According to The Committee to Protect Journalists, the paper's staff were also subject to "a concerted campaign of arrests, bans and trials" by the Turkish government, forcing the paper's temporary closure in April 1994. On 10 December 1993 the offices of the paper in Istanbul were raided and more than 90 people were detained. Between 9 and 11 December 1993 the offices in Diyarbakır, İzmir, Adana, Mersin and other places were raided, too, resulting in more detentions. When a ban on publishing issued by the State Security Court in Istanbul on 18 November 1993 had become legally binding the paper had to close down on 14 April 1994. Before, on the 23 December 1993, the spokesperson of the Turkish government Yildirim Aktuna assured the Committee to Protect Journalists (CPJ) that since Özgür Gündem was still publishing, it was a sign that press freedom existed in Turkey. Of the 580 editions 486 had been confiscated. Ten editors-in-chief stayed in pre-trial detention for periods of two to six months. Ocak Işık Yurtçu held the position of an editor-in-chief of Özgür Gündem for eight months. For the articles that were published during this time he was indicted 26 times under Articles 6, 7, and 8 of the Anti-Terror Law and Article 159 and 312 of the Turkish Penal Code. When the first sentences passed on him had been confirmed by the Court of Cassation Yurtçu was arrested in Istanbul on 28 December 1994. The sentences against Ocak Işık Yurtçu amounted to 20 years' imprisonment. The sentences of former editor-in-chief Şeyh Davut Karadağ totalled 38 years' imprisonmentand he decided to go abroad. Its publisher Yaşar Kaya, who was also chair of political party DEP received a 4 years sentence accused of separatism the 18 February 1994 due to a speech he held at a KDP congress in Erbil on 15 August 1993. He was released on bail, and fled to Europe. In 1996, Yurtçu and Özgür Gündem were awarded the International Press Freedom Award of the Committee to Protect Journalists, "an annual recognition of courageous journalism". On 14 August 1997, the Turkish parliament unanimously passed a limited amnesty for Yurtçu and several other jailed editors. Yurtçu was released from Saray Prison the following day.

=== Follow-ups to Özgür Gündem (1994–2011) ===
There are a number of successors to Özgür Gündem or rather the paper often changed its name for being able to continue the publication, since courts kept to issue bans on publishing the dailies or weeklies that followed the same line as Özgür Gündem. The names and dates (begin and end) of appearance of successors to Özgür Gündem are:

Name (tr)	Name (en)	begin	end
Özgür Ülke	Free Land	28 April 1994	2 February 1995
Yeni Politika	New Politics	13 April 1995	16 August 1995
Demokrasi	Democracy	12 December 1996	3 May 1997
Ülkede Gündem	Agenda in the Country	7 July 1997	23 October 1998
Özgür Bakış	Free View	18 April 1999	24 April 2000
2000'de Yeni Gündem	New Agenda in 2000	27 April 2000	31 May 2001
Yedinci Gündem	Seventh Agenda	23 June 2001	30 August 2002
Yeniden Özgür Gündem	New Free Agendy	2 September 2003	28 February 2004
Ülkede Özgür Gündem	Free Agenda in the Country	1 March 2004	16 November 2006
Toplumsal Demokrasi	Social Democracy	16 November 2006	5 January 2007

There were a number of further names of newspapers that appeared between 2001 and 2007 such as

- Gerçek Demokrasi (Real Democracy)
- Güncel (Current)
- YedinciGün (7th Day), it started on 5 November 2007

==== Özgür Ülke ====
On 3 December 1994 3 bombs hit Özgür Ülke's printing facilities, and its offices in Istanbul and Ankara. One member of staff was killed and 23 injured.

=== Development since 2011 ===
Özgur Gündem resumed publishing after 17 years on 4 April 2011. On 23 December 2011, nine Özgür Gündem staff members were arrested in a raid on the office by the Istanbul police, who accused the nine of links to the PKK. Thirty-one journalists were detained at other newspapers on the same days. Reporters Without Borders criticized the arrests, stating that it was "very concerned" that the Turkish government was attempting to "criminalize journalism, including politically committed journalism". As of March 2012, the nine remained imprisoned.

On 24 March 2012, the 14th High Criminal Court of Istanbul decided for a publication ban of one month under the allegations of "propaganda for an illegal organization". Bianet, (Independent News Agency), also reported that "the punishment is based on news, comments and photographs on pages 1, 8, 9, 10 and 11 of the Saturday issue. The court also decided to confiscate the complete issues of 24 and 25 March."

Editor Huseyin Aykol alleged that the newspaper had since April 2011 faced "such a huge number of arrests and such intense pressure". The Committee to Protect Journalists stated that it was "outraged" at the ban, describing it as part of a pattern of "trumped-up charges to silence press outlets that cover sensitive issues". Responding to this and other criticisms, Justice Minister Sadullah Ergin stated that a pending government-backed judicial reform package would, among numerous other provisions, prevent such bans in the future.

The Ministry of Justice, in a statement on 27 March 2012, announced that the closing-down of press and media organizations will be rendered impossible following the adoption of the "package for the speeding up the judicial services," which was submitted to the Turkish Grand National Assembly in January 2012. The ban was lifted on 30 March 2012.

At least seven editors and writers associated with the pro-Kurdish daily Özgür Gündem (The Free Agenda) were among 27 journalists still being held in August 2012 after being arrested in a massive government sweep on 20 and 21 December 2011. Authorities said the roundup was related to their investigation into the banned Union of Communities in Kurdistan, or KCK, of which the banned Kurdistan Workers Party (PKK) is part. In most cases, the journalists faced up to 15 years in prison upon conviction. The hearing of 12 September 2012 was adjourned to 12 November 2012.

On the 3 May 2016, several prominent journalists initiated a solidarity campaign with the newspaper and each one assumed for a day the post of a so-called Editor-in-Chief on Watch for Özgür Gündem. The campaign lasted until 7 August 2016. Some of the campaigns participants were Sebahat Tuncel, Nurcan Baysal, Erol Önderoğlu and Murat Çelikkan.

On 16 August 2016 the 8th Magistrates Court of Istanbul ordered a "temporary shutdown" of the Özgür Gündem publication on grounds of publishing "terror propaganda" allegedly supporting the PKK. No duration for the closure was specified in the court order. The closure was followed up with police raids during which several of the paper's staff were taken into custody. Novelist and Özgür Gündem columnist Aslı Erdoğan, editor in-chief Zana Kaya and newsroom editor İnan Kızılkaya remained imprisoned, facing charges of "membership of a terrorist organisation" and "undermining national unity." Journalist Necmiye Alpay was also charged. The paper was quickly succeeded by Özgürlükçü Demokrasi ("Libertarian democracy"), which saw its first issue on 23 August 2016 and features a daily column "Aslı's Friends". The newspaper was definitely closed on 30 October 2016.

Against 50 of the Editors in Chief on Watch investigations into terror related charges were initiated. Against 12 journalists the investigations were dismissed but the others had a trial was launched. Murat Çelikkan was sentenced to 1 year and 6 months imprisonment in 2017, others where condemned to fines. On the 3 April 2019, 7 editors in chief on watch were sentenced to 1 year and 3 months, but only Celalettin Can had to enter prison as the other verdicts execution were suspended.

== Judgments of the European Court of Human Rights ==
The European Court of Human Rights (ECtHR) has repeatedly passed judgments on convictions and bans around Özgür Gündem and its successors and articles published there. See List of ECHR cases concerning Article 10 in Turkey. In addition, in Kiliç v. Turkey (2000) it held Turkey responsible for breaching Article 2 by failing to protect the life of Özgür Gündem correspondent Kemal Kılıç, and for failing to hold a proper investigation into his assassination on 18 February 1993.

== See also ==
- Censorship in Turkey
- Human rights in Turkey
