= Yeni Ülke =

Former pro-Kurdish newspaper in Turkey

- Type: newspaper
- Founded: 20 October 1990
- Ceased publication: 1993
- Language: Turkish
- Headquarters: Istanbul, Turkey

Yeni Ülke (New Land) was a Turkish pro-Kurdish newspaper. It was founded in October 1990 as a weekly newspaper, and in 1993 merged with the daily Özgür Gündem. The establishment of the newspaper was primarily motivated by the Kurdistan Workers' Party (PKK), and PKK members contributed several columns and articles. It quickly gained popularity and reportedly reached a readership of 50,000.

In 1992/3 a number of its contributors (included Musa Anter, assassinated September 1992) were assassinated.

On 24 February 1992 Yeni Ülke journalist Cengiz Altun was assassinated. He had previously received death threats, and had written an article on the Counterguerrilla in the 2–8 February issue. Yeni Ülke's Mecit Akgün was found hanged to an electric pole on 2 June, by PKK according to a note left on the scene. Journalist Yahya Orhan, who wrote for Özgür Gündem and Yeni Ülke, was assassinated on 31 July 1992. Kemal Kılıç, a former correspondent for Özgür Gündem then writing for Yeni Ülke, was assassinated on 18 February 1993. Some of these assassinations were later mentioned in the 1998 Prime Ministry report into the Susurluk scandal, in a censored section later leaked to the press.

In 1999 the European Court of Human Rights overturned a conviction under Article 312 relating to a July 1991 article published in Yeni Ülke.

== See also ==
- List of journalists killed in Turkey#Journalists and vendors killed in the Kurdish conflict
