= Kurdistan National Congress =

International non-governmental organization

- Founded: July 1999; 26 years ago Amsterdam, Netherlands
- Type: Political organization
- Headquarters: Brussels, Belgium
- Location: Global
- Fields: Solution to the Kurdish question, Work on the national and international level for the promotion of the right to self-determination of the people of Kurdistan, lobbying
- Members: More than 300 members and Thousands supporters
- Co-Chairs: Mrs. Zeyneb Morad Mr. Ahmet Karamûs
- Website: knk-kurdistan.com

The Kurdistan National Congress (Kurmanji Kurdish: Kongreya Neteweyî ya Kurdistanê, KNK; Sorani Kurdish: کۆنگرەی نەتەوەییی کوردستان) is a coalition of political parties and civil society organizations from Kurdistan and the Kurdish diaspora. Its main task is the promotion of national unity among the people of Kurdistan and the representation of their interests on an international level. The KNK is headquartered in Brussels. It has local offices in Hewlêr (Erbil, Iraqi Kurdistan) and Qamişlo (Rojava, Syrian Kurdistan).

== History ==
It was officially founded in Amsterdam on May 24, 1999. It was inaugurated on 24 May 1999 in Brussels. The group has more recently be referred to as the Kurdistan National Congress in the Diaspora.

An institution preceding the KNK, the Kurdistan Parliament in Exile (Parlamana Kurdistane Li Derveyi Welat – PKDW) based in Brussels, had by then achieved its objectives. The Kurdish public agreed on the need for a much larger Kurdish representation in the form of a congress. Consequently, the Kurdistan Parliament in Exile dissolved on September 26, 1999

The convention of the KNK was endorsed on 26 May 1999, at the organization's founding assembly, and the scholar Ismet Cheriff Vanly was declared the first president. The convention was amended most recently at the ninth assembly which took place in December 2008.

Recently, conferences held by the group have reaffirmed their wish that Kurds may have their national identity recognized and the territory of Kurdistan be respected.

== Structure ==
Currently, 361 individuals, many of them representing organizations from Kurdistan and the Kurdish diaspora, are officially listed as members of the KNK. In total, the KNK comprises more than 70 political parties and civil society organizations from all four parts of Kurdistan and the diaspora. The Executive Council is the highest body of the KNK. Its members are elected by the KNK General Meeting for a two-year-term. The executive council is led by the two KNK co-Chairs. Currently, Mrs. Zeyneb Morad and Mr. Ahmet Karamûs are the KNK co-chairs. They were elected during the 21st General Meeting in December 2022. Hêvî Mustefa and Faruq Cemil are the KNK vice co-chairs. Four commissions (women, foreign relations, language, education, culture and the arts and environmental issues) and six committees (media, human rights, finance, beliefs, Feyli Kurds, Rojhilat) are tasked with the work of the KNK.

== Political Goals ==
In its convention, the KNK states with regards to its goals: “The Kurds have the right to decide on the form of their national self-determination. This may take the form of autonomy, federalism, confederalism or independence. In the fight to achieve such objectives the Kurdish nation asserts its right to implement all forms of defense. Nevertheless, the Kurdish nation rejects the use of terror in the struggle for freedom, equality, justice and fairness and abides by all international human rights declarations.” The KNK convention also mentions principal rights of the peoples of Kurdistan, the right to self-determination and general principles, objectives and the strategic position of the congress. These include the acknowledgment of the need to protect the ethnic and religious diversity of Kurdistan, to promote gender equality, to refrain from cooperating with occupying forces in Kurdistan and to solve all problems among Kurdish groups or with neighboring countries peacefully.
