= Istanbul 10 =

Group of human rights activists

Nalan Erkem, Seyhmuz Ozbekli, Ozlem Dalkiran, Idil Eser, Veli Acu, Gunal Kursun, Ilknur Ustun, Nejat Tastan, Ali Gharavi and Peter Steudtner were to be called the "Istanbul 10", after their arrest on 5 July 2017. They had gathered in the island Büyükada outside Istanbul for a workshop about protection of digital information. The arrest of these human rights defenders attracted international media attention and led to several diplomatic negotiations.

The "Istanbul 10" were released on bail on 25 October 2017, after 113 days in detention. Amnesty International's Chair in Turkey, Taner Kılıç, was only released on 16 August 2018.

== The Büyükada arrests ==
On 5 July 2017, ten human rights activists were arrested on the island Büyükada outside Istanbul. The arrested persons were from different human rights organisations. Eight of the arrested people were Turkish citizens, one was German and another one was Swedish-Iranian. Amnesty International's Turkish chairman, Taner Kılıç, was arrested already on 6 June, but was included in the prosecution with the others. The foreign citizens held a workshop for the Turkish activists about protection of digital information. On the third day of the workshop approximately 20 men wearing guns entered and arrested the activists.

== The arrested ==
The "Istanbul 10" refers to the group of human rights activists arrested during a workshop on the island of Büyükada, off the coast of Istanbul, where the activists were holding a digital security workshop. The activists were coming from different European countries as well as Turkey. A list of the arrested is below:

- İdil Eser, the Director of Amnesty Turkey (also, member of Citizens' Assembly)
- İlknur Üstün, Women's Coalition
- Günal Kurşun, Human Rights Agenda Association
- Nalan Erkem, Citizens’ Assembly
- Özlem Dalkıran, Citizens’ Assembly
- Veli Acu, Human Rights Agenda Association
- Şeyhmus Özbekli, lawyer
- Nejat Taştan, Association for Monitoring Equal Rights
- Ali Gharavi, digital strategy and wellbeing consultant, writer
- Peter Steudtner, trainer for non-violence, digital strategy and well-being consultant

Additionally, Amnesty International's Chair in Turkey, Taner Kılıç, was linked to the Büyükada case despite not being physically present on the Island.

The arrests happened in the framework of the purge that the Turkish government enforced following the attempted coup of July 15, 2016.

== Detention ==
Ali Gharavi and Peter Steudtner were moved between several prisons, one of the prisons they were detained in was Silivri Prison, but they were not allowed to meet. Silivri prison is one of Turkeys most guarded prisons with thousands of political prisoners.

== The trial ==
After 12 days without charges, the ten human rights defenders were interviewed by public prosecutors in the Judicial Palace in Istanbul on 17 July 2017. The same day the public prosecutor ordered the detention of all ten human rights defenders. The judge ordered a pre-trial detention for six of them on 18 July. All ten were charged for aiding an armed terrorist organisation. Ozlem Dalkiran, Idil Eser, Veli Acu, Gunal Kursun, Ali Gharavi and Peter Steudtner were kept in detention while Nalan Erkem, Seyhmuz Ozbekli, Ilknur Ustun and Nejat Tastan were released but put under other judicial restrictions. Upon appeal of the public prosecutor, Nalan Erkem and Ilknur Ustun were remanded into custody again on July 24.

== International reaction to the arrests in the press and politics ==
The arrests of the ten activists sparked reactions in the countries of provenience of the activists as well as worldwide, both in the press and the political arena.

=== Turkey ===
- On 6 July, the pro-government newspaper Sabah published an article regarding the detention and included the section "Reminds of the July 15 Meeting":

"17 people, who are majorly foreign, arrived in a hotel in Büyükada on July 15 (coup attempt) and held a two-day meeting. American Professor Henri Barkey, who works for CIA, was also there."

- On 7 July, two days after the detention, Amnesty International released a video on Twitter, with the text "In 1998 we campaigned for release of a prisoner of conscience Erdogan. Now we're asking him to release our staff".
- On 8 July, three days after the detention, Turkish President Recep Tayyip Erdogan attended a press conference following 2017 G20 Hamburg summit. As a response to a reporter's question regarding the above-mentioned video, Erdogan stated the following:

"What was the result of those human rights defenders’ statements about me? As a result, I went to jail. I stayed there for four months and ten days. I was the mayor of Istanbul at the time. What did I do? I read only one poem. Now, those people you mentioned, why did they gather in Büyükada? Unfortunately, they gathered for a meeting, which was simply a continuation of July 15. As a result of an intelligence report, police organization raided and detained them. I do not know what will happen since they are detained, there may be a judiciary procedure. I have no authorization on this incident; the police organization will do the necessary actions. The judiciary will also take a proper decision."

As a response to the reporter's question of freedom of speech in Turkey and detained activists, Erdogan stated the following:

"(...) Who are those activists? Do you mean ByLock users? Do you mean the people who carry weapons to terrorist organizations? Besides, do you mean the ones who give all the kinds of support to the terrorist organizations? Who are those activists? Take the news from the right source, then come and ask me."

- On 11 July, İHD chair Öztürk Türkdoğan stated in a joint press conference:

"It is impossible for us to accept news articles defaming and criminalizing them despite official statements that the investigations are still ongoing. Issues that have not even been told to lawyers and suspects, and those not included in the investigation files, are published as though they were real."

- On 21 July, after six of the defenders were arrested, Gunes published an article titled "July 24 attempt plan". On the article, the meeting in Büyükada is projected as a part of coup attempt against Turkish government, with the alliance of the opposing political parties HDP and CHP, along with some "terrorist organizations" such as FETÖ and PKK, big corporations and media outlets.

Ali Gharavi was projected as a Swedish spy with Iranian origin, who marked Southeastern Turkey on a partition map and prepared encrypted information. According to this information, they were using back-up phones without name lists, they preferred disposable versions and the memory cleaner applications with timer settings.

According to the article, the detained people in Büyükada were not alone. Several intellectuals were members of a WhatsApp group called "24th of July, Together We Are Free". Some of the mentioned 70 members were journalist Ahmet Şık’s wife Yonca Şık, European Parliament member Joost Lagendijk’s wife Nevin Lagendijk, journalists Banu Güven, Barış Pehlivan and Mustafa Hoş, employees of the newspapers Hürriyet and Evrensel, former chair of CHP youth branch Barbaros Dinçer and one of the founders of HDP, Sezai Temelli.

Journalist Mustafa Hoş created a flood on Twitter that the WhatsApp group was formed in order to gather in solidarity for the lawsuit of Cumhuriyet newspaper, and that he will "continue to tell the truth."

Barış Pehlivan also responded to allegations in an article which appeared on OdaTV, stating that "Gunes’s editor in chief Turgay Güler was a prominent Gulen supporter."

Prominent newspapers and news outlets reacted to this article. Lawyers of Evrensel filed a criminal complaint against Gunes. T24 projected Gunes as "not a newspaper, but a provocation center". Cumhuriyet also published an article regarding the issue, stating that it is an accusation with no grounds. An article also appeared on Diken, stating that Gunes newspaper is owned by Ethem Sancak, who is known by his ‘declaration of love’ to Erdogan.

=== Sweden ===
The Swedish government published a public statement two weeks after the arrests. The Swedish minister of foreign affairs, Margot Wallström, stated that it was the government's understanding that Ali Gharavi was in Turkey to attend a seminar about internet freedom and human rights. The government had asked Turkey to share the accusations towards Ali Gharavi as soon as possible. The governments also stated that they were taking the imprisonment of Ali Gharavi and the other activists that were arrested on 5 July seriously.

The Swedish government were working actively with the case together with Germany. They tried to raise the issue of the imprisonment of the two European citizens that was arrested on 5 July with the EU, and they continued to inform Turkey about the Swedish standpoint towards the development in Turkey, especially in regards of human rights and respect for rule of law. The government also called for the release of Ali Gharavi, if Turkey failed to share the accusations towards him.

The arrest of Ali Gharavi received a lot of media attention in Sweden. The Swedish Radio interviewed the spokesperson for Amnesty International in Sweden, Ami Hedenborg. She said that the allegations towards the detained human rights activists were completely unfounded. At the same time she mentioned that tens of thousands of people are detained in Turkey, and many for arbitrary reasons without formal allegations. The local newspaper in the south of Sweden, Sydsvenskan, wrote about the reactions from Ali Gharavi's wife, Laressa Dickey, two weeks after the arrest. She said that Ali needed to be let free as soon as possible, and that the prosecution against him had to be withdrawn. She also said that he had worked with human rights for almost 20 years, and that she was shocked to hear that he was accused of terrorism. The public news channel, SVT, interviewed Amnesty International on the day Ali Gharavi was released on bail. The Secretary General in Sweden, Anna Lindenfors, said that the case is exceptional in Turkey, and that this was the first time that human rights defenders were directly attacked.

=== Germany ===
The arrests sparked a spate of reactions in Germany as one of the "Istanbul 10", Peter Steudneter, a German citizen.

Right after the arrests, on July 5, German Green Party MP and Bundestag Vice President, Claudia Roth published a post on her Facebook page, condemning the arrests as an evidence of the failure of the rule of law and democracy in Turkey and as a sheer provocation by Turkish President Recep Tayyip Erdogan towards Angela Merkel as they were both engaged in a G20 Summit in Hamburg during the days following the arrests.

On July 7, another institutional reaction had come from the parliamentary group of the SPD published a statement calling for the release of the activists. From the statement we can read: "News like this shows that every day Turkey continues to move away from the rule of law and human rights. Where those who fight for human rights and freedom of the press are themselves so massively targeted, there can be no question of a resilient democracy."

On July 10, the Bundestag released an official statement calling for the release of Taner Kiliç and Idil Eser, respectively the chairman of the board and the director of the Turkish section of Amnesty International. The statement was made by the chairman of the Committee for Human Rights and Humanitarian Aid of the German Bundestag, Prof. Dr. med. Matthias Zimmer and it appealed the Turkish Ambassador to Germany to encourage the Turkish government to release the two. The statement acknowledges the activists arrested on 5 July but does not further comment on their release. In the days following the arrests, SPD chancellor candidate Martin Schulz released a statement to Der Spiegel saying: "What we are experiencing in Turkey is crossing all borders, President Erdogan is in the process of eradicating democracy and the rule of law in Turkey, removing his country further and further away from Europe."

On July 18, the German publication Der Taggesspiegel reported a statement by German Chancellor Angela Merkel calling for the release of Peter Steudtner and his colleagues. "We are firmly convinced that this arrest is absolutely unjustified [...] We declare our solidarity with him and the other arrested [...] And we will do everything on the part of the Federal Government, at all levels, to obtain his release," Merkel reportedly said.

The institutional reaction of condemnation was largely reflected into the German press. Some salient examples are reported below.

The German daily Frankfurter Rundschau collected the institutional reactions and reconstructed the post-arrest dynamics, with the arrested left unaccounted for and their location not clear. The piece also reports concerns from the UN High Commissioner for Human Rights, Liz ThrosselAftermath of the arrests and current situation about possible risks of torture and ill-treatment of the arrested. The piece also reports the arrested will be held in prison for at least seven days, before a court decision that could prolong or end their detention. A week later, on July 7, Zeit Online published a follow-up piece as the decision on the activists' detention loomed with the likely outcome of extended custody. The piece also insisted on the fate of the two figureheads of Amnesty International Turkey, Taner Kiliç and Idil Eser and the similar fate that 100,000 people held captive in Turkey had encountered since the attempted coup of 15 July 2016.

On July 18, Spiegel Online published a piece focusing, among other aspect of the story, on the confirmed detention of Peter Steudneter, the only German national attending the workshop on Büyükada. Steudneter's case is listed alongside the one of Deniz Yücel and Mesale Tolu, two other German citizens who were arrested in Turkey, as further evidence of the deteriorating relationship between Germany and Turkey. As time went by, the German media focused on the story of Peter Steudneter and the absurdity of the terrorism allegations. Steudneter's partner, Magdalena Freudenschuss, was quoted in a Bild article saying: "Peter has always worked for a peaceful, non-violent solution to conflicts. The suggestion that he could have planned a coup is completely absurd."

== Following actions, demonstrations and campaigns ==
=== Appeals, demonstrations and letters ===
Since the arrests, a number of initiatives have been launched to pressure the Turkish government to release the activists.

On October 12, 2017, a number of celebrities such as Zoë Kravitz, Nazanin Boniadi, Don Cheadle, Marisa Tomei, Adam McKay, Paul Haggis, Joshua Malina, Fisher Stevens, Claire Danes, Ben Stiller, Whoopi Goldberg, Mike Farrell, Eva Orner, Peter Sarsgaard, Tim Roth, Kathy Najimy, Mark Ruffalo, Zach Galifianakis, Bruce Cohen, Shira Piven, Mike White, Tim Kring, and James McAvoy co-signed a letter calling on the Turkish government to release the "Istanbul 10"

In December 2017, 40 members of the US Congress signed a joint letter urging US President Donald Trump to call on Turkey to release Taner Kılıç.

The arrests of the "Istanbul 10" have sparked worldwide condemnation and reactions. Demonstrations were held in Belgium, Chile, Germany, Ireland, Hong Kong, Mali, the Netherlands, Paraguay, Portugal, Sweden, Switzerland, Venezuela and Slovakia.

== Release on bail and Taner Kılıç's case ==
The "Istanbul 10" were released on bail on October 25, 2017, after almost three months in jail.

However, Amnesty International's Chair in Turkey, Taner Kılıç, currently remains behind bars. A court decision sanctioned the prolonging of his pre-trial detention in connection with a separate case.

A month before the Büyükada events, Kılıç was in fact indicted in another, juridically separate case. Although Kılıç was formally released from charges related to the Büyükada workshop, he is still to be tried for a separate case involving him and other 22 lawyers who were arrested in Izmir, on suspicion of having links to exiled preacher Fetullah Gülen's organisation allegedly responsible for the attempted coup of 15 July 2016.

Kılıç was charged with "membership of a terrorist organisation." One of the evidences used by the Turkish prosecutors would the presence of the messaging application ByLock on Kılıç's phone, allegedly used by the Gülen movement. A court decision ordered his release on January 31, 2018. A new court hearing is set to take place on June 21, following an appeal filed by the prosecutor. If convicted, Kılıç could face up to 15 years in jail.
