= Mustafa Kabakçıoglu =

Mustafa Kabakçıoğlu
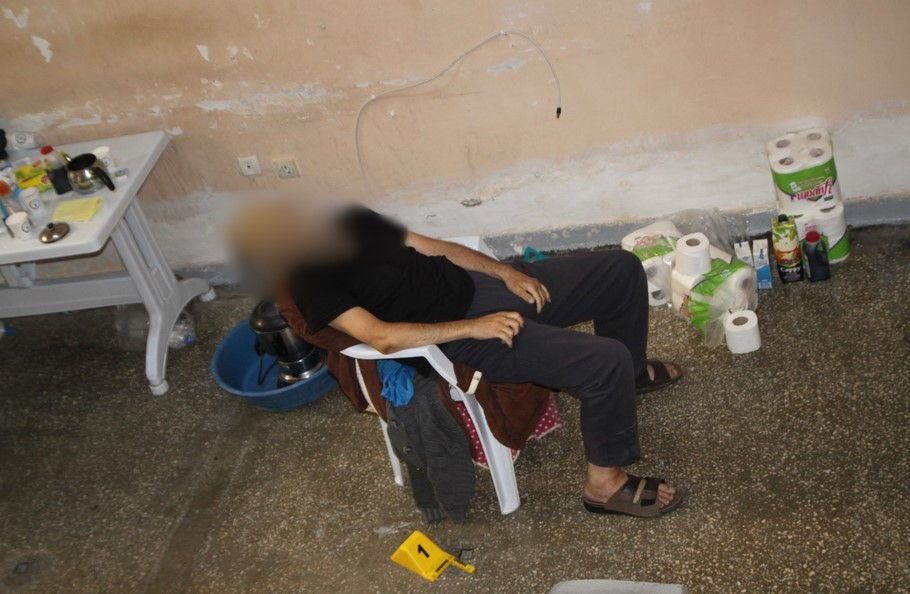
- Mustafa Kabakçıoğlu
- Born: 1976; Turkey
- Died: 29 August 2020 (aged 43–44); Gümüşhane E Type Prison, Gümüşhane, Turkey
- Occupations: Police officer, Deputy Commissioner

Mustafa Kabakçıoğlu (1976 – 29 August 2020) was a Turkish police officer and deputy commissioner. He served in the Turkish National Police and was dismissed from public service following the government decrees issued after the 2016 Turkish coup attempt. He died while imprisoned at Gümüşhane E Type Prison in 2020. His death received public attention due to allegations concerning prison conditions and access to medical care.

== Career ==
Kabakçıoğlu worked as a police officer within the Turkish National Police. During his career, he served in Istanbul and at the Intelligence Branch Directorate in Artvin. He later worked in Şebinkarahisar, Giresun Province. According to the Tenkil Memorial database, he received several commendations and regained his rank of deputy commissioner following a legal process in 2015.

== Arrest and conviction ==
Kabakçıoğlu was arrested on 26 July 2016 after the failed coup attempt in Turkey. He was dismissed from the police force through a government decree issued on 1 September 2016.

He was later convicted and sentenced to seven years and six months in prison. Sources critical of the government's post-2016 crackdown stated that the case included evidence related to a donation to Kimse Yok Mu, witness statements, and alleged use of ByLock.

== Death in custody ==
Kabakçıoğlu died on 29 August 2020 at Gümüşhane E Type Prison. He was found unresponsive in a quarantine cell, sitting on a plastic chair, according to reports published after his death.

Before his death, Kabakçıoğlu reportedly suffered from several health problems. A letter he wrote to the prison doctor shortly before his death mentioned swelling, difficulty speaking and walking, numbness in his arm, and problems affecting movement below the waist.

The Gümüşhane Chief Public Prosecutor's Office stated that emergency medical services had been called on 20 and 24 August 2020 and that Kabakçıoğlu had refused a proposed hospital transfer on 27 August. Relatives of Kabakçıoğlu and some human rights advocates disputed this account and argued that his medical condition was not adequately addressed.

== Cause of death and legal proceedings ==
A forensic report cited by TR724 stated that the cause of death was respiratory failure caused by a lung infection. The report also stated that a COVID-19 test was negative.

Following public discussion of his death, the Ministry of Justice appointed two inspectors to examine the circumstances surrounding the case.

A criminal complaint filed by his family resulted in a non-prosecution decision in 2021, according to reports on the case.

== Reactions ==
The circumstances of Kabakçıoğlu's death were discussed by Turkish opposition figures and human rights organizations. Broken Chalk called for an investigation into the case and raised concerns about prison conditions and treatment of detainees in Turkey.

The Tenkil Memorial database includes Kabakçıoğlu's case among its records documenting alleged human rights violations following the 2016 purges in Turkey.

== See also ==
- 2016 Turkish purges
- 2016 Turkish coup attempt
- Human rights in Turkey
- Prisons in Turkey
