= Abdullah Tırpan =

- Died: 26 October 2026; Istanbul, Turkey
- Citizenship: Turkish
- Occupations: Butcher, meat producer
- Known for: Imprisonment following the 2016 Turkish coup attempt
- Children: 5

Abdullah Tırpan (died 26 October 2026) was a Turkish tradesman who worked as a butcher and meat producer in Tekirdağ. He was involved in commercial activities for approximately 55 years. Following the 2016 coup attempt in Turkey, he was prosecuted over alleged links to the Gülen movement and sentenced to seven years and six months in prison on charges of membership in an armed terrorist organisation. He experienced various health problems while in prison and died at a hospital in Istanbul on 26 October 2026, aged 73.

== Life ==
Tırpan worked as a butcher and meat producer in Tekirdağ for approximately 55 years. He ran his own business, producing köfte (Turkish meatballs) and sucuk (Turkish sausage). Local sources reported that he was also known for his charitable activities and had appeared on tax ranking lists in several years. He was the father of five children.

== Trial and imprisonment ==
Abdullah Tırpan was arrested on 16 August 2016 as part of the investigations launched following the failed coup attempt in Turkey on 15 July 2016. He was tried on charges of membership in an armed terrorist organization over alleged links to the Gülen movement and sentenced to seven years and six months in prison. During the trial, authorities considered several factors, including his having an account at Bank Asya, donations he had made to various associations, and his children's attendance at certain schools.

In February 2025, Tırpan was returned to prison and transferred to Metris Type R Prison.

== Health problems ==
While in prison, Tırpan suffered from chronic health conditions, including diabetes, high blood pressure and nerve damage. His health gradually deteriorated. A report prepared by the 11th Specialization Board of the Council of Forensic Medicine in 2025 reportedly concluded that there was no medical reason preventing him from remaining in prison. In 2026, the medical board at Tekirdağ City Hospital was also reported to have reached a similar conclusion.

In February 2026, Tırpan began experiencing difficulty speaking, and a brain MRI was requested. The scan, performed on 8 June 2026, reportedly revealed severe narrowing of blood vessels in the brain and a high risk of stroke. In July of the same year, he underwent surgery in hospital for wounds on his feet caused by diabetes.

As his condition worsened, his family and several members of parliament called for a postponement of his sentence. On 8 October 2026, MP Mustafa Yeneroğlu visited Tırpan at Metris Prison and drew public attention to the seriousness of his condition, citing gangrene and open wounds on his left leg.

== Death ==
As his health deteriorated, Tırpan was admitted to Başakşehir Çam and Sakura City Hospital on 20 October 2026. On 22 October, his left leg was amputated below the knee. Following the operation, he was placed in intensive care and put on a ventilator.

Abdullah Tırpan died in hospital on 26 October 2026, aged 73. Following his death, members of his family and several politicians criticised the assessments of his health and the conditions in which he had been held in prison, calling for an investigation into the circumstances of his death.

He was buried on 27 October 2026 at the Old City Cemetery in Süleymanpaşa, Tekirdağ, following a funeral prayer at Rüstem Pasha Mosque.
