= Womontown =

Former lesbian neighborhood in Kansas City

Womontown was a 20th-century neighborhood in Kansas City, formed by a community of lesbians who actively created a space where they could "walk hand in hand, freely down the streets." The spelling of the neighborhood was an expression of their dream to live without any reference to men.

The community began when Andrea Nedelsky and Mary Ann Hopper (then dating, though eventually married) bought a low-priced home in Kansas City's Longfellow neighborhood in the 1990s, and decided to create the reality they dreamed of. Tired of swimming against the hetero-misogynistic current that dominated their lives, Womontown was created in response to frustrations with homophobic discrimination, particularly housing discrimination, and harassment in public. At its peak, the community had 80 people from racially diverse backgrounds and extended 12 blocks in the area. They held events together, such as potlucks and porch gatherings.

The neighborhood peaked in the 1980s and 1990s with the aim of self-sufficiency. However, after several years, the labor required to keep the community running became overwhelming. Despite their efforts to carve out a space for themselves, the group leader still "had full-time jobs. This was a full-time second job,” Documentarian Sandy Woodson says of group leaders.

== History ==
Womontown was founded by Andrea Nedelsky and her then-girlfriend Mary Ann Hopper (the two later married), who bought a house in Kansas City's Longfellow neighborhood. Frustrated with homophobic harassment and discrimination, particularly around housing, Nedelsky and Mary Ann hoped to create a self-sufficient community where they could live without discrimination. According to Hopper, "We just started imagining, what if we could just walk hand in hand freely down the street, a bunch of lesbians all in this neighborhood?"

After buying their home, Nedelsky and Hopper published an ad in a national lesbian magazine to attract other lesbians to the community. The advert described Womontown as an "International Urban Womyn's Community". As more women moved to the neighborhood, the community would assist in helping them to move in, and they would receive a flag known as the "Dutch Hill flag" which had previously been used to represent the nearby Dutch Hill neighborhood. The flag was purple and featured three tulips, and was meant to signify the house was safe and part of the community. At the peak of Womontown, 80 members of the community inhabited 12 blocks of the Longfellow neighborhood. The group renovated 28 houses and 14 apartment buildings in the area.

== Legacy ==
In 2024, the Gay and Lesbian Archives of Mid-America commemorated the community with a bronze plaque in the Longfellow neighborhood. The plaque features the Dutch Hill flag imagery of three tulips, and a history of the neighborhood.
