= Reorganization operations in Turkey =

Reorganization operations in Turkey refers to judicial operations conducted against members of the Gülen movement, based on allegations that they are engaged in efforts to reorganize.

== History and background ==
After the failed 2016 coup attempt in Turkey, The Turkish government has declared the Gülen movement a terrorist organization. Since then, large numbers of individuals have faced charges for alleged membership in, or assistance to, a terrorist organization. Between 2023 and 2025, the intensity of operations targeting the Gülen movement further increased, accompanied by political statements affirming that the campaign would continue without slowing down.

== Content and scope of the operations ==
The operations involve individuals accused of having connections to the Gülen movement. They also include the families of those imprisoned, people recently released from prison, and members of their social circles who provide them with support.

Under the scope of the reorganization operations, the following activities have been treated as acts of terrorism:

- Opening and using an account at Bank Asya,
- Using the ByLock communication application,
- Working in educational institutions considered to be affiliated with the Gülen movement or sending children to such institutions,
- Membership in legal unions, foundations, or associations,
- Maintaining relationships with the families of detained or convicted individuals and providing them with financial support,
- Engaging in daily humanitarian activities, including social, sports, and religious events.

== Current situation and operations ==
The Minister of Internal Affairs of the Republic of Turkey, Ali Yerlikaya, announced a series of operations named “Kıskaç” on social media. The term “Kıskaç operations” was first used in October 2023 to describe large-scale, simultaneous operations conducted across numerous provinces and officially announced by the Turkish Ministry of the Interior (Turkey).

According to the Ministry of the Interior, between 2023 and 2025 a total of 11,667 operations were carried out against members of the Gülen movement. During this period, 19,025 individuals were taken into custody and processed, 3,512 were formally detained, and judicial control measures were imposed on 4,041 people.

Some of these operations include; On December 28, 2023, 445 police officers were suspended, and judicial proceeding have been initiated against them. On September 14, 2024, during the "Kıskaç-27" operation, 34 people were taken into custody in simultaneous raids across 17 provinces.

On May 7, 2024, during an operation in the Beylikdüzü district of Istanbul, a case was filed against 41 middle school, high school, and university students.This operation received wide attention nationally and internationally and became known as the "Girls' Trial”.

On July 18, 2025, during operations targeting the Hakmar and Tatbak retail chains, 26 suspects—including the store owner and several police officers—were taken into custody, and 22 individuals were subsequently arrested. As part of the investigation, trustees were appointed to manage the Hakmar and Tatbak stores.

== Reports of international human rights organizations ==
The reorganization operations against the Gülen movement in Turkey have been closely monitored and reported in detail by international human rights organizations. These reports evaluate the compliance of the operations with human rights standards. Difficulties faced in asylum applications by individuals considered to be associated with the Gülen movement, as well as the potential consequences if they are forcibly returned to Turkey, have been documented. It has also been noted that Gülenists living abroad as asylum seekers continue to be regarded as a high-risk group.( DFAT country information reports)
