= Lambda Istanbul =

LGBT organization in Turkey

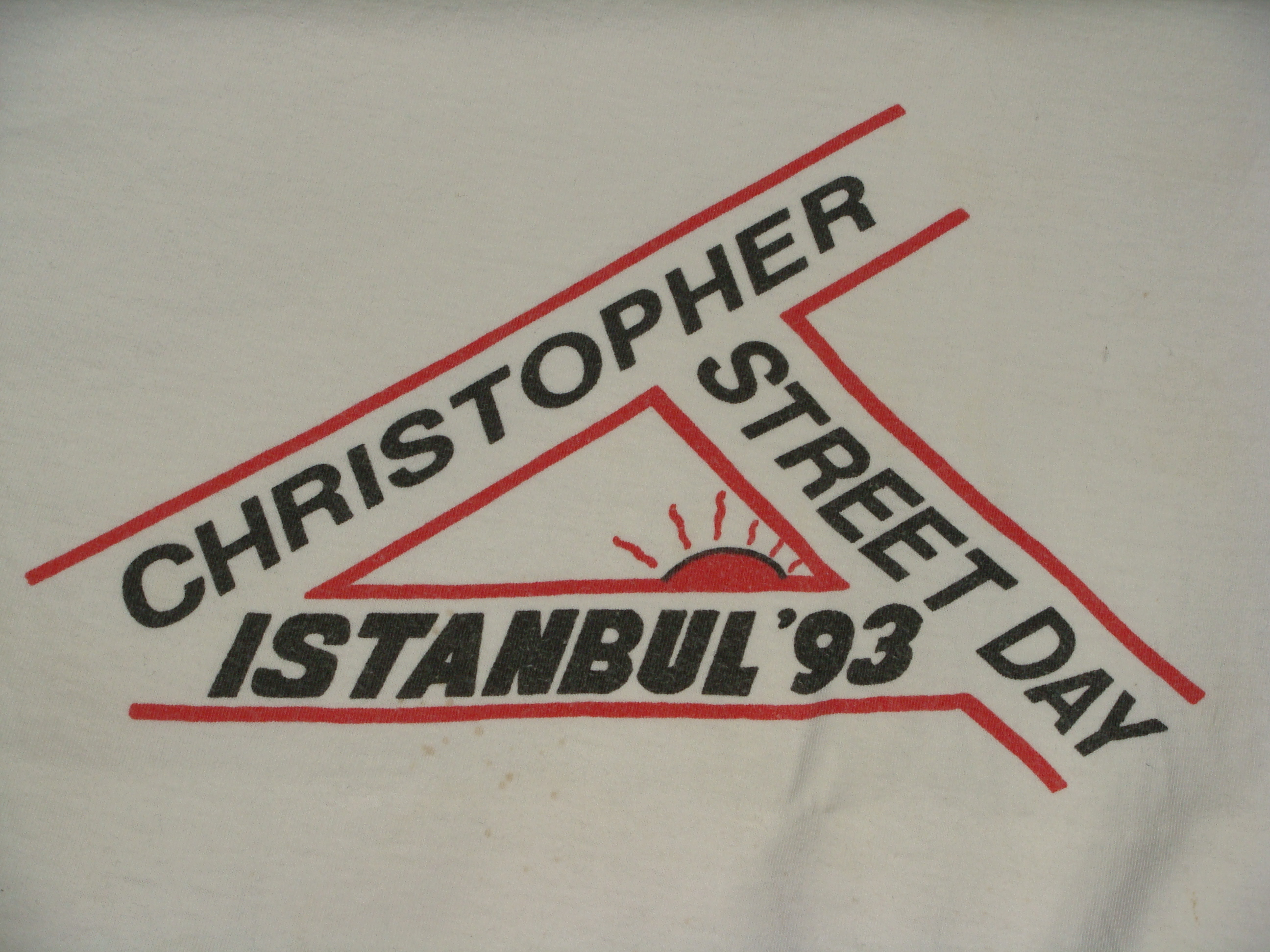
- Original T-shirt designed for the first Christopher Street Day celebration march in 1993
- Website: lambdaistanbul.org

Lambda Istanbul is a Turkish LGBT organization. It was founded in 1993 as a cultural space for the LGBT community, and became an official organization in 2006. The association is organized by volunteers without a hierarchy. Clandestine Pride events were held in Turkey starting in 1993, and with Lambda Istanbul participation, they became public marches.

== Activities ==
The agenda of Lambda includes:

- Reporting human rights violations.
- Helping change the 10th article of the Constitution, pending its amendment. According to the Article No.10 of the Constitution of Turkey, discrimination based on language, race, skin color, gender, political opinion, religion, denomination and similar reasons is prohibited but it does not directly refer to sexual orientation or sexual identity.

== History ==
The organization was ordered dissolved in May 2008 following a court decision. The prosecutors claimed that Lambda Istanbul's objectives were "against the law and morality". The order has been criticized by Human Rights Watch and Amnesty International. The Supreme Court of Appeals overturned this order on November 25, 2008, and on April 30, 2009, a lower court granted Lambda Istanbul permission to continue operating.

== See also ==
- LGBT rights in Turkey
