= Housing discrimination =

Discrimination affecting a person's ability to buy or rent housing

Housing discrimination refers to patterns of discrimination that affect a person's ability to rent or buy housing. This disparate treatment of a person on the housing market can be based on group characteristics or on the place where a person lives.

The most straightforward form of housing discrimination involves a landlord who rejects offers from potential tenants based on factors such as race, age, gender, marital status, source of funding, and others. The landlord may perform the discrimination explicitly or implicitly. Housing discrimination can also occur among existing tenants, who may face detrimental treatment in comparison to others for the same reasons. Housing discrimination can lead to spatial inequality and racial segregation, which, in turn, can exacerbate wealth disparities between certain groups.

== Types ==
Sociologists Vincent J. Roscigno, Diana L. Karafin, and Griff Tester have determined that the variety of actions that constitute housing discrimination can be classified as either exclusionary or nonexclusionary.

=== Exclusionary ===
Exclusionary discrimination practices refer to practices that seek to prevent certain individuals or families from obtaining housing, based on factors of discrimination. This includes explicit refusals (which may also include harassment and verbal abuse), proactive requests for or against specific minorities in advertising, as well as implicit tactics such as like lying about standards for rental qualification to disqualify certain individuals, unfair financing or loan qualifications or terms, steering or restricting the choices of people seeking homes, and refusing to provide insurance, which would prevent the individual or family from acquiring a home. Consumer advocate groups conducted studies and found that many minority borrowers who were eligible for affordable, traditional loans were often steered toward incredibly high-priced subprime loans that they would never be able to repay.

The majority of discriminatory actors in exclusionary discrimination are landlords and landowners, as they have the positional power and direct access to the individual or family and the housing being sought. Other discriminatory actors or institutions responsible for exclusion include real estate, insurance, and banking and lending agents and institutions.

=== Nonexclusionary ===
Nonexclusionary discrimination practices refer to "actions and practices that occur within an already established housing arrangement, most often entailing racial harassment, differential treatment of tenants, or disparate application of contractual terms and conditions of residency." Individuals and families already housed experience ongoing intimidation, differential treatment, and harassment, and nonexclusionary discrimination often results in distress for victims since the victim is often legally bound to the home and usually has direct contact with the perpetrator on a regular basis. Landlords and owners are still responsible for the majority of this type of housing discrimination, but neighbors and banking and lending institutions participate more. For instance, even without institutionalized exclusionary power, residential neighbors can harass and intimidate tenants.

Most nonexclusionary discrimination cases involve applying discriminatory terms and conditions within the victim's current residential setting. The majority of these cases involve terms, conditions, and privileges relating to a current rental arrangement. These cases are often seen as unfairly raising the rent of a select group or allowing certain tenants privileges, like using a facility after hours or being lenient on pet policies. Many nonexclusionary discrimination cases involve the failure to provide equal access to services and facilities, such as purposely delaying or completely forgoing fixing a broken pipe. More terms and conditions cases involve discriminatory financing, loans, and appraisals of the individual or family's property, which is when the discriminatory actor takes advantage of the victim financially.

Other forms of nonexclusionary discrimination include the use of harassment, intimidation, and coercion toward victims. This includes racial slurs and threats of violence, both of which create an uneasy environment in which the victims live. These forms can cause excessive anxiety and stress for the individual or family affected. If an individual holding a position of an authority, such as the landlord, is responsible for the nonexclusionary discrimination, the victim is left with a feeling of powerlessness and lack of ability to get help.

== Gender discrimination ==
In many countries, structural discrimination in housing disadvantages men and favors women. This is typically studied by correspondence studies, where fictitious applications are sent to landlords and real-estate agents. The experimenter can then manipulate the name of the applicant to change gender or ethnicity while keeping everything else identical. In 2018, a meta-analysis of 25 correspondence studies in 15 OECD countries (totalizing over 110,000 letters) found that women are 30% more likely than men to be chosen, everything else being equal. There is an interaction between sexism and racism, so that sexist discrimination in stronger against men of ethnic minorities. However, men from the dominant majority also suffer from discrimination compared to women.

Consistently, men make up the vast majority of homeless people and a 2019 French study found that 90% of homeless people who die in the street are men.

== By country ==
=== Canada ===
In Ontario, housing discrimination is addressed under the Ontario Human Rights Code.

=== United States ===
In the United States, the Office of Fair Housing and Equal Opportunity is charged with enforcing fair housing laws, based on the Fair Housing Act of 1968.

A study conducted by the U.S. Department of Housing and Urban Development (HUD) found that "the greatest share of discrimination for Hispanic and African American home seekers can still be attributed to being told units are unavailable when they are available to non-Hispanic whites and being shown and told about less units than a comparable non-minority."

=== Turkey ===
In Turkey, the Human Rights and Equality Institution is charged with enforcing fair housing laws, based on the law of the same name as the institution, which published in April 2016.

== See also ==
- Right to housing
- Ownership equity
- Real estate economics
- Redlining
- Subprime
- Subsidized housing
- Racial steering, real estate agents guiding prospective buyers to or from neighbourhoods based on their race
