= Öztürk Türkdoğan =

Turkish lawyer and activist

Öztürk Türkdoğan (born 10 November 1969 in Kars, Turkey) is a lawyer and Human Rights activist and politician. He was the head of the Turkish Human Rights Association (IHD), a member of the Wise People committee for the peace process in 2013 and for the parliamentary elections of May 2023, he has become a candidate to the Grand National Assembly of Turkey for the Green Left Party (YSP).

== Early life and education ==
Öztürk Türkdogan was born in a village in Selim of Kars where he attended primary school later transferring to Erzurum where he completed primary school and began attending high school. He moved a gain to Izmir, where he completed high school in Bergama. After his graduation from the Health Vocational School in Yenisehir, he began working as a health officer in 1988. The same year he began to study law at the Ankara University from where he graduated in 1994.

== Professional life ==
Öztürk Türkdogan quit as a health officer in 1998, and following worked as a lawyer. Since the same year he is a legal advisor to the Social Service Worker's Union (SES). Between 2002 and 2009 he served as legal adviser to the Confederation of Public Employees' Unions (KESK) of which he was a founding board member. In 2002, he became a member of the Central Board of the IHD, and became its chairman in 2008. Türkdogan resigned from the leadership of the IHD in March 2023, after he decided to run as a candidate to the Turkish parliament. Eren Keskin became his successor.

=== Legal prosecution ===
He was arrested on the 19 March 2021 due to an investigation concerning eventual activities of the prohibited Kurdistan Workers' Party (PKK). The same day he was released pending trial. The month before, the interior minister accused the IHD of being linked to the PKK. Soylu deemed he statements regarding the deaths of Turkish soldiers in a Turkish military operation by the IHD, the PKK and HDP as similar. By the prosecution, he was accused of being part of an illegal organization. The investigation concerned statements regarding the detention conditions of Abullah Öcalan, which were published on the website of the news agency ANF. Since, January 2022, he was also investigated over the publication of a petition that called for the recognition of the Armenian Genocide on the IHD website In April 2022, he was acquitted from being part of an illegal organization, but the other trials kept ongoing.

== Personal life ==
He is married and has two children.
