= Mustafa Yeneroğlu =

Turkish politician

Member of the Grand National Assembly of Turkey
- Incumbent
- Assumed office 7 June 2015
- Constituency: Istanbul (III)

President of the Human Rights and Equality Institution of Turkey
- In office 25 January 2022 – 17 November 2023
- Preceded by: Süleyman Arslan
- Succeeded by: Position vacant

Personal details
- Party: Justice and Development Party (until 2019); Democracy and Progress Party (2020–2024)
- Occupation: Politician, academic, lawyer

Mustafa Yeneroğlu is a Turkish politician, academic, and lawyer who served as a Member of Parliament in the Grand National Assembly of Turkey.

== Early life and career ==
In 1976, he settled in Cologne, Germany, with his family. He graduated from the Faculty of Law at the University of Cologne. Since 1987, he has been actively involved in civil society activities abroad. He served as a member of the advisory board for Overseas Citizens under the Presidency for Turks Abroad and Related Communities (YTB) and was the founding president of the Association for the Fight Against Discrimination and Racism. He managed the magazines Perspektif and Sabah Ülkesi and served as the Secretary General of the IGMG. Between 2015 and 2017, he chaired the Board of Directors of the Migration Research Foundation (GAV).

== Political career ==
Yeneroğlu was elected as an Istanbul deputy for the Justice and Development Party (AKP) in the June 2015, November 2015, and 2018 general elections. On August 18, 2018, he was elected as a member of the AKP's Central Decision and management board (MKYK). Between 2017 and 2018, he served as a member of the Constitutional Committee of the Grand National Assembly of Turkey and the Turkish delegation to the Parliamentary Assembly of the Council of Europe (PACE).

On October 28, 2019, he resigned from his position in the MKYK, followed by his resignation from the Justice and Development Party on October 30, 2019, citing disagreements over the party's direction regarding human rights and the rule of law. On March 9, 2020, he became one of the founding members of the Democracy and Progress Party (DEVA), established under the leadership of Ali Babacan.

He has served as an Istanbul MP across the 25th, 26th, 27th, and 28th legislative terms of the Turkish Parliament. On December 26, 2024, Yeneroğlu announced his resignation from the Democracy and Progress Party and currently continues his mandate as an independent deputy.
