= Nimet Tanrıkulu =

Turkish human rights activist

Nimet Tanrıkulu is a Kurdish-Turkish human rights activist. A founding member of the Human Rights Association, as well as a member of the Saturday Mothers, Tanrıkulu was detained and tortured during the 1980 coup d'état, following which she focused on human rights activism, ultimately obtaining a master's degree in human rights law from Istanbul Bilgi University. In recognition for her human rights work, Tanrıkulu was awarded the Carl von Ossietzky Medal in 1996 and the Sevinç Özgüner Human Rights, Peace and Democracy Award in 2005. Having been detained on at least 35 occasions throughout her life, in December 2024 Tanrıkulu was arrested for being a member of a terrorist organisation on charges Amnesty International described as "baseless".

== Early life ==
Tanrıkulu was born in Feriköy, Şişli, Istanbul, to Kurdish parents originally from the village of Çobanyıldızı in the Pülümür District of Dersim (now Tunceli) Province. As a young child, Tanrıkulu returned with her parents to Dersim, but significant poverty led to the family returning to Istanbul, where Tanrıkulu completed her education. She went on to obtain a master's degree in human rights law from Bilgi University, where her dissertation focused on women and peace. Tanrıkulu later worked in business administration, but threats linked to her activism led to her leaving her job.

== Activism ==
Tanrıkulu was a high school student and preparing for university when the 1980 coup d'état occurred. Tanrıkulu was detained and interrogated by officers from the political branch of Istanbul Police Department in Gayrettepe. During her detention, Tanrıkulu was tortured; her teeth were smashed, her shoulder dislocated, and her hair was pulled out. She was also given electric shocks and beaten. Tanrıkulu was subsequently placed in Metris Prison in Esenler, and was released from custody following her first court hearing. As a result of her torture, Tanrıkulu experienced lifelong tinnitus as well as limited functioning of her left arm.

In 1986, Tanrıkulu served as one of the founding members of the Human Rights Association, a non-governmental organisation that focused on advancing human rights in Turkey. Tanrıkulu worked for the organisation for over 25 years, and went on to become the president of its Istanbul branch and a member of its board of directors.

Tanrıkulu was also a member of the Saturday Mothers, which was originally founded to raise awareness of forced disappearances and political murders during the military junta between 1980 and 1983 via a campaign of civil disobedience, primarily through silent sit-ins at Galatasaray in Beyoğlu, Istanbul starting in 1995. Tanrıkulu was arrested frequently as part of her work with Saturday Mothers, estimating this happened at least 35 times. The group was inspired by the Mothers of Plaza de Mayo in Argentina, and Tanrıkulu was part of a delegation of Saturday Mothers who met with their Argentine counterparts during a nine day visit to Turkey in 1998. As part of her work with the Saturday Mothers, Tanrıkulu was awarded the 1996 Carl von Ossietzky Award.

In 2005, in recognition of her human rights activism, the Istanbul Medical Chamber named Tanrıkulu as the recipient of that year's Sevinç Özgüner Human Rights, Peace and Democracy Award.

== Arrests and trials ==
In 2012, Tanrıkulu was investigated by the Diyarbakır Chief Prosecutor's Office for allegedly being a member of the Democratic Society Congress, a pro-Kurdish non-governmental organisation. The investigation ended with no further action being taken, with alleged audio recordings of Tanrıkulu being dismissed after it was established that Tanrıkulu did not speak Kurdish.

In 2018, Tanrıkulu was investigated for a second time following allegations that she was sympathetic to Kurdish causes. In 2023, the Diyarbakır High Criminal Court suspended the planned trial due to the absence of grounds for prosecution.

In 2021, Tanrıkulu was detained alongside 16 other women following the Feminist Night March in Taksim Square, Istanbul, after allegedly chanting insults about Recep Tayyip Erdoğan, the President of Turkey.

On 26 November 2024, Tanrıkulu was among 14 people detained following a mass operation across several Turkish cities targeting politicians, trade unionists and human rights activists. Tanrıkulu's home was raided and she was taken to Ataköy Police Station in Bakırköy, Istanbul, where she was remanded before being transferred into the custody of the Ankara Anti-Terror Department on 28 November. On 30 November, the Ankara 4th Criminal Judgeship of Peace granted an arrest order in respect of Tanrıkulu on suspicion of being a member of a terrorist organisation under article 314/2 of Turkey's criminal code. Following the hearing, she was transferred to Sincan Women's Prison in Ankara.

Amnesty International launched a petition in support of Tanrıkulu, describing the charges against her as "baseless" and describing her as being arbitrarily detained, calling for her immediate release. They stated that a transcription of Tanrıkulu's interview included questions about her support of the Kurdish rights movement during the 2013-2014 peace process and historic travel made at that time, none of which it felt could be considered as confirming her involvement in a terrorist group.

The Human Rights Association's co-chair Eren Keskin said that Tanrıkulu had been arrested with fabricated evidence. Hanife Yildiz from Saturday Mothers said that Tanrıkulu had always been on the side of justice and called for her immediate release.
