= Taner Kılıç =

Turkish civil rights activist (born 1969)

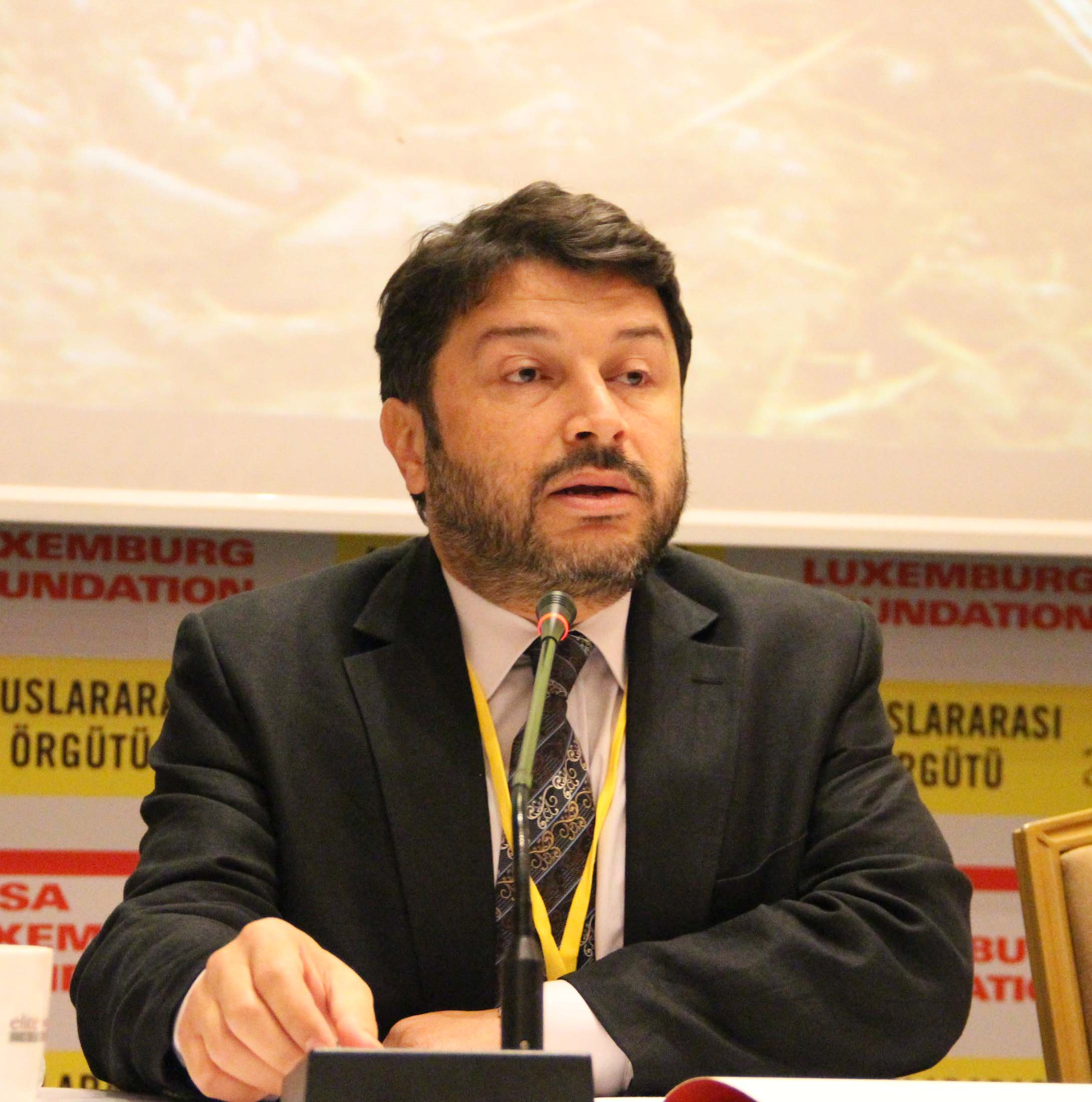
- Born: 1969 (age 56–57)
- Education: Dokuz Eylül University
- Known for: founding of Amnesty International Turkey; arrested 6 June 2017
- Title: President of Amnesty International Turkey
- Term: 2014–
- Successor: Incumbent

Taner Kılıç (born 1969) is a Turkish civil rights activist. He is one of the founding members of the Turkey section of the human rights organisation Amnesty International and its president since 2014. Kılıç was detained by Turkish authorities for alleged terrorist activities on 6 June 2017, during the 2016–17 purges in Turkey.

He remained in detention until 15 August 2018. On 3 July 2020, he was sentenced to six years in prison. Amnesty condemned the verdict as a "travesty of justice".

== Education and career ==
Kılıç studied at Dokuz Eylül University, graduating from its law school in 1991, and practised as a lawyer since 1993. He cofounded the Association for Solidarity with Refugees (Mültecilerle Dayanışma Derneği) and was the head of its board from 2008 to 2014. As of May 2016, he was a member of the Immigration and Asylum Commission of the İzmir Bar Association and of the Refugee Rights Study Group of the Turkish Bars Association.

=== Amnesty International ===
Kılıç is one of the founding members of Amnesty International Turkey, of which he became president in 2014.

== Arrest during 2016–17 purges ==
Kılıç was detained by Turkish authorities on 6 June 2017 and charged with use of the smartphone program ByLock and membership of a terrorist organisation. One of Turkey's supreme courts declared in September 2017 that having ByLock installed on the phone of an accused person was sufficient to establish that person's membership of the Gülen movement. Amnesty denied Kılıç downloaded ByLock and said the only evidence presented for this claim was that according to the prosecutor the app was on his phone in August 2014. almost three years before his arrest. Twenty two other lawyers were detained together with Kılıç. These detentions took place during the second year of the 2016–17 purges in Turkey, during which 40,000 public employees were arrested and 120,000 were dismissed or suspended from their jobs. On 26 October 2017, Amnesty International Turkey's director, İdil Eser, was released from prison in Turkey, while an İzmir court ordered that Kılıç remain in detention.

The Los Angeles Times commented that the Turkish president Erdoğan, in power since 2014, had earlier been supported by Amnesty International when he was imprisoned for a poem he wrote in 1998.

On 31 January 2018, an Istanbul court ordered that Kılıç be conditionally released. The prosecutor in the case appealed, and on 1 February, the court accepted the appeal, ordering that Kılıç remain in detention for the full length of his trial.

Non-profit organization positions
Preceded by	President of Amnesty International Turkey; 2014–present	Succeeded by Incumbent
