= Eren Keskin =

Kurdish lawyer and human rights activist

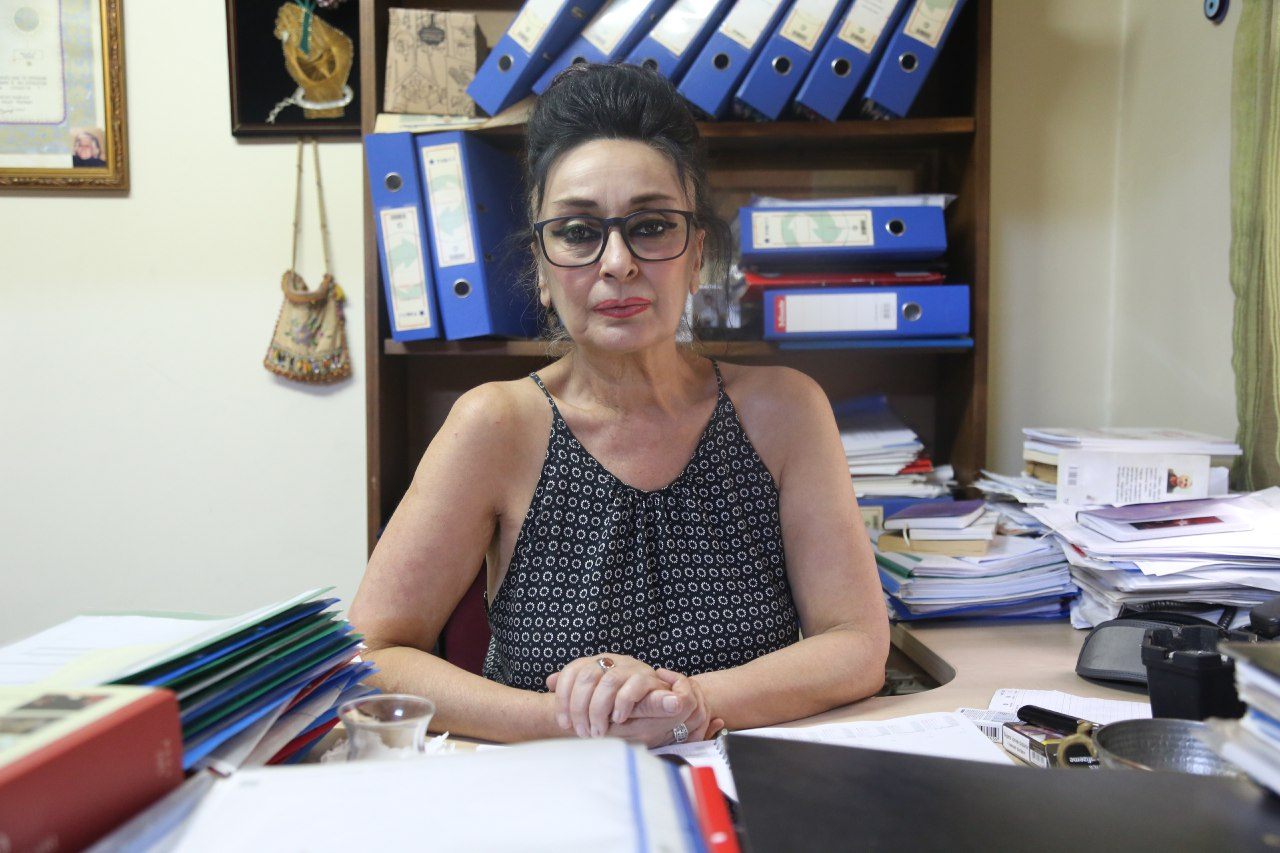
Eren Keskin

Eren Keskin (born April 24, 1959 in Bursa, Turkey) is a Kurdish lawyer and human rights activist in Turkey. She is the vice-president of the Turkish Human Rights Association (İHD) and a former president of its Istanbul branch. She co-founded the project "Legal Aid For Women Who Were Raped Or Otherwise Sexually Abused by National Security Forces”, to expose abuses happening to women in Turkish prisons. She has been arrested, imprisoned, and the object of numerous lawsuits in relation to her human rights activities.

In 1995 she was imprisoned for her activities and was adopted as a prisoner of conscience by Amnesty International. In 2002 she was accused by Turkey's State Security of "aiding and abetting" the PKK because of her advocacy for Kurds to use their native language in Turkey. In March 2006 a Turkish court sentenced her to 10 months’ imprisonment for insulting the country's military. The sentence was then converted to a fine of 6000 New Turkish Liras, which Keskin refused to pay. From 2013 to 2016 Keskin was the editor in chief of the newspaper Özgür Gündem has been sentenced to a total of 7 years and 6 months together. In March 2018 she has been sentenced to 5 years and 3 months imprisonment for insulting the president and another 2 years and 3 months for "degrading Turkishness, the Republic, institutions and organs of the state" according to the Article 301 of the Turkish Penal Code.

On 3 December 2021, Evrensel reported Keskin's home was raided by Turkish police.The raid was conducted to summon Keskin to account for a speech she delivered in Turkey’s eastern Tunceli province in 2019.

== Awards ==
In 2004 she received the Aachen Peace Award "for her courageous efforts and activities for human rights." In 2005 she was awarded the Esslingen-based Theodor Haecker Prize for Civic Courage and Political Integrity. In 2018 she received the Helsinki Civil Society Award from the Netherlands Helsinki Committee for her work based on, and contributing to the legacy of the Helsinki Principles. In 2019 Keskin was a finalist of the Martin Ennals Awards, where she was honoured for her exceptional and relentless fight for fundamental freedoms and rights in Turkey. Due to her travel ban, she was not able to attend the award ceremony on the 13 February 2019.
