= Human Rights Association (Turkey) =

Turkish human rights NGO

- İnsan Hakları Derneği
- Abbreviation: İHD
- Formation: July 17, 1986; 40 years ago
- Type: NGO
- Location: Ankara, Turkey
- Website: www.ihd.org.tr

The Human Rights Association (Turkish: İnsan Hakları Derneği, İHD) is an NGO for advancing Human rights in Turkey, founded in 1986 and headquartered in Ankara.

== Establishment ==
The İHD's origins can be traced to the victims of the purges in the aftermath of the military coup of 1980 and was founded on 17 July 1986. The 98 founding members comprised lawyers, journalists, intellectuals, but mainly relatives of political prisoners. The organization works on all kind of human rights, but is mainly focused on abuses in Turkey. After in 1992 the IHD came under scrutiny from the public for not holding the Kurdistan Workers' Party (PKK) accountable for their war crimes, the IHD acknowledged that in the southeast Turkey was raging a war. In 1992, the statute was changed to cover humanitarian aspects as laid out in the Geneva Conventions. The IHD also criticized human rights violations of armed groups like the PKK which lead to criticism both by the PKK as the Turkish Government wanted the PKK to be mentioned as a terrorist organization and not a party in a conflict.

== Structure and campaigns ==
Official figures of the İHD claim 10,000 members, in 29 branches in 81 provinces of Turkey. The 24 board members are elected for terms of two years on the association's general assembly. The headquarters in Ankara as well as many branches (in particular the branches in Istanbul and Diyarbakir) are running commissions according to the need. The commission cover subjects such as the Kurdish question, women, children, prisons and torture.

Some of the large number of campaigns of the İHD were: freedom of expression (2001), general amnesty for prisoners (1999), abolition of the death penalty (abolished in 2002–2004), abolition of the state security courts (1997). In 2004 a project called "Don't remain silent against torture" (İşkenceye Sessiz Kalma) was started.

The İHD has also recognized the Armenian genocide and has called for the Turkish government to end its denial.

== Persecution ==
Since its foundation the İHD has been facing state intervention into its work, but also direct violence of individuals or nationalist groups. İHD website claims 400 court cases against executives of the association; the governors of some provinces ordered the closure of branches 30 times; the chairman of the branch in Diyarbakir that stayed close between 1997 and 2000, Osman Baydemir, had to face 60 investigative or penal cases against him in one year; in 2000 the branch in İzmir had the same number of cases initiated against it; because of speeches in 1995 and 1996 the then president of the İHD, Akın Birdal, was sentenced to 20 months' imprisonment, of which he served 14 months. Its former president Vedat Aydın was prosecuted for having delivered a speech in Kurdish, which at the time was forbidden, at the Annual Meeting of the İHD in October 1990. One of its founding members, Nimet Tanrıkulu, has been arrested over 35 times, and in December 2024 was detained on suspicion of being a member of a terrorist organisation.

Furthermore, the İHD lists 14 members who were killed. On 12 May 1998, Akın Birdal barely survived an assassination attempt, when two assailants fired 13 shots at him in the office of the association. On 25 November 1999 a group of 30 to 35 persons close to the Nationalist Movement Party (MHP) stormed into the office and beat the new President Hüsnü Öndül. Repeatedly Amnesty International issued urgent actions to draw attention and prevent threats against human rights activists of the İHD, e.g. for Eren Keskin, chairman of the branch in Istanbul.

In July 2005 one of the founders, Adalet Ağaoğlu, left the association due to its connection with the PKK which is classified as a terrorist organization in Turkey. She also accused the association of having a Kurdish racist-nationalist attitude and further for not being able of criticizing the PKK.

== Publications ==
- Annual Reports 1990–2006 (Turkish)
- Annual Reports 1990–1996 (English)
- Annual Reports 1997–2003, 2005 (translated)
- Annual Reports of the Treatment Centers (up to 2006 in Turkish)
- Annual Reports of the Treatment Centers (up to 2005 in English)

=== Special Reports (Books) ===
- File on Torture – Deaths in Detention Places or Prisons 12 September 1980 – 1994 (Turkish-English), second edition up to 1985
- The Report on the Health Services and Health Personnel's Problems in the Southeast (English)
- Freedom of Expression and Migration (Turkish)
- HRFT on Trial 1998 (Turkish)
- Manuel on the Effective Investigation and Documentation of Torture and Other Cruel, Inhuman or Degrading Treatment or Punishment – Istanbul Protocol (Turkish-English)
- Torture and Impunity 2005 (Turkish-English)

== Awards ==
Following awards were delivered to the İHD:

- 1989 Prize for Those at the Top by the journal "Nokta"
- 1991 Prize for Those at the Top by the journal "Nokta"
- 1991 Bruno Kreisky Prize for Services to Human Rights
- 1991 Orhan Apaydin Law and Human Rights Prize
- 1995 Partners Award by the Human Rights Law Group

The İHD awards the Ayşe Zarakolu Freedom of Thought prize in honour of Ayşe Nur Zarakolu.

== See also ==
- Human Rights Foundation of Turkey
