= Human Rights and Equality Institution of Turkey =

Human rights watchdog

- Türkiye İnsan Hakları ve Eşitlik Kurumu
- Logo

Agency overview
- Jurisdiction: Ministry of Justice
- Headquarters: Kızılay, Ankara; 39°55′12.6″N 32°51′30.22″E
- Agency executive: Fahrettin Altun , Chairman
- Website: www.tihek.gov.tr

The Human Rights and Equality Institution of Turkey (Turkish: Türkiye İnsan Hakları ve Eşitlik Kurumu, TİHEK) is the Turkish government institution responsible for equality and human rights in Turkey. It is a public legal entity vested with administrative and financial autonomy by the relevant legislation regulating it.

== History ==
The institution was first established under the name Human Rights Institution of Turkey. It was established by the "Turkish Human Rights Institution Law" dating 21 June 2012 and became a national prevention mechanism with the decision of the Council of Ministers in 9 December 2013. The institution was abolished in 2016 and reestablished with the name of Human Rights and Equality Institution of Turkey in 2016.

== Purpose and duties ==
The Human Rights and Equality Institution of Turkey is established in order to:

- protect and develop human rights based on human dignity;
- to ensure the right of people to be treated equally;
- to prevent discrimination in the enjoyment of legally recognized rights and freedoms;
- to effectively combat torture and ill-treatment;
- to fulfill the task of national prevention mechanism in this regard.

The Human Rights and Equality Institution of Turkey has quasi-judicial authorities such as imposing administrative fines between ₺ 2,673,61 and ₺ 40, 179,00 based upon the procedures stipulated by the Law and conducting ex officio investigations regarding human rights violation and prohibition of discrimination.

== Staff ==
The board consists of eleven members, including a chairperson and a deputy chairperson, who will serve for four years. The board members and staff must declare their property and are prohibited from receiving presents from parties with whom they have business service or relationship of interest.

== Application ==
Each and every natural person and legal person who claim to have suffered from violations of non-discrimination can apply to the institution. Applications to the institution can be filed via governorates in provinces and district governorates in provinces. Applications can be delivered by hand, fax, email and other services provided by the Institution. Persons deprived of their liberty or taken under protection can also apply to the Institution. Applications are not charged with a fee.

== Partnerships ==
The Human Rights and Equality Institution of Turkey is collaborating with the relevant units of the United Nations (UN), Organization for Security and Co-operation in Europe (OSCE) and Council of Europe.

As an institution established in compliance with the Paris Principles, the Global Alliance of National Human Rights Institutions and European Network of National Human Rights Institutions are the strategic partners of the Human Rights and Equality Institution of Turkey. In this regard, it attends annual meetings of the aforementioned organizations and takes part in the projects at advisor level and in working group on migrants and asylum seekers. In the official letter sent by the SCA Secretariat on October 10, 2022, it is stated that SCA decided that the HREIT be accredited with B status.
