= Peter Steudtner =

Human rights activist and documentary film maker

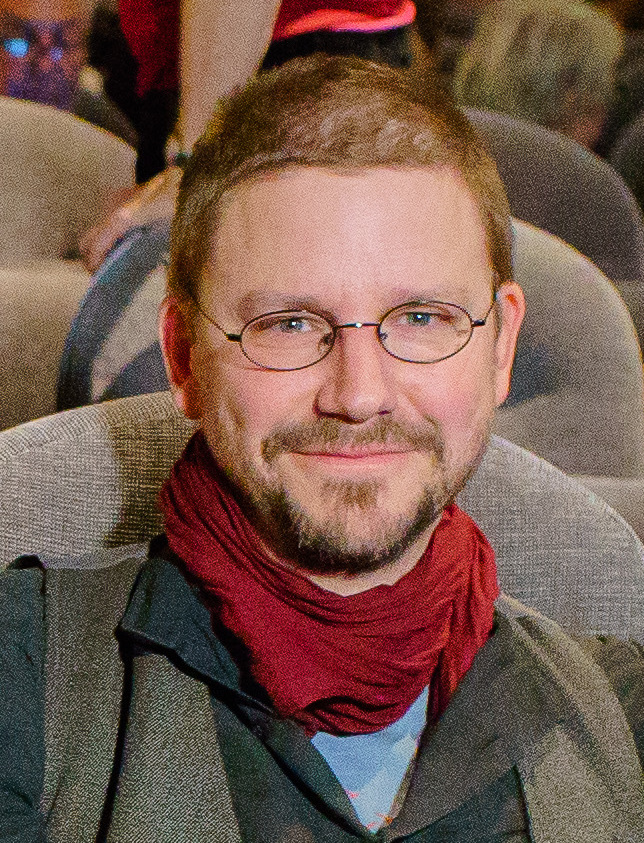
Peter Steudtner, 2018

Peter Steudtner (born 1971 in Berlin) is a German human rights activist and documentary film maker.

On 5 July 2017 Steudtner, along with nine other human right defenders, was arrested by Turkish security forces and charged with supporting armed terrorist organisations. Before his arrest, he was invited by several human rights organization to give a speech at a conference on Büyükada island. He was not permitted to receive mail whilst imprisoned in Turkey.

Among the others arrested and facing charges of membership of terrorist organizations were Idil Eser (the head of Amnesty International Turkey), Ilknur Üstün (of the Women's Coalition), lawyer Günal Kursun and Veli Acu (both of the Human Rights Agenda Association), Özlem Dalkıran (of the Citizens' Assembly).

Prime Minister of the United Kingdom Theresa May raised the question of arrests at a meeting with the Turkish president, Recep Tayyip Erdoğan at the G20 meeting in Hamburg. British Foreign Office minister Alan Duncan expressed his concern about the arrests. He said that the Turkish authorities are urged to "uphold international standards with regard to the rule of law, including the presumption of innocence."

Steudtner and Ali Gharavi were both released on the 3 November 2017, while other human rights activists were sentenced on terror related charges at the same trial.
