= ByLock =

Encrypted messaging application for smartphone

- Release: March and April 2014
- Operating system: Android, iOS, iPad
- Available in: Turkish
- Type: Instant messaging

ByLock was a smartphone application that allowed users to communicate via a private, encrypted connection. It was launched in March 2014 on Google Play, Apple App Store The app was downloaded over 600,000 times from its launch in April 2014 until March 2016, when it was permanently shut down. The Turkish National Intelligence Organization (Turkish: Millî İstihbarat Teşkilatı, MİT) stated that the app was downloaded mainly in Turkey and the users were “Fetullahist Terror Organisation (FETÖ) which was formerly known as “Gülen movement” members.

== Gülen Movement controversy ==
In Turkey, possession of the app is deemed evidence of membership in the Gülen Movement, which was allegedly connected to the failed Turkish coup d'état attempt in July 2016. Users of ByLock were deemed terrorists in Turkish courts. According to Deutsche Welle, of the 215,000 former ByLock users, an estimated 23,000 have been detained by Turkish authorities. Some believe that the MİT and other Turkish authorities manipulated the ByLock database in order to arrest suspected members of the Gülen Movement. Tuncay Beşikçi, a computer forensic expert in Turkey, emphasized that "the demands to investigate and analyze ByLock data from independent institutions are refused by the Turkish courts. But it is not normal". Tuncay Beşikçi believes that this application is precisely one of the channels for Gülen molecules to communicate and can also monitor the activities of other members of the organization. He also stated that the developers behind the Mor Beyin app, deliberately set a plan in motion that would put thousands of innocent people in prison as a cover for the Gülen movement.

In December 2017, Turkish authorities revealed that almost half the people who had been prosecuted for having ByLock on their smartphones would have their legal cases reviewed, as they could have been redirected to the app without their knowledge.
