= List of arrested mayors in Turkey =

The following is an incomplete list of arrested mayors in Turkey.

Arrested Mayors
| Mayor | District | Arrested | Released | Status | Charge | Party | Source |
|---|---|---|---|---|---|---|---|
| Mehdi Zana | Diyarbakır | March 1980 | April 1991 | released | | Independent | |
| Fikri Sönmez | Fatsa | 11 July 1980 | | died in prison on May 4, 1985 | Revolutionary activity, “Communist Fatsa” charge | Independent | |
| Ali Dinçer | Ankara | Sept. 1980 | | released | | CHP | |
== 1999–2009 ==
| Recep Tayyip Erdogan | Istanbul | 27 March 1999 | July 1999 | released after four months | sentenced to 10 months imprisonment for citing a poem | Welfare Party | |
| Feridun Çelik | Diyarbakır | Feb. 2000 | 28 Feb. 2000 | released | For allegedly supporting the Kurdistan Workers Party (PKK). | HADEP | |
| Selim Özalp | Siirt | Feb. 2000 | Feb. 2000 | released | For allegedly supporting the Kurdistan Workers Party (PKK). | HADEP | |
| Feyzullah Karaaslan | Bingöl | Feb. 2000 | Feb. 2000 | released | For allegedly supporting the Kurdistan Workers Party (PKK). | HADEP | |
2009–2014
| Ferit Çelik | Karliova | 5 April 2012 | | sentenced to 8 years | Sentenced for aiding and abetting the PKK | BDP | |
| Abdullah Akengin | Dicle | Dec. 2009 | February 2013 | imprisoned for over 3 years | In relation with the KCK trial | BDP | |
| Abdullah Demirbaş | Sur | Dec. 2009 | May 2010 | released on medical grounds | Among other charges were "using the Kurdish language in his official capacity" | BDP | |
| Aydin Budak | Cizre | 23-24 Dec. 2009 | | sentenced to 7 years and 6 months | | BDP | |
| Zülküf Karatekin | Kayapınar | 23-24 Dec. 2009 | | sentenced to 9 years | for being “member of an organization“ during a trial of members of the Kurdistan Communities Union (KCK) | BDP | |
| Nejdet Atalay | Batman | 23-24 Dec. 2009 | | sentenced to 1 year and 8 months | Sentenced for calling Members of the PKK "warriors of the Kurdish people in mountains" | BDP | |
| Etem Şahin | Suruç | 23-24 Dec. 2009 | | sentenced to 1 year and 9 months | For speaking Kurdish during his election campaign and violated the law concerning marches and manifestations. | BDP | |
| Leyla Güven | Viranşehir | 29 Dec. 2009 | Sep. 2014 | more than 4 years in prison | | BDP | |
| Ferhat Türk | Kiziltepe | 28 De. 2009 | Feb. 2013 | imprisoned for over 3 years | In relation with the KCK trial | BDP | |
| Yusuf Yilmaz | Patnos | 13 Feb. 2010 | | sentenced to 7 years 6 months | For membership in an illegal organization in the KCK-trial | BDP | |
== 2014–2019 ==
| Sevil Rojbin Çetin | Edremit | 14 Aug. 2015 | | sentenced to 10 years | For membership in a terror organization | DBP | |
| Dilek Hatipoğlu | Hakkari | 23 Aug. 2015 | | sentenced to 15 years. In Sincan prison | After having made declarations of self-rule in August 2015, she was sentenced for disrupting the "unity and integrity of the state" | DBP | |
| Seyit Narin | Sur | 24 Aug. 2015 | | sentenced to 11 years and 3 months, arrested in Rize | prosecuted for terror related charges | DBP | |
| Diba Keskin | Erçis | 15 Oct. 2015 | | sentenced to 13 years, 9 months | | DBP | |
| Leyla Îmret | Cizre | 22 Jan. 2016 | | prosecuted, in exile | | DBP | |
| Zeynep Sipçik | Dargeçit | March 2016 | | sentenced to 13.5 years. In Sincan prison | Convicted of membership in a terrorist organization | DBP | |
| Hazal Aras | Diyadin | 3 March 2016 | June 2017 | prosecuted | | DBP | |
| Abdullah Çalışkan | Saray | 20 April 2016 | | sentenced to 7 years, 6 months | for membership in a terror organization | DBP | |
| Mehmet Muhdi Aslan | İdil | 25 Sept. 2016 | | | | DBP | |
| Abdurrahman Zorlu | Hani | 1 Oct. 2016 | | | | DBP | |
| Gültan Kişanak | Diyarbakır | 30 Oct. 2016 | | prosecuted | | DBP | |
| Sabite Ekinci | Varto | 10 Nov. 2016 | | Imprisoned in Sincan prison. | For membership in a terrorist organization. | DBP | |
| Ahmet Türk | Mardin | Nov. 2016 | Feb 2017 | prosecuted | | DBP | |
| Mehmet Ali Bul | Tunceli | Nov. 2016 | | sentenced to 8 years and 9 months | | DBP | |
| Hüseyin Olan | Bitlis | 25 Nov. 2016 | | Imprisoned between 2014 and 2022 | | DBP | |
| Halis Çoskun | Malazgirt | 29 Nov. 2016 | | sentenced to 12 years imprisonment | | DBP | |
| Ismail Asi | Kiziltepe | 2 Dec. 2016 | | prosecuted, arrested in Sakran prison in Izmir | | DBP | |
| Seferi Yılmaz | Semdinli | 6 Dec. 2016 | | | | DBP | |
| Mehmet Ali Aydin | Kayapinar | 8 Dec. 2016 | | | | DBP | |
| Selim Kurbanoğlu | Yenişehir | 8 Dec. 2016 | | | | DBP | |
| Servet Tunc | Çukurka | 8 Dec. 2016 | | | | DBP | |
| Tuncer Bakırhan | Siirt | 16 Dec. 2016 | | sentenced to 10 years and 15 days imprisonment | | DBP | |
| Fırat Öztürk | Tutak | Jan. 2017 | | prosecuted | | DBP | |
| Sara Kaya | Nusaybin | Jan. 2017 | | sentenced to 1 year, and another 16 years imprisonment | | DBP | |
| Süleyman Tekin | Ömerli | 5 Jan. 2017 | | | | DBP | |
| Celalettin Bartu | Çatak | 5 Jan. 2017 | | | | DBP | |
| Zeynel Taş | Bozova | 6 Jan. 2017 | | sentenced to 11 years and 10 months imprisonment | | DBP | |
| Sadiye Süer Baran | Kulp | 6 Jan. 2017 | | prosecuted | | DBP | |
| Emrullah Cin | Viranşehir | 6 Jan. 2017 | | sentenced to 6 years and 3 months imprisonment | | DBP | |
| Murat Ruhat Özbay | Dogubayezit | February 2017 | | | membership in a terrorist organization | DBP | |
| Afüllah Kar | Koçaköy | February 2017 | | | membership for a terrorist organization | DBP | |
| Bekir Kaya | Van | 11 June 2017 | | sentenced to 8 years, 3 Months and another 15 Years imprisonment | | DBP | |
| Rezan Zuĝurlu | Lice | 17 Nov. 2017 | | sentenced to 4 years, 2 Months imprisonment | | DBP | |
| Şerafettin Özalp | Özalp | 7 May 2018 | 27 May 2018 | prosecuted | | DBP | |
2019 -
| Mehmet Fatih Taş | Kulp | Sep. 2019 | | prosecuted | | HDP | |
| Melike Göksu | Karayazı | Sep. 2019 | | prosecuted | | HDP | |
| İrfan Sarı | Yüksekova | 15 Oct. 2019 | | prosecuted | | HDP | |
| Adnan Selçuk Mızraklı | Diyarbakır | 21 Oct. 2019 | | sentenced to 9 years, 4 months imprisonment. Having been imprisoned in Diyarbakir and Kayseri he is currently in Edirne | Sentenced with being a member of the PKK | HDP | |
| Rojda Nazlıer | Kocaköy | 22 Oct. 2019 | | sentenced to 9 years imprisonment | Charged with being a member of the PKK | HDP | |
| Keziban Yılmaz | Kayapınar | 22 Oct. 2019 | March 2020 | sentenced to 7 years and 6 months but released | | HDP | |
| Azim Yacan | Ipekyolu | Nov. 2019 | | prosecuted | | HDP | |
| Hatice Çevik | Suruç | 20 Nov. 2019 | | prosecuted | | HDP | |
| Gülistan Öncü | Savur | 26 Nov. 2019 | | prosecuted | | HDP | |
| Nalan Özaydın | Mazıdağı | 26 Nov. 2019 | | prosecuted | | HDP | |
| Mülkiye Esmez | Derik | 26 Nov. 2019 | | prosecuted | | HDP | |
| Yılmaz Şalan | Muradiye | 10 Dec. 2019 | | prosecuted | | HDP | |
| Dilan Örenci | Özalp | 10 Dec. 2019 | | prosecuted | | HDP | |
| Nilüfer Elik Yılmaz | Kiziltepe | 16 Dez. 2019 | | prosecuted | Arrested in Tarsus | HDP | |
| Feyme Filiz Buluttekin | Sur | 23 Dec. 2019 | | sentenced to 7 years and 6 month imprisonment | | HDP | |
| Mustafa Akkul | Eğil | 25 March 2020 | | prosecuted | | HDP | |
| Casim Budak | Alınova | 16 May 2020 | | prosecuted | | HDP | |
| Yaşar Akkuş | Iğdır | 19 May 2020 | | sentenced to 7 years and 6 month imprisonment | | HDP | |
| Ayhan Bilgen | Kars | 2 Oct. 2020 | | released pending trial in June 2021 | Charged with organizing the Kobanî protests during the Siege of Kobani by the Islamic State of Iraq and the Levant (ISIL). | HDP | |
| Gürbüz Çapan | Esenyurt | 26 Mar. 2004 | 19 May 2004 | Released after 54 days in prison pending trial. | Arrested over corruption and bid rigging allegations; sentenced to prison terms in subsequent trials. | CHP | |
== 2024–2025 ==
| Hüseyin Sarı | Erdek | 20 Nov. 2019 | 25 Nov. 2019 | Released after serving a brief sentence following conviction. | Convicted for misconduct in office; sentenced to 1 year and 15 days in prison. | CHP | |
| Ahmet Özer | Esenyurt | 31 Oct. 2024 | | | | CHP | |
| Cevdet Konak | Tunceli | 20 Nov. 2024 | | | | CHP | |
| Mustafa Sarıgül | Ovacık | 20 Nov. 2024 | | | | CHP | |
| Rıza Akpolat | Beşiktaş | 13 Jan. 2025 | | | Charged with establishing and managing a criminal organization | CHP | |
| Alaattin Köseler | Beykoz | 3 Mar. 2025 | | | | CHP | |
| Ekrem İmamoğlu | Istanbul | 23 Mar. 2025 | | | | CHP | |
| Mehmet Murat Çalık | Beylikdüzü | 23 Mar. 2025 | | | | CHP | |
| Resul Emrah Şahan | Şişli | 23 Mar. 2025 | | | | CHP | |
| Utku Caner Çaykara | Avcılar | 5 Jun. 2025 | | | | CHP | |
| Hasan Akgün | Büyükçekmece | 5 Jun. 2025 | | | | CHP | |
| Hakan Bahçetepe | Gaziosmanpaşa | 5 Jun. 2025 | | | | CHP | |
| Oya Tekin | Seyhan | 5 Jun. 2025 | | | | CHP | |
| Kadir Aydar | Ceyhan | 5 Jun. 2025 | | | | CHP | |
| Muhittin Böcek | Antalya | 5 Jul. 2025 | | | | CHP | |
| Zeydan Karalar | Adana | 8 Jul. 2025 | | | | CHP | |
| Niyazi Nefi Kara | Manavgat | 8 Jul. 2025 | | | | CHP | |

== See also ==
- Crime in Turkey
- Democratic backsliding
- Human rights in Turkey
- Political repression
