= Ceylan Önkol =

Kurdish girl (1997–2009)

Ceylan Önkol (16 September 1997 – 28 September 2009) was a 12-year-old Kurdish girl who was killed by a howitzer by the Turkish military while she was pasturing sheep in Hambaz (Xambaz) hamlet of Şenlik village in Turkey's southeastern Lice district in Diyarbakır province on September 28, 2009. In the early days, the incident was thought to have occurred as a result of the explosion of a mortar shell allegedly thrown from the Tapantepe Police Station. However, according to the forensic medical report issued on 16 October, Ceylan struck an unexploded mortar shell in the countryside with a metal-powered device and caused it to explode, which resulted in her death.

== Incident ==
On 28 September 2009, 12-year-old Ceylan Önkol went to graze animals in Hambaz hamlet of Şenlik Village of Lice. During this task, she was killed by a mortar shell, initially alleged to have been fired from Tapantepe Police Station. (Note: Some sources say she was killed as a result of a mortar shell fired from the Yayla Police Station.) The prosecutor and the doctor who did the autopsy did not go to the scene on the grounds that the area was risky and did not have enough security due to the fact that it was a "terror likely zone". This situation also postponed the forensic examination. Ceylan's body was left at the scene for six hours. Her body was then taken to the police station by the villagers and an autopsy was performed.

In the reports prepared by the gendarmerie and the police, it was claimed that Önkol hit the explosive with a tahra (curved pruning knife), causing the explosion. However, according to Önkol's family, the end of the knife was not damaged, and was bent in the middle; the family stated this was proof that the child did not hit the bomb with the knife.

Brigadier General Metin Gürak, Chief of Communication Department of the Turkish General Staff, held a briefing on October 10 and made a presentation with a map and a photo. He stated that investigations on the day of the event determined that the mortar had been shot prior to 28 September. He added that the pit formed in the land where the explosion took place was different from the pits that get form after bombings, and Önkol's death could have been caused by a different type of explosion. Gürak implied that the PKK was responsible for the incident, saying it was a high-risk land with handmade explosives and mines. He also said that Önkol's death was being used as propaganda against the Turkish Armed Forces and that an organized psychological operation was being carried out.

According to the investigation report issued by the İHD Diyarbakır Branch, Mazlumder Diyarbakır Branch, Diyarbakır Bar Association and Diyarbakır Medical Chamber, on 5 October 2009, the incident was not investigated properly due to the negligence of the Lice public prosecutor's office and the security forces. It stated that necessary sensitivity was not shown in relation to the disclosure of the incident according to the principles of national and international law.

== Investigations ==
A decision regarding the confidentiality of information was later applied the case. The application for the abolition of the confidentiality in the investigation was rejected by the court on 14 October. However, due to the completion of the expert report, the Lice Public Prosecutor's Office lifted the confidentiality two days later. DTP member Selahattin Demirtaş filed a criminal complaint against the prosecutor Çolak on the allegations of "abuse of power and obscuring evidence of crime". Thereupon, the Ministry of Justice, launched an investigation to address the allegations about Çolak. An investigation was opened against the gendarmes in Lice on 25 October 2009 on the grounds that they did not take Lice Public Prosecutor Mustafa Kamil Çolak to the scene where the incident occurred. On 4 April 2013, this investigation resulted in non-prosecution on the grounds that 'there was no evidence that any crimes had occurred'. On 30 April 2014, the Lice Chief Public Prosecutor's office, conducting the investigation, concluded that the evidence and reports in the file were inadequate for the detection of the perpetrators and decided to issue a "permanent search order" for the case.

In 2010, the lawyers of the Önkol family applied to the ECtHR, trying to reject the confidentiality decision taken during the investigation. In May 2012, the family re-applied to the ECtHR because the investigation was not conducted effectively and impartially, requests for deepening the investigation were rejected, and despite the long time span, no suspects were found. In 2017, following Önkol family's urge for conducting effective investigation in the judicial process related to Ceylan's death and insistence on the violation of Article 2 of the right to life by the Convention Court, ECtHR decided that in either of those cases Turkey had not violated any laws or regulations. On 15 May 2019, a Turkish court ruled that her family should be paid ₺28,208 in pecuniary damages.

== In the media ==
The incident, which occurred on 28 September, was not mentioned in the media in the early days by any platforms, except Taraf newspaper and CNN Türk. Ardından The editor-in-chief of Taraf, Ahmet Altan, published an article titled "Will you be silent?" and criticized the media and politicians who remained silent in the face of the incident:

Almost all of Turkey is silent. Look at this media. What kind of silence is this? My god! Why can't a newspaper ask about an incident that caused a child's death? Shame on you for wasting all the paper, ink, and labor [on worthless topics]. You live in a country where a girl was shot and smashed with a rocket, the state disappeared, the prosecutor did not go to the village, and the doctor did an autopsy in the police station yard. Doesn't any of this sound strange to you? Don't you even find one of these news-worthy?

— Taraf newspaper editor-in-chief Ahmet Altan

Following these remarks, in order to spread the news about the incident, Milliyet covered Ahmet Altan's article on its headline for 2 October. A group of women artists and activists filed a criminal complaint against the Lice prosecutor who did not go to the scene after the death of Önkol and did not initiate an investigation in time, and about the General Staff and the Ministry of Interior on the grounds that they had not made a satisfactory statement to the public. Conservative female journalists, including Lale Mansur, Eren Keskin, İlkay Akkaya, Roni Margulies, Cemile Bayraktar, Hidayet Şefkatli Tuksal, Hilal Kaplan, and Nihal Bengisu Karaca, all sent a letter to Prime Minister Erdoğan in their capacity as members of the activist group Buluşan Kadınlar and stated that as long as their forces were enough, they would continue to ask about Ceylan's death until they are enlightened.

BirGün newspaper writer Enver Aysever criticized the liberals in an article for overreacting to the incident. His statements drew reactions from both his own newspaper and other people. Later Aysever left his position at BirGün.

Nazan Öncel composed a song for Ceylan Önkol about a month after her death. Sezen Aksu prepared a lament for Ceylan Önkol which was first published in Yaşar Gaga's album Alakasız Şarkılar. Aksu performed the song "Ceylan" together with Tarkan.

== Legacy ==
A park in Lice was named in her memory. However, on the anniversary of her death in 2017, Sinan Başak, the trustee for Lice who re-emplaced the dismissed mayor Rezan Zuğurlu, changed the name of the park to Fırat Sımpil Park. In Kayapinar, another park was also named after Önkol.
