= Genetically Modified Tomato Awards =

The Genetically Modified Tomato Awards (Turkish: Hormonlu Domates Ödülleri) are annual awards given by the Turkish LGBT community to queerphobic people and institutions in order to draw attention to homophobia, transphobia and sexual discrimination. The first Genetically Modified Tomato Awards were given in 2005 by Lambda Istanbul, and it is currently given by the Istanbul Pride Committee. The title of the award comes from sports commentator Erman Toroğlu, who said that the "genetically modified tomatoes are turning people gay".

Due to COVID-19 regulations, 2020 award ceremony was planned to be livestreamed on YouTube, but it was later removed for "Violation of Terms of Service", then later held on Zoom.

== Winners ==
=== 2005 ===
- Lifetime Genetically Modified Tomato - Jury Special Award: Erman Toroğlu

=== 2009 ===
- Best in Psychiatry/Psychology: Nevzat Tarhan
- Best Writer: Ali Bulaç
- Best Official Institution: Directorate of Religious Affairs
- Best Politician: Burhan Kuzu
- Best in Media: Akit
- Best Social Place: Miko Kafe
- Best TV Personality: Fikret Kuşkan
- Best TV Show: Çok Güzel Hareketler Bunlar
- Best Film: Recep İvedik
- International Award: Pope Benedict XVI and the Catholic Church

=== 2010 ===
- Best in Psychiatry/Psychology: Cem Keçe
- Best Writer: Hilal Kaplan
- Best Civil Organization: Mazlumder, Özgürder, IHH and 24 others
- Best Official Institution/Politician: General Directorate of Security
- Best in Media: Vakit
- Best Social Place: The Hall
- Best TV Personality: Esra Erol
- Best in Education: Ministry of National Education
- International Award: Serbia and the Serbian police
- Lifetime Genetically Modified Tomato - Jury Special Award: Selma Aliye Kavaf

=== 2011 ===
- Best Official Institution: Turkish Armed Forces
- Best Organization: Justice and Development Party
- Best Civil Organization: Gazeteciler ve Yazarlar Vakfı
- Best Writer: Fatih Altaylı
- Best Newspaper Sabah
- Best in Education: Middle East Technical University
- Best Social Place: Taksim Live
- Best TV Personality: Osman Sınav
- International Award: Malmö Municipality ve and the Swedish Police Authority
  - Pink Wash Award: IGLYO

=== 2012 ===
- Best in Psychiatry/Psychology: Yusuf Karaçay
- Best Writer: Ayşe Kulin
- Best Organization: Justice and Development Party
- Best Civil Organization: Ahmet Faruk Ünsal and Recep Karagöz from Mazlumder
- Best Politician: Melih Gökçek
- Best in Media: Yeni Akit
- Best Social Place: Taksim Mango
- Best TV Personality: İlkbar Gürpınar
- International Award: Northern Cyprus
- Lifetime Genetically Modified Tomato - Jury Special Award: İdris Naim Şahin

=== 2013 ===
- Best TV Show: Pis Yedili
- Best Social Place: The Hall
- Best Writer: Engin Ardıç
- Best Politician: Bekir Bozdağ
- Best Organization: Justice and Development Party
- International Award: Russia
- Lifetime Genetically Modified Tomato - Jury Special Award: Türkan Dağoğlu
- Penguin Special Award:
  - Best Politician: Melih Gökçek and Recep Tayyip Erdoğan
  - Best TV Channel: Habertürk TV
  - Best Newspaper and Writer: Yeni Şafak and Nihal Bengisu Karaca

=== 2014 ===
- Best Official Institution: Ministry of the Interior
- Best Politician: Recep Tayyip Erdoğan
- Best in Media: Yeni Akit
- Best in Entertainment: Okan Bayülgen
- Best in Education: Yeditepe University
- Best in Sports: Mateja Kežman
- Best Social Place: Kızılay Shopping Center
- Best in Censoring: Grand National Assembly of Turkey
- International Award: Russia

=== 2015 ===
- Best in Education: İhsan Karaman
- Best Publication: Kızları Kız, Erkekleri Erkek Gibi Yetiştirmek (Raising Girls Like Girls, and Raising Boys Like Boys) by Banu Yaşar
- Best in Censoring: Zorlu PSM
- Best Official Institution: Turkish Language Association
- Best in Sports: Fenerbahçe S.K.
- Best in Media: Engin Ardıç
- Best Politician: Recep Tayyip Erdoğan
- Best in Entertainment: Niran Ünsal
- International Award: Switzerland (immigration office)

=== 2016 ===
- Best in Education: Istanbul University
- Best in Health: Cüneyt Genç
- Best Official Institution: Esat Police Station
- Best in Media: 140journos
- Best TV Personality: Can Yaman
- Best in Targeting: Young Islamic Defense
- Best Politician: Bülent Arınç
- International Award: Homophobic attackers in CERN

=== 2017 ===
- Best in Entertainment: Nihat Doğan and Demet Akalın
- Best in Health: Macfit
- Best in Censoring: International Istanbul Film Festival
- Best Social Place: Tek Yön and Love
- Best in Politics: Ankara Regional Court of Appeal 17th Penal Chamber
- Best Media: Yeni Akit
- Best in Education: Kinder Chocolate
- International Award: Chechnya and Russia

=== 2018 ===
- Best in Entertainment: Hilal Cebeci
- Best in Education: Doğan Azezli
- Best TV Personalities: Seda Akgül and Hakan Ural
- Best in Media: Atilla Dorsay
- Best Institution: Turkish Red Crescent
- Best in Politics: Governor of Ankara
- International Award: Donald Trump
- Special Misogyny Award: Rüzgar Erkoçlar

=== 2019 ===
- Best Institution: TİHAK and the Directorate of Religious Affairs
- Best Civil Organization: Pedagogy Association
- Best TV Channel: TV5
- Best in Politics: Alinur Aktaş
- Best Governor: Governor of Ankara
  - Special Award: Governor of Istanbul
- Best in Media: Yeni Akit
- Best in Education: Verşan Kök
- Best in Entertainment: Mustafa Ceceli
- Best Social Place: Sensus Şarap Evi Galata
- International Award: Donald Trump
- Special Bi+phobia Award: Söylemezsem Olmaz
- Lifetime Genetically Modified Tomato - Jury Special Award: Süleyman Soylu

=== 2020 ===
- Best Institution: Directorate of Religious Affairs
- Best in Politics: Doğu Perinçek
- Best in Education: Boğaziçi University Rectorate
- Best in Medicine: Metin Çakır
- Best Civil Organization: Association of Lawyers
- Best in Media: Hilal Kaplan
- Best TV Personality: İsmail Küçükkaya
- Best Online Application: Ekşi Sözlük
- Best in Gay-centrism: Gmag
- Transphobia Special Award: J. K. Rowling
- International Award: Viktor Orbán
- Surprise Award: Directorate of Religious Affairs President Ali Erbaş
