= Keziban Yılmaz =

Keziban Yılmaz is a lawyer and politician of the Peoples Democratic Party (HDP) and a former mayor of Kayapinar in Diyarbakir province.

== Education and early life ==
She was born in Bismil and graduated from the faculty of law of the Dicle University in Diyarbakir. Between 2008 and 2012 she was a member of the Diyarbakir branch of the Turkish Human Rights Association. As such she lamented the imprisonment of children accused of terror related charges for throwing stones or taking part in marches.

== Professional career ==
Between 2012 and 2014 she was also the general secretary of the women's branch of the Diyarbakir Bar Association. In 2017, she and 249 other lawyers unsuccessfully requested to visit Abullah Öcalan, the former leader of the Kurdistan Workers Party (PKK) in prison on Imrali island. In 2018, she became a member of the board of the football club Amedspor.

== Political career ==
After having been involved for the Democratic Regions Party (DBP) she became the candidate for the mayorship of Kayapinar for the HDP. During her electoral campaign she supported the actions of the former mayors of the HDP, who had been imprisoned and did not worry for being removed as Recep Tayyip Erdogan had threatened to do with the ones who support terrorist organizations. On the 31 March 2019, Yilmaz was elected the mayor of Kayapinar in the local elections with over 60% of the voter share. After she assumed her post, she questioned the fact that the municipality building was transferred to the District Governor and the die Kindergarten to the Mufti. In October 2022, the Government appointed a trustee in her place.

=== Prosecution ===
On the 21 August 2019, she was detained together with Adnan Selçuk Mizrakli the Mayor of Diyarbakir and Orhan Ayaz, the Mayor of Bismil and accused of terrorism related charges. She was in pre-trial detention until the 22 October 2019, when she was formally arrested. The same month, she was transferred from the prison in Diyarbakir to the Bunyan prison in Kayseri Province in Central Anatolia. In March 2020 he was released despite having been sentenced to seven and a half years imprisonment. She was released with a travel ban. She was pregnant on her release. In March 2021, the state prosecutor before the court of cassation Bekir Sahin demanded a political ban of five years for her and 687 people together with the closure of the HDP.
