= Baykara =

Baykara is a Turkish surname. Notable people with the surname include:

- Deniz Baykara (born 1984), Turkish footballer
- Sertan Baykara, German journalist
- Yuce Baykara, Canadian CEO and Lawyer

== See also ==
- Baykara, Kayapınar, village in Turkey
- Demir and Baykara v Turkey
