= Sezgin Tanrıkulu =

Turkish politician

Sezgin Tanrıkulu MP
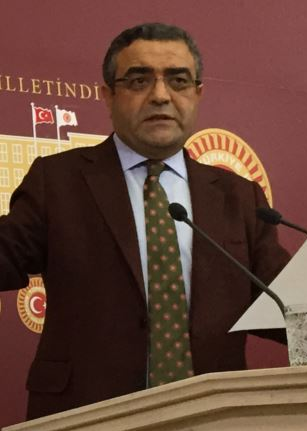

Deputy Leader of the Republican People's Party
- In office 19 December 2010 – 25 January 2016
- Leader: Kemal Kılıçdaroğlu

Member of the Grand National Assembly
- Incumbent
- Assumed office 12 June 2011
- Constituency: İstanbul (II) (2011, June 2015, Nov 2015, 2018); Diyarbakır (2023)

President of the Diyarbakır Bar Association
- In office 2002–2008

Personal details
- Born: 27 May 1963 (age 63) Diyarbakır, Turkey
- Party: Republican People's Party (2010–present)
- Occupation: Lawyer
- Known for: Advocacy for Kurdish rights
- Awards: Robert F. Kennedy Human Rights Award (1997)
- Organisation: Diyarbakır Human Rights Association

Sezgin Tanrıkulu (born 27 May 1963) is a Turkish human rights lawyer and politician who has been a member of the Grand National Assembly of Turkey for the Republican People's Party (CHP) since 2011. He is known for his work on cases involving Kurdish citizens, mostly during the 1980s and 1990s. Born in Diyarbakır, Tanrıkulu co-founded the Diyarbakır branch of the Human Rights Association and served as president of the Diyarbakır Bar Association from 2002 to 2008. He received the Robert F. Kennedy Human Rights Award in 1997. After joining the CHP in 2010 he was one o the party's deputy chairmen until 2016 and was elected to parliament from Istanbul in 2011, 2015 and also in 2018. In 2023 he was elected from Diyarbakır, the first CHP candidate to win a seat there since 2002. Tanrıkulu has been a subject of several criminal investigations over public statements, including remarks on the military and on the Armenian genocide. He is currently serving as an MP in the Turkish Grand Assembly with the Republican People's Party (CHP).

== Early life and education ==
Tanrıkulu is from Diyarbakır, Turkey. He attended law school in Istanbul, graduating in 1984. When he returned to Diyarbakır, he found it under emergency rule by the Turkish government and its mayor Mehdi Zana, husband of politician Leyla Zana, charged with separatism. Tanrıkulu became involved in Zana's case and soon became a full-time human rights lawyer.

== Professional career ==
He is the co-founder of the Diyarbakır Human Rights Association and the representative of the Human Rights Foundation of Turkey. He advised the people how to file a case at the European Court of Human Rights. He was indicted several times for his legal activities. In 1994, he was charged with "insulting the judiciary" after he appealed a conviction that had relied on a statement extracted by torture. From 1990 to 1995, six of his friends and colleagues were murdered for their work on human rights cases. He was the President of the Diyarbakır Bar Association from 2002 to 2008.

== Political career ==
Sezgin Tanrıkulu joined the Republican People's Party (CHP) in 2010, becoming the CHP director of Human Rights and was elected a member of the Grand National Assembly of Turkey in 2011. He was re-elected each time and currently is still a member of parliament. In parliament he defended the minority rights and the human rights of the prisoners. He is also defender of the press freedom in Turkey, and released a report which criticized the closing down of media outlets and the imprisonment of journalists. He opposed the arrest of the academics for peace who signed a petition urging for a peaceful solution of the Kurdish-Turkish conflict in 2016. In September 2020, it was reported that Tanrıkulu was appointed the advisor to party leader Kemal Kılıcdaroğlu. In the 2023 Turkish general election, Tanrıkulu was the parliamentary candidate of the CHP in Diyarbakır; he became the first CHP candidate to be elected from Diyarbakır since Mesut Değer and Muhsin Koçyiğit in 2002.

=== Return to parliament 2023 ===
In the 2023 Turkish general election Tanrıkulu stood as the CHP's lead candidate in Diyarbakır and was elected, becoming the first CHP candidate to win a seat in the province since 2002.

=== 2023 remarks on the military ===
On 8 September 2023, Tanrıkulu said on a television programme that the Turkish Armed Forces should not be exempt from criticism. He cited the 1980 coup, the 2016 coup attempt and the burning of villages in the 1990s and said soldier had once thrown 15 villagers from a helicopter, a case he said had been established by a European Court of Human Rights ruling. President Recep Tayyip Erdoğan responded on 11 September, saying Tanrıkulu would be punished and accusing himself of aligning with the PKK, the YPG and the HDP.

The CHP's spokesman, Faik Öztrak, called the remarks unacceptable and said they will be discussed by the party's bodies and party leader Kemal Kılıçdaroğlu said the party regarded the military with affection. A group of 94 Diyarbakır civil society, professional and business organizations and the HDP-successor Green Left Party MP Sırrı Süreyya Önder, defended him. The Ankara Chief Public Prosecutor's Office opened an investigation. On 13 September its parliamentary bureau sent the Justice Ministry a request for permission to proceed on a charge of publicly denigrating the state's military and police organizations.

=== Statements on trustee mayors (2023) ===
On 14 November 2023, Tanrıkulu told parliament that government-appointed trustees who had replaced dismissed elected mayor in Diyarbakır had preceded over corrupt zoning decisions, particularly in the Bağlar and Kayapınar districts. He called for transparent cross party investigation and said that the governing AKP bore responsibility.

=== 2026 meeting with Bahçeli ===
On 17 June 2026, Tanrıkulu met Devlet Bahçeli, leader of the Nationalist Movement Party (MHP), in Ankara. He said later that he had thanked Bahçeli on his own behalf and on behalf of Diyarbakır for his efforts towards a peaceful resolution of the Kurdish issue.

== Awards ==
In 1997, he received the Robert F. Kennedy Human Rights Award along with fellow attorney Senal Sarihan. This is an award given each year to an individual whose courageous activism is at the heart of the human rights movement and in the spirit of Robert F. Kennedy's vision and legacy.
