= Boyunlu =

Boyunlu can refer to:

- Boyunlu, Kocaköy
- Boyunlu, Silvan
