= Sultantepe (disambiguation) =

Sultantepe may refer to:

- Sultantepe
- Sultantepe, Istanbul
- Sultantepe, Kayapınar
- Sultantepe, Üsküdar
