= Bengisu =

Bengisu (Turkish: Water of Life) is a Turkish feminine given name and a surname. It is a compound word: bengi refers to eternal and su refers to water in Turkish. Notable people with the name are as follows:

== Given name ==
=== First name ===
- Bengisu Avcı (born 1996), Turkish long-distance swimmer
- Bengisu Erçetin (born 2001), Turkish badminton player

=== Middle name ===
- Nihal Bengisu Karaca (born 1972), Turkish journalist

== Surname ==
- Buket Bengisu (born 1978), known as Buket Bengisu and Group Safir, Turkish musical artist
- Lerzan Bengisu (1906–1978), Turkish sculptor and woodcrafter
