= Sheikh Matar Mosque =

Mosque in Diyarbakır, Turkey

- Şeyh Matar Camii (Şeyh Mutahhar Camii); Mizgefta Şêx Matar (Mizgefta Şêx Mutahar)
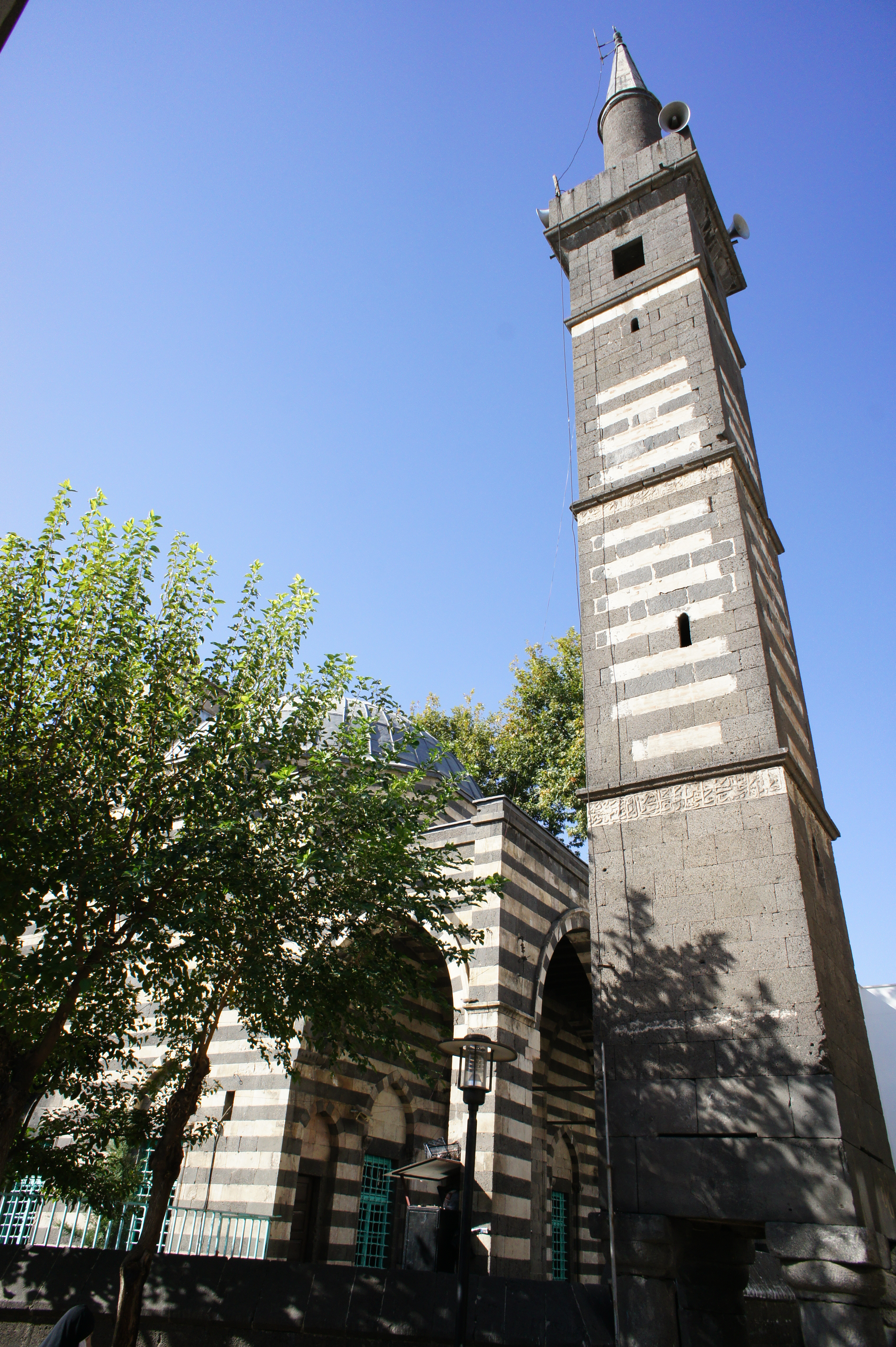
- Sheikh Matar Mosque with Four-legged Minaret

- Location of Sheikh Matar Mosque in Turkey

Religion
- Affiliation: Sunni Islam
- Status: Active

Location
- Location: Savaş Mah., Yenikapı Sok. Diyarbakır, Turkey
- Interactive map of Sheikh Matar Mosque
- Coordinates: 37.910778°N 40.237611°E

Architecture
- Type: Islamic architecture
- Style: Mosque
- Completed: 1500; 526 years ago

Specifications
- Capacity: 500
- Dome: 1
- Minaret: 1
- Materials: Stone and brick

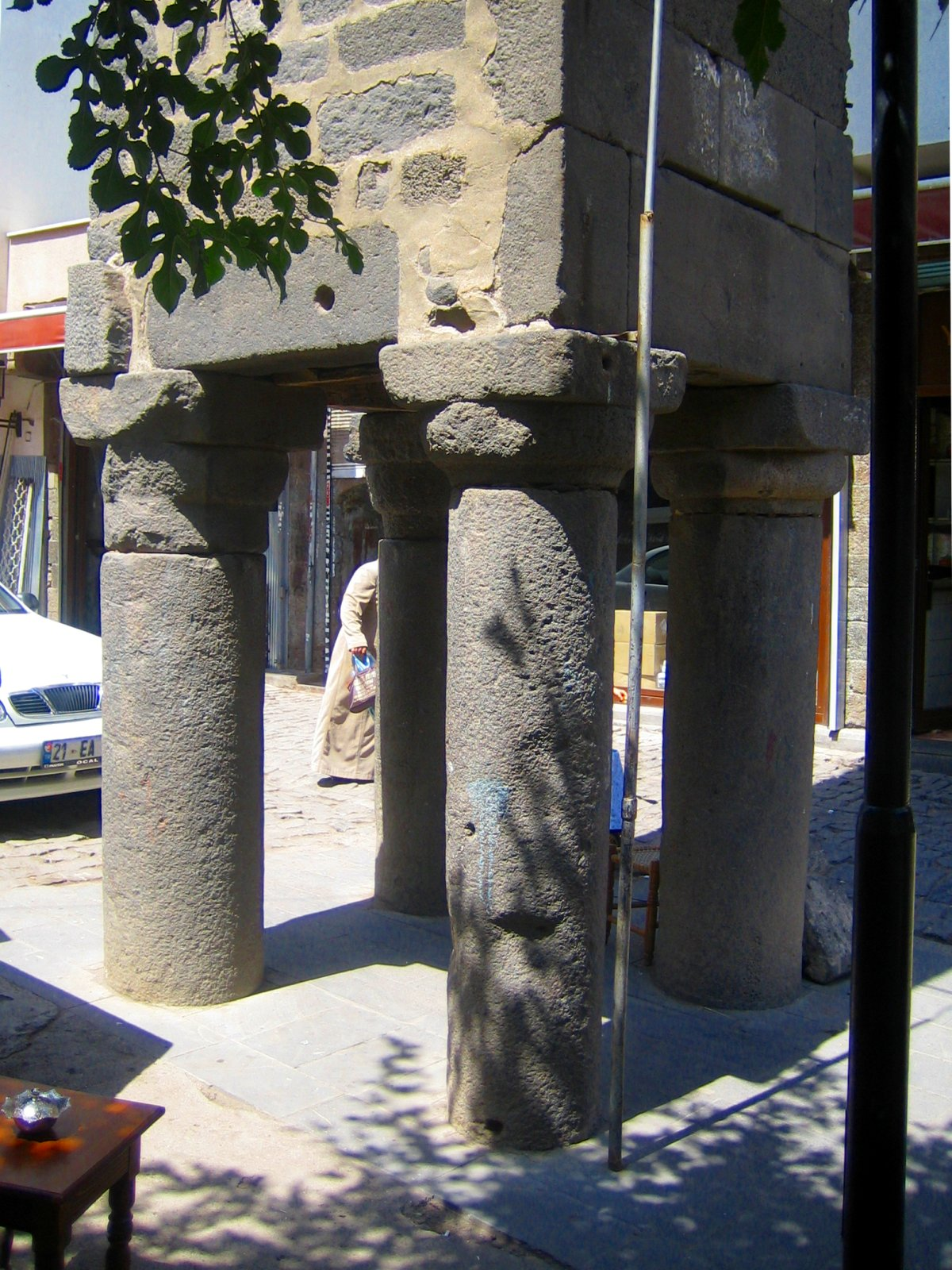
Base of the Four-legged Minaret next to Sheikh Matar Mosque.

Sheikh Matar Mosque or Sheikh Mutahhar Mosque (Turkish: Şeyh Matar Camii, Kurdish: Mizgefta Şêx Matar or Mizgefta Şêx Mutahar) is a historical mosque in Diyarbakır, Turkey, best known for its unique minaret based on four columns, dubbed the Four-legged Minaret (Turkish: Dört Ayaklı Minare, Kurdish: Minareya Çarling).

The mosque is situated in the Yenikapı Street of Savaş neighborhood at Diyarbakır's walled historical district of Sur. The mosque is named after Sheikh Matar (Mutahhar) as it is believed that the mosque's estate covering 600 m^{2} (6,500 sq ft) contains the grave of the sheikh.

According to an inscription attached at the minaret, the mosque was built by Hajji Hüseyin, son of Hajji Ömer during the reign of Ag Qoyunlu Sultan Kasım Han in 1500. Locally, it is also known as the "Kasım Padishah Mosque". It is owned by the General Directorate of Foundations.

The mosque is a single-dome, quadratic-plan building having stone masonry walls alternating with brick. There are three windows at each side, and two in the front and backside each, all arched. The two windows on the qibla wall are closed with masonry. It has a covered area of 221 m^{2} (2,380 sq ft), and can hold up to 500 worshipers.

The stand-alone minaret in the form of a quadratic prism is erected on four massive stone columns. In the "Diyarbakır Salnâmeleri" (Yearbooks of Diyarbakır), it is recorded that the tower was built in 906 as a stable and high structure, and was converted into a minaret with the construction of the mosque next to it after the conquest of the region by Islamic people. Today, local people construe that the four columns at the minaret's base symbolize the four main denominations of Sunni Islam, namely Hanafi, Hanbali, Maliki and Shafi'i.

The mosque underwent a restoration in 1960 through the General Directorate of Foundations.

== Gallery ==
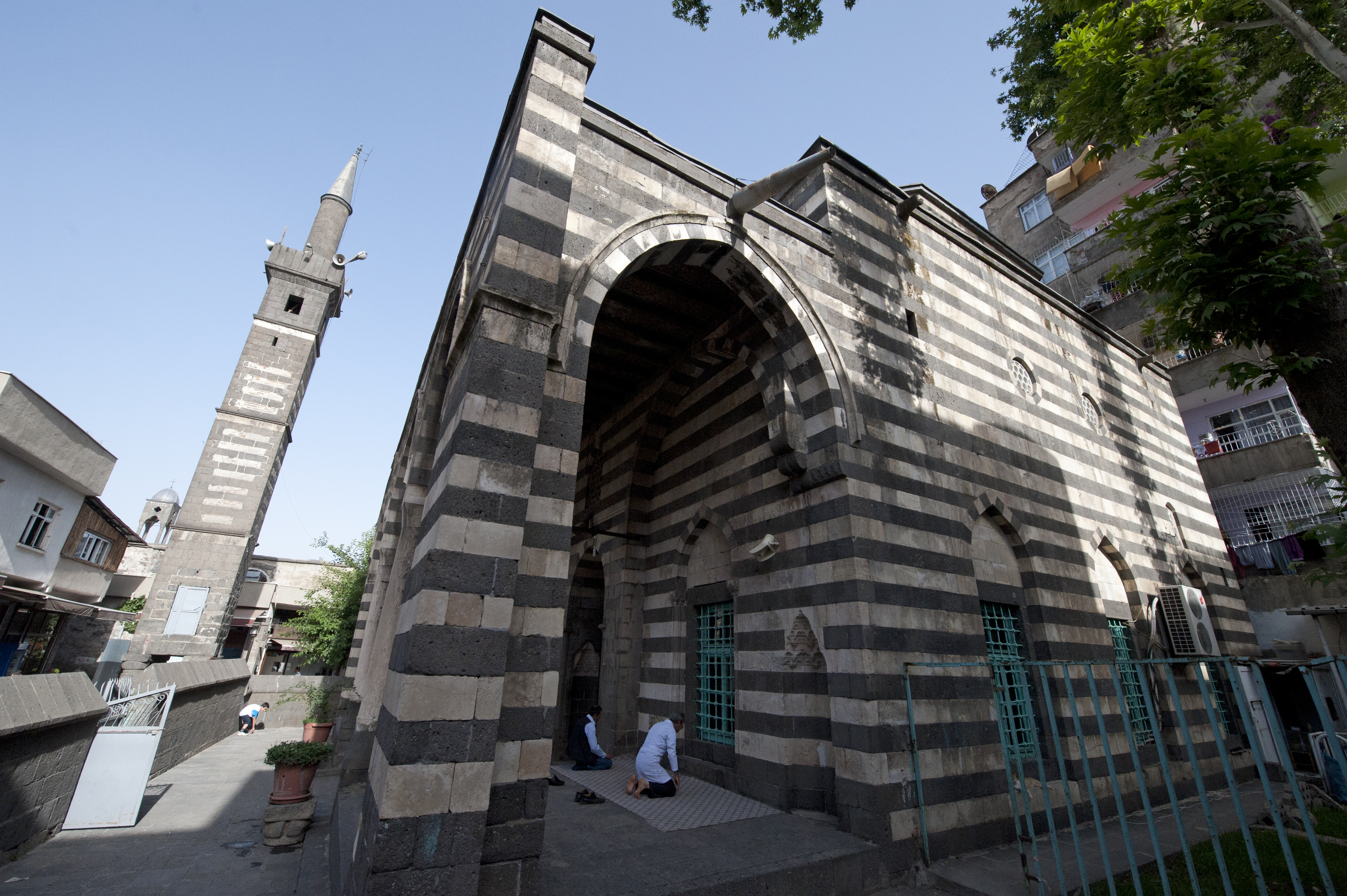
Diyarbakır Sheikh Matar Mosque and Four footed minaret

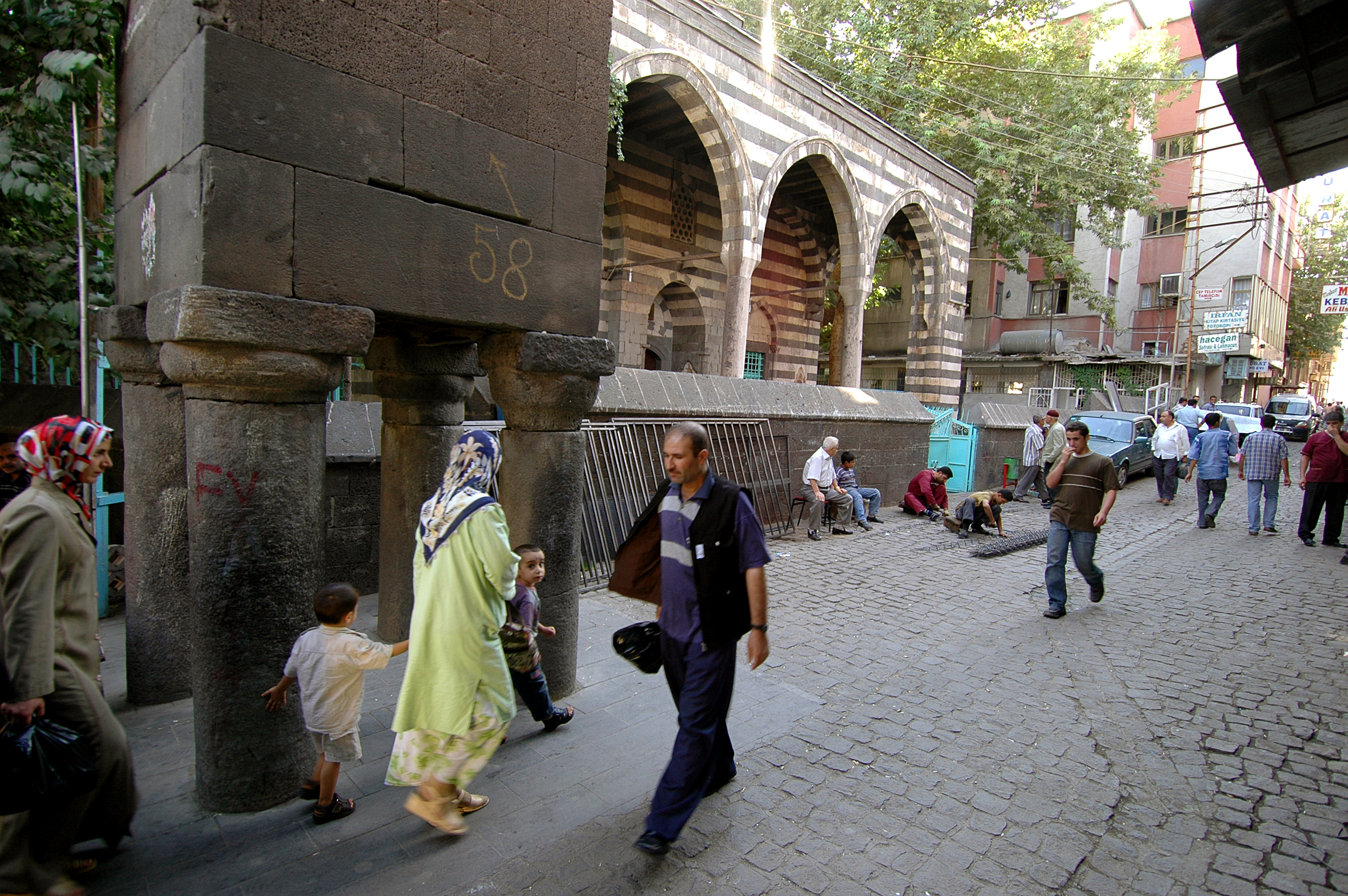
Diyarbakır Sheikh Matar Mosque and Four footed minaret

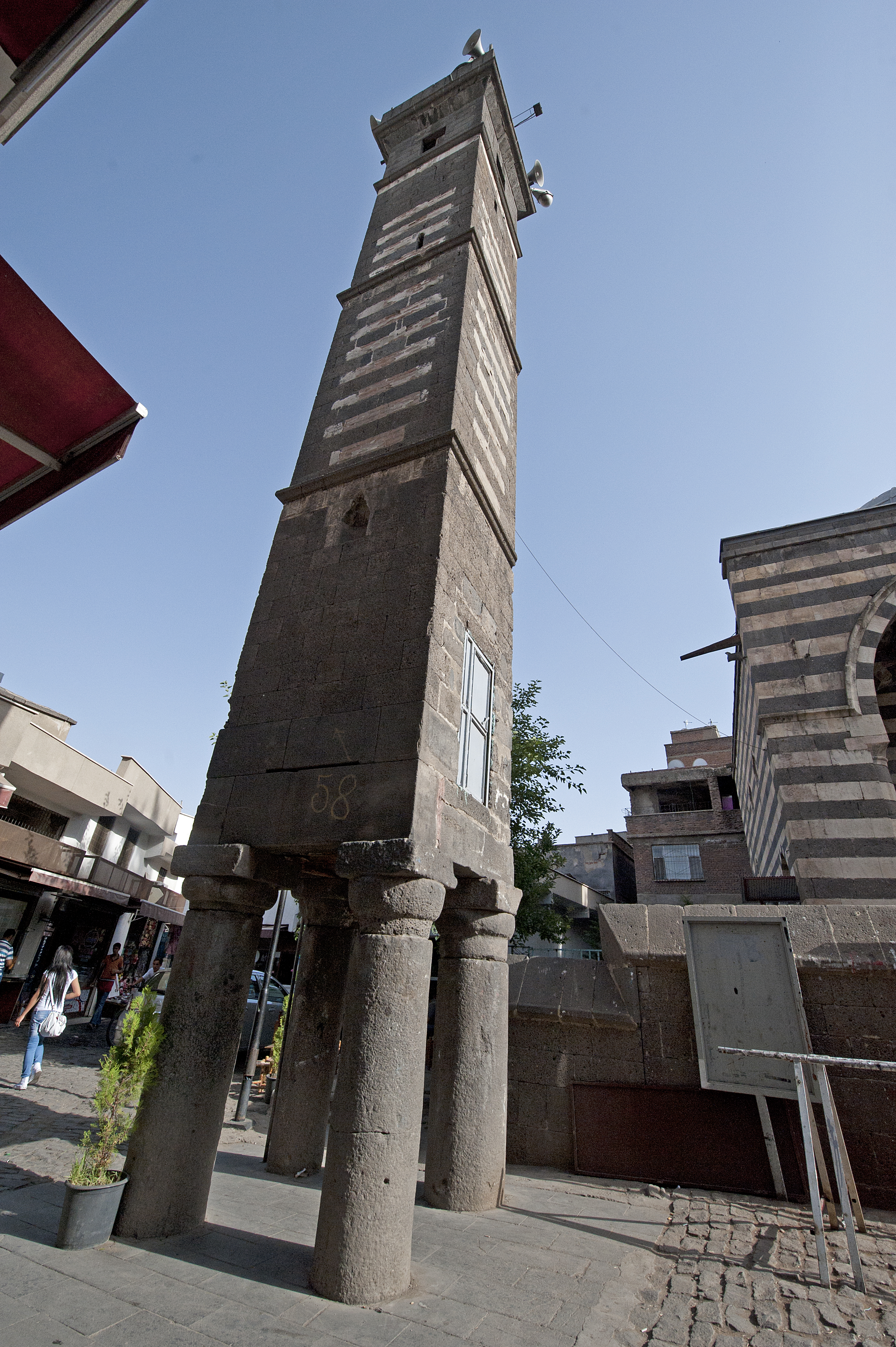
Diyarbakır Sheikh Matar Mosque Four footed minaret

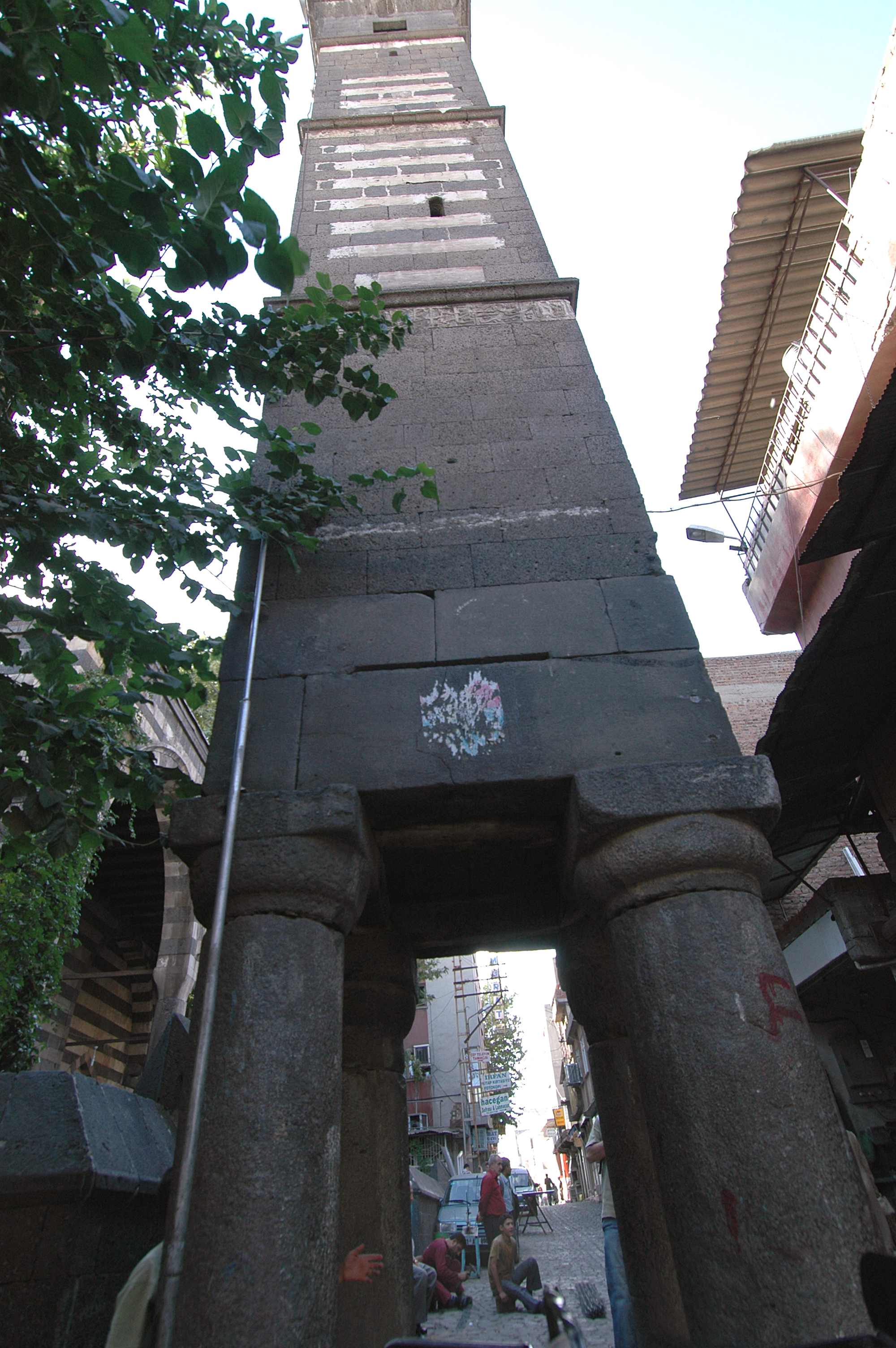
Diyarbakır Sheikh Matar Mosque Four footed minaret

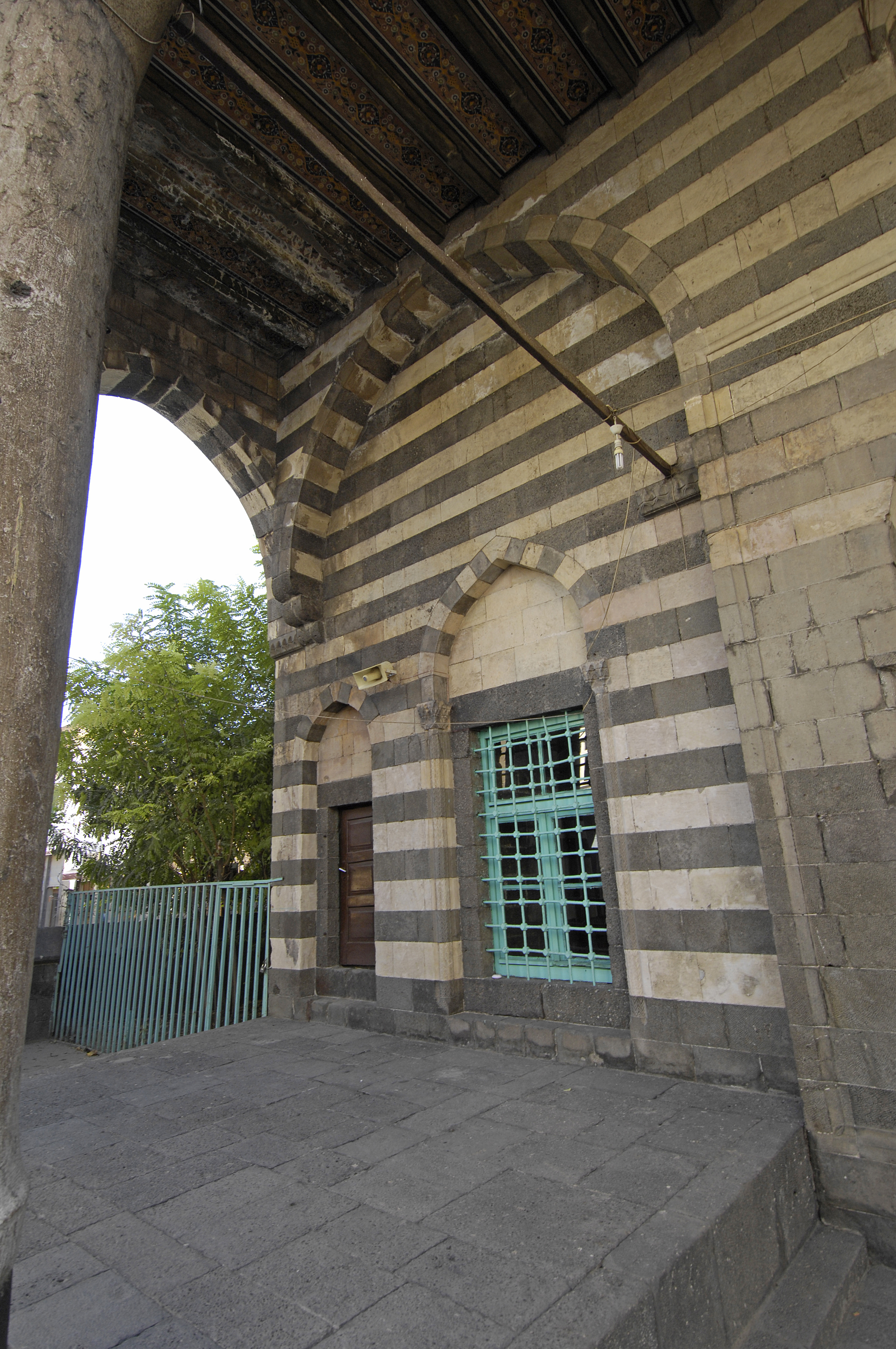
Diyarbakır Sheikh Matar Mosque Son cemaat area

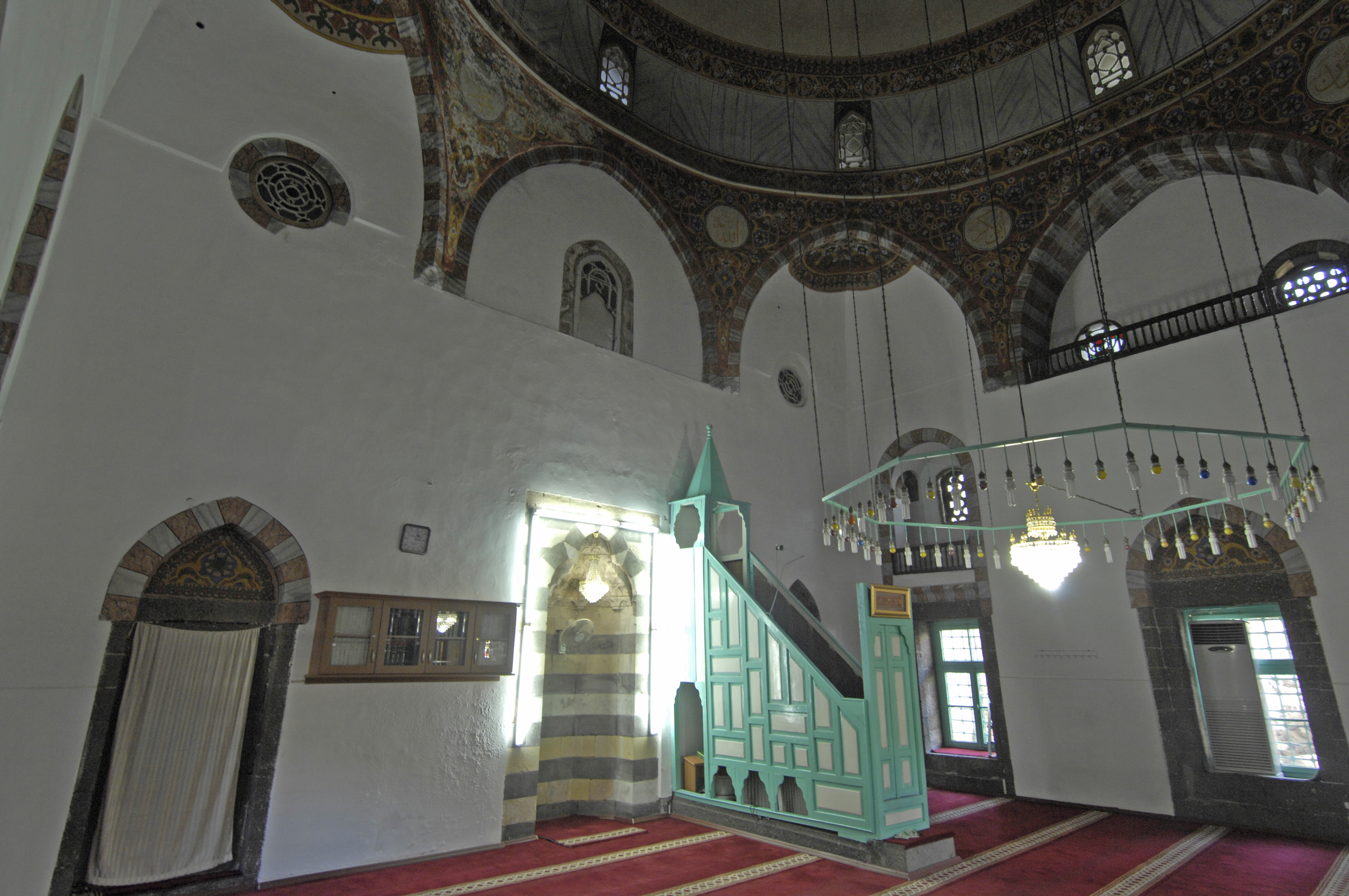
Diyarbakır Sheikh Matar Mosque Interior

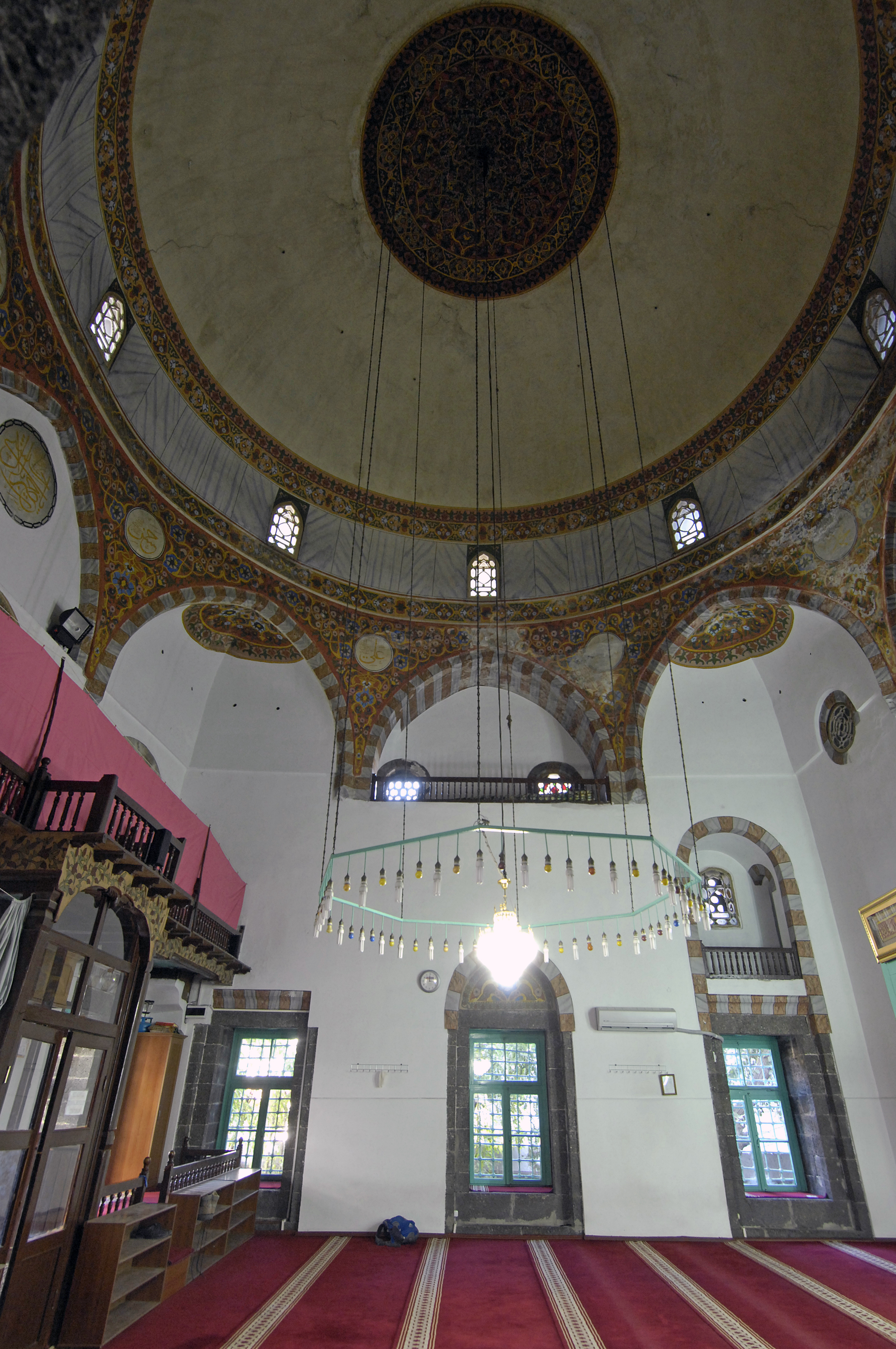
Diyarbakır Sheikh Matar Mosque Interior

== Shootout scene ==
During a shootout between the members of the Kurdish militant group Patriotic Revolutionary Youth Movement (YDG-H) and the police, two columns of the minaret suffered damage by automatic weapon fire in the night of November 25, 2015. Tahir Elçi, the then chairman of Diyarbakır Bar Association, reacted to the incident with a tweet naming it a "complot".

On November 28, 2015, Tahir Elçi gave a press statement at the Four-legged Minaret calling for an end to violence. He said that "armed conflicts with heavy weapons within living areas of civilians like the walled district of Sur in Diyarbakır are not only against the Geneva Conventions, they also damage many historical buildings and mosques. The damage seen on the Four-legged Minaret shows how important our demand is to end armed conflicts and -police- operations within living areas."

Shortly after his speech, a shootout erupted between the attacking militants and the police when police stopped a taxi not far from the minaret. Tahir Elçi was hit by a single bullet to his head and died at the spot. Two undercover police officers, including the personal guard of Elçi, were also killed during the shootout.
