= Kaldırım =

Kaldırım may refer to:

- Kaldırım, Kayapınar
- Kaldırım, Yumurtalık, a village in Adana Province, Turkey
- Kalderimi, a cobblestone-paved road

== People with the surname ==
- Hasan Ali Kaldırım, Turkish footballer
