= Günalan, Kocaköy =

Village in Turkey

Günalan
- Neighbourhood
- Location in Turkey
- Coordinates: 38.1912°N 40.5672°E
- Country: Turkey
- Province: Diyarbakır
- District: Kocaköy
- Population (2022): 473
- Time zone: UTC+3 (TRT)

Günalan (Kurdish: Akrak) is a neighbourhood in the municipality and district of Kocaköy, Diyarbakır Province in Turkey. It is populated by Kurds and had a population of 473 in 2022.
