= Avcısuyu, Kayapınar =

Village in Turkey

Avcısuyu
- Neighbourhood
- Location in Turkey
- Coordinates: 38°04′10″N 39°59′31″E
- Country: Turkey
- Province: Diyarbakır
- District: Kayapınar
- Population (2022): 610
- Time zone: UTC+3 (TRT)

Avcısuyu is a neighbourhood in the municipality and district of Kayapınar, Diyarbakır Province in Turkey. Its population is 610 (2022).
