= Yolboyu Pirinçlık, Kayapınar =

Village in Turkey

Yolboyu Pirinçlık
- Neighbourhood
- Location in Turkey
- Coordinates: 37°54′0″N 40°0′14″E
- Country: Turkey
- Province: Diyarbakır
- District: Kayapınar
- Population (2022): 5,616
- Time zone: UTC+3 (TRT)

Yolboyu Pirinçlık is a neighbourhood in the municipality and district of Kayapınar, Diyarbakır Province in Turkey. It is populated by Kurds of the Mendan tribe and had a population of 5,616 in 2022.
