= Taban, Kayapınar =

Village in Turkey

Taban
- Neighbourhood
- Location in Turkey
- Coordinates: 38°2′9″N 39°55′5″E
- Country: Turkey
- Province: Diyarbakır
- District: Kayapınar
- Population (2022): 551
- Time zone: UTC+3 (TRT)

Taban is a neighbourhood in the municipality and district of Kayapınar, Diyarbakır Province in Turkey. It is populated by Kurds of the Îzol tribe and had a population of 551 in 2022.
