= Bozyar, Kocaköy =

Village in Turkey

Bozyar
- Neighbourhood
- Location in Turkey
- Coordinates: 38.2057°N 40.4649°E
- Country: Turkey
- Province: Diyarbakır
- District: Kocaköy
- Population (2022): 371
- Time zone: UTC+3 (TRT)

Bozyar (Kurdish: Şêx Omeran) is a neighbourhood in the municipality and district of Kocaköy, Diyarbakır Province in Turkey. It is populated by Kurds and had a population of 371 in 2022.
