= Uyandık, Kayapınar =

Village in Turkey

Uyandık
- Neighbourhood
- Location in Turkey
- Coordinates: 37°59′47″N 40°1′37″E
- Country: Turkey
- Province: Diyarbakır
- District: Kayapınar
- Population (2022): 224
- Time zone: UTC+3 (TRT)

Uyandık (Kurdish: Sakar) is a neighbourhood in the municipality and district of Kayapınar, Diyarbakır Province in Turkey. It is populated by Kurds and had a population of 224 in 2022.
