= Harmanardı, Kayapınar =

Village in Turkey

Harmanardı
- Neighbourhood
- Country: Turkey
- Province: Diyarbakır
- District: Kayapınar
- Population (2022): 196
- Time zone: UTC+3 (TRT)

Harmanardı is a neighbourhood in the municipality and district of Kayapınar, Diyarbakır Province in Turkey. Its population is 196 (2022).
