= Arkbaşı, Kocaköy =

Village in Turkey

Arkbaşı
- Neighbourhood
- Location in Turkey
- Coordinates: 38°16′N 40°34′E
- Country: Turkey
- Province: Diyarbakır
- District: Kocaköy
- Population (2022): 695
- Time zone: UTC+3 (TRT)

Arkbaşı (Kurdish: Mehmedîyan) is a neighbourhood in the municipality and district of Kocaköy, Diyarbakır Province in Turkey. It is populated by Kurds and had a population of 695 in 2022.
