= Gözebaşı, Kocaköy =

Village in Turkey

Gözebaşı
- Neighbourhood
- Location in Turkey
- Coordinates: 38°18′07″N 40°36′53″E
- Country: Turkey
- Province: Diyarbakır
- District: Kocaköy
- Population (2022): 665
- Time zone: UTC+3 (TRT)

Gözebaşı (Kurdish: Rasileyn) is a neighbourhood in the municipality and district of Kocaköy, Diyarbakır Province in Turkey. It is populated by Kurds and had a population of 665 in 2022.
