= Çaytepe, Kocaköy =

Village in Turkey

Çaytepe
- Neighbourhood
- Location in Turkey
- Coordinates: 38°12′40″N 40°30′25″E
- Country: Turkey
- Province: Diyarbakır
- District: Kocaköy
- Population (2022): 2,119
- Time zone: UTC+3 (TRT)

Çaytepe (Kurdish: Qetîn) is a neighbourhood in the municipality and district of Kocaköy, Diyarbakır Province in Turkey. It is populated by Kurds and had a population of 2,119 in 2022.
