= Güleçoba, Kayapınar =

Village in Turkey

Güleçoba
- Neighbourhood
- Location in Turkey
- Coordinates: 37°59′N 39°57′E
- Country: Turkey
- Province: Diyarbakır
- District: Kayapınar
- Population (2022): 2,332
- Time zone: UTC+3 (TRT)

Güleçoba is a neighbourhood in the municipality and district of Kayapınar, Diyarbakır Province in Turkey. It is populated by Kurds of the Îzol tribe and had a population of 2,332 in 2022.
