= Tosunlu, Kayapınar =

Village in Turkey

Tosunlu
- Neighbourhood
- Country: Turkey
- Province: Diyarbakır
- District: Kayapınar
- Population (2022): 194
- Time zone: UTC+3 (TRT)
- Postal code: 21070

Tosunlu is a neighbourhood in the municipality and district of Kayapınar, Diyarbakır Province in Turkey. Its population is 194 (2022).
