= Yeniözerli, Kayapınar =

Village in Turkey

Yeniözerli
- Neighbourhood
- Location in Turkey
- Coordinates: 37°59′N 39°53′E
- Country: Turkey
- Province: Diyarbakır
- District: Kayapınar
- Population (2022): 278
- Time zone: UTC+3 (TRT)

Yeniözerli is a neighbourhood in the municipality and district of Kayapınar, Diyarbakır Province in Turkey. Its population is 278 (2022).
