= Tahir Elçi =

Kurdish lawyer (1966–2015)

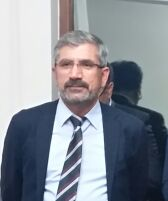

Personal details
- Born: 1966 Cizre, Şırnak Province, Turkey
- Died: 28 November 2015 (aged 48–49) Diyarbakır, Turkey
- Spouse: Türkan Elçi
- Children: 2
- Education: Law
- Alma mater: Dicle University
- Occupation: Lawyer, activist

Tahir Elçi (1966 in Cizre – 28 November 2015) was a Kurdish lawyer and the chairman of Diyarbakır Bar Association.

== Early life and education ==
He went to primary and secondary school in Cizre and graduated from Dicle University in 1991. In 1993 he was a lawyer in Cizre, and a member of the Cizre Bar Association and defending people against the Turkish state at the European Commission of Human Rights (ECHR). Between the 10 December 1993 and 17 February 1994 he was in detention accused of links with the Kurdistan Workers' Party's armed wing.

== Professional career ==
Between 1996 and 2006 he was active at the Diyarbakir Bar association as a manager and in 2012 he was elected its chairman.

On 23 March 2014, he was the lawyer in the Kuşkonar massacre case in the ECHR, in which Turkey was condemned for massacring Kurdish civilians and blaming the PKK. Elçi was detained several times and received death threats after saying the banned PKK should not be regarded as a terrorist organization. In October 2015, Elçi was detained by Turkish authorities and accused of disseminating "terrorist propaganda" after having said in an interview with CNN Türk, that the PKK was not a terrorist organization.

== Death ==
He was killed in the Sur district of Diyarbakir in southeastern Turkey on 28 November 2015. He was shot during a shootout between police and members of the Patriotic Revolutionary Youth Movement (YDG-H), the PKK's youth wing, following a press statement during which he had been calling for an end to violence between the PKK and the Turkish state.

Two members of the YDG-H shot and killed two police officers and fled down the Yenikapı street, where Tahir Elçi was holding the press conference beside the "Four-legged Minaret" of the Sheikh Matar Mosque. As the YDG-H militants ran down the street and past the scene of the press conference, police officers opened fire on them. Elçi was shot in the back of the head during the shootout and the YDG-H militants escaped.

=== Reactions ===
The same day, the International Association of Democratic Lawyers (IADL) and the European Association of Lawyers for Democracy and Human Rights (ELDA) condemned the assassination and called for an independent investigation. The Peoples' Democratic Party (HDP) called the shooting a "planned assassination," and protests erupted in Turkey after Elçi's killing. Elçi's brother Ahmet Elçi was quoted as saying that his brother was "murdered by the state."

Anti-government protests in Turkey with crowds shouting "You can't kill us all" followed the attack.

The HDP leader Selahattin Demirtaş claimed in his interview on IMC TV that according to their investigators, the bullet which killed Tahir Elçi was fired by a Turkish police officer.

=== Investigation ===
Following the murder, Turkish authorities announced the "we aren't ruling out the possibility that a third party directly targeted him." In June 2016, Turkish authorities claimed that a captured militant witnessed PKK militants Uğur Yakışır and Mahsum Gürkhan open fire upon Tahir Elçi the moment he was killed.

In 2019, Forensic Architecture conducted an independent investigation on behalf of the Diyarbakır Bar Association and analyzed the killing. They studied all available videos of the shooting frame by frame, as well as testimonies. They concluded that the fleeing PKK did not shoot at Elçi, the likely fatal shot probably came from 2 identified police officers shooting on the two fleeing PKK and not from the escaping PKK militants. They also point out no medical check was carried on Elçi for 10 minutes after being shot, and none of the policemen involved were ever questioned or debriefed by Turkish authorities, despite the need to do so.

== Personal life ==
Tahir Elci was married to Türkan Elçi and was the father of two daughters.

== See also ==
- Şerafettin Elçi
