= Tepecik, Kocaköy =

Village in Turkey

Tepecik
- Neighbourhood
- Location in Turkey
- Coordinates: 38.2670°N 40.5771°E
- Country: Turkey
- Province: Diyarbakır
- District: Kocaköy
- Population (2022): 620
- Time zone: UTC+3 (TRT)

Tepecik (Kurdish: Tepecug) is a neighbourhood in the municipality and district of Kocaköy, Diyarbakır Province in Turkey. It is populated by Kurds and had a population of 620 in 2022.
