= Tişo, Kayapınar =

Village in Turkey

Tişo
- Neighbourhood
- Location in Turkey
- Coordinates: 38°05′N 39°57′E
- Country: Turkey
- Province: Diyarbakır
- District: Kayapınar
- Population (2022): 110
- Time zone: UTC+3 (TRT)

Tişo (formerly: Devedurağı) is a neighbourhood in the municipality and district of Kayapınar, Diyarbakır Province in Turkey. Its population is 110 (2022).
