= Esentepe, Kayapınar =

Village in Turkey

Esentepe
- Neighbourhood
- Country: Turkey
- Province: Diyarbakır
- District: Kayapınar
- Population (2022): 474
- Time zone: UTC+3 (TRT)

Esentepe is a neighbourhood in the municipality and district of Kayapınar, Diyarbakır Province in Turkey. Its population is 474 (2022).
