= Gözegöl, Kayapınar =

Village in Diyarbakır Province, Turkey

Gözegöl
- Neighbourhood
- Location in Turkey
- Coordinates: 37°59′3″N 40°3′4″E
- Country: Turkey
- Province: Diyarbakır
- District: Kayapınar
- Population (2022): 293
- Time zone: UTC+3 (TRT)

Gözegöl is a neighbourhood in the municipality and district of Kayapınar, Diyarbakır Province in Turkey. It is populated by Kurds and had a population of 293 in 2022.
