= Şaklat, Kocaköy =

Village in Turkey

Şaklat
- Neighbourhood
- Location in Turkey
- Coordinates: 38°19′35″N 40°28′7″E
- Country: Turkey
- Province: Diyarbakır
- District: Kocaköy
- Population (2022): 750
- Time zone: UTC+3 (TRT)

Şaklat (Kurdish: Şeqlat) is a neighbourhood in the municipality and district of Kocaköy, Diyarbakır Province in Turkey. It is populated by Kurds and had a population of 750 in 2022.
