= Beneklitaş, Kayapınar =

Village in Diyarbakır Province, Turkey

Beneklitaş
- Neighbourhood
- Location in Turkey
- Coordinates: 38°1′16″N 40°4′37″E
- Country: Turkey
- Province: Diyarbakır
- District: Kayapınar
- Population (2022): 413
- Time zone: UTC+3 (TRT)

Beneklitaş is a neighbourhood in the municipality and district of Kayapınar, Diyarbakır Province in Turkey. It is populated by Kurds and had a population of 413 in 2022.
