= Cumhuriyet, Kayapınar =

Village in Turkey

Cumhuriyet
- Neighbourhood
- Location in Turkey
- Coordinates: 37.943°N 39.978°E
- Country: Turkey
- Province: Diyarbakır
- District: Kayapınar
- Population (2022): 1,158
- Time zone: UTC+3 (TRT)

Cumhuriyet is a neighbourhood in the municipality and district of Kayapınar, Diyarbakır Province in Turkey. Its population is 1,158 (2022).
