= Feridun Çelik =

Kurdish politician

Mayor of Diyarbakır
- In office 18 April 1999 – 2004
- Succeeded by: Osman Baydemir

Personal details
- Born: 1966 (age 59–60) Kulp, Diyarbakır, Turkey
- Party: HADEP; DEHAP
- Education: Dicle University
- Occupation: Lawyer

Feridun Çelik (born 1966, Kulp, Diyarbakır) is a Kurdish–Turkish a former Mayor of Diyarbakır and politician of the People's Democracy Party (HADEP) and Democratic People's Party (DEHAP).

== Biography ==
He studied law at the Dicle University, from where he graduated in 1987. He began his political career at the People's Labour Party (HEP) and was elected party chair for Diyarbakirır province for the HADEP in 1997. Feridun Çelik was also a lawyer of Abdullah Öcalan and was refused the permission to visit him after he was captured and brought to Turkey. As the party chair of HADEP, he was shortly arrested in 1999. But in the same year, with only 33 years of age, he was elected Mayor of Diyarbakır. During his term as Mayor, he advocated for an end of the Kurdish Turkish conflict, and supported the idea of the different nations of Turkey living peacefully together. He supported Kurdish rights and enabled that the Newroz festivities, which are an important festivity in the Kurdish culture, were held legally after he asked permission to hold them from the Governor from Diyarbakir. In February 2000 he was arrested together with the mayors of Siirt and Bingöl, following their meeting with European politicians where they discussed the status of Kurdish rights in Turkey. They were accused of hiring relatives of PKK members in their municipalities. After a few days, he was released with the other mayors. Their arrest caused widespread opposition by politicians of the European Union and the Council of Europe, who accused the Turkish Prime Minister Bülent Ecevit to have encouraged the arrest of elected politicians. In March 2003 the HADEP was banned, accused of supporting the Kurdistan Workers' Party (PKK), and Çelik joined the DEHAP. In 2004 Çelik was unsure if to launch a bid for to be the Mayor of Diyarbakır, he wanted to run as an independent with the support of the PKK and against the will of his own party who chose Osman Baydemir to be the candidate for the Mayorship of Diyarbakır. After some quarrels, he withdrew his candidacy and Baydemir was free to become the candidate. Following he was a part of the team of attorneys of Öcalan. He was detained on the 26 May 2017, due to an investigation into his activities in the Democratic Society Congress, but released pending trial on the 14 June of the same year.
