= Suçıktı, Kocaköy =

Village in Turkey

Suçıktı
- Neighbourhood
- Location in Turkey
- Coordinates: 38.1949°N 40.5785°E
- Country: Turkey
- Province: Diyarbakır
- District: Kocaköy
- Population (2022): 318
- Time zone: UTC+3 (TRT)

Suçıktı (Kurdish: Tiltapan) is a neighbourhood in the municipality and district of Kocaköy, Diyarbakır Province in Turkey. It is populated by Kurds and had a population of 318 in 2022.
