= Keklik, Kayapınar =

Village in Turkey

Keklik
- Neighbourhood
- Country: Turkey
- Province: Diyarbakır
- District: Kayapınar
- Population (2022): 130
- Time zone: UTC+3 (TRT)

Keklik is a neighbourhood in the municipality and district of Kayapınar, Diyarbakır Province in Turkey. Its population is 130 (2022).
