= Şenal Sarıhan =

Turkish politician

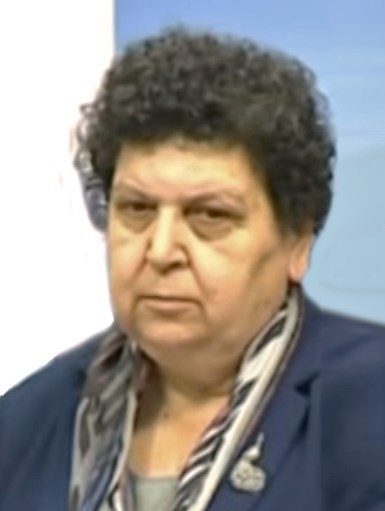

Member of the Grand National Assembly
- In office 7 June 2015 – 24 June 2018
- Constituency: Ankara (II) (June 2015, Nov 2015)

Personal details
- Born: 17 February 1948 (age 78)
- Party: Republican People's Party
- Occupation: Lawyer
- Known for: Human rights activism
- Awards: Robert F. Kennedy Human Rights Award (1997)

Şenal Sarıhan (born 17 February 1948) is a Turkish attorney, feminist, and human rights activist. She won the Robert F. Kennedy Human Rights Award in 1997, sharing it with fellow attorney Sezgin Tanrıkulu. An award given each year to an individual whose courageous activism is at the heart of the human rights movement and in the spirit of Robert F. Kennedy's vision and legacy.

== Biography ==
Originally a teacher, Sarıhan was active in the Turkish Teachers Association, joining its executive committee in 1967 and writing pro-union articles for its newspaper. She was sentenced to twenty-two years in prison for these writings in 1971, but was released following a 1974 change of government. After her release, she began work on a law degree, graduating in 1976. She specialized in human rights cases, defending activists and intellectuals. In 1980, she was again imprisoned for "espousing antistate views" in her newspaper writing, this time for thirty-five days.

In 1986, she founded the Contemporary Lawyers Association, becoming its president. Ten years later, she founded the Contemporary Women's Association to protest for women's rights. In 1998, she led calls for the resignation of cabinet minister Işılay Saygın after Saygın defended the practice of virginity testing in an interview.

Sarıhan was an active opponent of several proposals of the Prime Minister Tayyip Erdoğan government, arguing that they were attacks on women's rights. She opposed an anti-adultery law in 2004, stating concern that it would primarily be used against women; In 2007, she led protests against his party, expressing fears that it would seek to institute Sharia law. the plans were later dropped. The following year, she organized a rally of around 40,000 people to protest the lifting of a ban on head scarves in universities. She is a member of the Republican People's Party (CHP).

She was removed from the CHP candidate lists for the 2018 Elections.
