= Gökçen, Kocaköy =

Village in Turkey

Gökçen
- Neighbourhood
- Location in Turkey
- Coordinates: 38.3026°N 40.5417°E
- Country: Turkey
- Province: Diyarbakır
- District: Kocaköy
- Population (2022): 696
- Time zone: UTC+3 (TRT)

Gökçen (Kurdish: Dêrûn) is a neighbourhood in the municipality and district of Kocaköy, Diyarbakır Province in Turkey. It is populated by Kurds and had a population of 696 in 2022.
