= Kamuran Tanhan =

Turkish politician (born 1979)

Kamuran Tanhan (born 1979, Nusaybin, Turkey) is a lawyer and politician and since June 2023 a member of the Grand National Assembly of Turkey for the Green Left Party (YSP). He was the lawyer of the former Mayor of Nusaybin Sara Kaya and also the artist Zehra Dogan

== Early life and education ==
Kamuran Tanhan was born in 1979 in Nusaybin where he attended primary school and graduated from high school. He eventually became a member of the Bar Association of Mardin. In 2017 he was the lawyer to the former Mayor of Nusaybin Sara Kaya and of the artist Zehra Dogan.

== Political career ==
In the parliamentary elections of May 2023, he was elected to the Grand National Assembly of Turkey, representing Mardin for the YSP. In the second round of the presidential elections, he reported about supporters of the Justice and Development Party attacking an election official.

== Personal life ==
He is married and has two children. His uncle is Mehmet Tanhan, the former Mayor of Nusaybin and politician of the Democratic Society Party (DTP).
