= Cankatran, Kayapınar =

Village in Diyarbakır Province, Turkey

Cankatran
- Neighbourhood
- Location in Turkey
- Coordinates: 38°0′10″N 40°4′46″E
- Country: Turkey
- Province: Diyarbakır
- District: Kayapınar
- Population (2022): 1,171
- Time zone: UTC+3 (TRT)

Cankatran is a neighbourhood in the municipality and district of Kayapınar, Diyarbakır Province in Turkey. It is populated by Kurds and had a population of 1,171 in 2022.
