= Karayakup, Kayapınar =

Village in Turkey

Karayakup
- Neighbourhood
- Location in Turkey
- Coordinates: 37°54′52″N 39°51′24″E
- Country: Turkey
- Province: Diyarbakır
- District: Kayapınar
- Population (2022): 279
- Time zone: UTC+3 (TRT)

Karayakup is a neighbourhood in the municipality and district of Kayapınar, Diyarbakır Province in Turkey. It is populated by Kurds of the Îzol tribe and had a population of 279 in 2022.
