= Yazıköy, Kocaköy =

Village in Turkey

Yazıköy
- Neighbourhood
- Location in Turkey
- Coordinates: 38°18′47″N 40°29′46″E
- Country: Turkey
- Province: Diyarbakır
- District: Kocaköy
- Population (2022): 1,271
- Time zone: UTC+3 (TRT)

Yazıköy (Kurdish: Hawrê) is a neighbourhood in the municipality and district of Kocaköy, Diyarbakır Province in Turkey. It is populated by Kurds and had a population of 1,271 in 2022.
