= Anbar, Kocaköy =

Village in Turkey

Anbar
- Neighbourhood
- Location in Turkey
- Coordinates: 38.2673°N 40.4562°E
- Country: Turkey
- Province: Diyarbakır
- District: Kocaköy
- Population (2022): 550
- Time zone: UTC+3 (TRT)

Anbar (Kurdish: Embar) is a neighbourhood in the municipality and district of Kocaköy, Diyarbakır Province in Turkey. It is populated by Kurds and had a population of 550 in 2022.
