= Cücük, Kayapınar =

Village in Diyarbakır Province, Turkey

Cücük
- Neighbourhood
- Location in Turkey
- Coordinates: 37°57′42″N 40°9′59″E
- Country: Turkey
- Province: Diyarbakır
- District: Kayapınar
- Population (2022): 399
- Time zone: UTC+3 (TRT)

Cücük (Kurdish: Cucuk) is a neighbourhood in the municipality and district of Kayapınar, Diyarbakır Province in Turkey. It is populated by Kurds and had a population of 399 in 2022.
