= Bozbağlar, Kocaköy =

Village in Turkey

Bozbağlar
- Neighbourhood
- Location in Turkey
- Coordinates: 38°13′39″N 40°35′39″E
- Country: Turkey
- Province: Diyarbakır
- District: Kocaköy
- Population (2022): 538
- Time zone: UTC+3 (TRT)

Bozbağlar (Kurdish: Quçike) is a neighbourhood in the municipality and district of Kocaköy, Diyarbakır Province in Turkey. It is populated by Kurds and had a population of 538 in 2022.
