= Osman Baydemir =

Kurdish politician (born 1971)

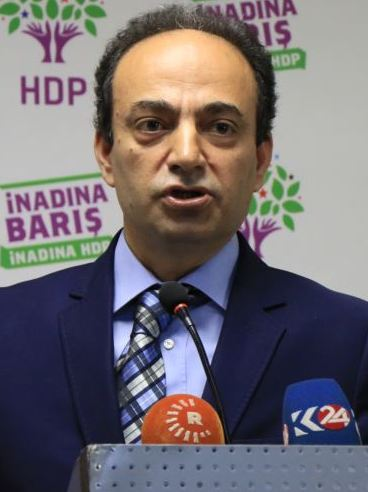
- Baydemir, 2017

Mayor of Diyarbakır
- In office 28 March 2004 – 30 March 2014
- Preceded by: Feridun Çelik
- Succeeded by: Gülten Kışanak

Member of the Grand National Assembly of Turkey
- In office 23 June 2015 – 16 May 2018
- Constituency: Diyarbakır (June 2015, November 2015)

Personal details
- Born: 6 June 1971 (age 55) Diyarbakır, Turkey

Osman Baydemir (born 6 June 1971) is a Kurdish politician, lawyer and human rights activist. He was the mayor of his home town of Diyarbakır from 2004 to 2014. He was a member of the Grand National Assembly of Turkey for the Peace and Democracy Party (BDP) and also the Peoples Democratic Party (HDP). “He is widely known for his remark in the Turkish Parliament in 2017, when — after being asked where ‘Kurdistan’ was — he touched his heart and replied, ‘Here is the Kurdistan.’

== Early life and education ==
Osman Baydemir was born in Diyarbakır. Baydemir graduated from the Law Faculty of the Dicle University in Diyarbakır. In 1995 he became the chair of the Diyarbakır branch of the independent Human Rights Association. Between 1995 and 2002 he was also a board member and became vice-president of the association. In February 1999 he became one of the first lawyers who volunteered to defend Abdullah Öcalan, the leader of the Kurdistan Workers' Party (PKK). In 2001 he became a founding member of the Human Rights Foundation of Turkey (TİHV).

== Political career ==
In the general elections in 2002, he was the candidate of the Democratic People's Party (DEHAP), but the party failed to reach the 10% election threshold. In 2003, Baydemir spent 6 months in the United States, to improve his English. In the local elections in 2004, he was elected mayor of Diyarbakır. As Mayor of Diyarbakır he became a member of the World Federation of United Cities for which he toured several capitals in the world. He also held speeches about the difficulties Kurds face in Turkey to the European Parliament. In the election campaign for the local election of 2009, he had a prominent opposition of the candidate of the Justice and Development Party (AKP) and its leader Recep Tayyip Erdogan. Baydemir won the elections and declared Diyarbakir as the DTP's castle. Soon after the victory in the elections of 2009, he was sentenced to ten months imprisonment for calling the Kurdistan Workers' Party (PKK) "guerrilla" which a Turkish court viewed as propaganda in favor of the PKK. In the general elections of 2014 he was elected a Member of Parliament representing the BDP for Sanliurfa. As an MP, he was a well perceivable defender of the Kurdish language and minority in Turkey and was banned for two sessions of the Turkish parliament for using the word Kurdistan, which is forbidden to use in the Turkish parliament. Osman Baydemir then filed an appeal before the Constitutional Court which argued it had no authority of parliamentarian penalties Following, Baydemir appealed to the European Court of Human Rights (ECHR) over his temporary expulsion, who in June 2023, condemned Turkey to pay Baydemir a penalty of almost 17'000 Euros.

=== Prosecution ===
As a human rights activist and as a politician, Osman Baydemir has been subjected to persecution on various levels. According to a report of Amnesty International of 12 February 2004 there were 200 court cases against him for his human rights activities. The daily Radikal reported on 11 July 2006 that during the last two years a total of 129 investigations against him had been conducted. In June 2001 Amnesty International issued an urgent action on his behalf. After the assassination of Armenian journalist Hrant Dink in January 2007 Osman Baydemir was among several people who received death threats.

Some or the court cases against Osman Baydemir include:

- In May 2006 Osman Baydemir was charged with for providing an ambulance of the municipality for the transport of a corpse. In September 2006 Osman Baydemir was acquitted.
- Osman Baydemir and 55 other mayors of the Democratic Society Party (DTP) were indicted because in December 2005 they signed a petition to the Danish Prime Minister Anders Fogh Rasmussen urging him not to close the Kurdish television station Roj TV. They were charged with supporting the Kurdistan Workers' Party (PKK). The trial started in September 2006 and in April 2007 the prosecutor asked for sentences of 15 years' imprisonment for 52 mayors.
- He was prosecuted for violating a Turkish law prohibiting the use of letters not in the Turkish alphabet when he sent out a New Year's greeting in Kurdish which included the letter "W". On 19 April 2007, Diyarbakır Peace Court No. 2 dropped the charges since the Ministry of Justice had not permitted that such a case be heard.
- He was charged with forbidden propaganda for having referred to the PKK as the "armed Kurdish opposition", but was acquitted in December 2009 as it was seen as freedom of thought by a court in Diyarbakır.
- In October 2017 Baydemir was sentenced to 1 year, 5 months and 15 days of imprisonment for insulting an "on-duty government employee" after he called three police officers "fascists and low-lives". The verdict was confirmed in April 2018, following which he was expelled from parliament.
- On 10 December 2018 Ahval news agency reported he was sentenced to 18 month of prison for violating the law of demonstrations and meetings.

On the 17 March 2021, the State Prosecutor to the Court of Cassation Bekir Şahin filed a lawsuit in front of the Constitutional Court demanding for Baydemir and 686 other HDP politicians a five-year ban to engage in politics together with a closure of the HDP due to alleged organizational links with the PKK.

== Personal life ==
In May 2005, he married Reyhan Yalçındağ, the deputy chair of the TIHV. On 23 April 2006 their son Mirzanyar was born. After his expulsion of the Turkish parliament he left Turkey and went into exile to London, United Kingdom.
