= Boyunlu, Kocaköy =

Village in Turkey

Boyunlu
- Neighbourhood
- Location in Turkey
- Coordinates: 38°19′06″N 40°38′12″E
- Country: Turkey
- Province: Diyarbakır
- District: Kocaköy
- Population (2022): 412
- Time zone: UTC+3 (TRT)

Boyunlu (Kurdish: Benî) is a neighbourhood in the municipality and district of Kocaköy, Diyarbakır Province in Turkey. It is populated by Kurds and had a population of 412 in 2022.
