= Rüzgar Erkoçlar =

Turkish actor and model

Onur Rüzgar Erkoçlar (born 26 March 1986) is a Turkish former actor and model.

Erkoçlar debuted with TV adverts as a child. In 2002, he achieved national recognition after an advert of Molped, a sanitary napkin brand. After the advert's popularity, he started to play in the series such as Seni Yaşatacağım, Bütün Çocuklarım, and Emret Komutanım.

In February 2013, Erkoçlar came out as a trans man and debuted his new image and name "Rüzgar" (meaning wind). The award winning 2022 documentary Blue ID narrates the story of his transition and struggles for state recognition.

== Filmography ==
Movies
Year	Title	Role	Notes
2006	Emret Komutanım Şah Mat	Fato	
Television
Year	Title	Role	Notes
2002	Seni Yaşatacağım	Özlem	
2004	Bütün Çocuklarım	Irmak Kıroğlu	
2005–2008	Emret Komutanım	Foto Fato	
2008	Elif	Yağmur	
2008	Üvey Aile	Özlem Orakçı	
2009	Hesaplaşma	Defne	
2010	Maskeli Balo	Zehra	
2010	Çakıl Taşları	Zeynep	
2012	Yamak Ahmet	Anna	2nd season

== Personal life ==
Erkoçlar married Tuğba Beyazoğlu in 2017. His father is Engin Erkoçlar, his mother is Sema Erkoçlar, and his brother, Görkem Batu Erkoçlar, is also transgender.
