= Sabite Ekinci =

Turkish film director and politician

Sabite Ekinci (born 1970, Varto, Turkey) is a Turkish film director, teacher and politician of Kurdish descent. She has been the mayor of Varto and her documentary Corpses without souls won an award at the Antalya Golden Orange Film Festival.

== Early life and education ==
Ekinci was born in Varto, where she attended high school. After having completed her studied at the Gazi University she became a teacher. She moved to Istanbul in 1998. In 2005 to 2006 she studied cinematography at the Müjdat Gezen Art center.

== Professional career ==
She was a teacher for eighteen years in several cities in Turkey. She produced a documentary about Cihan Sincar, the Mayor of Kiziltepe and widow of Democracy Party (DEP) MP Mehmet Sincar. Her documentary "Bodies without souls" (Turkish language Bedensiz Ruhlar) which treats the experiences of six prostitutes received the best documentary award at the Antalya Golden Orange Film Festival in 2011. For the documentary she attempted to shoot in brothels, but when their cameras were detected the crew was threatened and she had to abandon the project of filming inside brothels. During the shoot, she was pregnant with her second child which also affected her as she learned that prostitutes also have children. Some were given away for adoption and one prostitute had three daughters who also became prostitutes.

== Political career ==
In the local elections of 2014, as a candidate for the Peace and Democracy Party (BDP) she was elected as the mayor of Varto with over 63% of the votes. In November 2016, she was arrested for terror related offenses and causing damage to the municipality and was replaced by a state-appointed trustee. Having initially been imprisoned in Muş, she was transferred to Sincan prison in Ankara.

== Personal life ==
Ekinci has two children and is married.
