= Rojda Nazlıer =

Kurdish politician in Turkey

Rojda Nazlıer is a Kurdish politician of the Peoples' Democratic Party (HDP) from Turkey. She was elected as the mayor of Kocaköy, in March 2019 but was removed from her post in October 2019 on grounds of an investigation in terrorism related charges.

== Early life and education ==
Rojda Nazlıer was born in Lice in the Diyarbakir province, where she attended primary and secondary school. Before becoming mayor, she worked for several Non Governmental Organizations focused on women related issues.

== Political career ==
She was elected the mayor of the Kocaköy in the municipal elections of March 2019. After an investigation on terror-related charges was opened, she was dismissed by the Turkish Ministry of the Interior on 21 October 2020 and a state-appointed trustee assumed the post of an acting mayor. In her trial, testimonies of secret witnesses who accused her of being a member of the People's Defence Forces (HPG) and allegedly having transformed the buildings in her possession into centers of the HPG were taken into account. Besides, she was accused of having attended the Newroz festivities and having taken part in a memorial service for the hunger striker Zülküf Hezen. In October 2019, she was transferred from a women's prison in Diyarbakir in Turkish Kurdistan, to the women's prison of Kayseri in the centre of Turkey. On 14 December 2020, she was sentenced to nine years in prison for being a member of a terrorist organization. On the 17 March 2021, the State Prosecutor for the Court of Cassation in Turkey Bekir Şahin filed a lawsuit before the Constitutional Court, demanded for Nazlıer a five-year ban for a political participation within the HDP closure case.
