= Baykara, Kayapınar =

Village in Turkey

Baykara
- Neighbourhood
- Location in Turkey
- Coordinates: 38.0791°N 39.8953°E
- Country: Turkey
- Province: Diyarbakır
- District: Kayapınar
- Population (2022): 429
- Time zone: UTC+3 (TRT)

Baykara is a neighbourhood in the municipality and district of Kayapınar, Diyarbakır Province in Turkey. Its population is 429 (2022).
