= Rezan Zuğurlu =

Turkish politician

Former Mayor of Lice
- In office April 2014 – February 2017
- Preceded by: Fikriye Aydın

Personal details
- Born: 1988 or 1989 (age 37–38)
- Party: Peace and Democracy Party
- Occupation: Student

Rezan Zuğurlu was mayor of Lice District in Diyarbakır Province, southeastern Turkey. She is a member of the Peace and Democracy Party (BDP).

== Personal life ==
Zuğurlu was born into a family of Kurdish activists and grew up in southeastern Turkey during an armed uprising for political rights among the Kurdish people. She considers herself a feminist and hopes her position as mayor would help better the lives of women in the district. She stated that she gets a feeling of solidarity with Berivan Elif Kiliç, Mayor of the town of Kocakoy, who was married off at the age of 15 into an abusive household, as well as Gultan Kisanak, female mayor of Diyarbakir. She was a student of Radio and Television Broadcasting and attended night-school after her day's work.

== Prosecution ==
At the age of 22, Zuğurlu was accused of having protested in solidarity with several Kurdish prisoners which resulted in her getting arrested and sentenced to a 4 years 2 months prison term, of which she spent 13 months in pretrial detention. The judges reasoned that her nose and mouth profile would match the one of a protester identified as the one who threw stones towards Turkish authorities. She was released due to an appeal and two years after being released from prison, in March 2014, she ran for public office, for the post of mayor.

== Political career ==
At the age of 25, she became the youngest mayor in Turkey, winning nearly 90% of the votes in the local elections in March 2014 and assumed office in April 2014, Zuğurlu was among several female mayor candidates fielded by the party at that time, which also included 27-year-old Leyla İmret, who was elected as in Cizre, in Şırnak province. In February 2017 she was dismissed as mayor and a trustee was appointed instead. On 17 August 2017, she was arrested due to the anterior sentence that came into effect. In September she was transferred from Diyarbakır E Type Prison to the Van T Type Prison.
