= Kaldırım, Kayapınar =

Village in Turkey

Kaldırım
- Neighbourhood
- Location in Turkey
- Coordinates: 37°57′04″N 39°49′37″E
- Country: Turkey
- Province: Diyarbakır
- District: Kayapınar
- Population (2022): 2,110
- Time zone: UTC+3 (TRT)

Kaldırım (also: Kaldırımköy) is a neighbourhood in the municipality and district of Kayapınar, Diyarbakır Province in Turkey. Its population is 2,110 (2022).
