= Sultantepe, Kayapınar =

Village in Turkey

Sultantepe
- Neighbourhood
- Country: Turkey
- Province: Diyarbakır
- District: Kayapınar
- Population (2022): 177
- Time zone: UTC+3 (TRT)

Sultantepe is a neighbourhood in the municipality and district of Kayapınar, Diyarbakır Province in Turkey. Its population is 177 (2022).
