= İlkay Akkaya =

Turkish singer (born 1964)

İlkay Akkaya (born 26 May 1964 in Istanbul) is a Turkish singer and member of the Turkish music group Grup Kızılırmak.

== Personal life ==
Ilkay Akkaya was born on 26 May 1964 in Istanbul into a family with roots in Antalya. Her father was a civil servant from Manavgat and her mother from Muğla. She is one of four children.

She graduated from the Marmara University in Istanbul. After university, she continued her musical training at the Istanbul University State Conservatory, where she studied vocal performance and classical techniques. Akkaya also took private singing lessons to further refine her voice.

== Career ==
Akkaya began the first step of her music career when she became a member of the music group Grup Yorum in 1987. In 1988, she left Grup Yorum together with Tuncay Akdoğan. On 10 January 1990, she founded the group Kızılırmak together with Tuncay Akdoğan and İsmail İlknur. Kızılırmak is currently one of the most famous Alevi groups; it has given concerts throughout Europe. By April 2008, the group had released 13 albums.

During her time with Kızılırmak, Akkaya also worked on her solo career. From 1990 to 1992, she appeared at the Birlik Theatre in Ankara, where she played the role of Ballihan in the play Pir Sultan Abdal.

In 1991, she composed the film music for the film Bir Küçük Bulut. In 2003 she played in the theatre play "Talan" directed by Zafer Diper. In May 2005, she played in the theatre play "Nâzım Hikmet – Şeyh Bedreddin Destanı". The group Kızılırmak also wrote the music for these theatre plays. İlkay Akkaya still gives many concerts in Europe today. Akkaya has worked with singers such as Erdal Erzincan and Hasret Gültekin.

== Albums with Grup Yorum ==
- 1987: Haziranda Ölmek Zor/Berivan
- 1988: Türkülerle

== Albums with Grup Kızılırmak ==
- 1990: Pir Sultan Abdal
- 1991: Ölüme de Tilili
- 1991: Gidenlerin Ardından
- 1992: Aynı Göğün Ezgisi
- 1993: Güneşin Olsun
- 1994: Anadolu Türküleri
- 1995: Çığlık
- 1996: Rüzgarla Gelen
- 1997: Günde Dün
- 1998: Sır
- 1999: Gölge
- 2001: Figan
- 2005: Yılkı

== Solo albums ==
- 1999: Kül
- 2001: Unutma
- 2003: Yine
- 2005: Yalnız
- 2010: Gelmedin Diye
- 2013: Umut
- 2015: Hayat
