= Engin Ardıç =

Turkish writer and newspaper columnist (1952–2023)

- Born: 1 February 1952; Trabzon, Turkey
- Died: 27 May 2023 (aged 71); Bağcılar, Istanbul, Turkey
- Education: Galatasaray High School; Boğaziçi University
- Occupations: Journalist, columnist
- Years active: 1970–2023
- Employer(s): Sabah, BBC Turkish

Engin Ardıç (1 February 1952 – 27 May 2023) was a Turkish writer and a newspaper columnist for the Sabah newspaper. He also worked as a television commentator in the 1990s.

== Biography ==
Ardıç was born on 1 February 1952 in Trabzon, a coastal city on the northern Black Sea shore of Anatolia. After moving to Istanbul at an early age due to his parents' jobs, he spent his childhood mostly in Beşiktaş. In 1959, he was admitted to the elementary section of Galatasaray High School.

Following his graduation from Galatasaray High School, Ardıç entered Boğaziçi University and graduated with a degree in political science. Because of his interest in theater, his first writings in the early 1970s were mostly theater reviews for the magazine Tiyatro (Theater). He also wrote literary critiques in Yeni Dergi (New Magazine), Politika (Politics) and Cumhuriyet (The Republic). Until his death, he was a columnist for the Sabah newspaper.

His writing style often contained street slang. He had been accused of being a misogynist and of promoting hate speech, charges that he had denied. Ardıç died in Bağcılar, Istanbul on 27 May 2023, at the age of 71.

== Bibliography ==
- "Doğru Söyleyeni Dokuz Köyden..." (1988)
- "Kadın Suretleri" (1989)
- "İslâm Teksas'ta" (1989)
- "Şengül Hamamı" (1989)
- "Mustafa Kemal Sizin Gibi Kıro Değildi!" (1990)
- "Daktilo Konçertoları" (1990)
- "Turkobarok" (1991)
- "Teğel Teğel Hüzün" (1991)
- "Burjuvazi Şeyediyor Haa..." (1999)
