= Dicle University =

Public university in Diyarbakır, Turkey

- Dicle Üniversitesi
- Type: Public
- Established: 1962 / 1974
- Rector: Kamuran Eronat
- Academic staff: 1700
- Administrative staff: 3,500
- Students: 33,000
- Location: Diyarbakır, Turkey; 37.9192°N 40.2680°E
- Campus: Rural
- Website: www.dicle.edu.tr

Dicle University (Turkish: Dicle Üniversitesi, Kurdish: Zanîngeha Dîcleyê) is a public university located in Diyarbakır, Turkey, and one of the largest higher education institution. Vocational schools are located in Ergani, Çermik, Çüngüş, Bismil, and Silvan

== History ==
Dicle University's early history is linked with Diyarbakır Eğitim Enstitüsü which was chartered on 1962. The Faculty of Medicine, which was opened in 1966 as a part of Ankara University, forms the nucleus of the present Dicle University. With the opening of the Faculty of Art and Sciences in 1974, Dicle University was officially founded including two faculties. The Faculty of Dentistry was founded in 1976 and the Faculty of Agriculture in 1981. The name Diyarbakir University was changed to Dicle University in 1982. The Faculty of Engineering and Architecture, The Faculty of Law, The Faculty of Education, three graduate schools and five schools were opened as new institutions of the University.

Today there are 11 faculties, four schools, 11 vocational schools, three graduate schools, one state conservatory, and eight research and application centres under the administration of the university.

Dicle University is at the centre of the GAP.

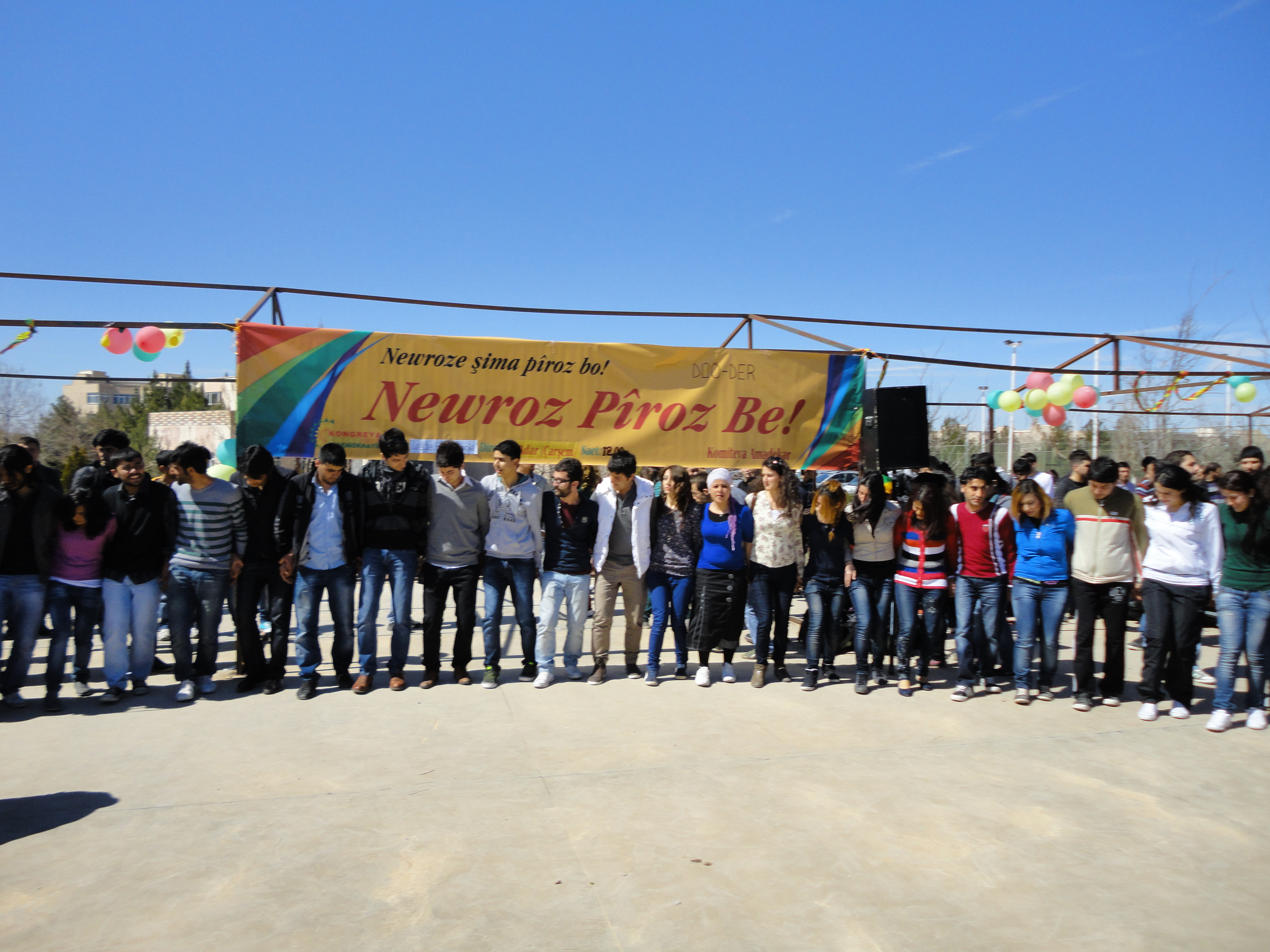
Students celebrating Newroz

== Faculties ==
- Ziya Gökalp Faculty of Education
- Faculty of Science
- Faculty of Literature
- Faculty of Dentistry
- Faculty of Law
- Faculty of Medicine
- Faculty of Veterinary Medicine
- Faculty of Agriculture
- Faculty of Engineering
- Faculty of Architecture
- Faculty of Theology
- Faculty of Economics and Administrative Sciences
- Faculty of Communication

== Graduate schools ==
- Graduate School of Social Sciences
- Graduate School of Health Sciences
- Graduate School of Science

== Vocational schools ==
- Atatürk School of Health
- School of Physical Education and Sports
- School of Civil Aviation
- School of Foreign Language
- Diyarbakir Vocational School
- Bismil Vocational School
- Çermik Vocational School
- Çüngüş Vocational School
- Ergani Vocational School
- Silvan Vocational School
- Atatürk Vocational School of Health Sciences.

== Research centers ==
- Continuing Education Center
- Atatürk's principles and reforms Research Center
- Social Research Center
- Environmental Issues Application and Research Center
- GAP Application and Research Center
- Solar Energy Application and Research Center
- Liver Diseases Application and Research Center
- Psychological and Social Counselling Application and Research Center
- Medical Sciences Application and Research Center
- Natural Disasters Research Center

== Notable alumni ==
- Osman Baydemir - politician, former mayor of Diyarbakır
- Ayla Akat Ata - politician
- Tahir Elçi - lawyer
- Feridun Çelik, politician, former mayor of Diyarbakır
- Sara Kaya, former mayor of Nusaybin
- Ebru Günay, politician and spokeswoman of the Peoples' Democratic Party (HDP)

== See also ==
- List of universities in Turkey
- Diyarbakır
- Tigris
