= Zülküf Karatekin =

Turkish-Kurdish politician (born 1965)

Zülküf Kayapinar

Mayor of Kayapınar
- In office 2004–2009

Personal details
- Born: 1965 (age 60–61) Kirkpinar
- Party: Democratic Society Party (DTP)
- Education: Engineering and Architecture, Selçuk University

Zülküf Karatekin (born 1965, Kırkpınar, Diyarbakır) is a Turkish engineer and politician of Kurdish descent. He was a member of the political parties Social Democratic Populist Party (SHP), the Democratic Society Party (DTP). He was elected the Mayor of Kayapinar and imprisoned during his second term in 2009.

== Education ==
He completed his primary school in Kırkpınar village and high school in Diyarbakır. in 1986, Karatekin graduated from in Engineering and Architecture department from the Selçuk University in Konya.

== Professional career ==
He started to work at Iller Bank in 1987. He was elected as a Member of the Board of Directors to the Chamber of Civil Engineers of the Union of Chambers of Turkish Engineers and Architects (TMMOB) in 1996 and as the chairman of it in 1998. He was re-elected as the chairman for three terms. He was exiled to Kastamonu in 1999 and later his employment contract was terminated by Iller Bank.

== Political career ==
In the 28 March 2004 elections, Karatekin was elected as the Mayor of Kayapinar representing the SHP. In 2005, Karatekin joined the DTP. During his tenure, he was investigated for having ordered to build a swimming pool in the shape of a Kurdistan in 2007. The pool was located in the Medya park, which was inaugurated in June 2007. Another park inaugurated during her mayorship was the ... Park, which did not have a name because its original name Rosna, was rejected by the State-Appointed Governorship.

Karatekin was arrested in December 2009 due to suspected links to the Kurdistan Communities Union (KCK). During his detention he claimed that all of Diyarbakir was part of the KCK and that they wouldn't be able to change this by detaining him. He was tried together with other politicians of his party in the so-called KCK-trials and released in July 2014. Following his release was active in the Peoples' Democratic Party (HDP). Later he decided to leave Turkey in 2020 and go to exile into Austria. He arrived in Fieberbrunn in Tyrol, where he applied for asylum.

== In media ==
He was one of the interviewed politicians for the documentary Prison or Exile.
