= Sara Kaya =

Kurdish politician from Turkey

Mayor of Nusaybin
- In office 2014–2016

Personal details
- Born: 1 January 1970 (age 56) Nusaybin, Mardin, Turkey
- Citizenship: Turkish
- Party: Peace and Democracy Party
- Education: Anadolu University

Sara Kaya (born 1 January 1970 in Nusaybin) is a Kurdish politician from Turkey and a former mayor of Nusaybin. She is currently being held at the Tarsus prison in Mersin.

== Education and professional career ==
Sara Kaya was born to Kurdish parents in Nusaybin, Midyat where she attended primary and secondary education. She graduated in construction engineering at the Dicle University in Diyarbakir and later also in Business Administration from the Anadolu University in Eskişehir. She was employed for nineteen years at the Municipality of Nusaybin during which she acted for several years the speaker of the workers union of the municipality.

== Political career ==
During the local elections of 2014, she was elected Mayor of Nusaybin representing the Peace and Democracy Party (BDP). Her tenure was marked by the declaration of self governance and the subsequent curfews in Nusaybin. She has been described as a supporter of the Yazidi as well as a feminist.

=== Prosecution ===
She was detained on the 28 August 2015 for having announced the city would govern itself and later transferred from detention in Mardin to a prison in Sincan, Ankara in September 2015. She was released from prison pending trial in November 2015. Kaya was unseated from her post as a Mayor in September 2016 and re-arrested in January 2017. Her lawyer in 2018 was Kamuran Tanhan, who claimed the police fabricated evidence against Kaya. In 2019 she was moved to Tarsus prison in Mersin. Sara Kaya was sentenced to 16 years in prison in June 2020 majorly for being a member of an illegal organization and 2 1/2 years for misconduct in office. She was released on 10 May 2024.

== Personal life ==
Sara Kaya is married and has four children.
