= Hilal Kaplan =

Turkish journalist and columnist

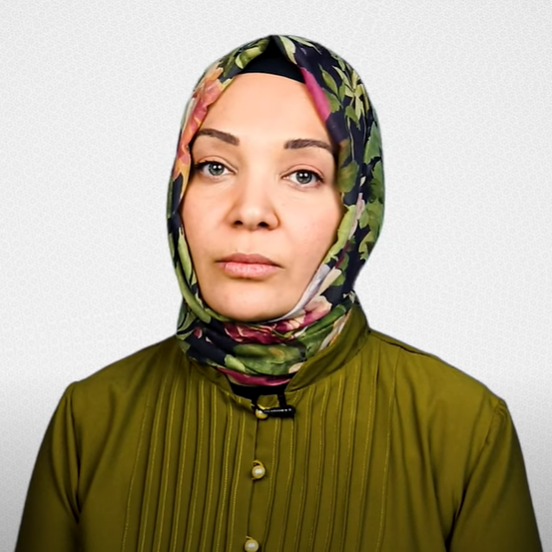
- Born: 15 August 1982 (age 44); Istanbul, Turkey
- Education: Faculty of Psychology at Istanbul Bilgi University in 2004 master's degree in Sociology at Boğaziçi University 2006
- Occupations: Journalist, Columnist
- Known for: Journalist for Sabah (newspaper)

Hilal Kaplan (born August 15, 1982, in Istanbul, Turkey) is a Turkish journalist and TRT board member and columnist for the Turkish newspaper Taraf, Yeni Şafak, Sabah and Daily Sabah.

== Career ==
Kaplan the origin of Dodurga, Orta, Çankırı of graduated from Istanbul Bilgi University and then joined the Department of Psychology in 2004.

In 2006, she started her master's degree in Sociology at Boğaziçi University.

Kaplan is an advocate of the anti-gender movement and described the LGBT movement as "perverted ideology emanating from the West".

== Personal life ==
She is known to have met her first husband during university years.

Her divorce and second marriage with his friend has been widely discussed in media, supposedly for being contradictory to her religious rhetoric. She has applied to court and granted web page access blocks for thousands of pages about her second marriage.

== Awards ==
- Turkey and Armenia Dialogue Award (2012)
- Columnist of the Year Anadolu Media Award (2018)
- award Book of the Year (2021)
