= Adnan Selçuk Mızraklı =

Former Mayor of Diyarbakır, Turkey

Adnan Selçuk Mizraklı
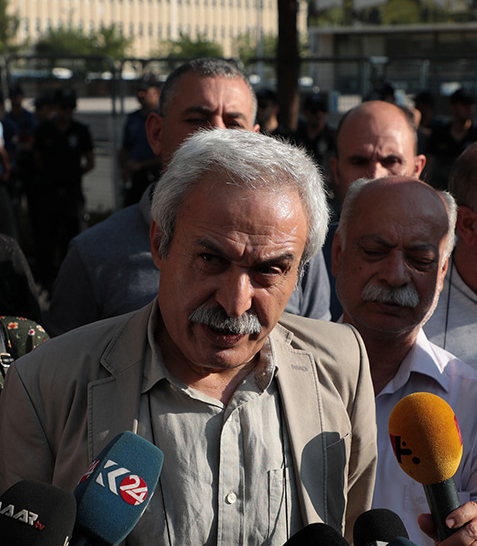

Mayor of Diyarbakır
- In office 16 April 2019 – 19 August 2019
- Preceded by: Cumali Atilla
- Succeeded by: Hasan Basri Güzeloğlu

Member of the Grand National Assembly
- In office 7 July 2018 – 16 April 2019
- Constituency: Diyarbakır (2018)

Personal details
- Born: 1963 (age 62–63) Siverek, Şanlıurfa Province, Turkey
- Party: Peoples' Democratic Party
- Occupation: Surgeon, politician

Adnan Selçuk Mızraklı (born in Siverek, 1963) is a Kurdish politician of the Peoples' Democratic Party (HDP) and former member of the Grand National Assembly of Turkey and Mayor of Diyarbakir.

== Early life and education ==
When Mızraklı was three years old his family moved to Eskişehir due to his father's work. He attended the primary and secondary school in Eskişehir. After completing his studies at the faculty of medicine, he began working as a doctor in Diyarbakir in 1991. He worked as a surgeon and was involved in the Medical Chamber. He was also active in the Democratic Society Congress (DTK) since 2000. Due to his involvement in the DTK, he was arrested for 2 months in 2017.

== Political career ==
In the General Elections of the 24 June 2018 he was elected to represent Diyarbakir as an MP. In the Municipal election of the 31 March 2019 he was elected as Mayor of Diyarbakir with 62.93% of the votes. He became well known amongst the opposition as he made public a luxury suite in Diyarbakir Municipality which was built before he took office. Due to political pressure, he was dismissed as the Mayor of Diyarbakir on 19 August 2019. The population of Diyarbakir protested for weeks against this decision.

== Legal prosecution ==
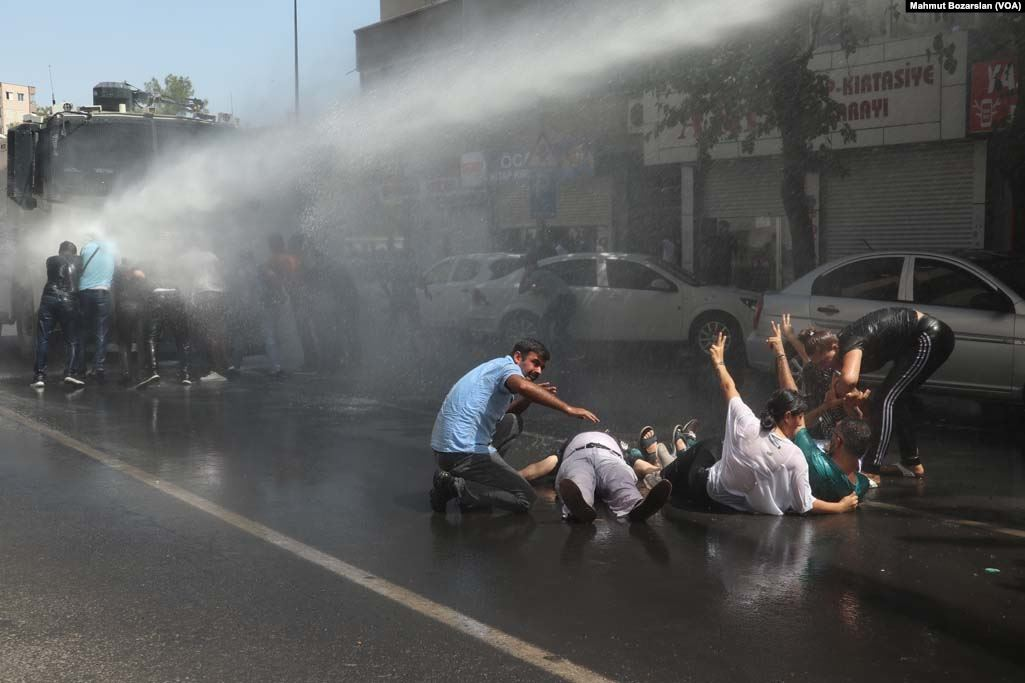
Protests against Mızraklı's dismissal

Mızraklı was detained on the 21 October 2019 and charged with being a member of terror organization. The prosecution alleged that Mizrakli had attended funerals of PKK members and that he shall have performed surgery for an alleged member of the Kurdistan Workers' Party (PKK). Human Rights Watch stated that "the evidence in an indictment against him does not support the charge that he was involved with terrorism or committed crimes." On the 9 March 2020 he was sentenced to 9 years and 4 months imprisonment for membership in a terror organization. He was accused of terror propaganda since April 2020 in an additional case. In that case, the prosecution saw his participation in meetings organized by the HDP or his activism against the execution of Ramin Hossein-Penahi in Iran as terror propaganda. In September 2021 he was acquitted.

=== Detention conditions ===
Initially being detained in a prison in Diyarbakir, he was transferred away of his hometown from the prison in Diyarbakir in Southeast Anatolia to a prison facility in Kayseri in central Anatolia. In February 2022 and at his own request, he was transferred to the F-type prison in Edirne, the same prison in which Selahattin Demirtaş is imprisoned. On September 8, 2026, he was released from the prison where he was being held after completing his sentence.

Political offices
Preceded by Cumali Atilla	Mayor of Diyarbakır; 31 March 2019 – 19 August 2019	Succeeded by Hasan Basri Güzeloğlu
