= Kocaköy =

- District and municipality
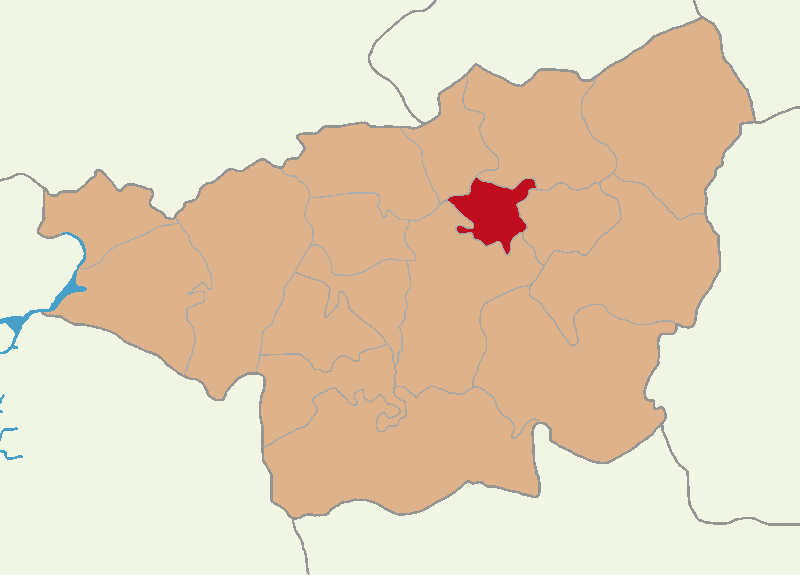
- Map showing Kocaköy District in Diyarbakır Province

- Location in Turkey
- Coordinates: 38°17′23″N 40°30′05″E
- Country: Turkey
- Province: Diyarbakır

Government
  - Mayor: Rojda Nazlıer (HDP)
- Area: 248 km^{2} (96 sq mi)
- Population (2022): 15,355
  - Density: 62/km^{2} (160/sq mi)
- Time zone: UTC+3 (TRT)
- Postal code: 21450
- Area code: 0412
- Website: www.kocakoy.bel.tr

Kocaköy (Kurdish: Karaz; Ottoman Turkish: کاراز) is a municipality and district of Diyarbakır Province, Turkey. Its area is 248 km^{2}, and its population is 15,355 (2022). It is populated by Kurds.

== Politics ==
In the local elections in March 2019 Rojda Nazlıer was elected mayor. In October 2019 she was dismissed and charged with being a member of a terrorist organization. The current District Governor is Yasin Yunak, who was also appointed as trustee after Nazlıer was dismissed.

== Composition ==
There are 22 neighbourhoods in Kocaköy District:

- Anbar
- Arkbaşı
- Boyunlu
- Bozbağlar
- Bozyar
- Çakmaklı
- Çayırlı
- Çaytepe
- Eyüpler
- Gökçen
- Gözebaşı
- Günalan
- Hacıreşit
- Kaya
- Kokulupınar
- Şaklat
- Şerifoğulları
- Şeyhşerafettin
- Suçıktı
- Tepecik
- Yazıköy
- Yenişehir

== History ==
During the conflict between the Turkish Government and the Workers' Party of Kurdistan (PKK), a part of the districts rural population was resettled urban areas.

In 2017 curfews were declared by the Turkish government aimed to support the fight against the PKK.
