= Kayapınar, Diyarbakır =

Kayapınar
- District and municipality
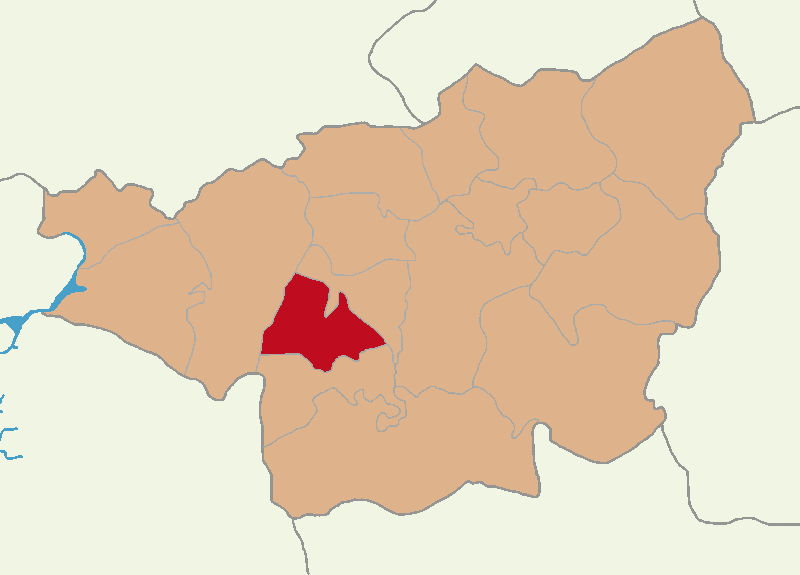
- Map showing Kayapınar District in Diyarbakır Province

- Location in Turkey
- Coordinates: 37°57′N 40°10′E
- Country: Turkey
- Province: Diyarbakır
- Area: 480 km^{2} (190 sq mi)
- Population (2022): 419,513
  - Density: 870/km^{2} (2,300/sq mi)
- Time zone: UTC+3 (TRT)
- Postal code: 21070
- Area code: 0412
- Website: www.kayapinar.bel.tr

Kayapınar is municipality and district of Diyarbakır Province, Turkey. Its area is 480 km^{2}, and its population is 419,513 (2022). It covers the northwestern part of the city of Diyarbakır and the adjacent countryside. The district Kayapınar was created in 2008 from part of the central district (Merkez) of Diyarbakır.

In the local elections of 31 March 2019, Keziban Yılmaz was elected Mayor with 66.35% of the votes. On the 21 October 2019, he was detained due to an investigation concerning propaganda for a terror organization and being a member of a terror organization.

During the Mayorship of Zülküf Karatekin, there was an unnamed park in the town. The Kayapinar Park was named Rosna by the Municipality in 2008, but this name was rejected by the Governorship of Kayapinar. An other park was the Medya Park in which a pool allegedly in the shape of a Kurdistan was located. Karatekin was investigated for being involved in the construction of the pool in 2007. The Ceylan Önkol park was inaugurated in 2010 to which inauguration Karatekin sent a letter from prison.

== Composition ==
There are 34 neighbourhoods in Kayapınar District:

- Avcısuyu
- Barış
- Baykara
- Beneklitaş
- Cankatran
- Çölgüzeli
- Cücük
- Cumhuriyet
- Diclekent
- Esentepe
- Fırat
- Gözalan
- Gözegöl
- Güleçoba
- Harmanardı
- Hatipoğlu
- Huzurevleri
- Kaldırım
- Karayakup
- Keklik
- Kırkpınar
- Medya
- Mezopotamya
- Petek
- Peyas
- Sağkulak
- Sultantepe
- Taban
- Talaytepe
- Tişo
- Tosunlu
- Uyandık
- Yeniözerli
- Yolboyu Pirinçlık
