= Nihal Bengisu Karaca =

Turkish journalist and author

- Born: 1972 (age 53–54); Ankara, Turkey
- Education: Marmara University
- Occupations: Journalist, author, columnist

Nihal Bengisu Karaca (born 1972) is a Turkish journalist and author.

She was born in Ankara in 1972. Her father was a surgeon originating from the Turkish minority of Komotini, Greece. She finished her studies at Kayseri İmam Hatip High School and later graduated from Marmara University, School of Law. In 1994, she started her career by working for Aksiyon magazine. Between 1995 and 1996, she worked for Kanal 7 as a text author and programmer. At the end of 1996, she worked as a culture and art editor at Aksiyon, where she released film criticism and wrote files and interviews about culture, literature and society. In 2002, she started working for Zaman newspaper and continued her movie reviews, published articles on culture, and contributed to the newspaper's art section. From 2005, she started writing for weekly news magazine Yeni Aktüel.

In 2007, she came to media spotlight with her article for Radikal, titled "A journalist's holiday diary", after which she was interviewed by Hürriyet writer Ayşe Arman. After Ayşe Arman sent her a message of condolences on her father's death in 2009, the two had a two-part interview as "representatives of two different neighborhoods". In February 2009, she penned her final article for Zaman, after which she started working for Habertürk.

After moving to Habertürk, the author was often compared to Ahmet Hakan, and after her article "Portrait of the victim as a femme fatale" in her first months of working for Habertürk she received harsh criticism and had to argue with some writers in the same newspaper. She responded to the criticism by saying, "... I don't think I deserve these. I'm upset and angry." and later wrote a new article titled "Portrait of the victim as a femme fatale 2!".
