= Diyarbakır Bar Association =

Organization of lawyers in Turkey

- Diyarbakır Barosu
- Formation: 1927
- Founded at: Diyarbakır
- Purpose: Bar Association
- Headquarters: Diyarbakır
- President: Cihan Aydın
- Key people: Sezgin Tanrikulu, Tahir Elçi

The Diyarbakır Bar Association is an organization of lawyers established in the year 1927. It is one of the 81 members of the Turkish Bars Association. Several of its leaders were prosecuted and one of its presidents was assassinated. The current president is Cihan Aydın and it is constituted by about 1500 lawyers.

== History ==
Tahir Elçi, the then president of the Bar Association was murdered while making a peace declaration for the Kurdish-Turkish conflict on the 28 November 2015. He was murdered after a prosecutor demanded 7.5 years imprisonment for having declared that the Kurdistan Workers' Party (PKK) is not a terror organization on the 14 October 2015. The Diyarbakır Bar Association itself also received intimidating phone calls and messages but as its members approached the prosecutor asking for protection, their demands were denied.

The Bar Association was investigated for its criticism over the prohibition of pronouncing Kurdistan in theTurkish Grand National Assembly. It was also investigated for making a declaration in solidarity of the victims of the Armenian genocide on the 24 April 2019. Ahmet Özmen, the former head of the Bar Association as well as several members of the board are prosecuted according to Article 301 of the Turkish Penal Code. On 28 April 2021, Turkish prosecutors launched another probe of the association over a statement that "The ‘Armenian Deportation’ which started on April 24, 1915 has marked the beginning of one of the most painful calamities of our social history. This is why April 24 is one of the darkest days of the Armenian nation who has scattered around the world’s every corner." The bar association is facing charges of "insulting the Turkish nation, the Turkish Republic, the state’s institutions and bodies". In October 2022, all defendants were acquitted as both the defense and the prosecution demanded their acquittal.

In April 2020, the Bar Association was also investigated for insulting religious values after it criticized Ali Erbaş, the head of the Turkish Directorate of Religious affairs following his remarks about homosexuality causing illnesses. In November 2020, some of the Bar Associations lawyers who were assigned as election supervisors in local elections 2019, were detained as their names were found mentioned in documents of the Democratic Society Congress (DTK), which is a legal organization but viewed as linked with the PKK.

== Awards ==
- 2016 International Hrant Dink Prize.
- 2018 International Ludovic Trarieux Human Rights Special Mention of the Jury.
