= Halil Savda =

Turkish conscientious objector (born 1974)

Halil Savda (born 1974) is a Turkish conscientious objector who has been subjected to continued arrest and conviction for his refusal to serve mandatory military service – in violation of Turkish law.

== Early life and education ==
Halil Savda was born in Southeastern Anatolia, Turkey (in the Cizre district of Şırnak province) to a Kurdish family. Savda is a graduate of primary school.

== Conscientious objection to military service ==
When Savda involuntarily arrived at the Çorlu military base in late November 2004, he immediately refused to join his assigned military unit. Savda argued that he could not physically serve as a soldier because of the torture he endured in jail since 1993. He then wrote a letter to the Turkish commander declaring himself to be a conscientious objector - demanding that Turkey recognize the right to conscientious objection. On 26 November 2004 Savda was arrested at the Çorlu Military Prosecutor's office where he declared once again that he would not “serve in the military as it contradicted his conscience and beliefs.” On 16 December 2004 Savda appeared before the Çorlu Military Court. At trial, Savda argued “I believe that the responsibility of war does not only belong to those who wage it, but to everyone who condones it. With my conscientious objection, I would like to show that I do not want to bear this responsibility and that by refusing to be silent about militarism I am refusing to be a part of it.” The Military Court found Savda guilty of “insisting on disobeying” his requirement as a Turkish citizen to serve the Turkish military. The court ordered his immediate arrest, and transferred Savda from the military unit to Corlu Military Prison. However, he was released from custody less than two weeks later.

After being released, Savda began to publicly campaign against the Turkish law requiring military participation. On 23 October 2006, Savda announced the founding of the Conscientious Objection Platform (“COP”), declaring that its objective is “the legalization of conscientious objection” in Turkey. On 7 December 2006, less than two months after forming the COP, Halil Savda was arrested and detained once again when he attended a trial session in Çorlu Military Court on charges of “persistent disobedience” of Turkish law.

A week after his arrest, attorney Kadriye Doğru went to visit him at the military prison but was refused access. According to Doğru, there was no reasonable justification for her being denied access, and that “her meeting was hindered on completely arbitrary grounds”. She asked the military prosecutor for justification for being denied admission, and the prosecutor responded that “he is not in the position to give (a justification)”. According to Doğru, “Neither the code of criminal procedure, the military criminal code, nor the code of military criminal procedure include any clause which could be used to hinder a detainee in prison from meeting a lawyer. This situation is an obstruction of the right to defense.”

On 25 January 2007, Savda's trial attorney, Suna Coşkun, was able to get Savda released from custody while his trial was ongoing. However, upon being released, Savda was ordered to the Tekirdağ Beşiktepe 8th Mechanized Brigade. With knowledge of Savda's beliefs, his 2004 conviction, and his ongoing trial, the brigade officer ordered Savda to wear a military uniform. Savda repeated that he was a conscientious objector and that he would not perform military service, which included wearing a military uniform. Upon this statement, Halil was presented to the Çorlu military prosecutor with the charge of “insistent insubordination.” The prosecutor sent Savda back to the military unit where Savda would be subjected to severe harassment. At the disciplinary ward of the 8th Mechanized Brigade, a sergeant major, two guardians and an officer pushed Savda to the wall face-on, kicked his legs apart and began hitting him – causing his face to swell. Savda was placed in a room at the military base where he was forced to sleep without bed or blankets. In response, Savda protested his inhumane treatment by conducting a five-day hunger strike.

Savda was ultimately convicted by the Çorlu Military Court for disobeying orders (for refusing to wear the military uniform) and desertion (for failing to report to his military unit). On 15 March 2007 the court sentenced Savda to 15 months imprisonment. On 12 April 2007 the court sentenced him to an additional six months imprisonment, bringing his prison time up to 21 and ½ months. In accordance with Turkish practice, the court did not go into the reasoning for the sentence. The judicial justification for a second sentence may be released when the written judgment is made available. Nevertheless, even when he is released from prison, Halil Savda will likely not be set free. Based on historical practice, Savda will either be sent back to his military unit, or be forced to live a clandestine life.

== Criticism of the military court ruling ==
The international community expressed concern with the manner in which the Turkish government and military have dealt with conscientious objectors.

=== European Court of Human Rights ===
The Savda sentence arguably goes against the spirit of the judgment of the European Court of Human Rights from January 2006. At that time, the European Court of Human Rights found that Turkey had violated article 3 of the European Convention on Human Rights, specifically the prohibition of degrading treatment, in a case dealing with conscientious objector Osman Murat Ülke. The Court in Ülke's case noted: “The numerous criminal prosecutions against the applicant, the cumulative effects of the criminal convictions which resulted from them and the constant alternation between prosecutions and terms of imprisonment, together with the possibility that he would be liable to prosecution for the rest of his life, had been disproportionate to the aim of ensuring that he did his military service. They were more calculated to repressing the applicant’s intellectual personality, inspiring in him feelings of fear, anguish and vulnerability capable of humiliating and debasing him and breaking his resistance and will. The clandestine life amounting almost to “civil death” which the applicant had been compelled to adopt was incompatible with the punishment regime of a democratic society.”

Although the ECHR has found Turkey guilty in Ülke's conscientious objector case, no step has been taken by the government of Turkey to make legal changes to comply with the ruling. According to the COP, the treatment of Savda reasonably suggests that Turkey is ignoring the ruling made by the ECHR in 2006. Turkey continues to punish individuals concurrently for the same offense. It is arguable that unless there is a change in the law, or a change of heart on the part of the military and their courts, conscientious objectors in Turkey will be condemned to endlessly repeated convictions for the same act, an effective life imprisonment sentence.

=== War Resisters’ International ===
According to War Resisters’ International, the 15 March 2007 sentence of Savda constitutes a violation of Article 9 of the European Convention on Human Rights, and Article 18 of the International Covenant on Civil and Political Rights allowing for freedom of thought, conscience, and religion, both of which Turkey has signed and ratified. Furthermore, the WSI argues that the 12 April 2007 sentence violates not only the aforementioned articles, but also constitutes a violation of Article 14 paragraph 7 of the ICCPR, which states that “no one shall be liable to be tried or punished again for an offence for which he has already been finally convicted or acquitted in accordance with the law and penal procedure of each country”.

=== The United Nations Working Group on Arbitrary Detention ===
The U.N. Working Group is of the opinion that “there is, since, after the initial conviction, the person exhibits, for reasons of conscience, a constant resolve not to obey the subsequent summons, so that there is ‘one and the same action entailing the same consequences and, therefore, the offence is the same and not a new one’” The Working Group concludes that “to interpret such a refusal as being perhaps provisional (selective) would, in a country where the rule of law prevails, be tantamount to compelling someone to change his mind for fear of being deprived of his liberty if not for life, at least until the date at which citizens cease to be liable to military service.”

=== Amnesty International ===
In 2012, Amnesty International designated Savda a prisoner of conscience, "detained solely for the peaceful exercise of his right to freedom of expression". The group called for his immediate and unconditional release.

== Conscription in Turkey ==
In Turkey, compulsory military service, or conscription, is enshrined in Article 72 of the 1982 Turkish Constitution. According to Article 72, “Fatherland service is the right and duty of every Turk”. Mandatory service applies to all male citizens from 20 to 41 years of age, but the length of service varies depending on the individual's education and occupation. Individuals without a higher education must serve 15 months (the amount Savda would have to serve). Those with a university degree either serve 12 months as a reserve officer or serve six months as a short term private. Those citizens who have worked outside Turkey for at least three consecutive years can pay a certain fee (approximately 5,000 Euros) and serve only 21 days of basic training instead of the typical 15-month service.

== Conscientious objection in Turkey ==
The issue of conscientious objection is a highly debated and controversial issue in Turkey. Turkey and Azerbaijan are the only two members of the Council of Europe that still refuse to recognize conscientious objection. Although Article 24.1 of the 1982 Constitution guarantees the right to freedom of conscience, it does not extend to the right to conscientious objection to military service. In 1991, the Turkish Constitutional Court explicitly ruled that the freedom of conscience mentioned in Article 24 does not include the right to conscientious objection to military service. Article 63 of the Turkish Military Penal Code punishes conscientious objectors for avoiding military service. Furthermore, Article 318 allows these individuals to be punished up to 2 years if they attract media attention or publish articles about their refusal to perform military service.

Despite Turkey's position on conscientious objection, a small number of individuals have publicly refused to perform military service for non-religious, pacifist reasons. The first known conscientious objector in Turkey was Ülke, a Turkish citizen who grew up in Germany and returned to Turkey. In 1995 he publicly declared that he was a conscientious objector and refused to perform military service. Ülke has been continuously subjected to recurring punishments related to his conscientious objector status. Since Ülke, dozens of others have followed. Between 1995 and 2004 approximately 40 men openly declared themselves as conscientious objectors, mostly by making a public statement or giving media interviews about their reasons for refusing military service. Among the most notable, aside from Ülke and Savda, were Mehmet Tarhan and Perihan Magden. Mehmet Tarhan, a gay anarchist and conscientious objector, was imprisoned for refusing military service in Turkey. He was sentenced to four years in a military prison but was unexpectedly released in March 2006. Journalist Perihan Magden was tried by a Turkish court for supporting Tarhan and advocating conscientious objection as a human right, but was acquitted.

== Other sources ==
- http://www.refusingtokill.net/Turkey%20Halil/Halil%20index.htm
- http://www.refusingtokill.net/Turkey%20Halil/HalilSavdaArrested.htm
- http://www.refusingtokill.net/Turkey%20Halil/hastytranslation.htm
- http://www.wri-irg.org/news/alerts/msg00082.html
