= CIVIVA =

The Swiss Civil Service Association, best known under its abbreviation CIVIVA, is a Swiss organization that advocates for the preservation and expansion of Swiss Civilian Service.

== History ==
The association was founded in 2010 in Bern by organizations supportive of civilian service and peace policy as a national umbrella organization for civil service. In 2013 other organizations joined CIVIVA: the advisory service zivildienst.ch and the Community of Swiss Civil Servants (German: Gemeinschaft Schweizer Zivildienstleistender, GSZ). CIVIVA is independent of authorities and is financed through membership fees and donations. Its members include individuals as well as civil service deployment organizations and institutions. The association itself is a member of the European Bureau for Conscientious Objection.

CIVIVA maintains a professional office. The association is led by a volunteer board, co-presided by Priska Seiler Graf (National Councilor SP/ZH) and Fabien Fivaz (National Councilor Green/NE) since 2022.

Heiner Studer (former member of the Swiss National Council, EVP from Aargau) held the presidency of the association from its founding in 2010 until 2018.

== Focus ==
The Swiss Civilian Service Association aims to advocate for the concerns of civilian service providers and civilian service deployment organizations in politics and public perception. The association pursues the following goals:

- Political recognition: The association advocates for increased political and societal appreciation for the commitment of civilian service providers.
- Admission and implementation: According to CIVIVA's position, no disadvantages should result from a conscientious objection examination or a requirement for proof of the objection.
- Flexible deployment conditions: The association promotes the option for civilian service to be performed on a part-time basis.
- Access or alternative service: CIVIVA also believes that individuals not subject to compulsory service should be allowed to join civilian service voluntarily without obstacles in the future. If this is not feasible, an alternative solution would be necessary.

== Activities ==
The following activities are the focus of the associations's work:

- Politics and Advocacy: CIVIVA monitors the political developments concerning civil service. The association maintains regular contact with politicians from various parties and advocates for the preservation and expansion of civil service.
- Implementation Agency: CIVIVA engages in dialogue with the Civilian Service Implementation Agency (ZIVI) to discuss developments-
- Le Monde Civil: The bilingual association magazine is published quarterly in two languages, covering news, deployment opportunities, and background information related to civil service.
- Media: CIVIVA actively voices its stance in the media regarding political decisions affecting the development of civil service.
- Prix CIVIVA: Since 2011, the Swiss Civil Service Association has awarded the Prix CIVIVA for outstanding commitment to civil service.
- Consultations: A team of voluntary advisors at CIVIVA provides support on questions related to civil service or conscription in general.

The association had announced a referendum for 2020 on the planned revision of the Civil Service Actm which aimed to restrict access to civil service. The referendum became obsolete as the newly elected National Council rejected the legislative revision to the final vote.
