= Osman Murat Ülke =

Turkish conscientious objector (born 1970)

- Born: Ründeroth, Cologne, Germany
- Known for: conscientious objector

Osman Murat Ülke (born 1970) is a Turkish conscientious objector. He was imprisoned for two and a half years for refusal of military service, and was the subject of a ruling from the European Court of Human Rights.

== Arrest and trial ==
Ülke publicly burned his conscription orders after being called for duty September 1, 1995. A year later, he was detained in İzmir and formally arrested on October 8. He was put on trial at the Military Court of the General Staff in Ankara, charged with "alienating the public from the institution of military service" and was additionally charged for burning his call-up papers and declaring his conscientious objection.

=== International response ===
Amnesty International contacted the Turkish government, requesting that it provide alternative civilian service. Turkish law had no such provision in place. The human rights group made its suggestion based on recommendations made by the United Nations Commission on Human Rights and the Council of Europe.

The European Court of Human Rights found the nation had violated of article 3 of the convention in its persecution of Ülke. The court ordered Turkey to pay 11,000 euros to Ülke in compensation.

== Aftermath ==
After serving his term in prison, Ülke and his family continued to be harassed, according to Human Rights Watch.

A second conscientious objector, Mehmet Tarhan, has also been imprisoned by Turkish officials.

== Awards and honors ==
- 2007 Clara Immerwahr Award from the German affiliate of the International Physicians for the Prevention of Nuclear War.
