= Conscription in Cyprus =

Military service is mandatory both in the Republic of Cyprus and in Northern Cyprus. In the Greek-speaking areas of the country, it is mandatory for all male citizens and also some non-citizens to serve in the Cypriot National Guard for 14 months. An alternative civilian service for conscientious objectors is possible, lasting 19 months. In the Turkish-speaking area, military service lasts between 12 and 15 months, while no alternative civilian service is recognized and conscientious objectors can face imprisonment.

== Republic of Cyprus ==
The Republic of Cyprus has an active military draft. Conscripts enlisting as of the 2020 winter draft have to serve a term of 14 months, and military service continues as a reservist after the end of the term. Reservists are called up several times a year, for 1 or 2 days at a time, each year until the age of 50, at which point they can choose to voluntarily continue their military service. The Cyprus Army enlists both Cypriot citizens and those who don't hold a Cypriot citizenship but have ‘Cypriot origins’, i.e. people residing in Cyprus and born of a parent of Greek Cypriot descent, lasting from the January 1 of the year in which they turn 18 years of age to December 31, of the year in which they turn 50. This is not in accordance with international law since only citizenship can be attached to civic duties.

All male residents of Cyprus who are of military age (16 and over) are required to obtain an exit visa from the Ministry of Defense.

If conscientious objector status is claimed due to religious or ideological reasons, the objector may serve either an alternative military or civil service, depending on the circumstances of each case. Enlisting had been optional for members of the Armenian, Maronite, and Roman Catholic minorities, but as of 2008 service was made compulsory for them as well.

Conscripts will complete three weeks basic training at one of three recruit training centers, located in Paphos, Limassol and Larnaca. After taking an oath of allegiance on the Thursday of their third week of basic training they are granted three days leave. They will then complete a week of individual training with their assigned units followed by two weeks of battle school. This is followed by MOS training that lasts between two and 10 weeks depending upon their specialty.

== Northern Cyprus ==
Military service in Northern Cyprus is mandatory for all male citizens and lasts between 12 and 15 months. An alternative civilian service is not recognized and conscientious objectors face being arrested for refusing to serve in the army. The European Bureau for Conscientious Objection supports several legal cases of Turkish Cypriot conscientious objectors against the Turkish government. The European Court of Human Rights ruled in May 2024 that Northern Cyprus was violating Article 9 of the European Convention on Human Rights.

== See also ==
- Reduction of military conscription in Cyprus
