= Swiss Civilian Service =

Substitute for military service

The Swiss Civilian Service is a Swiss institution, created in 1996 as a civilian substitute service to military service. It was introduced as part of the so-called Vision 95 (Armeeleitbild 95) reform package. Anyone who is unable to do military service for reasons of conscience can submit an application to perform civilian service instead. Formerly, the applicant was then forced to attend a hearing where they had to explain their reasons for refusal. Now, they must simply take part in a one-day introductory session to civilian service within three months of submitting their application.

If one is unfit to serve in the military because of physical or psychological impairments, he is also deemed unfit for civilian service, even if the impairments do not render the individual unable to fulfill a specific task related to the civilian service. This is true, for example, for a disabled person in a wheelchair who is perfectly able to work in the administration of a nursing home, however since 2013 people deem unfit can choose to apply for a military service despite incapacity, most notably Nouh Arhab in 2021 who served in the army despite being in a wheelchair.

Men declared unfit to serve in the military pay an exemption tax of 3 percent of their yearly taxable income until the age of 37 but a maximum of eleven installments. However, anyone who is considered unfit for service and receives a pension or helplessness allowance from the Federal Disability Insurance or Accident Insurance is exempt from the tax. The same applies to anyone who is considered unfit for service due to a major disability and is not in receipt of a helplessness allowance, but nevertheless fulfills one of the two minimum requirements for the granting of such an allowance (including deaf people). Finally, anyone who, due to a major physical, mental or psychological disability, has an income subject to tax which, after deductions, does not exceed by more than 100% his subsistence minimum within the meaning of the law of prosecution is also exempt from tax.

Conscripts found to be sufficiently unfit for regular military service, but not for exemption, take part in civil protection, where they may be called on to assist the police, fire or health departments, as well as natural disaster relief and crowd control during demonstrations or events with large attendance. Each day served will reduce their exemption tax by 4 percent.

Women are also allowed to serve in the civilian service or in the armed forces. Women serve voluntarily.

In 2005, the Swiss Federal Assembly began to discuss if the "state of conscience hearings" should be abolished and if the willingness to serve a longer time (see below) should be the only criterion, citing the large administrative costs for judging the cases of just a few thousand applicants per year. The high rate of young people opting to serve in the alternative service has also created organizational problems. On the other hand, the civilian service option under the Vision 95 reform package has increased the rate of approval of the public, particularly the young segment of the population, for the existence of the Swiss armed forces.

== Civilian service ==
Once part of the civilian service program, one has to work 50 percent longer than the total normal cumulative military service period. Full cumulative military service for normal soldiers is currently 245 days, while full civilian service is 365 days. Many nonprofit organizations are licensed to employ civilian service workers. Unlike the former Civilian Service in Germany, where the servants did their work mainly in hospitals and healthcare sites, Swiss ones can apply for work in a broad variety of opportunities: health care, welfare, environmental protection, agriculture (small or alpine farms), research projects, and development assistance abroad.

Civilian servicemen must have the appropriate skills for each type of assignment – for example, because there are very few job vacancies in development aid.

A big difference between civilian and military service is that civilian service participants can greatly profit from their substitute service – in terms of work experience – to achieve a better position after the service, although it is formally not allowed to do civilian service with, for example, the goal of passing an exam in mind. So, during civilian service in a research institute, one must not write personal academic papers to be submitted at a later time.

There are still issues with how to handle Swiss living abroad who have already passed recruitment and are already members of the Swiss militia army. In this case, they are not exempt from military service or civilian service, and every step of the application process requires their presence in Switzerland.

== See also ==
- Pacifism
- Civilian service
- Zivildienst
- Civil protection in Switzerland
- CIVIVA
