= Reduction of military conscription in Cyprus =

The proposal for reduction of military conscription in Cyprus has been suggested by different Cypriot politicians over the years and still has support today. Conscription in Cyprus was in force long before the Turkish invasion and subsequent occupation. Turkey occupies 36.2% of the island and British Sovereign bases occupy 3%. Conscription in Cyprus was introduced in 1974 to defend the island from future military threats from Turkey which occupied and still controls approximately one third of Cyprus. However, supporters of reduction of military conscription propose a professional army personnel, trained specially for the preservation of peace and stability of the island. The main political parties which support this proposal are Democratic Rally and Progressive Party of Working People (AKEL), together with a number of pressure and activist groups.

== Reasons for support ==
Supporters of reduction of military conscription suggest better management of the National Guard in an attack with limited but highly disciplined paid personnel rather than a chaotic large group of unqualified soldiers. They insist that Cyprus National Guard requires a large expenditure for its needs, which could be spent on other aspects of life on the island which lack financial support. This idea has been put into practice as of the beginning of 2016 by reducing military conscription from 24 months to 14 months.

== Democratic Rally ==
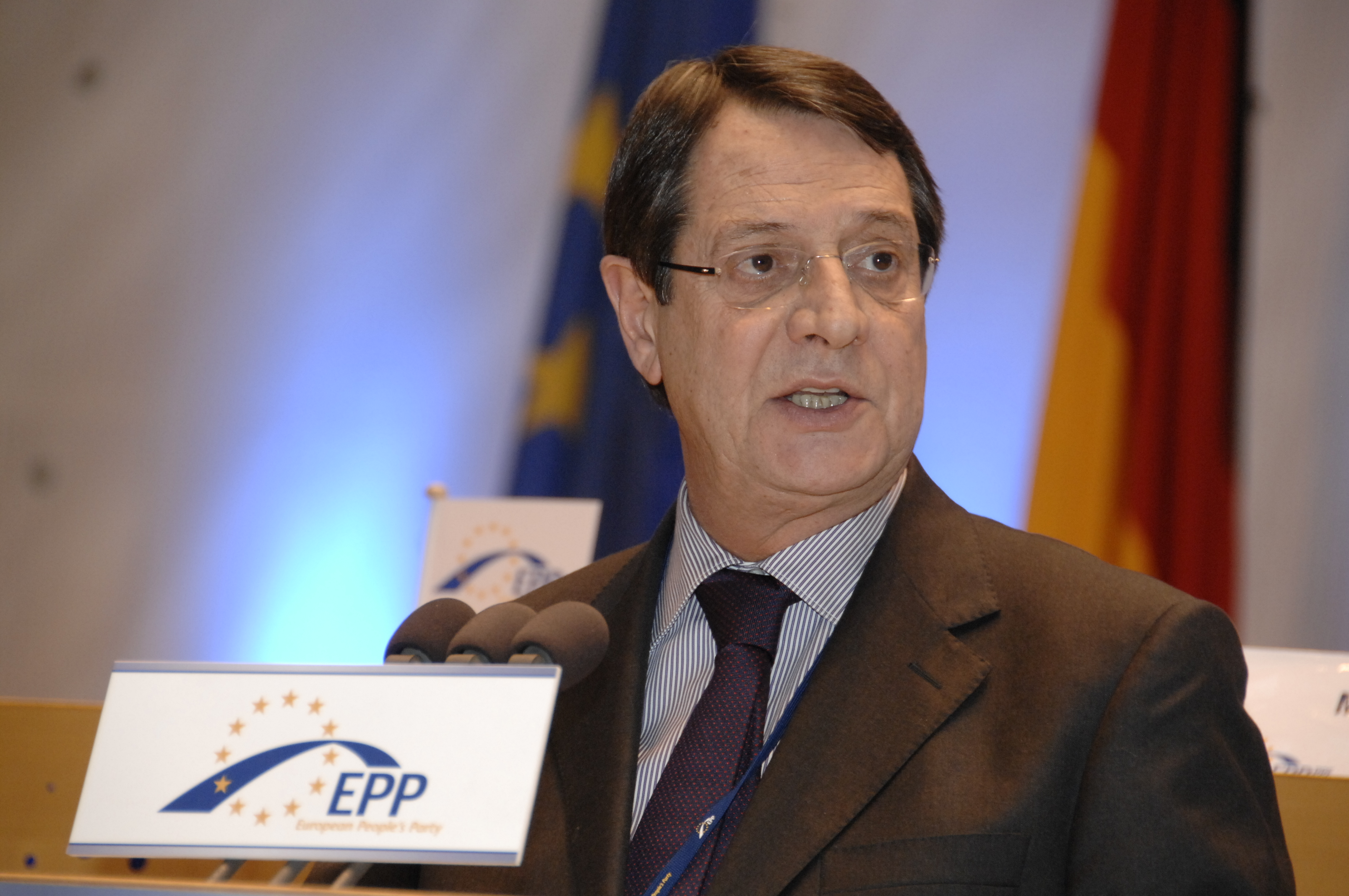
Nicos Anastasiades, political leader of Democratic Rally has been an all-time supporter of changing duration of military conscription

The Democratic Rally has been a constant supporter of reducing military conscription to the minimum number of months. A motion for reduction of military service from 24 to 14 months, while recruiting the necessary number of professional soldiers, was backed by the Democratic Rally in 2011. Party chairman Nicos Anastasiades, during his press conference, presented the party's proposals on defence, stating that the Cyprus National Guard would be transformed into a modern semi-professional army. Referring to the economic aspect, he has said that the state would incur additional costs for only four to five years but then the costs would be reduced. The party also suggests that by spending the minimum percent of the gross domestic product on defence and on preserving the needs of military conscripted soldiers, it could spend much more on education and agriculture.

== Progressive Party of Working People ==
AKEL's MP Aristos Aristotelous stated in a press conference regarding the party's stance that the reduction of military service is a requirement of society and those who oppose will be confronted with the public. Speaking on the sidelines of the sessions of Parliament, Aristotelous commented that the vast majority of the Cypriot people are convinced that reorganization of the National Guard should be promoted, making it into a well-trained force in contrast to what prevails today since its creation. Former party leader Demetris Christofias reassured the public that the overarching objective remains the culmination of an accepted and workable solution to free Cyprus from Turkish occupation and troops.

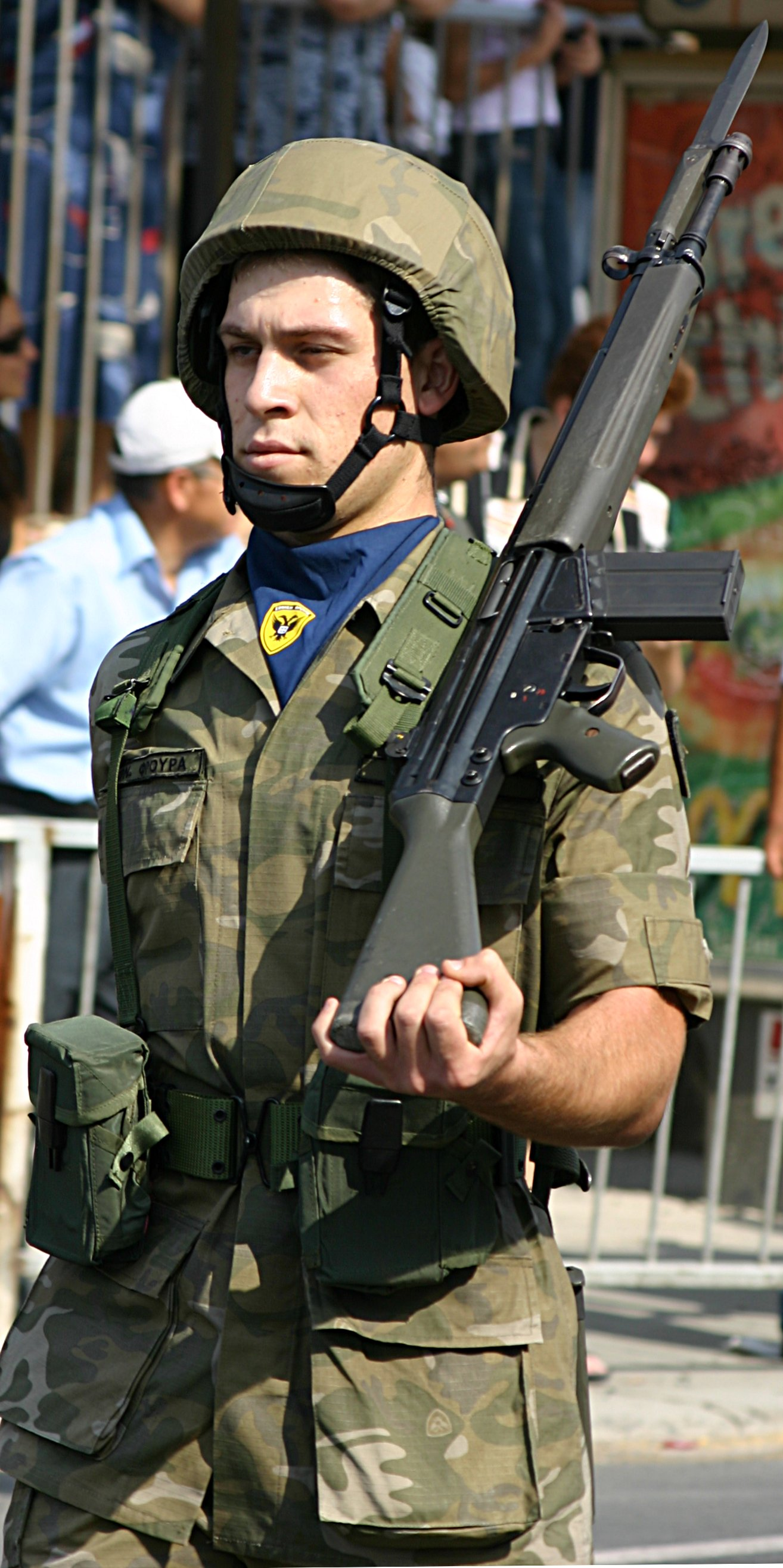
Cypriot soldier in his typical military uniform armed with a G3 rifle

== See also ==
- Cypriot National Guard
- Conscription
- Conscription crisis
