= İnan Süver =

Turkish conscientious objector

- Born: İnan Süver
- Known for: 2010–2011 imprisonment for conscientious objection

İnan Süver is a Turkish conscientious objector who served a prison term for desertion from the Turkish Armed Forces.

Süver was drafted by the Turkish Armed Forces in 2001. He served for thirteen months before deserting, apparently on a release with an order to return to his unit. Though Süver stated that he was unaware of the principle of conscientious objection at the time of his desertion, he declared himself a conscientious objector in a letter to the military in 2009. In May 2010, he told a reporter, "widespread knowledge about conscientious objection would be the end of the war":

I believe conscientious objection is going to be more common and this common approach against violation and compulsory enlistment makes it possible to end the war. This is important for both Kurds and Turks. Our struggle as conscientious objectors is going to open the path to have common understanding against war.

On 5 August 2010, Süver was arrested in his home on an outstanding warrant for desertion. He was then taken to military prison in Istanbul. On 24 August, the Aegean Armed Forces Command Court found Süver guilty of "infringement of leave". He had three previous convictions for desertion.

On 8 October, Süver was transferred to Buca prison in İzmir, where he was repeatedly hospitalized as a result of his health deteriorating from hunger strikes. On 5 April 2011, he was transferred to Manisa Saruhanlı semi-open prison, which he escaped sixteen days later. He was re-arrested the following day at the home of a friend, and returned to Buca prison.

In 2010, Amnesty International and War Resisters' International issued calls for Süver's release, with War Resisters' International adding their fears that he would face torture or other ill-treatment during his imprisonment. Amnesty International also named him a prisoner of conscience. When the band U2 visited Turkey in September 2010, Bono called on Prime Minister Recep Tayyip Erdoğan to investigate Süver's treatment, and reported that Erdoğan agreed to "look into it."

Süver was conditionally released from Balıkesir prison on 9 December 2011. In September 2012 he was re-arrested in Istanbul and given a five-month prison sentence for his April 2011 escape. He was released on 12 October, as his previous pre-trial detention also counted toward the sentence.

İnan Süver has a wife, Remziye Süver.
