= International Conscientious Objectors' Day =

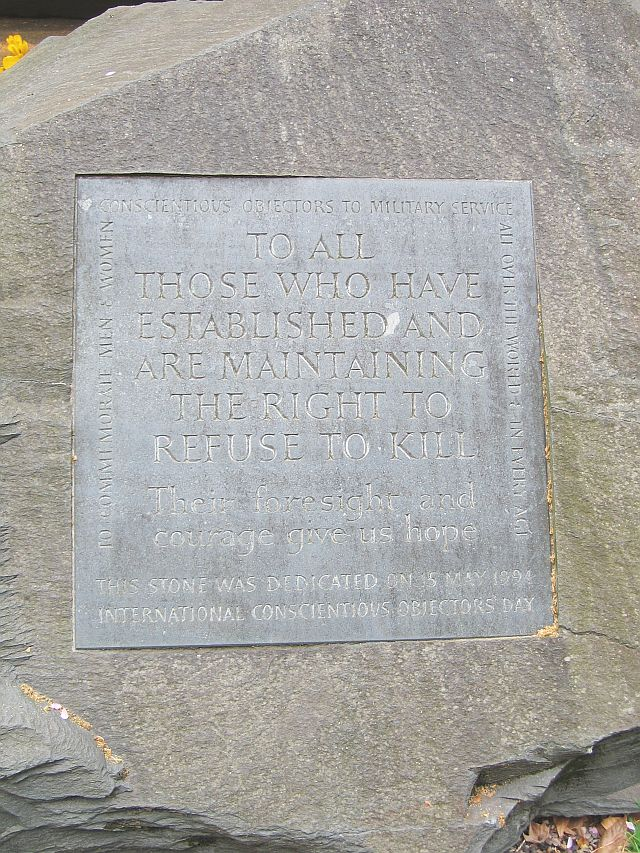
Conscientious Objectors Memorial, Tavistock Square, London, unveiled on 15 May 1994

The International Conscientious Objectors' Day (sometimes shortened to Conscientious Objectors' Day) is a day of remembrance and an awareness day observed annually on May 15 by the peace movement to honour those who have refused and continue to refuse to take part in war and military service.

At the International Conscientious Objectors’ Meeting (ICOM), a conference held annually from 1981 to 1997, it was decided in 1985 to mark the day each year on 15 May. The day was adopted from the European Conscientious Objectors’ Day organised by the European Bureau of Conscientious Objectors in 1982, 1983, and 1984.

Each year, special attention has been given to a country where conscientious objectors face particular difficulties. Focus countries have included Greece (1986), Yugoslavia (1987), Poland (1988), South Africa (1989), Spain (1990), Turkey (1992), the former Yugoslavia (1993), Colombia (1995), Angola (2001), and the Balkan region (2002). Thematic focuses have included conscription of women (1991) and asylum for conscientious objectors (1993).

In connection with Russia’s invasion of Ukraine since 2022 and renewed debates in Germany about the reintroduction of compulsory military service, informational and commemorative events have again become more common on International Conscientious Objectors' Day. In 2024, the German Peace Society (Deutsche Friedensgesellschaft – Vereinigte KriegsdienstgegnerInnen) drew attention to the situation of around 1,000 Ukrainian conscientious objectors living in Germany without valid passports.

== See also ==
- List of commemorative days
