= Mehmet Tarhan =

Turkish conscientious objector (born 1978)

Mehmet Tarhan (born 1978) is a Kurdish conscientious objector who was imprisoned for refusing military service. Tarhan had been sentenced to four years in a military prison for disobedience after refusing to wear a military uniform, a sentence that is evidently the longest ever given for such an offense in Turkey. He was released in March 2006 after spending several months in prison. As of 2014, he is a member of the party assembly of the Peoples' Democratic Party and a member of the executive committee of its consultative body Peoples' Democratic Congress.

== Life ==
According to Tarhan, he was born into a Kurdish peasant family. At the age of 17 he worked as a government employee in Diyarbakır. During this time he worked with KAOS GL (an independent political and cultural LGBT group) and Lambdaistanbul (an LGBT civil society initiative). He also became involved in and supported anti-military efforts. Tarhan credits his sexual and ethnic identity with causing him to question militarism.

During his days in prison he was offered and accepted to join Jury of Conscience of World Tribunal on Iraq.

== Conscientious objection ==
Tarhan first publicly objected to military service in October 2001. At a press conference in Ankara he said,

"I condemn every kind of violence and believe that joining or condoning violence will only result in new violence and everyone will be responsible for the consequences. I think that wars caused by power-mongering states are first and foremost a violation of the right to life. The violation of the right to life is a crime against humanity and no international convention or law can justify this crime, regardless of any rationale. I therefore declare that I won't be an agent of such crime under any circumstances. I will not serve any military apparatus."

== Arrest and trial ==
In Turkey, all men face conscription for up to 15 months. In January 2006, the European Court of Human Rights (ECHR) sentenced Turkey for violation of article 3 of the European Convention on Human Rights (prohibition of degrading treatment) in a case dealing with conscientious objection.

== Sexual orientation ==
Tarhan could have avoided military service by stating that he is gay. However, the Turkish military perceives homosexuality as an "illness" and requires rectal examination and visual "evidence" to support such a claim. Mehmet did not want to be classified as "ill" and instead sought to be classified as a conscientious objector.

== Trial ==
Tarhan was arrested in April 2005 and tried the next month on charges of insubordination under Article 88 of the Turkish Military Penal Code. Mehmet was convicted, at which point the military prosecutor released Tarhan, stating that Tarhan had already spent the same amount of time in prison as he would be required to serve if sentenced.

However, upon release Tarhan was again told to serve in the military. When he refused, he was again arrested and placed on trial. This time he was sentenced to four years in prison. Tarhan began serving his prison sentence in late 2005. He was unexpectedly released in March 2006. This release is believed to be political in nature due to international pressure becoming bad publicity, as he has not been acquitted and still considered to be "at large"; he can be recaptured and re-imprisoned at the whim of the authorities.

According to Tarhan's sister, Emine Tarhan, Tarhan had been tortured in prison and his life threatened by other inmates.

== International response ==
Protests in support of Tarhan have been held around the world. and his imprisonment has attracted the attention of organizations like Amnesty International.

Turkish author and poet Perihan Magden was prosecuted and acquitted in Turkey for writing a column in support of Tarhan and his call for conscientious objection.

== Further reading about conscientious objection in Turkey ==
- United Nations HCR report on military service in Turkey
- WRI summary on conscientious objection in Turkey
- Documentation: Conscientious objection in Turkey
