= Conscription in Turkey =

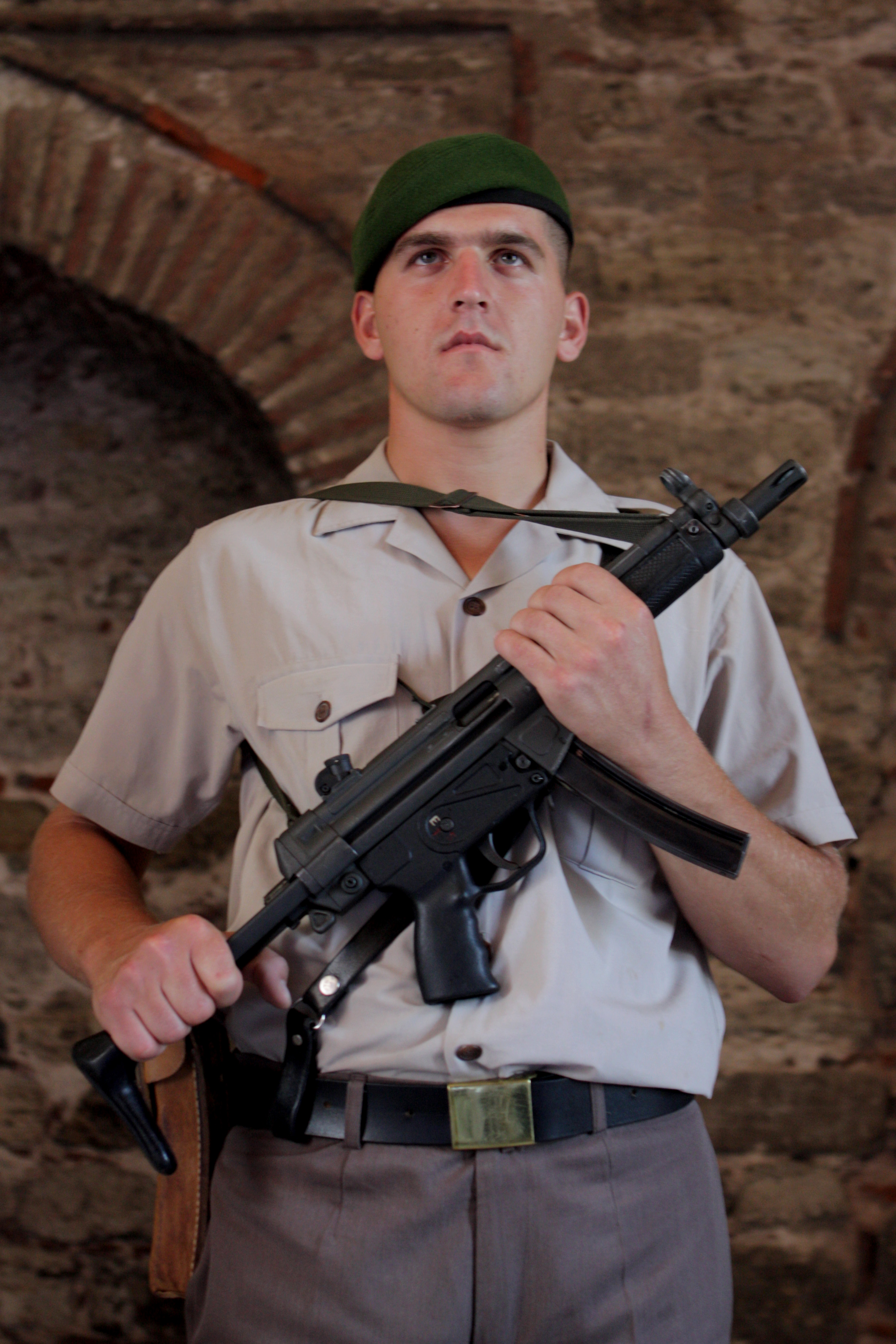
A Turkish conscript gendarmerie on guard at Topkapı Palace in Istanbul

In Turkey, compulsory military service applies to all male citizens from 20 to 41 years of age. It is 6-month for all males regardless of education degree. Although a 12-month paid CO or NCO service, dependent on the level of education, is also available on-demand. A one-month service option bedelli is available in exchange of a certain fee, which also applies to the citizens who live abroad. For Turks with multiple citizenship, the conscription lapses if they have already served in the army of another country.

Conscripts can be deployed in all branches of the Turkish Armed Forces as reserves, except in combat operations or active conflicts. For example, only professional soldiers are used in operations by Turkey in the Turkey-PKK conflict.

Women are not conscripted, but are permitted to become officers and NCOs. LGBT members are exempt and drafted only on-demand.

== History ==
The Conscription Law, older than the Republic of Turkey itself, was introduced in 1914 and has stayed in force ever since. However, the length of service has been successively reduced over time. Between 1923 and 1980, the average length of service was 24–30 months dependent on the branch, except for the WWII-era law that required up to 40 months of service. Between 1980 and 2000, it was revised as 18 months for non-educated males and 15 months for those who had completed university education. In 2001, these lengths were reduced to 12 months for non-educated conscripts and 6 months for educated ones. In 2014, the current 6-month length of mandatory and 12-month on-demand service was introduced. In 2019, the paid exemption with only 1-month of service was introduced.

== Legislation ==
The rules and procedures for conscription are set out in the Military Service Law in accordance with Article 72 of the Turkish Constitution. Ministerial circulars set out the rules and procedures for exemption from military service in exchange for a financial contribution or other form of compensation, and for discharge from military service in exchange for working in other government agencies.

Articles 2, 25 and 26 of Turkey's Military Service Law stipulate that every man in Turkey must be conscripted and registered from 1 January of the year in which he turns twenty. Military service does not apply to women. A conscripted man is conscripted until 1 January of the year in which he turns 41. In the case of mobilization, men can be called up for military service up to the age of sixty-five. Turkish men legally residing abroad are required to do military service from the year they turn 19 until the end of the year they turn 38. Men who voluntarily enlist in the armed forces can do so from the age of eighteen. Turkish women can voluntarily serve in the Turkish army as non-commissioned officers or officers and in that case they can be called up as reservists until their forty-first year of life. Until 2014, the normal conscription period was fifteen months. Thereafter, the maximum conscription period was reduced to twelve months. There are different variants in the conscription system as used until the amendment of the law of 26 June 2019. For persons with two years of vocational training or a low level of education, the maximum conscription period of twelve months applies. Two variants apply to conscripts with four years of secondary school and higher education: either twelve months as an officer (Third Lieutenant), or a reduced conscription of six months as a non-commissioned officer.

== Registration and inspection ==
Each year, approximately 300,000 men over the age of twenty are called up for military service. According to 2018 data from the Turkish government, a total of 1.9 million young men have been deferred from military service because of their studies. Three million other men have asked for a postponement for other reasons. An exception was 2017, the year after the coup attempt, when the Turkish government did not call on new conscripts to register. No professional soldiers were hired in that year either.

=== Call system ===
The Ministry of National Defense broadcasts the call for conscription through Turkish state radio and television. Anyone enlisting for the first time that year is called up, along with those who received a temporary exemption or deferment the previous year. Conscripts do not receive a personal call for registration. Everyone who has completed his military service remains a reservist up to the upper limit described. People are expected to respond to the call by presenting themselves with the necessary documents at one of the military registration offices, or in case of residence abroad, at the Turkish consulate or embassy.

If a person has not responded to the general call to register and be examined for military service, the military authorities will send a notice to the address of the person concerned stating that the person concerned must still report to the military authorities in order to complete the relevant procedures. If the registration and examination of the person concerned has still not taken place by the time the other conscripts from the same year are due to take office, this constitutes an offence.

=== Examination ===
During the examination, an inventory is made of the conscript's state of health, level of education, profession and special skills such as knowledge of languages. The military registration office sends the conscript a written notification that information about attendance can be obtained from the office. Nowadays, conscripts can also look up this information digitally.

=== Documents ===
The legislation makes no mention of the specific time when certain turnout-related documents are provided to conscripts. The only reference is that a military ID (askerlik cüzdanı) will be reinforced during the conscription. It is known that after a person is approved for military service, he receives a written notification from the military registration office stating that he can collect the documents regarding his registration and attendance at that office. These documents also state to which unit one has been assigned and to which training center one must report for basic military training. The Military ID is the official ID for members of the Turkish Armed Forces. Members of the armed forces are required to carry their military ID at all times, even if they are wearing civilian clothes. Conscripts receive the military ID at the beginning of their military service.

The general information collection system is linked to the authorities that issue passports, but also to other authorities, for example the police. As a result, conscription evaders and deserters can be apprehended in various situations, such as at the border or at traffic controls. A 2010 constitutional amendment allowed conscripts to travel out legally. The purport is that the freedom of Turkish nationals to leave the country may only be restricted on the basis of a court decision following a criminal investigation or prosecution. If the Turkish nationality is lost, the citizenship is also lost and one cannot serve in the army.

== Induction and placement ==
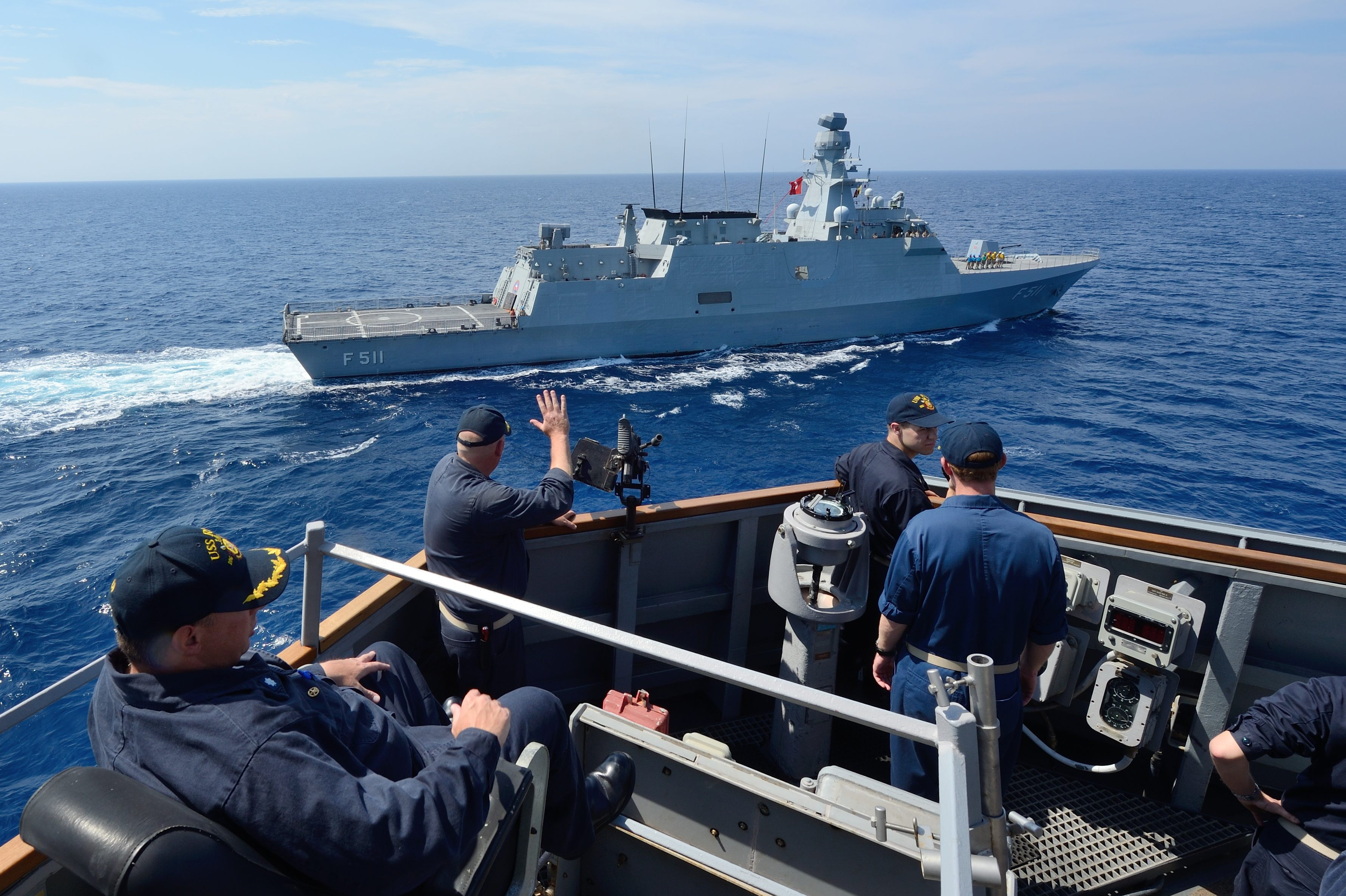
Turkish Navy

The Department of Defense's Directorate General of Drafting Services (ASAL) is responsible for conscript deployment planning. The information about the turnout such as location and date can be viewed by the conscript at the military district registration offices, and can now also be requested by the conscript via the online government website e-Devlet. Conscripts can only object to their placement on the grounds of health complaints.

=== Deployment of conscripts in armed conflicts ===
Turkish law does not discriminate between persons of different ethnicity or religion. This also applies to the rules regarding conscription and recruitment. The army stopped using conscripts in combat operations a few years ago. The military operations are only carried out by professional soldiers, both in southeastern Turkey and in Iraq and Syria. While this may have been the case in the 1990s and early 2000s, conscripts are no longer deployed in active conflict or military operations, including counter-terrorism operations.

=== Components of the Turkish military organization ===
The Turkish Armed Forces (TSK) consists of the army (Türk Kara Kuvvetleri), the navy (Türk Deniz Kuvvetleri; including the naval air force and infantry) and the air force (Türk Hava Kuvvetleri). Turkey has the largest army in NATO after the United States, with an estimated number of more than 615,000 on active duty or in reserve. Since the late 1990s, the proportion of professional soldiers and professionals within the armed forces has increased sharply to about fifty percent of the total number of active duty personnel. Conscripts are deployed in all parts of the TSK, including the Gendarmerie and Coast Guard, but not in elite units. Only professional soldiers are deployed in operations against armed groups such as the PKK.

According to statements by the Chief of Staff at the end of 2017, the army is the largest Turkish military unit with approximately 355,000 troops, including approximately 197,000 conscripts. The army consists of four armies (ordu), namely the First Army, stationed in Istanbul, the Second Army, stationed in the southeast with headquarters in Malatya, the Third Army, stationed in the northeast with headquarters in Erzincan and the Fourth Army (also known as the Aegean Army), stationed on the west coast with headquarters in İzmir. In addition to the Armed Forces that fall under the Ministry of Defence, there is the Gendarmerie. Conscripts can also be posted to the gendarmerie. The gendarmerie (Jandarma Genel Komutanlığı) falls under the Ministry of Defense as far as training and education are concerned.

== Postponement, exemption and alternative service ==
=== Postponement ===
Deferral of military service can be obtained on the basis of law 1111, article 35:

- On request due to indispensability if one works for the government, (defense) industry, or as a sports professional (article 35 e);
- If one is still studying, in that case universities will apply for a standard deferral for their students (article 35 f);
- When working abroad (Article 35 g);
- In case of poor health (with doctor's statement)

One can also request a deferment of conscription because of being held in detention. As a rule, a postponement is requested for one year, which can be extended by one year upon presentation of the correct documents. The Turkish Military Service Law allows conscripted students to first complete their university education (until the year they turn 30) or postgraduate training and research (up to the year they turn 36). Depending on the situation, the person requesting a deferral must provide evidence to the military district registry office that reviews the deferral application. This includes, for example, medical reports, documents from the educational institution, or a document explaining the reasons for detention. These documents form the basis for approving or rejecting the postponement request

Turks abroad who cannot participate in military service for medical reasons must undergo a medical examination at a hospital recognized by the Turkish consulate or embassy. The medical evaluation report approved by a consulate or embassy is shared with the Ministry of Defense, which decides on individual cases. In case of objection to this decision, a subsequent medical examination can be carried out in a military hospital in the country concerned. Persons who have been granted a postponement of conscription will receive a written statement about this from the military registration office.

=== Exemption ===
The Military Service Act sets out that persons who are physically or mentally unfit for military service can be exempted from conscription. To obtain this exemption, one must submit a medical report. In the event of non-complete disapproval due to physical condition, the person will have to undergo renewed checks every two years during the period of service to ensure that they are still unfit to stand.

Conscript brothers of conscripts who died in combat automatically receive an exemption from military service. The same applies to brothers and sons of conscripts who die in a terrorist attack during their military service. Turkish citizens who obtained their citizenship through naturalization and who completed their military service in their country of origin can, on application, be exempted from Turkish military service. It is also possible to be exempted from military service by reporting that one is homosexual. Until 2015 conscripts seeking exemption on grounds of homosexuality were commonly required to undergo rectal examination and to submit explicit photographic or video evidence of sexual acts to a military medical board. Reporting from late 2015 indicates the military quietly amended its practice so that a conscript's own declaration, together with observed behaviour, became sufficient grounds for exemption, without a requirement for physical examination or photographic proof.

=== Paid exemption (bedelli) ===
On 25 June 2019, the Turkish parliament approved the government's proposal to amend the law on military service. All Turkish conscripts residing in Turkey must follow a one-month basic military training. After that month, a conscript can be exempted from the remaining conscription by paying a certain amount. The amounts in may be adjusted semi-annually in connection with inflation. Conscripts residing abroad do not have to follow a month's military training after the buy-out of their conscription. However, prior to the surrender of military service, they must follow an online course from the Turkish Ministry of Defense.

== Evasion ==
The Military Service Act distinguishes between three types of evasion of military service (asker kaçaklıǧı):

- Evasion of registration/examination (yoklama kaçaklığı)
- Evasion of enlistment (bakaya)
- Desertion (firar)

Withdrawal from registration and attendance is considered a refusal to conscription and is punishable by law. In practice, the Turkish authorities often impose a lighter sentence than the harshest possible measure of imprisonment. The European Bureau for Conscientious Objection (EBCO) indicates that nowadays in Turkey conscientious objectors are not detained because of their refusal to perform military service. A fine is imposed instead. As long as conscientious refusal continues, those involved run the risk of being fined again and from a legal point of view there is still the possibility of being sentenced to a prison sentence. The Turkish Military Penal Code (Article 63) sets out the system of penalties for refusing military service. If a conscript still has not registered and/or has been examined before the attendance date of those who were called up in the same year, this constitutes an offence. The article distinguishes between people who report themselves and people who are arrested. People who turn themselves in within seven days face a maximum of one month in prison, while those apprehended within seven days face a maximum of three months in prison.

Articles 50 and 51 of the Turkish Military Penal Code indicate that the court may convert prison sentences of less than one year into a fine. In addition, prison sentences of less than two years may be conditionally suspended by a judge. In case of desertion, higher penalties apply to both conscripts and professional soldiers.

=== Conscientious objection ===
Similar to Israel and South Korea, Turkey does not recognize the right of conscientious objection (vicdani retçi). There is no possibility under Turkish law for exemption from military service for conscientious objections, including objections for religious reasons. Refusing to serve is illegal. Turkey has no alternative military service.

== Attitude towards conscription, the army and conscripts (draftees) ==
Most companies require men to have completed their military service before their job candidacies can be accepted. Previously, families would not (or would only seldom) consent to their daughters marrying men who have not served their terms, however, this has significantly changed since the 2010s. The reason behind this requirement is an irregular loss of workforce; the companies are legally bound to discharge draft evaders or face legal consequences, however valuable an asset these people are. It is a common opinion that having completed military service carries a symbolic value to the majority of Turks. It is commonly regarded as a rite of passage to manhood, and most men grow up with the anticipation of serving out their time.

On the other hand, it is held to be one of the main reasons behind the brain drain prevalent among well-educated young professionals.

== The economics of conscription ==
Turkish Economics Professor Cevdet Akçay has stated that conscription always results in a net loss of wealth for any country, and that politicians do not discuss the topic of conscription based on objective and logical arguments. Akçay states: "One side might say that, mandatory military service is a net loss for our economy and therefore I don't support it. Whereas the other side might support it despite its effect on the economy and explain their reasons, but such discussion does not happen in our country." Though, the paid-exemption option was chosen by nearly 2 million draftees and since 2011, the collected fees have contributed more than US$10 billion into armed forces' budget.
