= European Bureau for Conscientious Objection =

Umbrella organisation for national associations of conscientious objectors

The European Bureau for Conscientious Objection (EBCO) is a European umbrella organisation for national peace organisations supporting conscientious objectors. Its seat is in Brussels and it was founded in 1979. It aims to organise solidarity campaigns for conscientious objectors facing legal charges in European countries and to lobby for such rights in European institutions. Together with War Resisters' International, which is also one of its members, it is considered one of the leading international NGOs working on conscientious objection.

== Objectives ==
EBCO stands up for the right of conscientious objectors, who claim this right as a human right, to abstain from warfare, its preparations or any other military activity on a national and an international level. It lobbies for the right to asylum for conscientious objectors whose governments do not recognise their objections. It promotes cuts to military budgets in favour of social spending, the immediate cessation of the recruitment and of minors into the armed forces, the abolition of conscription, and the introduction of peace education in the education system.

== Activities ==
The organisation creates a network between national organisations from Belgium, Bulgaria, Cyprus, France, Finland, Georgia, Germany, Greece, Italy, Lithuania, Russia, Spain, Switzerland, Turkey, Ukraine and the United Kingdom. As of October 2023, Alexia Tsouni from Germany acts as the organisation's president.

In 1985 EBCO along with War Resisters' International formally adopted the International Conscientious Objectors' Day (CO day), occurring on May 15, which celebrates those who have and continue to resist war and participation in military structures, and propelled it to worldwide recognition.

The organisation lobbied for European countries to sign and ratify the Optional Protocol on the Involvement of Children in Armed Conflict to the Convention on the Rights of the Child.

EBCO produces reports and conducts research on conscientious objection in Europe through. Since at least 2008, it writes an annual report on conscientious objection and civilian service for the European Parliament Committee on Civil Liberties, Justice and Home Affairs.

EBCO has participatory status with the Council of Europe since 1998. Since 2005, it is also a member of the INGOs Conference of the Council of Europe. Since 1995, it is a full member of the European Youth Forum.

Since 2021, EBCO has adhered to and utilised the International Standards on Conscientious Objection to Military Service, published in the same year by the Quaker United Nations Office, available in English, Spanish, Russian and French. The paper outlines the ways in which conscientious objection has been recognised and protected through human rights mechanisms and treaties, accounting for developments in international standards that have occurred since 2015.
