= Conscientious objector =

Person refusing military service on moral grounds

A conscientious objector is an "individual who has claimed the right to refuse to perform military service" on the grounds of freedom of conscience or of religion. The term has also been extended to objecting to working for the military–industrial complex due to a crisis of conscience. In some countries, conscientious objectors are assigned to an alternative civilian service as a substitute for conscription or military service.

A number of organizations around the world celebrate the principle on May 15 as International Conscientious Objection Day.

On March 8, 1995, the United Nations Commission on Human Rights resolution 1995/83 stated that "persons performing military service should not be excluded from the right to have conscientious objections to military service". This was re-affirmed on April 22, 1998, when resolution 1998/77 recognized that "persons [already] performing military service may develop conscientious objections".

== History ==
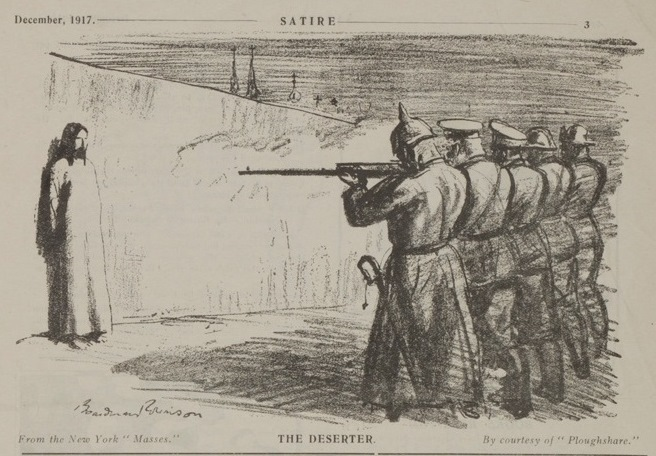
The Deserter by Boardman Robinson, The Masses, 1916

Many conscientious objectors have been executed, imprisoned, or otherwise penalized when their beliefs led to actions conflicting with their society's legal system or government. The legal definition and status of conscientious objection has varied over the years and from nation to nation. Religious beliefs were a starting point in many nations for legally granting conscientious objector status.

The earliest recorded conscientious objector, Maximilianus, was conscripted into the Roman Army in the year 295, but "told the Proconsul in Numidia that because of his religious convictions he could not serve in the military". He was executed for this, and was later canonized as Saint Maximilian.

An early recognition of conscientious objection was granted by William the Silent to the Dutch Mennonites in 1575. They could refuse military service in exchange for a monetary payment.

Formal legislation to exempt objectors from fighting was first granted in mid-18th-century Great Britain following problems with attempting to force Quakers into military service. In 1757, when the first attempt was made to establish a British Militia as a professional national military reserve, a clause in the Militia Ballot Act 1757 allowed Quakers exemption from military service.

In the United States, conscientious objection was permitted from the country's founding, although regulation was left to individual states prior to the introduction of conscription.

== International law ==
=== Universal Declaration of Human Rights ===
In 1948, the issue of the right to "conscience" was dealt with by the United Nations General Assembly in Article 18 of the Universal Declaration of Human Rights. It reads:

Everyone has the right to freedom of thought, conscience and religion; this right includes freedom to change his religion or belief, and freedom, either alone or in community with others and in public or private, to manifest his religion or belief in teaching, practice, worship and observance.

The proclamation was ratified during the General Assembly on 10 December 1948 by a vote of 48 in favour, 0 against, with 8 abstentions.

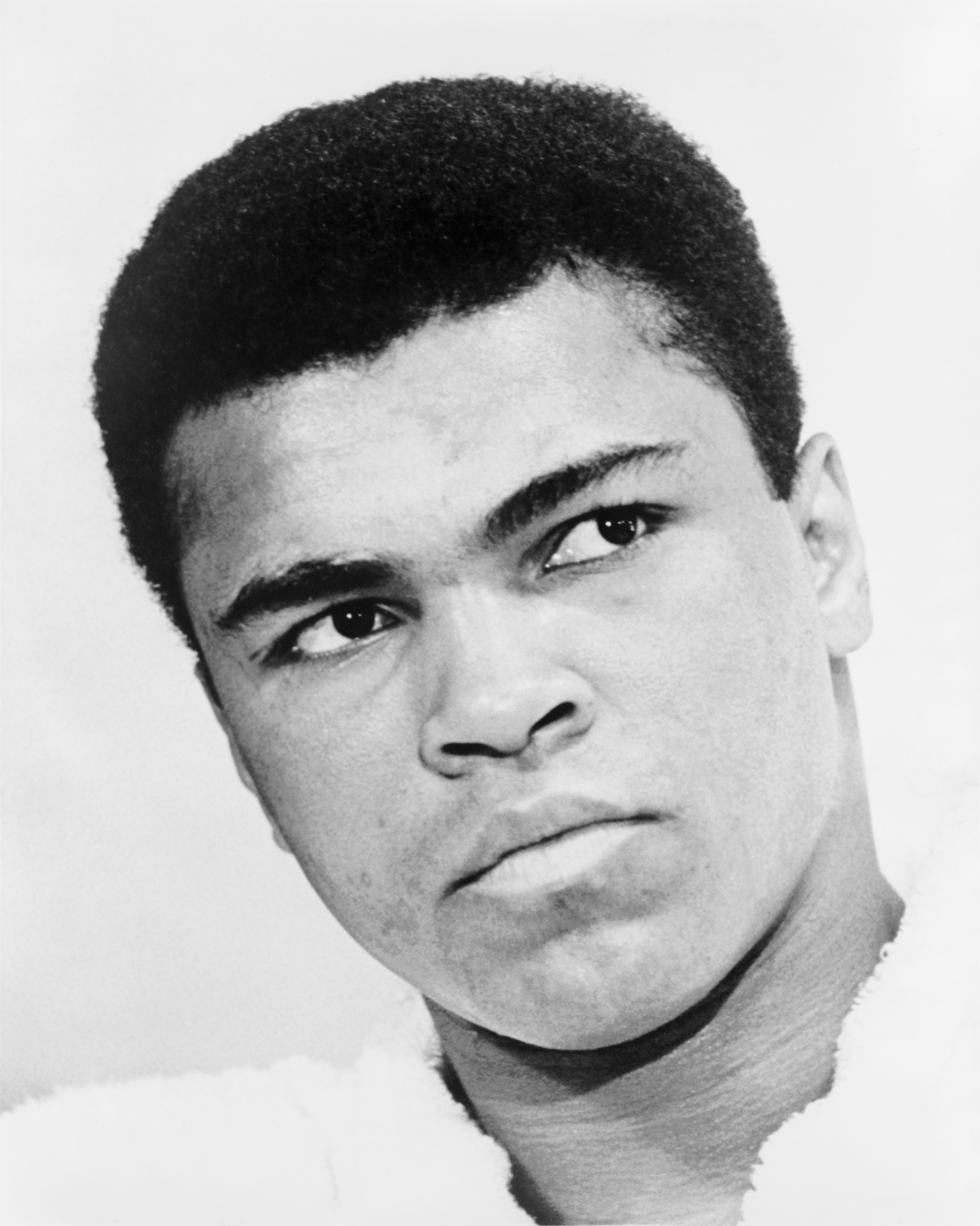
Refusing to serve in the Vietnam War, boxer Muhammad Ali stated, "I ain't got no quarrel with them Viet Cong ... They never called me nigger." in 1966

In 1974, the Assistant Secretary-General of the United Nations, Seán MacBride said, in his Nobel Lecture, "To the rights enshrined in the Universal Declaration of Human Rights one more might, with relevance, be added. It is 'The Right to Refuse to Kill'."

In 1976, the International Covenant on Civil and Political Rights entered into force. It was based on the Universal Declaration of Human Rights, and was originally created in 1966. Nations that have signed this treaty are bound by it. Its Article 18 begins: "Everyone shall have the right to freedom of thought, conscience and religion."

However, the International Covenant on Civil and Political Rights left the issue of conscientious objection inexplicit, as in this quote from War Resisters International: "Article 18 of the Covenant does put some limits on the right [to freedom of thought, conscience and religion], stating that [its] manifestations must not infringe on public safety, order, health or morals. Some states argue that such limitations [on the right to freedom of thought, conscience and religion] would [derivatively] permit them to make conscientious objection during time of war a threat to public safety, or mass conscientious objection a disruption to public order, ... [Some states] even [argue] that it is a 'moral' duty to serve the state in its military."

On 30 July 1993, explicit clarification of the International Covenant on Civil and Political Rights Article 18 was made in the United Nations Human Rights Committee general comment 22, Paragraph 11: "The Covenant does not explicitly refer to a right to conscientious objection, but the Committee believes that such a right can be derived from article 18, inasmuch as the obligation to use lethal force may seriously conflict with the freedom of conscience and the right to manifest one's religion or belief." In 2006, the committee has found for the first time a right to conscientious objection under article 18, although not unanimously.

In 1997, an announcement of Amnesty International's forthcoming campaign and briefing for the UN Commission on Human Rights included this quote: "The right to conscientious objection to military service is not a marginal concern outside the mainstream of international human rights protection and promotion."

In 1998, the Human Rights Commission reiterated previous statements and added "states should ... refrain from subjecting conscientious objectors ... to repeated punishment for failure to perform military service". It also encouraged states "to consider granting asylum to those conscientious objectors compelled to leave their country of origin because they fear persecution owing to their refusal to perform military service ..."

In 2001, Charter of Fundamental Rights of the European Union recognised the right to conscientious objection.

=== Handbook on Procedures and Criteria for Determining Refugee Status ===
The Handbook on Procedures and Criteria for Determining Refugee Status (the Handbook) of the Office of the United Nations High Commissioner for Refugees (UNHCR) states:

171. Not every conviction, genuine though it may be, will constitute a sufficient reason for claiming refugee status after desertion or draft-evasion. It is not enough for a person to be in disagreement with his government regarding the political justification for a particular military action. Where, however, the type of military action, with which an individual does not wish to be associated, is condemned by the international community as contrary to basic rules of human conduct, punishment for desertion or draft-evasion could, in the light of all other requirements of the definition, in itself be regarded as persecution.

== Selective conscientious objection ==
Air Commodore Lionel Charlton, of the British Royal Air Force (RAF), served in the military from 1898 to 1928. In 1923 he selectively refused to serve in the RAF Iraq Command. (He later went on to serve as Air Officer Commanding No 3 Group.)

On 4 June 1967, John Courtney Murray, an American Jesuit priest and theologian, delivered an address at Western Maryland College concerning a more specific type of conscientious objection: "the issue of selective conscientious objection, conscientious objection to particular wars, or as it is sometimes called, discretionary armed service."

On 8 March 1971, the Supreme Court of the United States ruled in the case of Gillette v. United States that "the exemption for those who oppose 'participation in war in any form' applies to those who oppose participating in all war and not to those who object to participation in a particular war only."

On 14 September 2003, in Israel, 27 reserve pilots and former pilots refused to serve in only specific missions. These specific missions included "civilian population centers" in "the [occupied] territories". These pilots clarified: "We ... shall continue to serve in the Israel Defense Forces and the Air Force for every mission in defense of the state of Israel."

On 25 May 2005, journalist Jack Random wrote the following: "The case of Sergeant Kevin Benderman (Iraq War Resister) raises the burning issue of selective conscientious objection: While it is universally accepted that an individual cannot be compelled against conscience to war in general, does the same hold for an individual who objects, in the depths of the soul, to a particular war?"

== Religious motives ==
Cases of behavior which could be considered as religiously motivated conscientious objection are historically attested long before the modern term appeared. For example, the Medieval Orkneyinga Saga mentions that Magnus Erlendsson, Earl of Orkney – the future Saint Magnus – had a reputation for piety and gentleness, and because of his religious convictions refused to fight in a Viking raid on Anglesey, Wales, instead staying on board his ship singing psalms.

The reasons for refusing to perform military service are varied. Many conscientious objectors cite religious reasons. Unitarian Universalists object to war in their sixth principle "The goal of world community with peace, liberty and justice for all". Members of the Historic Peace Churches such as Quakers, Anabaptists (Mennonites, Amish, Old Order Mennonite, Conservative Mennonites, the Bruderhof Communities and Church of the Brethren), as well as Holiness Pacifists such as the Reformed Free Methodist Church, Emmanuel Association of Churches, the Immanuel Missionary Church and Church of God (Guthrie, Oklahoma), object to war from the conviction that Christian life is incompatible with military action, because Jesus enjoins his followers to love their enemies and to refuse violence. The Book of Discipline of the Reformed Free Methodist Church teaches:

Militarism is contrary to the spirit of the New Testament and the teachings of Jesus Christ. Even from humanitarian principles alone, it is utterly indefensible. It is our profound and God-given conviction that none of our people be required to participate in war of any form and that these God-given convictions of our members be respected.

Since the American Civil War, Seventh-day Adventists have been known as non-combatants, and have done work in hospitals or to give medical care rather than combat roles, and the church has upheld the non-combative position. Jehovah's Witnesses and Christadelphians refuse to participate in the armed services on the grounds that they believe they should be neutral in worldly conflicts and often cite the latter portion of Isaiah 2:4 which states, "...neither shall they learn war anymore". Other objections can stem from a deep sense of responsibility toward humanity as a whole, or from simple denial that any government possesses the moral authority to command warlike behavior from its citizens.

The varied experiences of non-combatants are illustrated by those of Seventh-day Adventists when there was mandatory military service: "Many Seventh-day Adventists refuse to enter the army as combatants, but participate as medics, ambulance drivers, etc. During World War II in Germany, many SDA conscientious objectors were sent to concentration camps or mental institutions; some were executed. Some Seventh-day Adventists volunteered for the US Army's Operation Whitecoat, participating in research to help others. The Church preferred to call them "conscientious participants", because they were willing to risk their lives as test subjects in potentially life-threatening research. Over 2,200 Seventh-day Adventists volunteered in experiments involving various infectious agents during the 1950s through the 1970s in Fort Detrick, MD." Earlier, a schism arose during and after World War I between Seventh-day Adventists in Germany who agreed to serve in the military if conscripted and those who rejected all participation in warfare—the latter group eventually forming a separate church (the Seventh Day Adventist Reform Movement).

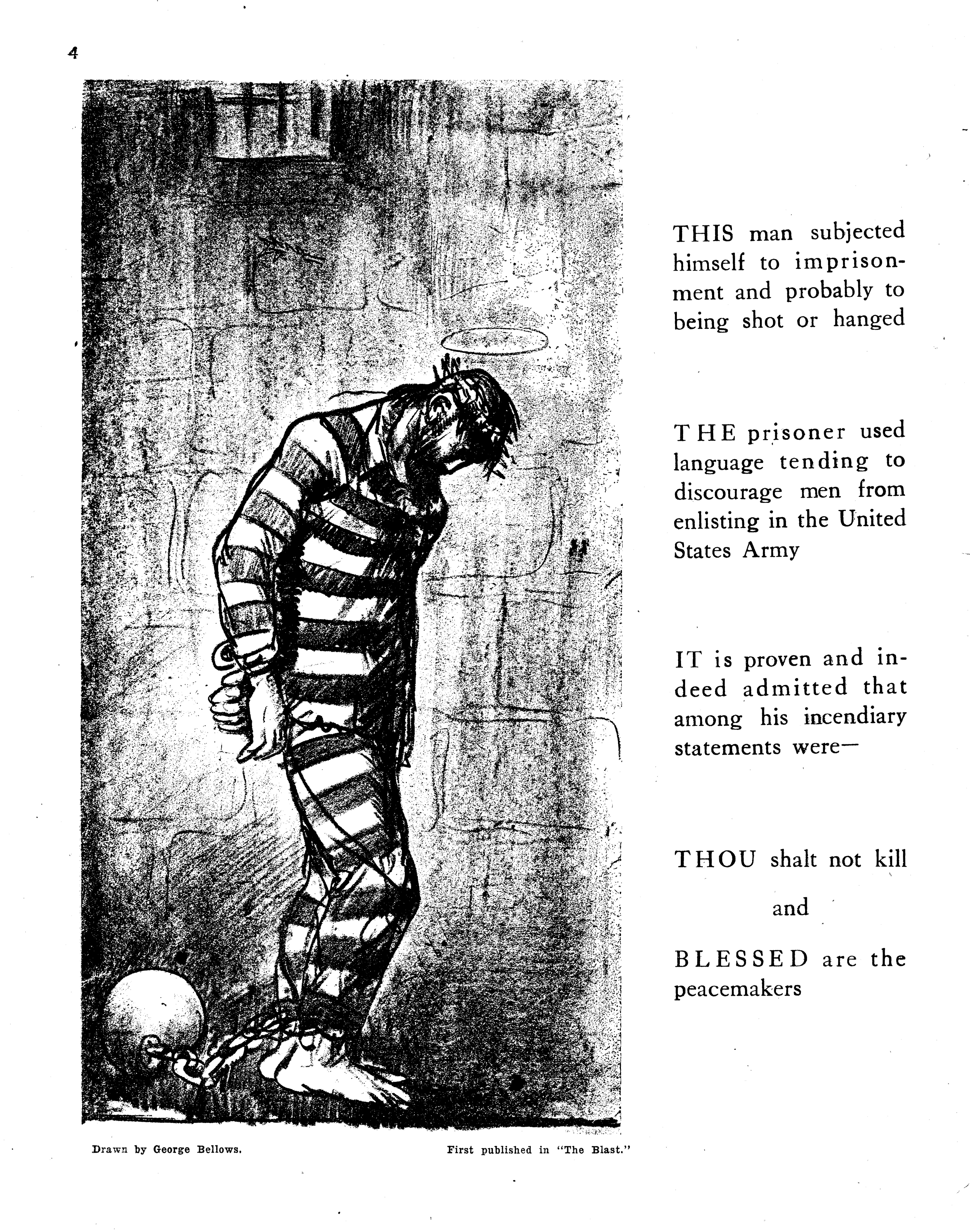
Blessed are the Peacemakers (1917) by George Bellows

In the early Christian Church followers of Christ refused to take up arms.

In as much as they [Jesus' teachings] ruled out as illicit all use of violence and injury against others, clearly implied [was] the illegitimacy of participation in war ... The early Christians took Jesus at his word, and understood his inculcations of gentleness and non-resistance in their literal sense. They closely identified their religion with peace; they strongly condemned war for the bloodshed which it involved.

After the Roman Empire officially embraced Christianity, the just war theory was developed in order to reconcile warfare with Christian belief. After Theodosius I made Christianity an official religion of the Empire, this position slowly developed into the official position of the Western Church. In the 11th century, there was a further shift of opinion in the Latin-Christian tradition with the crusades, strengthening the idea and acceptability of holy war. Objectors became a minority. Some theologians see the Constantinian shift and the loss of Christian pacifism as the great failing of the Church.

Ben Salmon was a Catholic conscientious objector during World War I and outspoken critic of Just War theology. The Catholic Church denounced him and The New York Times described him as a "spy suspect". The US military (in which he was never inducted) charged him with desertion and spreading propaganda, then sentenced him to death (this was later revised to 25 years hard labor). On June 5, 1917, Salmon wrote in a letter to President Wilson:

Regardless of nationality, all men are brothers. God is "our Father who art in heaven". The commandment "Thou shalt not kill" is unconditional and inexorable. ... The lowly Nazarene taught us the doctrine of non-resistance, and so convinced was he of the soundness of that doctrine that he sealed his belief with death on the cross. When human law conflicts with Divine law, my duty is clear. Conscience, my infallible guide, impels me to tell you that prison, death, or both, are infinitely preferable to joining any branch of the Army.

Nowadays, the Catholic Church teaches that "Public authorities should make equitable provision for those who for reasons of conscience refuse to bear arms; these are nonetheless obliged to serve the human community in some other way." (point 2311 of the Catechism of the Catholic Church)

Because of their conscientious objection to participation in military service, whether armed or unarmed, Jehovah's Witnesses have often faced imprisonment or other penalties. In Greece, for example, before the introduction of alternative civilian service in 1997, hundreds of Witnesses were imprisoned, some for three years or even more for their refusal. In Armenia, young Jehovah's Witnesses were imprisoned because of their conscientious objection to military service; this was discontinued in November 2013. The government of South Korea also routinely imprisoned Witnesses for refusing the draft before introduction of alternative service program in 2020. In Switzerland, virtually every Jehovah's Witness is exempted from military service.

For believers in Indian religions, the opposition to warfare may be based on either the general idea of ahimsa, nonviolence, or on an explicit prohibition of violence by their religion, e.g., for a Buddhist, one of the five precepts is "Pānātipātā veramaṇi sikkhāpadam samādiyāmi", or "I undertake the precept to refrain from destroying living creatures", which is in obvious opposition to the practice of warfare. The 14th Dalai Lama has stated that war "should be relegated to the dustbin of history". On the other hand, many Buddhist sects, especially in Japan, have been thoroughly militarized, warrior monks (yamabushi or sōhei) participating in the civil wars. Hindu beliefs do not go against the concept of war, as seen in the Gita. Both Sikhs and Hindus believe war should be a last resort and should be fought to sustain life and morality in society.

Followers of the Baháʼí Faith are advised to do social service instead of active army service, but when this is not possible because of obligations in certain countries, the Baháʼí laws include loyalty to one's government, and the individual should perform the army service.

Some practitioners of pagan religions, particularly Wicca, may object on the grounds of the Wiccan rede, which states "An it harm none, do what ye will" (or variations). The threefold law may also be grounds for objection.

A notable example of a conscientious objector was the Austrian devout Roman Catholic Christian Franz Jägerstätter, who was executed on August 9, 1943, for openly refusing to serve in the Nazi Wehrmacht, consciously accepting the penalty of death. He was declared Blessed by Pope Benedict XVI in 2007 for dying for his beliefs, and is viewed as a symbol of self-sacrificing resistance.

== Alternatives for objectors ==
Some conscientious objectors are unwilling to serve the military in any capacity, while others accept noncombatant roles. While conscientious objection is usually the refusal to collaborate with military organizations, as a combatant in war or in any supportive role, some advocate compromising forms of conscientious objection. One compromising form is to accept non-combatant roles during conscription or military service. Alternatives to military or civilian service include serving an imprisonment or other punishment for refusing conscription, falsely claiming unfitness for duty by feigning an allergy or a heart condition, delaying conscription until the maximum drafting age, or seeking refuge in a country which does not extradite those wanted for military conscription. Avoiding military service is sometimes labeled draft dodging, particularly if the goal is accomplished through dishonesty or evasive maneuvers. However, many people who support conscription will distinguish between "bona fide" conscientious objection and draft dodging, which they view as evasion of military service without a valid excuse.

Conservative Mennonites do not object to serving their country in peaceful alternatives (alternative service) such as hospital work, farming, forestry, road construction and similar occupations. Their objection is in being part in any military capacity whether noncombatant or regular service. During World War II and the Korean, Vietnam war eras they served in many such capacities in alternative I-W service programs initially through the Mennonite Central Committee and now through their own alternatives.

Despite the fact that international institutions such as the United Nations (UN) and the Council of Europe (CoE) regard and promote conscientious objection as a human right, as of 2004, it still does not have a legal basis in most countries. Among the roughly one-hundred countries that have conscription, only thirty countries have some legal provisions, 25 of them in Europe. In Europe, most countries with conscription more or less fulfill international guidelines on conscientious objection legislation (except for Greece, Cyprus, Turkey, Finland and Russia) today. In many countries outside Europe, especially in armed conflict areas (e.g. Democratic Republic of the Congo), conscientious objection is punished severely.

In 1991, The Peace Abbey established the National Registry for Conscientious Objection where people can publicly state their refusal to participate in armed conflict.

== Conscientious objection around the world ==
=== Belgium ===
Conscription was mandatory to all able-bodied Belgian males until 1994, when it was suspended. Civilian service was possible since 1963. Objectors could apply for the status of conscience objector. When granted, they did an alternative service with the civil service or with a socio-cultural organisation. The former would last 1.5 times as long as the shortest military service, the latter twice as long.

After their service, objectors are not allowed to take jobs that require them to carry weapons, such as police jobs, until the age of 42.

Since conscription was suspended in 1994 and military service is voluntary, the status of conscience objector can not be granted anymore in Belgium.

=== Canada ===
Mennonites and other similar peace churches in Canada were automatically exempt from any type of service during Canada's involvement in World War I by provisions of the Order in Council of 1873 yet initially, many were imprisoned until the matter was again resettled. With pressure of public opinion, the Canadian government barred entry of additional Mennonite and Hutterite immigrants, rescinding the privileges of the Order in Council. During Canada's involvement in World War II, Canadian conscientious objectors were given the options of noncombatant military service, serving in the medical or dental corps under military control or working in parks and on roads under civilian supervision. Over 95% chose the latter and were placed in Alternative Service camps. Initially the men worked on road building, forestry and firefighting projects. After May 1943, as the labour shortage developed within the nation and another Conscription Crisis burgeoned, men were shifted into agriculture, education and industry. The 10,700 Canadian objectors were mostly Mennonites (63%) and Dukhobors (20%).

=== Colombia ===
Conscientious objection is recognised in Colombia.

=== Czechoslovakia ===
In Czechoslovakia, those not willing to enter mandatory military service could avoid it by signing a contract for work lasting years in unattractive occupations, such as mining. Those who did not sign were imprisoned. Both numbers were tiny. After the communist party lost its power in 1989, alternative civil service was established. As of 2006, both the Czech Republic and Slovakia have abolished conscription. The Charter of Fundamental Rights and Freedoms in both countries now guarantees the right to refuse military service on grounds on conscience or religious belief.

=== Denmark ===
Any male getting drafted, but unwilling to serve, has the possibility to avoid military service by instead serving community service for the duration of the conscription. According to a poll from July 2011, 2 out of 3 Danes want conscription abolished.

=== Eritrea ===
There is no right to conscientious objection to military service in Eritrea – which is of an indefinite length – and those who refuse the draft are imprisoned. Some Jehovah's Witness conscientious objectors have been in jail since 1994.

=== Finland ===
Finland introduced conscription in 1881, but its enforcement was suspended in 1903 as part of Russification. During the Finnish Civil War in 1918, conscription was reintroduced for all able-bodied men. In 1922, the option of noncombatant military service was introduced, but service in the military remained compulsory on pain of imprisonment. After the struggle of pacifist Arndt Pekurinen a law was passed providing for a peacetime-only alternative to military service, or civilian service (Finnish siviilipalvelus). The law was dubbed "Lex Pekurinen" after him. During the Winter War, Pekurinen and other conscientious objectors were imprisoned, and Pekurinen was eventually executed at the front in 1941, during the Continuation War.

After the war, a conscientious objector's civilian service lasted 16 months, whereas military service was 8 months at its shortest. To qualify for civilian service, an objector had to explain his conviction before a board of inspection that included military officers and clergymen. In 1987, the duration of the service was shortened to 13 months and the board of inspection was abolished. In 2008, the term was further shortened to 12 months to match the duration of the longest military service (that of officer trainees and technical crew). Today, a person subject to conscription may apply for civilian service at any time before or during his military service, and the application is accepted as a matter of course. A female performing voluntary military service can quit her service anytime during the first 45 days, however, if she wants to quit after those 45 days she would be treated like a male and assigned to civilian service.

Persons who have completed their civilian service during peacetime have, according to the legislation enacted in 2008, the right to serve in non-military duties also during a crisis situation. They may be called to serve in various duties with the rescue services or other necessary work of a non-military nature. Persons who declare themselves to be conscientious objectors only after a crisis has started must, however, prove their conviction before a special board. Before the new legislation, the right to conscientious objection was acknowledged only in peacetime. The changes to the service term and to the legal status of objectors during a crisis situation were made as a response to human rights concerns voiced by several international bodies, who are overseeing the implementation of human rights agreements. These organisations had demanded Finland to take measures to improve its legislation concerning conscientious objectors, which they considered discriminatory. None of these organisations have yet raised concerns on the current legislation.

There are a small number of total objectors who refuse even civilian service, and are imprisoned for six months. This is not registered into the person's criminal record.

=== France ===
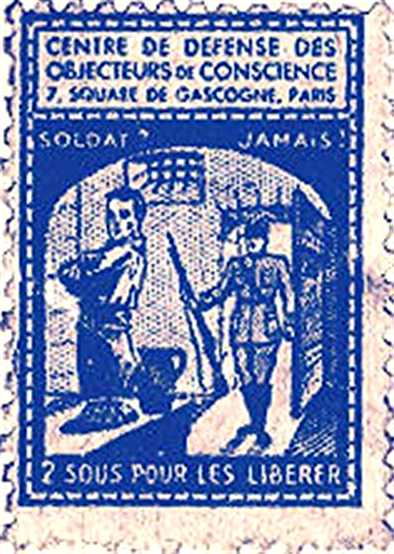
Stamp created by the Centre de défense des objecteurs de conscience (around 1936)

The creation of a legal status for conscientious objectors in France was the subject of a long struggle involving for instance or the much-publicised trials of Protestant activists Jacques Martin, Philippe Vernier and Camille Rombault in 1932–1933 or the hunger strike of anarchist Louis Lecoin in 1962.

The legal status law was passed in December 1963, 43 years (and many prison sentences) after the first requests.

In 1983, a new law passed by socialist Interior Minister Pierre Joxe considerably improved this status, simplifying the conditions under which the status would be granted. Conscientious objectors were then free to choose an activity in the social realm where they would spend their civil service time. However, in order to avoid too many applications for civil service at the expense of the military, the duration of the civil service is however kept twice as long as the military service.

The effect of these laws was suspended in 2001 when compulsory military service was abolished in France. The special prison at Strasbourg for Jehovah's Witnesses, who refuse to join any military, was also abolished.

Since 1986, the associations defending conscientious objection in France have chosen to celebrate their cause on 15 May.

=== Germany ===
==== Nazi Germany ====
In Nazi Germany, conscientious objection was not recognized in the law. In theory, objectors would be drafted and then court-martialled for desertion. The practice was even harsher: going beyond the letter of an already extremely flexible law, conscientious objection was considered subversion of military strength, a crime normally punished with death. On 15 September 1939, August Dickmann, a Jehovah's Witness, and the first conscientious objector of the war to be executed, died by a firing squad at the Sachsenhausen concentration camp. Among others, Franz Jägerstätter was executed after his conscientious objection, on the grounds that he could not fight for an evil force.

==== East Germany ====
After World War II in East Germany, there was no official right to conscientious objection. Nevertheless, and uniquely among the Eastern bloc, objections were accepted and the objectors assigned to construction units. They were however part of the military, so that a fully civilian alternative did not exist. Also, "construction soldiers" were discriminated against in their later professional life.

==== West Germany and reunified Germany ====
According to Article 4(3) of the German constitution: "No person may be forced against their conscience to perform armed military service. Details shall be regulated by a federal law."

According to Article 12a, a law may be passed to require every male from the age of 18 to military service called Wehrdienst; also, a law can require conscientious objectors to perform non-military service instead called Wehrersatzdienst, literally "military replacement service", or colloquially Zivildienst. These laws were applicable and demanded compulsory service in the German armed forces (German: Bundeswehr) until the abolition of draft in 2011. Initially, each conscientious objector had to appear in person to a panel hearing at the draft office (or contest a negative decision at the administrative court). The suspension of the procedure (1977), allowing to "object with a post card", was ruled unconstitutional in 1978. Beginning in 1983, competence was shifted to the Kreiswehrersatzamt (district military replacement office), which had discretion to either approve or reject a conscientious objection, which had to consist of a detailed written statement by an applicant giving reasons as to why the applicant was conscientiously objecting. This was generally just a formality, and objections were not often rejected. In later years in particular however, with the rise of the Internet, conscientious objections fell into disrepute because of the ease of being able to simply download existing example objections. It earned some conscientious objections the suspicion of an applicant simply attempting an easy way out of military service. On the other hand, certain organizations within the German peace movement had been offering pamphlets for decades giving suggestions to applicants as to the proper wording and structure of an objection which would have the greatest chances of success.

Following a 1985 Federal Constitution Court decision, Wehrersatzdienst could be no simple choice of convenience for an applicant, but he had to cite veritable conflict of conscience which made him unable to perform any kind of military service at all. If there was doubt about the true nature of an objector's application, he could be summoned to appear before a panel at the Kreiswehrersatzamt to explain his reasons in person. An approved conscientious objection in any case then meant that an applicant was required by law to perform Wehrersatzdienst. Complete objection both to military and replacement service was known as Totalverweigerung; it was illegal and could be punished with a fine or a suspended custodial sentence.

Nearly the only legal way to get both out of military service and replacement service was to be deemed physically unfit for military service. Both men who entered military service and those who wanted to go into replacement service had to pass a military physical examination at the military replacement office. Five categories/levels of physical fitness, or Tauglichkeitsstufen, existed. Tauglichkeitsstufe 5, in short T5, meant that a person was rejected for military service and thus also did not need to enter replacement service. T5 status was usually only granted if a person had physical or mental disabilities or was otherwise significantly impaired, such as due to very poor eyesight or debilitating chronic illnesses. However, in the last years of the draft, T5 was increasingly given to potential recruits with only minor physical or mental handicaps.

Another way to get out of service completely was the two brothers rule, which stated that if two older brothers had already served in the military, any following male children of a family were exempt from service.

Due to West Berlin's special status between the end of the Second World War and 1990 as a city governed by foreign military powers, draft did not apply within its borders. This made Berlin a safe haven for many young people who chose to move to the city to prevent criminal court repercussions for Totalverweigerung. As Totalverweigerer were often part of the far-left political spectrum, this was one factor which spawned a politically active left-wing and left-wing radical scene in the city.

Wehrersatzdienst was for a long time considerably longer than military service, by up to a third, even when the duration of service was gradually reduced following reunification and the end of the Cold War. This was held by some as a violation of constitutional principles, but was upheld in several court decisions based on the reasoning that former service personnel could be redrafted for military exercises called Wehrübungen, while somebody who had served out his replacement service could not. Moreover, work conditions under military service typically involved more hardship and inconvenience than Wehrersatzdienst. In 2004, military service and Wehrersatzdienst were then made to last equal lengths of time.

Military service and draft were controversial during much of their existence. Reasons included the consideration that Germans could be made to fight against their fellow Germans in East Germany. Moreover, draft only applied to men, which was seen as gender based discrimination by some, but was often countered by the argument that women usually gave up their careers either temporarily or permanently to raise their children. With the end of the Cold War and the German military's primary purpose of defending its home territory increasingly looking doubtful, draft also began to become more arbitrary, as only certain portions of a particular birth year were drafted (usually those in very healthy physical condition), while others were not. This was seen as a problem of Wehrgerechtigkeit, or equal justice of military service.

Then-German President Roman Herzog said in a 1994 speech (which was frequently cited as an argument for draft abolition) that only the necessity for national defense, not any other arguments can justify draft. On the other hand, this logic tended to not be extended to men serving Wehrersatzdienst, as they usually worked in fields of public health, elderly care, medical assistance or assistance for the disabled. Their relatively low-paid work was seen as an ever more important backbone of a health sector which was grappling with rapidly increasing costs of care.

In 2011 the mandatory draft was abolished in Germany, mainly due to a perceived lack of aforementioned necessity. The Bundeswehr now solely relies on service members who deliberately choose it as a career path. Neither Article 12a (establishing the possibility of draft) nor Article 4 (3) (permitting conscientious objection) have been removed from the German Constitution. In theory, this makes a full reversion to draft (and Wehrersatzdienst) possible, if it is thought to be necessary.

=== Hungary ===
Conscription was suspended in Hungary in 2004. Before being drafted anyone can apply for the status of conscientious objector and fulfill his duties in unarmed military service or civilian service.

=== Israel ===
All Israeli citizens and permanent residents are liable to military service. However, the Ministry of Defense has used its discretion under article 36 of this law to automatically exempt all non-Jewish women and all Arab men, except for the Druze, from military service ever since Israel was established. Israeli Arabs may volunteer to perform military service, but very few do so (except among the Bedouin population of Israel).

In discussing the status of the armed forces shortly after the founding of the State of Israel, representatives of orthodox religious parties argued against Haredi conscription in Israel and believed that yeshiva students should be exempt from military service. This derives from the Jewish tradition that if a man wants to dedicate his life to religious study, society must allow him to do so. The request of orthodox political parties to "prevent neglect of studying the Torah" was granted by the authorities and allowed for non-conscription. But in recent years this exemption practice has become the subject of debate in Israeli society, as the absolute and the relative numbers of the men who received this exemption rose sharply. Haredi exemptions for military service rose "from 800 men in 1968 to 41,450 in 2005 compared to 7 million for the entire population of Israel. In percentage terms, 2.4% of the soldiers enlisting to the army in 1974 were benefiting from exemptions compared to 9.2% in 1999, when it was projected that the number would reach 15% by 2012." In 2012, the Israeli Supreme Court ruled in the case of Ressler et al. v. The Knesset et al.. that the blanket exemption granted to ultra-Orthodox yeshiva students was ultra vires the authority of the Minister of Defence, and that it violated Basic Law: Human Dignity and Liberty and was, therefore, unconstitutional.

As for conscientious objection, in 2002, in the case of David Zonschein et al. v. Military Advocate General et al., the Supreme Court reiterated its position that selective conscientious objection was not permitted, adding that conscientious objection could only be recognized in cases of general objection to military service.

Women can claim exemption from military service on grounds of conscience under arts. 39 (c) and 40 of the Defense Service Law, according to which religious reasons can be grounds for exemption.

=== Italy ===
Until 2004 conscription was mandatory to all able-bodied Italian males. Those who were born in the last months of the year typically used to serve in the Navy, unless judged unable for ship service (in this case they could be sent back to Army or Air Force). Until 1972, objectors were considered as traitors and tried by a military tribunal; after 1972, objectors could choose an alternative civilian service, which was eight months longer than standard military service (fifteen months, then twelve, as for Army and Air Force, 24 months, then eighteen, then twelve as for the Navy). Since such length was judged too punitive, an arrangement was made to make the civilian service as long as the military service. Since 2004, Italian males no longer need to object because military service has been turned into volunteer for both men and women.

=== Marshall Islands ===
In the Republic of the Marshall Islands no person can be conscripted if, after being afforded a reasonable opportunity to do so, he has established that he is a conscientious objector to participation in war (Marshall Islands Constitution Article II Section 11).

=== The Netherlands ===
Conscription was mandatory to all able-bodied Dutch males until 1 May 1997, when it was suspended. The law on conscientious objections to military service has been active since 27 September 1962. Objectors have to perform duties in the civil service, to be provided by government services, or by institutions designated for employment of conscientious objectors designated by the Secretary of Social Affairs and Employment, who work in the public interest.

=== New Zealand ===
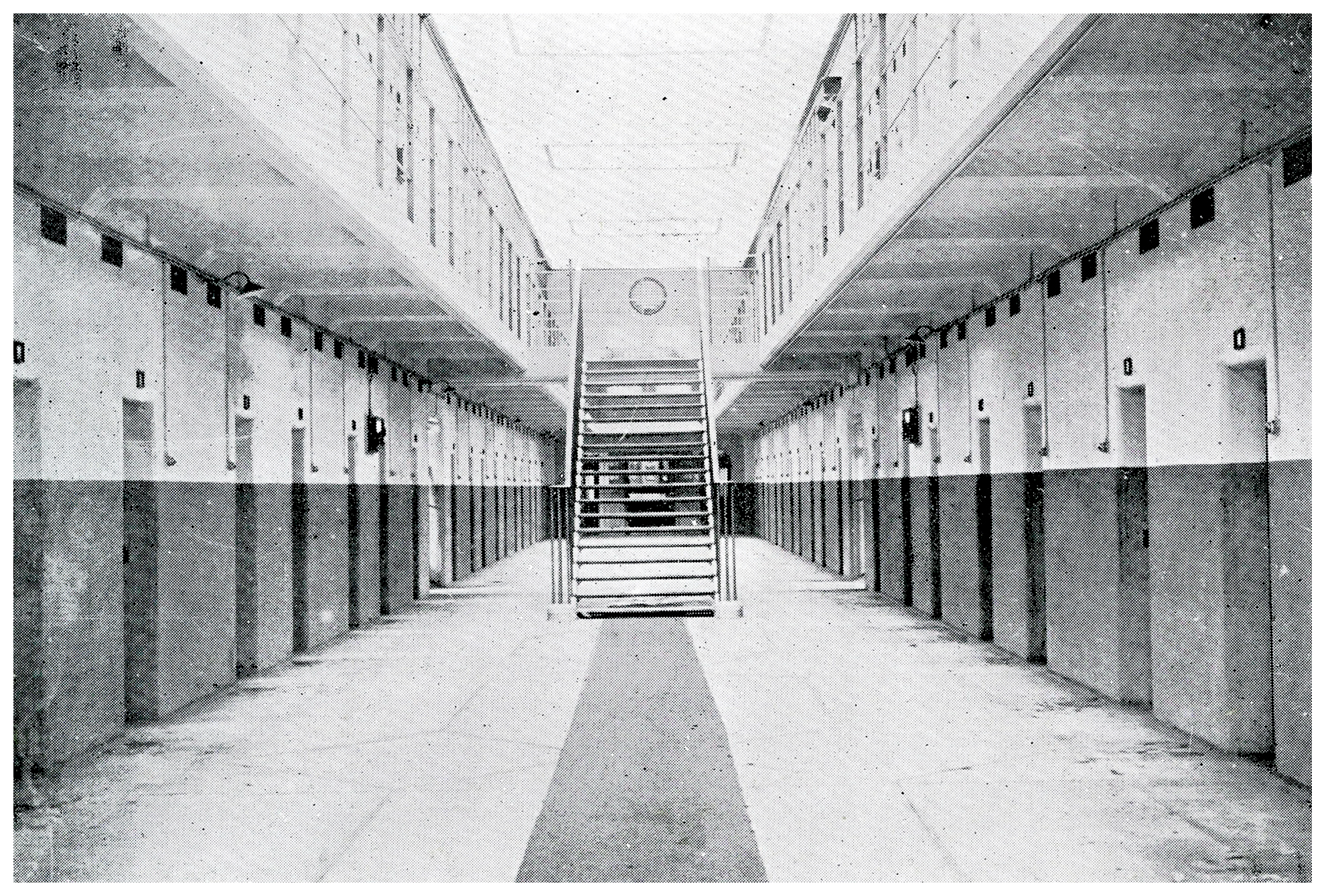
Waikeria Prison for WW1 objectors, c. 1923

In 1916 conscription was introduced in New Zealand, with only Quakers, Christadelphians, and Seventh-day Adventists having automatic exemption from the conscription. During the First World War, between 1,500 and 2,000 objectors and defaulters were convicted, or came under state control, for their opposition to war. At least 64 of these were still at Waikeria Prison on 5 March 1919 – some of whom had gone on hunger strike in protest.

Also during the First World War fourteen objectors, including Archibald Baxter, were forcibly sent to the front lines and were subject to Field Punishment No. 1, which "involved being tethered tightly by the wrists to a sloping pole to ensure their bodies hung with their hands taking all their weight."

During World War Two, conscription was re-introduced in 1940 and 5000 men applied for an exemption on the grounds of conscientious objection. Of these, 800 were imprisoned for the length of the war, and were barred from voting for ten years when they were released following the end of the war.

In the contemporary setting, there is no statute or case law which deal with conscientious objection. But, the OHCHR believes that the Bill of Rights Act 1990 and the ratification of Universal Declaration of Human Rights and the International Covenant on Civil and Political Rights creates a legal framework which enables conscientious objection.

=== Rhodesia ===
The white minority government of Rhodesia and white Rhodesian society had little tolerance for conscientious objectors to the country's national service scheme during the Rhodesian Bush War. In 1972 none of the 34 applicants for conscientious objector status were approved. Men who refused to undertake national service due to their beliefs were jailed or fined. In 1973 a juvenile was caned for conscientious objection. By 1978 it was also an offence to advocate for conscientious objection.

=== Romania ===
In Romania, as of 23 October 2006 conscription was suspended, therefore, the status of conscience objector does not apply. This came about due to a 2003 constitutional amendment which allowed the parliament to make military service optional. The Romanian Parliament voted to abolish conscription in October 2005, with the vote formalizing one of many military modernization and reform programs that Romania agreed to when it joined NATO.

=== Russia ===
The Russian Empire allowed Russian Mennonites to run and maintain forestry service units in South Russia in lieu of their military obligation. The program was under church control from 1881 through 1918, reaching a peak of seven thousand conscientious objectors during World War I. An additional five thousand Mennonites formed complete hospital units and transported wounded from the battlefield to Moscow and Ekaterinoslav hospitals.

After the Russian Revolution of 1917, Leon Trotsky issued a decree allowing alternative service for religious objectors whose sincerity was determined upon examination. Vladimir Chertkov, a follower of Leo Tolstoy, chaired the United Council of Religious Fellowships and Groups, which successfully freed 8000 conscientious objectors from military service during the Russian Civil War. The law was not applied uniformly and hundreds of objectors were imprisoned and over 200 were executed. The United Council was forced to cease activity in December 1920, but alternative service was available under the New Economic Policy until it was abolished in 1936. Unlike the earlier forestry and hospital service, later conscientious objectors were classified "enemies of the people" and their alternative service was performed in remote areas in a gulag-like environment in order to break their resistance and encourage enlistment.

In the present day, Russian draft legislation allows people to choose an alternative civilian service for religious or ideological reasons. Most objectors are employed in healthcare, construction, forestry and post industries, serving 18 to 21 months.

=== Serbia ===
Serbia introduced civil service for Conscientious objectors in 2009. The service lasted 9 months and people serving were tasked with helping out in government facilities such as post offices, kindergartens, hospitals etc. In 2020 during COVID-19 they were called to help prepare military hospitals for the influx of military and civilian patients. When civil service was introduced the mandatory military service period was reduced from 12 months to 6 months. Mandatory military service was abolished in 2011.

=== South Africa ===
During the 1980s, hundreds of South African white males dodged the draft, refused the call-up or objected to conscription in the South African Defence Force. Some simply deserted, or joined organisations such as the End Conscription Campaign, an anti-war movement banned in 1988, while others fled into exile and joined the Committee on South African War Resistance. Most lived in a state of internal exile, forced to go underground within the borders of the country until a moratorium on conscription was declared in 1993. Opposition to the Angolan War, was rife in English-speaking campuses, and later the war in the townships became the focus of these groupings.

=== South Korea ===
The terminology "conscientious objector" technically has not existed in Korean dictionaries until recently. In fact, a significant majority of Korean citizens simply associate conscientious objectors with draft dodging, and are unaware of the fact that conscientious objector draftees in other westernized countries are required to serve in alternative services. Since the establishment of the Republic of Korea, thousands of conscientious objectors had no choice but to be imprisoned as criminals. Every year about 500 young men, mostly Jehovah's Witnesses, are arrested for refusing the draft.

South Korea's stance has drawn criticism from The U.N. Human Rights Committee, which argues that South Korea is violating article 18 of the ICCPR, which guarantees freedom of thought and conscience. In 2006, 2010, and again in 2011 the U.N. Human Rights Committee, after reviewing petitions from South Korean conscientious objectors, declared that the government was violating Article 18 of the ICCPR, the provision that guarantees the right to freedom of thought, conscience and religion.

The government's National Action Plan for the Promotion and Protection of Human Rights has not shown a clear stance on the pressing human rights issues such as, among other things, the rights of conscientious objectors to military service.

In September 2007, the government announced a program to give conscientious objectors an opportunity to participate in alternative civilian service. The program stipulates three years of civilian service that is not connected with the military in any way. However, that program has been postponed indefinitely after the succeeding administration took office in 2008.

The government argues that introducing an alternative service would jeopardize national security and undermine social equality and cohesion. This is amid an increasing number of countries which retain compulsory service that have introduced alternatives. In addition, some countries, including those with national security concerns, have shown that alternative service can be successfully implemented.

On 15 January 2009 the Korean Presidential Commission on Suspicious Deaths in the Military released its decision acknowledging that the government was responsible for the deaths of five young men, who were Jehovah's Witnesses and had forcibly been conscripted into the army. The deaths resulted from "the state's anti-human rights violence" and "its acts of brutality" during the 1970s that continued into the mid-1980s. This decision is significant since it is the first one recognizing the state's responsibility for deaths resulting from violence within the military. According to the commission's decision, "the beatings and acts of brutality committed against them by military officials were attempts to compel and coerce them to act against their conscience (religion) and were unconstitutional, anti-human rights acts that infringed severely upon the freedom of conscience (religion) guaranteed in the Constitution."

The records of conscientious objectors to military service are kept by a governmental investigative body as criminal files for five years. As a consequence, conscientious objectors are not allowed to enter a government office and apply for any type of national certification exam. It is also very unlikely that they will be employed by any company that inquires about criminal records.

Conscientious objectors ... often spend the rest of their lives tainted by their decision... Criminal records from draft dodging make it difficult for objectors to find good jobs and the issue of army service is often raised by potential employers during job interviews.

From 2000 to 2008, Korean Military Manpower Administration said that at least 4,958 men have objected to service in the military because of religious beliefs. Among those, 4,925 were Jehovah's Witnesses, 3 were Buddhists, and the other 30 refused the mandatory service because of conscientious objections other than religious reasons. Since 1950, there have been more than 16,000 Jehovah's Witnesses sentenced to a combined total of 31,256 years for refusing to perform military service. If alternative service is not provided, some 500 to 900 young men will continue to be added each year to the list of conscientious objectors criminalized in Korea.

In 2015, Lee Yeda was the first conscientious objector to be allowed to live in France via asylum.

In June 2018, the Constitutional Court ruled 6–3 that Article 5 of the country's Military Service Act is unconstitutional because it fails to provide an alternative civilian national service for conscientious objectors. As of 2018, 19,300 South Korean conscientious objectors had gone to prison since 1953. The Defense Ministry said it would honor the ruling by introducing alternative services as soon as possible.

On 1 November 2018, the Supreme Court of Korea decided that conscientious objection is a valid reason to refuse mandatory military service, and vacated and remanded the appellate court's decision finding a Jehovah's Witness guilty of the objection.

=== Spain ===
Conscientious objection was not permitted in Francoist Spain. Conscientious objectors usually refused to serve on religious grounds, such as being Jehovah's Witnesses, and were placed in prison for the duration of their sentences. The Spanish Constitution of 1978 acknowledged conscientious objectors. The Spanish parliament established a longer service (Prestación Social Sustitutoria) as an alternative to the Army. In spite of this, a strong movement appeared that refused both services. The Red Cross was the only important organisation employing objectors. Because of this, the waiting lists for the PSS were long, especially in areas like Navarre, where pacifism, Basque nationalism and a low unemployment rate discouraged young males from the army. Thousands of insumisos (non-submittants) publicly refused the PSS, and hundreds were imprisoned. In addition a number of those in the military decided to refuse further duties. A number of people not liable for military service made declarations of self-incrimination, stating that they had encouraged insumisión. The government, fearing popular reaction, reduced the length of service and instead of sentencing insumisos to prison declared them unfit for public service.

Fronting the decreasing birth rate and the popular opposition to an army seen as a continuating institution of one of the pillars of the dictatorship's regime, the Spanish government tried to modernise the model carried from the Franco era, professionalizing it and thus bringing an end to conscription by the end of 2001. The new army tried to provide an education for civilian life and participated in peace operations in Bosnia.

=== Taiwan ===
There is the possibility of avoiding military service by instead serving civilian services for the duration of the conscription.

=== Turkey ===
Conscientious objection is highly controversial in Turkey. Turkey and Azerbaijan are the only two countries refusing to recognize conscientious objection and sustain their membership in the Council of Europe. In January 2006, the European Court of Human Rights (ECHR) found Turkey had violated article 3 of the European Convention on Human Rights (prohibition of degrading treatment) in a case dealing with the conscientious objection of Osman Murat Ülke. In 2005, Mehmet Tarhan was sentenced to four years in a military prison as a conscientious objector (he was unexpectedly released in March 2006). Journalist Perihan Mağden was tried by a Turkish court for supporting Tarhan and advocating conscientious objection as a human right; but later, she was acquitted.

As of March 2011, there were 125 objectors including 25 female objectors in Turkey. Another 256 people of Kurdish origin also had announced their conscientious objection to military service. Conscientious objector İnan Süver was named a prisoner of conscience by Amnesty International.

On 14 November 2011, the Ministry of Justice announced a draft proposal to legalise conscientious objection in Turkey and that it was to take effect two weeks after approval by the President to the change. This decision to legalize by the Turkish government was because of pressure from the European Court of Human Rights. The ECHR gave the Turkish government a deadline until the end of 2011 to legalize conscientious objection. The draft was withdrawn afterwards.

A commission was founded within the National Assembly of the Republic to write a new constitution in 2012. The commission is still in negotiations on various articles and conscientious objection is one of the most controversial issues.

=== United Kingdom ===
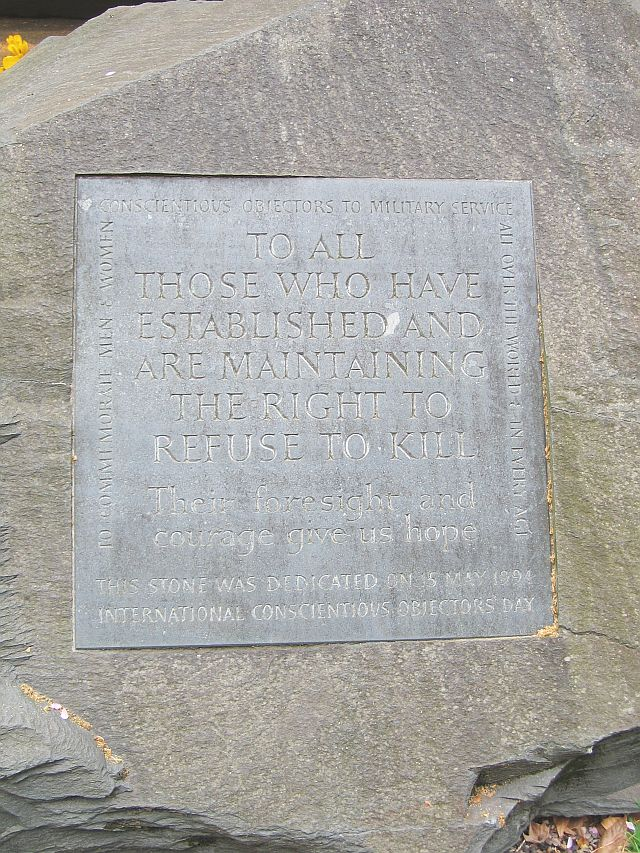
Conscientious Objector memorial in Tavistock Square Gardens, London—dedicated on 15 May 1994

The United Kingdom recognised the right of individuals not to fight in the 18th century following major problems with attempting to force Quakers into military service. The Militia Ballot Act of 1757 allowed Quakers to be excluded from service in the Militia. It then ceased to be a major issue, since Britain's armed forces were generally all-volunteer. Press gangs were used to strengthen army and navy rolls on occasions from the 16th to the early 19th centuries. Pressed men did have the right of appeal, in the case of sailors, to the Admiralty. The Royal Navy last took pressed men during the Napoleonic Wars.

A more general right to refuse military service was not introduced until the First World War. Britain introduced conscription with the Military Service Act of January 1916, which came into full effect on 2 March 1916. The Act allowed for objectors to be absolutely exempted, to perform alternative civilian service or to serve as a non-combatant in the army Non-Combatant Corps, according to the extent to which they could convince a Military Service Tribunal of the quality of their objection.

Around 16,000 men were recorded as conscientious objectors, with Quakers, traditionally pacifist, forming a large proportion: 4,500 objectors were exempted on condition of doing civilian "work of national importance", such as farming, forestry or social service; and 7,000 were conscripted into the specially-created Non-Combatant Corps. Six thousand were refused any exemption and forced into main army regiments; if they then refused to obey orders, they were court-martialled and sent to prison. Thus, the well-known pacifist and religious writer Stephen Henry Hobhouse was called up in 1916: he and many other Quaker activists took the unconditionalist stand, refusing both military and alternative service, and on enforced enlistment were court-martialled and imprisoned for disobedience. Conscientious objectors formed only a tiny proportion of Military Service Tribunals' cases over the conscription period, estimated at 2 per cent. Tribunals were notoriously harsh towards conscientious objectors, reflecting widespread public opinion that they were lazy, degenerate, ungrateful 'shirkers' seeking to benefit from the sacrifices of others.

In an attempt to press the issue, in May 1916 a group of thirty-five objectors, including the Richmond Sixteen, were taken to France as conscripts and given military orders, the disobedience of which would warrant a death sentence. These men, known as "The Frenchmen", refused; the four ringleaders were formally sentenced to death by court-martial but immediately reprieved, with commutation to ten-years' penal servitude.

Although a few objectors were accepted for non-combatant service in the Royal Army Medical Corps, acting as nursing/paramedic assistants, the majority of non-combatants served in the Non-Combatant Corps on non-lethal stores, road and railway building and general labouring in the UK and France. Conscientious objectors who were deemed not to have made any useful contribution to the state were formally disenfranchised (through a clause inserted in the Representation of the People Act 1918 at the insistence of back-bench MPs) for the five years 1 September 1921 – 31 August 1926, but as it was a last-minute amendment there was no administrative machinery to enforce it, which was admitted to be a "dead letter".

Britain's conscription legislation of 1916 did not apply to Ireland, despite it then being part of the United Kingdom. In 1918 the Army's manpower shortage led to passing a further act enabling conscription in Ireland if and when the government saw fit. In the event, the government never saw fit, although the legislation led to the Conscription Crisis of 1918. British conscription in the Second World War did not apply to Northern Ireland. Many Irishmen volunteered to fight in both world wars. The various parts of the British Empire and Commonwealth had their own laws: in general, all the larger countries of the Empire participated, and some were, in proportion to their population, major participants in the First World War.

In the Second World War, following the National Service (Armed Forces) Act 1939, there were nearly 60,000 registered Conscientious Objectors. Testing by tribunals resumed, this time by special Conscientious Objection Tribunals chaired by a judge, and the effects were much less harsh. If objectors were not a member of the Quakers or some similar pacifist organisation, it was generally enough to say that they objected to "warfare as a means of settling international disputes", a phrase from the Kellogg–Briand Pact of 1928. The tribunals could grant full exemption, exemption conditional on alternative service, exemption only from combatant duties, or dismiss the application. Of the 61,000 who were registered, 3,000 were given complete exemption; 18,000 applications were initially dismissed, but a number of such applicants succeeded at the Appellate Tribunal, sometimes after a "qualifying" sentence of three-months' imprisonment for an offence deemed to have been committed on grounds of conscience. Of those directed to non-combatant military service almost 7,000 were allocated to the Non-Combatant Corps, re-activated in mid-1940; its companies worked in clothing and food stores, in transport, or any military project not requiring the handling of "material of an aggressive nature". In November 1940 it was decided to allow troops in the NCC to volunteer for work in bomb disposal and over 350 men volunteered. Other non-combatants worked in the Royal Army Medical Corps. For conscientious objectors exempted conditional upon performing civil work, acceptable occupations were farm work, mining, firefighting and the ambulance service. About 5,500 objectors were imprisoned, most charged with refusal to attend a medical examination as a necessary preliminary to call-up after being refused exemption, and some charged with non-compliance with the terms of conditional exemption. A further 1,000 were court-martialled by the armed forces and sent to military detention barracks or civil prisons. Unlike the First World War, most sentences were relatively short, and there was no pattern of continually repeated sentences. The social stigma attached to 'conchies' (as they were called) was considerable; regardless of the genuineness of their motives, cowardice was often imputed.

Conscription in the United Kingdom was retained, with rights of conscientious objection, as National Service until the last call-up in 1960 and the last discharge in 1963. The use of all volunteer soldiers was hoped to remove the need to consider conscientious objectors. Ever since the First World War, there have been volunteer members of the armed forces who have developed a conscientious objection to service; a procedure was devised for them in the Second World War and with adaptations, it continues.

=== United States ===
At least two state constitutions have recognized an individual right not to bear arms. Pennsylvania's Constitution of 1790 states "Those who conscientiously scruple to bear arms, shall not be compelled to do so; but shall pay an equivalent for personal service." New Hampshire's Constitution of 1784 states "No person, who is conscientiously scrupulous about the lawfulness of bearing arms, shall be compelled thereto."

There are currently legal provisions in the United States for recognizing conscientious objection, both through the Selective Service System and through the Department of Defense. The United States currently recognizes religious and moral objections to all war, but not selective objections to specific wars. Conscientious objectors in the United States may perform either civilian work or noncombatant service in lieu of combatant military service.

Historically, conscientious objectors in the United States have faced significant challenges and, at times, persecution, particularly during major conflicts such as World War I, World War II, and the Vietnam War. Apart from many cases of harassment and social outcasting, individuals who refused to comply with draft board orders or to participate in approved alternative service were often subject to criminal prosecution and imprisonment. While some objectors served in noncombatant military roles, such as medics, others were assigned to civilian public service. In many cases, these individuals received no military pay or benefits, including those provided to their families, creating further hardship during their period of service.

Legal objections

In United States v. Seeger (1965), the Supreme Court expanded the interpretation of conscientious objection under the Universal Military Training and Service Act by ruling that individuals could qualify for exemption from military service based on deeply held moral or ethical beliefs, even if those beliefs were not grounded in traditional theistic religion.

In Welsh v. United States (1970), the Supreme Court extended the precedent set in Seeger by holding that a genuinely held moral or ethical opposition to war could qualify for conscientious objector status, even if the individual did not profess belief in a "Supreme Being." Elliot Ashton Welsh II, who refused induction based on deeply held pacifist convictions that he derived from a personal moral code rather than religious doctrine, was initially denied CO status and convicted. The Court reversed that conviction, affirming that § 6(j) of the Universal Military Training and Service Act encompasses sincere moral beliefs that function in a person's life like traditional religious beliefs. By recognizing non‑theistic yet deeply held convictions as eligible for exemption, Welsh further broadened the legal definition of religion and solidified protections for secular conscientious objectors.

In Gillette v. United States (401 U.S. 437), the Supreme Court held that conscientious objector status under the Military Selective Service Act is limited to individuals who oppose participation in all wars, not merely specific conflicts. The case involved Guy Gillette, who opposed the Vietnam War on moral grounds but did not claim pacifism in general. The Court ruled against him, reaffirming that the law does not protect selective objection. This decision clarified and limited the scope of Seeger and Welsh, drawing a firm legal line between universal pacifism, protected under U.S. law, and individual opposition to particular wars, which remains unrecognized in conscientious objector claims.

=== Switzerland ===
In Switzerland, conscientious objection is rooted in article 18 of the Federal Constitution, inscribed in 1874, though the practice dates to the 16th century among Anabaptists. Until 1927, objection was treated as desertion and severely punished. The 1927 Swiss Military Penal Code first distinguished it from desertion without decriminalization, while the 1950 revision provided modest concessions for religious and moral objectors. Support grew dramatically from the 1970s onward, with refusals to serve reaching 788 in 1984, prompting political debate on alternative civilian service.

Following two failed popular initiatives (1977, 1984), the 1990 "Barras reform" decriminalized conscientious objection and established civilian service as an alternative to military duty. A 1992 constitutional amendment (article 18, revised to article 59 in the 1999 Constitution) formally recognized this right, and the Civil Service Act took effect in 1996. Between 2011 and 2017, civilian service participants increased from 4,700 to 6,800, reflecting growing social acceptance. Subsequent attempts by centre-right parties to make civilian service less attractive failed in 2020.

=== Other countries ===
As of 2005, conscientious objectors in several countries may serve as field paramedics in the army (although some do not consider this a genuine alternative, as they feel it merely helps to make war more humane instead of preventing it). Alternatively, they may serve without arms, although this, too, has its problems. In certain European countries such as Austria, Greece and Switzerland, there is the option of performing an alternative civilian service, subject to the review of a written application or after a hearing about the state of conscience. In Greece, the alternative civilian service is twice as long as the corresponding military service; in Austria Zivildienst is one-third times longer, the Swiss Zivildienst is one and one-half times longer than military service. In 2005, the Swiss parliament considered whether willingness to serve one and a half times longer than an army recruit was sufficient proof of sincerity, citing that the cost of judging the state of conscience of a few thousand men per year was too great.

== Conscientious objection in professional forces ==
Only two European Union countries – Germany and the Netherlands – recognize the right to conscientious objection for contract and professional military personnel.

In the United States, military personnel who come to a conviction of conscientious objection during their tour of duty must appear in front of a panel of experts, which consists of psychiatrists, military chaplains and officers.

In Switzerland, the panel consists entirely of civilians, and military personnel have no authority whatsoever. In Germany, the draft has been suspended since 2011.

== See also ==
- International Conscientious Objectors' Day
- Antimilitarism
- Central Committee for Conscientious Objectors
- Center on Conscience & War
- Conscientious Objectors Commemorative Stone
- Conscientious objection to military taxation
- Conscription and sexism
- Counter-recruitment
- Franz Jägerstätter
- Friends' Ambulance Unit
- GI Rights Network
- Medical Cadet Corps
- Pax Christi
- Peace movement
- Peace Pledge Union
- Richmond Sixteen
- Selective conscientious objection
- Tax resistance
- Voluntaryism
- War resister
- War Resisters' International
- War Resisters League

== Further viewing ==
- Rick Tejada-Flores, Judith Ehrlich (2000), "The good war and those who refused to fight it"; Paradigm Productions in association with the Independent Television Service, aired on PBS.
- Catherine Ryan, Gary Weimberg (2008), "Soldiers of Conscience"; Luna Productions. Aired on the PBS nonfiction series POV.
- Molly Stuart, Amitai Ben-Abba (2019), "Objector"; Java Films. A documentary about Israeli conscientious objector Atalya Ben-Abba, premiered at IDFA. – "Objector". IMDb. 2019.
