= Kurdistan Workers' Party insurgency =

Armed conflict between Turkey and PKK

- Part of the Kurdish–Turkish conflict
Date	27 November 1978 – 12 May 2025 (46 years, 5 months, 2 weeks and 1 day)
Location	Eastern and Southeastern Turkey, spillovers in Northern Iraq, Northern Syria and Northwestern Iran
Result	2025 PKK–Turkey peace process: Arrest of Abdullah Öcalan on 15 February 1999 in Nairobi, Kenya.; Attempted peace process initiated in 2012, collapse in 2015.; Second peace process initiated in 2024; PKK declares ceasefire on 1 March 2025 and disbands 12 May

Belligerents
Turkey; Ministry of National Defense; General Staff; Special Forces Command; (Turkey) TAF; Turkish Air Force; Turkish Land Forces; Turkish Naval Forces; Ministry of Interior; Turkish National Police; Police Special Operations; Gendarmerie General Command; JİTEM (until early 1990s); JÖH; Village Guards; National Intelligence Organization; Other forces: Counter-Guerrilla (until 1992); Grey Wolves (not militarily involved); Turkish Revenge Brigade (not militarily involved); Some Kurdish tribes (incorporated into Village Guards in 1985)	Kurdistan Communities Union; PKK (until 2025); HPG; YJA-STAR; YDG-H: YPS; YPS-Jin; SDF; YPG; YPG International; YPJ; Anti-Terror Units; PJAK; YRK; HPJ; Sinjar Alliance; Êzîdxan Women's Units; Sinjar Resistance Units; HBDH; DKP; MKP-HKO-PHG; MLKP; THKP-C/MLSPB-DC; TKEP/L; TKP/ML; DK (until 2017) (Note: Merged with the Revolutionary Communard Party (DKP) in 2017.); International Freedom Battalion; Kurdish Hezbollah (1983–1991; 1998–2002) TAK

Commanders and leaders
Current commanders Recep Tayyip Erdoğan; Ali Yerlikaya; Yaşar Güler; Metin Gürak Past commanders: (Turkey) Osman Pamukoğlu; (Turkey) Fahri Korutürk; (Turkey) Kenan Evren; (Turkey) Turgut Özal; (Turkey) Süleyman Demirel; (Turkey) Ahmet Necdet Sezer; (Turkey) Abdullah Gül; (Turkey) Bülent Ecevit; (Turkey) Mesut Yılmaz; (Turkey) Necmettin Erbakan; (Turkey) Tansu Çiller; (Turkey) Yıldırım Akbulut; (Turkey) Bülend Ulusu; (Turkey) Işık Koşaner; (Turkey) İlker Başbuğ; (Turkey) Yaşar Büyükanıt; (Turkey) Hilmi Özkök; (Turkey) Hüseyin Kıvrıkoğlu; (Turkey) İsmail Hakkı Karadayı; (Turkey) Doğan Güreş; (Turkey) Necip Torumtay; (Turkey) Necdet Üruğ; (Turkey) Nurettin Ersin; (Turkey) Binali Yıldırım; (Turkey) Ahmet Davutoğlu; (Turkey) Ümit Dündar; (Turkey) Süleyman Soylu; (Turkey) Hulusi Akar; (Turkey) Musa Avsever	Current commanders Murat Karayılan; Mustafa Karasu; Duran Kalkan; Bahoz Erdal; Cemil Bayık Past commanders: Abdullah Öcalan (POW); Şemdin Sakık (POW); Osman Öcalan; Nizamettin Taş; Mahsum Korkmaz †; Kani Yılmaz †; Haki Karer †; Mazlum Doğan (POW); Halil Atac; Hüseyin Yıldırım; Celal Başkale †; Hülya Eroğlu †; Ali Haydar Kaytan †; Ayfer Kordu †; Zübeyir Aydar (POW); Haji Ahmadi

Strength
Turkish Armed Forces: 639,551 (2016): Gendarmerie: 148,700 (2009); Police: 225,000; Village Guards: 65,000 (2010); Total Force: 1,000,000+	YPG: 60,000–75,000; PKK: 32,800; PJAK: 1,000–3,000; TAK: A few dozen Currently: 116,000+ Total Served: 250,000+

Casualties and losses
1984–2024: 8,486 killed (per Turkey); Before 2015: 6,764 killed (per Turkey); 2015–present: 1,488 killed (per Crisis Group)	1976–2026: 22,660 killed (per PKK); Before 2015: 26,774 killed, 922 injured, 6,727 captured, 4,781 surrendered (per Turkey); 2015–present: 4,786 militants killed (per the Crisis Group); 40,000+ killed, captured, or surrendered (per Turkey)
- Civilian casualties: 5,478 killed (1984–2013, per Turkey); 631 killed since 2015 (per Crisis Group); 2,400–4,000 villages destroyed 500,000 Kurds displaced by 1996
- Kurdish Hezbollah (sometimes referred as Turkish Hezbollah) or just Hizbullah in Turkey, is a mainly Sunni Islamist militant organization, active against the Kurdistan Workers' Party (PKK) and the Government of Turkey.

From 1978 until 2025, the Republic of Turkey was in an armed conflict with the Kurdistan Workers' Party (PKK) (Kurdish: Partiya Karkerên Kurdistanê) as well as its allied insurgent groups, both Kurdish and non-Kurdish. The initial core demand of the PKK was its separation from Turkey to create an independent Kurdistan. In 2010, the PKK abandoned separatism in favor of autonomy and/or greater political and cultural rights for Kurds inside the Republic of Turkey.

Although most of the conflict took place in Northern Kurdistan, which corresponded with southeastern Turkey, the Kurdish-Turkish conflict spread to many other regions. The PKK's presence in Iraqi Kurdistan resulted in the Turkish Armed Forces carrying out frequent ground incursions and air and artillery strikes in the region, and its influence in Syrian Kurdistan led to similar activity there. The conflict cost the economy of Turkey an estimated $300 to 450 billion, mostly in military costs. It also had negative effects on tourism in Turkey.

A revolutionary group, the PKK was founded in 1978 in the village of Fis, Lice by a group of Kurdish students led by Abdullah Öcalan. The initial reason given by the PKK for this was the oppression of Kurds in Turkey. At the time, the use of Kurdish language, dress, folklore, and names were banned in Kurdish-inhabited areas. In an attempt to deny their existence, the Turkish government categorized Kurds as "Mountain Turks" during the 1930s and 1940s. The words "Kurds", "Kurdistan", or "Kurdish" were officially banned by the Turkish government. Following the military coup of 1980, the Kurdish language was officially prohibited in public and private life until 1991. Many who spoke, published, or sang in Kurdish were arrested and imprisoned.

The PKK was formed in an effort to establish linguistic, cultural, and political rights for Turkey's Kurdish minority. However, the full-scale insurgency did not begin until 15 August 1984, when the PKK announced a Kurdish uprising. Between 1984 and 2012, an estimated 40,000 had died, the majority of whom were Turkish Kurdish civilians. Both sides were accused of numerous human rights abuses. The European Court of Human Rights has condemned Turkey for thousands of human rights abuses. Many judgments are related to the systematic executions of Kurdish civilians, torture, forced displacements, destroyed villages, arbitrary arrests, and the forced disappearance or murder of Kurdish journalists, activists and politicians. Teachers who provided and students who demanded education in Kurdish language were prosecuted and sentenced for supporting terrorism of the PKK. Similarly, the PKK had faced international condemnation, mainly by Turkish allies, for using terrorist tactics, which include civilian massacres, summary executions, suicide bombers, and child soldiers, and involvement in drug trafficking.

In February 1999, PKK leader Abdullah Öcalan was arrested in Nairobi, Kenya by a group of special forces personnel and taken to Turkey, where he remains in prison on an island in the Sea of Marmara. The first insurgency lasted until March 1993, when the PKK declared a unilateral ceasefire. Fighting resumed the same year. In 2013, the Turkish government started talks with Öcalan. Following mainly secret negotiations, a largely successful ceasefire was put in place by both the Turkish state and the PKK. On 21 March 2013, Öcalan announced the "end of armed struggle" and a ceasefire with peace talks.

The rise of Islamic State on Turkey's southern border illuminated diverging interests and ignited new tensions. In response to Islamic State's 2015 Suruç bombing on Turkish soil, the Ceylanpınar incidents saw the killing of two Turkish police officers by suspected PKK militants and the return to open conflict. Subsequently, the conflict resulted in about 8,000 killed in Turkey alone, with about 20,000 more in Syria and Iraq due to Turkish military operations. Numerous human rights violations occurred, including torture and widespread destruction of property. Substantial parts of many Kurdish-majority cities including Diyarbakır, Şırnak, Mardin, Cizre, Nusaybin, and Yüksekova were destroyed in the clashes or external operations.

New peace process discussions began in 2024. In early 2025, Öcalan called PKK to disarm. On 12 May 2025, the PKK announced its full dissolution to favor political means. However, Turkey's military will continue operations against the Kurdistan Workers’ Party (PKK) in regions where it remains active, despite the group's announcement of its dissolution.

== History ==
=== Beginnings ===
In 1977, a small group under Öcalan's leadership released a declaration on Kurdish identity in Turkey. The group, which called itself the Revolutionaries of Kurdistan also included Ali Haydar Kaytan, Cemil Bayik, Haki Karer and Kemal Pir. The group decided in 1974 to start a campaign for Kurdish rights. Cemil Bayik was sent to Urfa, Kemal Pir to Mus, Haki Karer to Batman, and Ali Haydar Kaytan to Tunceli. They then started student organisations that contacted local workers and farmers to raise awareness about Kurdish rights.

In 1977, an assembly was held to evaluate these political activities. The assembly included 100 people from different backgrounds and several representatives of other leftist organisations. In spring 1977, Öcalan travelled to Mount Ararat, Erzurum, Tunceli, Elazig, Antep, and other cities to make the public aware of the group's activities. This was followed by a Turkish government crackdown against the organisation. On 18 May 1977, Haki Karer was assassinated in Antep. During this period, the group was also targeted by the Turkish ultranationalist organization, the Nationalist Movement Party's Grey Wolves. Some wealthy Kurdish landowners targeted the group as well, killing Halil Çavgun on 18 May 1978, which resulted in large protest meetings in Erzurum, Dersim, Elazig, and Antep.

The founding Congress of the PKK was held on 27 November 1978 in Fis, a village near the city of Lice. During this congress, the 25 people present decided to found the Kurdistan Workers' Party. The Turkish state, Turkish rightist groups, and some Kurdish landowners continued their attacks on the group. In response, the PKK organised and armed members to protect itself, thus becoming more involved in the fighting between leftist and rightist groups in Turkey (1978–1980). During this time, the right-wing Grey Wolves militia killed 109 and injured 176 Alevi Kurds in the town of Kahramanmaraş on 25 December 1978 in what would become known as the Maraş Massacre. In Summer 1979, Öcalan travelled to Syria and Lebanon where he made contacts with Syrian and Palestinian leaders. After the Turkish coup d'état on 12 September 1980 and a crackdown which was launched on all political organisations, during which at least 191 people were killed and half a million were imprisoned, (Note: According to official figures, in the period during and after the coup, military agencies collected files on over 2 million people, 650,000 of which were detained, 230,000 of which were put on trial under martial law. Prosecutors demanded the death penalty against over 7 thousand of them, of which 517 were sentenced to death and fifty were actually hanged. Some 400,000 people were denied passports and 30,000 lost their jobs after the new regime classified them as dangerous. 14,000 people were stripped of their Turkish citizenship and 30,000 fled the country as asylum seekers after the coup. Aside from the fifty people that were hanged, some 366 people died under suspicious circumstances (classified as accidents at the time), 171 were tortured to death in prison, 43 were claimed to have committed suicide in prison and 16 were shot for attempting to escape.) most of the PKK withdrew into Syria and Lebanon. Öcalan went to Syria in September 1980 with Kemal Pir, Mahsum Korkmaz, and Delil Dogan being sent to set up an organisation in Lebanon. Some PKK fighters took part in the 1982 Lebanon War on the Syrian side.

The Second PKK Party Congress was then held in Daraa, Syria, from 20 to 25 August 1982. Here it was decided that the organisation would return to Turkish Kurdistan to start an armed guerilla war there for the creation of an independent Kurdish state. Meanwhile, they prepared guerrilla forces in Syria and Lebanon to go to war. However, many PKK leaders were arrested in Turkey and sent to Diyarbakır Prison. Because of the treatment of the prisoners, the prison became the site of much political protest. (See also Torture in Turkey#Deaths in custody.)

In Diyarbakır Prison, PKK member Mazlum Doğan burned himself to death on 21 March 1982, in protest at the treatment in prison. Ferhat Kurtay, Necmi Önen, Mahmut Zengin and Eşref Anyık followed his example on 17 May. On 14 July, PKK members Kemal Pir, M. Hayri Durmuş, Ali Çiçek and Akif Yılmaz started a hunger strike in Diyarbakır Prison. In 1983, the conflict reached Iraqi Kurdistan as the Kurdistan Region–PKK conflict. Kemal Pir died on 7 September, M. Hayri Durmuş on the 12th, Akif Yılmaz on the 15th, and Ali Çiçek on the 17th. On 13 April 1984, a 75-day hunger strike started in Istanbul. As a result, four prisoners—Abdullah Meral, Haydar Başbağ, Fatih Ökütülmüş, and Hasan Telci—died.

On 25 October 1986, the third Congress was held in Beqaa Valley, Lebanon. Issues raised included lack of discipline, growing internal criticism, and splinter groups within the organization. This had led the organisation to execute some internal critics, especially ex-members who had joined Tekosin, a rival Marxist–Leninist organization. Öcalan strongly criticized the leaders responsible for the guerrilla forces during the early 1980s and threatened others with the death penalty, if they joined rival groups or refused to obey orders. The PKK's military defeats meant they were no closer to their primary goal of an independent Kurdistan. Cooperation with criminals and dictators had tarnished the organization's image. During the Congress, the leaders decided to advance the armed struggle, increase the number of fighters, and dissolve the HRK, which was replaced by the Kurdistan Popular Liberation Army (ARGK). A newly established Mahsum Korkmaz Academy, a politico-military academy, replaced the Helve Camp, and a new military conscription policy was approved, which obliged every family to send someone to the guerrilla forces.

The decisions that were taken during the third Congress transformed the PKK from a Leninist organization into one in which power was more concentrated, as Öcalan accrued more Önderlik (leadership). Some of the reasons why Öcalan took power from the other leaders, such as Murat Karayilan, Cemil Bayik and Duran Kalkan, were growing internal conflict and the organization's inability to stop it. According to Michael Gunter, Öcalan, even before this time, had already carried out a purge of many rival PKK members, who were tortured and forced to confess they were traitors before being executed. Ibrahim Halik, Mehmet Ali Cetiner, Mehmet Result Altinok, Saime Askin, and Ayten Yildirim were some of the victims. Later in 2006, Öcalan denied these accusations and stated in his book that both Mahsum Korkmaz, the first supreme military commander of the PKK, and Engin Sincer, a high-ranking commander, likely died as a result of internal conflicts and described the perpetrators as "gangs". Leaked reports, however, revealed the authoritarian personality of Öcalan, who had brutally suppressed dissent and purged opponents since the early 1980s. According to David L. Philips, up to sixty PKK members were executed in 1986, including Mahsum Korkmaz, who he believes was murdered on 28 March 1986. Between the 1980 and 1990, the organization targeted defectors, assassinating two of them in Sweden, two in the Netherlands, three in Germany and one in Denmark.

In 1990, during the fourth Congress, the PKK ended its unpopular conscription policy. The organization's attempts to take into the account the demands and criticism of its support base had helped it to increase its popularity. According to Stanton, the PKK's improved relationship with its civilian base likely created incentives for the government to engage in state terrorism against some of its Kurdish citizens. The PKK was rarely able to prevent this.

=== First insurgency ===
==== 1984–1993 ====
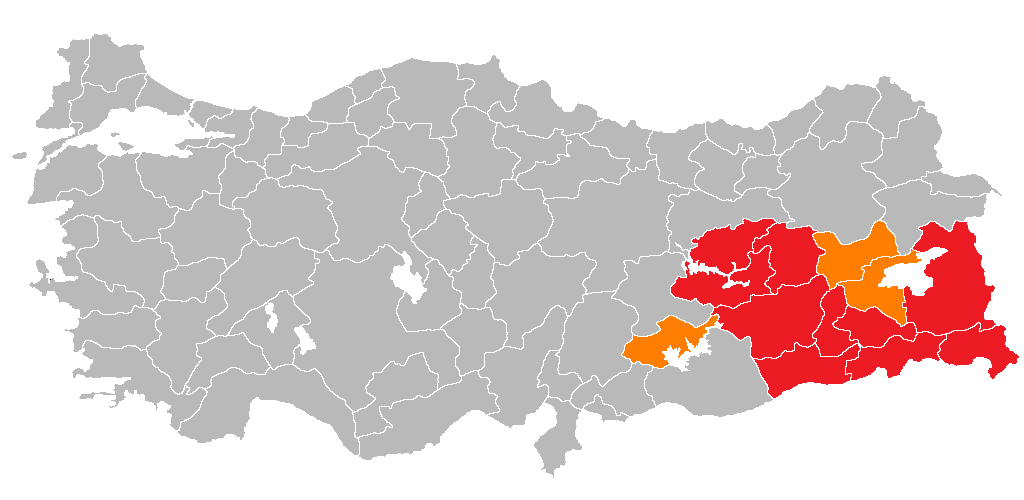
OHAL region—defining areas in Turkey under a state of emergency—in red with neighbouring provinces in orange, 1987–2002

The PKK launched its insurgency against the Turkish state on 15 August 1984 with armed attacks on Eruh and Semdinli. During these attacks, one Turkish Gendarmerie soldier was killed and seven soldiers, two policemen and three civilians injured. It was followed by a PKK raid on a police station in Siirt, two days later.

In the early 1990s, President Turgut Özal agreed to negotiations with the PKK, after the 1991 Gulf War changed the geopolitical dynamics in the region. Apart from Özal, himself half-Kurdish, few Turkish politicians were interested in a peace process, nor was more than a part of the PKK itself. In February 1991, during the presidency of Özal, the prohibition of Kurdish music was ended.

In 1993, Özal returned to working on a peace plan with the former finance minister Adnan Kahveci and the General Commander of the Turkish Gendarmerie, Eşref Bitlis.

=== Unilateral cease-fire (1993) ===
Negotiations led to a unilateral cease-fire by the PKK on 17 March 1993. Accompanied by Jalal Talabani at a press conference in Barelias, Lebanon, Öcalan stated that the PKK no longer sought a separate state, but peace, dialogue, and free political action for Kurds in Turkey within the framework of a democratic state. Süleyman Demirel, the prime minister of Turkey at the time, refused to negotiate with the PKK, but also stated that forced Turkification was the wrong approach towards the Kurds. Several Kurdish politicians supported the ceasefire, and Kemal Burkay and Ahmet Türk of the People's Labor Party (HEP) were also present at the press conference.

With the PKK's ceasefire declaration in hand, Özal was planning to propose a major pro-Kurdish reform package at the next meeting of the National Security Council. The president's death on 17 April led to the postponement of that meeting, and the plans were never presented. A Turkish army attack on the PKK on 19 May 1993 in Kulp brought the ceasefire to an end. Five days later, the PKK carried out the Çewlik massacre. Former PKK commander turned whistleblower Şemdin Sakık has said that the massacre had been allowed to go ahead by the Turkish military, and was part of the Doğu Çalışma Grubu's coup plans. On 8 June 1993, Öcalan announced the end of the PKK ceasefire.

=== Insurgency (1993–1995) ===
Under the new Presidency of Süleyman Demirel and Premiership of Tansu Çiller, the Castle Plan (to use any and all violent means to solve the Kurdish question), which Özal had opposed, was enacted, and the peace process abandoned. Some journalists and politicians maintain that Özal's death (allegedly by poison), along with the assassination of a number of political and military figures supporting his peace efforts, was part of a covert military coup in 1993 aimed at stopping the peace plans.

To counter the PKK, the Turkish military started new counter-insurgency strategies between 1992 and 1995. To deprive the rebels of a logistical base of operations and punish local people supporting the PKK, the military carried out deforestation of the countryside and destroyed over 3,000 Kurdish villages, causing at least 2 million refugees. Most of these villages were evacuated, but other villages were burned, bombed, or shelled by government forces, and several villages were obliterated from the air. While some were destroyed or evacuated, other villages agreed to join the side of the government. The state offered salaries to local farmers and shepherds to join the Village Guards, to prevent the PKK from operating in these villages. Villages which refused to cooperate were evacuated by the military. These tactics managed to drive the rebels from the cities and villages into the mountains, although they still often launched reprisals on pro-government villages, which included attacks on civilians. Turkish armed forces reported that on 26 May 1994, the Turkish Air Force targeted the Kurdistan Workers' Party (PKK) militants by bombing North Iraq, and killing 79 militants. During Newroz (the Kurdish New Year) on 20 March 1995, the Turkish military launched another cross-border operation against the PKK in Iraq to prevent further border station ambushes conducted by the PKK. A force of 35,000 personnel (in which most were there for pulling security, a very small portion took part in the actual fighting) went into Iraqi Kurdistan, assisted by planes, helicopters, tanks and APCs. The operation ended in a Turkish victory as the Zap Camp was captured and destroyed by Turkish forces. 555 PKK members were killed and another were 13 captured.

=== Unilateral ceasefire (1995–1996) ===
In December 1995, the PKK announced a second unilateral ceasefire, ahead of the general elections on 24 December 1995. This was aimed at giving the new Turkish government time to articulate a way of resolving the conflict. During the ceasefire, civil society groups organized several peace initiatives in support of a solution to the conflict. But in May 1996, there was an attempt to assassinate Abdullah Öcalan in Damascus, and in June of the same year the Turkish military began to pursue the PKK into Iraqi Kurdistan. The PKK announced the end of the unilateral ceasefire on 16 August 1996, stating that it was still ready for peace negotiations as a political solution.

=== Insurgency (1996–1999) ===
One of the turning points in the conflict was when Turkey did the largest cross-border mission in its history. Operation Hammer was done in May 1997 and over fifty thousand Turkish soldiers and ten thousand village guards took part in the operation. The operation was successful as the Turkish military killed over 3,000 insurgents and captured more than 400 in just two months and destroyed almost all of the Kurdish camps in Northern Iraq with just 114 casualties. Another turning point in the conflict came in 1998, when, after political pressure and military threats from the Turkish government against Syria, the PKK's leader, Abdullah Öcalan, was forced to leave Syria, where he had been in exile since September 1980. He first went to Russia, then to Italy and Greece. He was eventually brought to the Greek embassy in Nairobi, Kenya. After leaving the embassy on 15 February 1999 for the airport, he was kidnapped in a joint MİT-CIA operation and brought to Turkey, which resulted in major protests by Kurds worldwide. Three Kurdish protestors were shot dead when trying to enter the Israeli consulate in Berlin to protest alleged Israeli involvement in his capture. Although the capture of Öcalan ended a third cease-fire which Öcalan had declared on 1 August 1998, on 1 September 1999 the PKK declared a unilateral cease-fire which would last until 2004.

=== Unilateral cease-fire (1999–2003) ===
KADEK flag

KONGRA-GEL flag

After the unilateral cease-fire the PKK declared in September 1999, their forces fully withdrew from Turkish Kurdistan, set up new bases in the kandil Mountains of Iraqi Kurdistan, and in February 2000 they declared the formal end of the war. After this, the PKK said it would switch its strategy to using peaceful methods to achieve their objectives. In April 2002, the PKK changed its name to KADEK (Kurdistan Freedom and Democracy Congress), claiming the PKK had fulfilled its mission and would now move on as purely political organisation. In October 2003 the KADEK announced its dissolution and declared the creation of a new organisation: KONGRA-GEL (Kurdistan Peoples Congress).

Offers by the PKK for negotiations were ignored by the Turkish government, which claimed that the KONGRA-GEL continued to carry out armed attacks in the 1999–2004 period, although not on the same scale as before September 1999. They also blame the KONGRA-GEL for Kurdish riots which happened during the period. The PKK argues that all of its military activity during this period was defensive, as the Turkish military launched some 700 raids against their bases, including in Northern Iraq. Despite the KONGRA-GEL cease-fire, other groups continued their armed activities. For example, the Revolutionary Party of Kurdistan (PŞK) tried to use the cease-fire to attract PKK fighters to join their organisation. The Kurdistan Freedom Hawks (TAK) were formed during this period by radical KONGRA-GEL commanders dissatisfied with the cease-fire. The period after the capture of Öcalan was used by the Turkish government to launch major crackdown operations against the Turkish Hezbollah (Kurdish Hezbollah), arresting 3,300 Hizbullah members in 2000, compared to 130 in 1998, and killing the group's leader Hüseyin Velioğlu on 13 January 2000. During this phase of the war at least 145 people were killed during fighting between the PKK and security forces.

After the AK Party came to power in 2002, the Turkish state started to ease restrictions on the Kurdish language and culture.

From 2003 to 2004 there was a power struggle inside the KONGRA-GEL between a reformist wing which wanted the organisation to disarm completely and a traditionalist wing which wanted the organisation to resume its armed insurgency once again. The conservative wing of the organisation won this power struggle forcing reformist leaders such as Kani Yilmaz, Nizamettin Tas and Abdullah Öcalan's younger brother Osman Öcalan to leave the organisation. The three major traditionalist leaders, Murat Karayilan, Cemil Bayik and Bahoz Erdal formed the new leadership committee of the organisation. The new administration decided to restart the insurgency, because they claimed that without guerillas the PKK's political activities would remain unsuccessful. This came as the pro-Kurdish People's Democracy Party (HADEP) was banned by the Turkish Supreme Court on 13 March 2003 and its leader Murat Bozlak was imprisoned.

In April 2005, KONGRA-GEL changed its name back to PKK. Because not all of the KONGRA-GEL's elements accepted this, the organisation has also been referred to as the New PKK. The KONGRA-GEL has since become the Legislative Assembly of the Kurdistan Communities Union, a pan-Kurdish umbrella organisation which includes the PKK. Ex-DEP member Zübeyir Aydar is the president of the KONGRA-GEL.

Through the cease-fire years 2000–2003, some 711 people were killed, according to the Turkish government. The Uppsala Conflict Data Program put casualties during these years at 368 to 467 killed.

=== Insurgency (2004–2012) ===
==== 2003–2005 ====
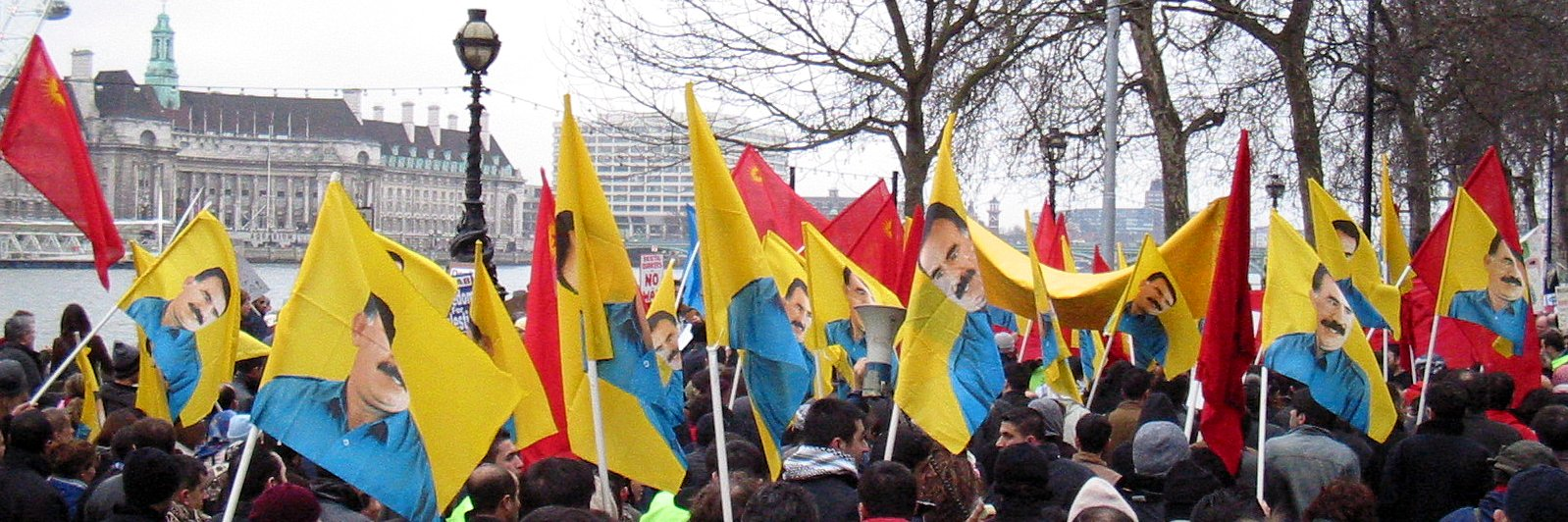
PKK supporters in London, April 2003

In September 2003, the PKK declared an end to its cease-fire, but waited until mid-2004 before going on the offensive again. In June 2004, the PKK resumed its armed activities because they claimed the Turkish government was ignoring their calls for negotiations and was still attacking their forces. The government claimed that in that same month, some 2,000 Kurdish guerrillas entered Turkey via Iraqi Kurdistan. The PKK, now lacking Syrian government support and the manpower they had in the 1990s, took up new tactics. It reduced the size of its field units from 15 to 20 fighters to teams of 6–8, and avoided direct confrontations, relying more on the use of landmines, snipers and small ambushes, using hit and run tactics. Another change in PKK tactics was that the organisation no longer attempted to control any territory, not even after dark. Violence increased throughout 2004 and 2005 during which the PKK was blamed for dozens of bombings in Western Turkey throughout 2005, including the 2005 Kuşadası minibus bombing (which killed five), although the PKK denied responsibility.

==== 2006 ====
In March 2006 heavy fighting broke out around Diyarbakir between the PKK and Turkish security forces, as well as large riots because of "local anger over high unemployment, poverty and Ankara's reluctance to grant more autonomy to the mainly Kurdish region". The army closed the roads to Diyarbakır Airport and shut down many schools and businesses. In August, the Kurdistan Freedom Hawks (TAK), which vowed to "turn Turkey into hell", launched a major bombing campaign. On 25 August two coordinated low-level blasts targeted a bank in Adana, on 27 August a school in Istanbul was targeted by a bombing, on 28 August there were three coordinated attacks in Marmaris and one in Antalya targeting the tourist industry and on 30 August there was a TAK bombing in Mersin. These bombings were condemned by the PKK, which declared its fifth cease-fire on 1 October 2006, which lessened the intensity of the conflict. Minor clashes continued due to Turkish military operations. In total, the conflict claimed over 500 lives in 2006. 2006 also saw the PKK assassinate one of their former commanders, Kani Yilmaz, in February, in Iraq.

==== 2007 ====
In May 2007, there was a bombing in Ankara that killed 6 and injured 121 people. The Turkish government alleged the PKK was responsible for the bombing. On 4 June, a PKK suicide bombing in Tunceli killed seven soldiers and wounded six at a military base. Tensions across the Iraqi border also started playing up as Turkish forces entered Iraq several times in pursuit of PKK fighting and In June, as 4 soldiers were killed by landmines, large areas of Iraqi Kurdistan were shelled which damaged 9 villages and forced residents to flee. On 7 October 2007, 40–50 PKK fighters ambushed an 18-man Turkish commando unit in the Gabar mountains, killing 15 commandos and injuring three, which made it the deadliest PKK attack since the 1990s. In response a law was passed allowing the Turkish military to take action inside Iraqi territory. Then on 21 October 2007, 150–200 militants attacked an outpost, in Dağlıca, Yüksekova, manned by a 50-man infantry unit. The outpost was almost overrun and the PKK killed 12, wounded 17 and captured 6 Turkish soldiers which were released later. They then withdrew into Iraqi Kurdistan. The Turkish military killed 32 PKK fighters in hot pursuit operations, after the attack, however this was denied by the PKK. The Turkish military responded by bombing PKK bases on 24 October, which resulted in many camps and caves being destroyed, along with 200 PKK insurgents dying in the process. and started preparing for a major cross-border military operation.

==== 2008 ====
This major cross-border offensive, dubbed Operation Sun, started on 21 February 2008 and was preceded by an aerial offensive against PKK camps in northern Iraq, which began on 16 December 2007. Between 3,000 and 10,000 Turkish forces took part in the offensive. Around 230 PKK fighters were killed in the ground offensive, while 27 Turkish forces were killed. According to the PKK however, this was completely false and that over 125 Turkish forces were killed, while PKK casualties were in the tens. Smaller scale Turkish operations against PKK bases in Iraqi Kurdistan continued afterwards. On 27 July 2008, Turkey blamed the PKK for an Istanbul double-bombing which killed 17 and injured 154 people. The PKK denied any involvement. On 4 October, the most violent clashes since the October 2007 clashes in Hakkari erupted as the PKK attacked the 2008 Aktütün attack post in Şemdinli in the Hakkâri Province, at night. 17 Turkish soldiers were killed and 20 were injured, meanwhile 123 PKK fighters were killed during the fighting. On 10 November, the Iranian Kurdish insurgent group PJAK declared it would be halting operations inside Iran to start fighting the Turkish military.

==== 2009 ====
At the start of 2009 Turkey opened its first Kurdish-language TV-channel, TRT 6, and on 19 March 2009 local elections were held in Turkey in which the pro-Kurdish Democratic Society Party (DTP) won a majority of the vote in the South East. Soon after, on 13 April 2009, the PKK declared its sixth ceasefire, after Abdullah Öcalan called on them to end military operations and prepare for peace. The following day the Turkish authorities arrested 53 Kurdish politicians of the Democratic Society Party (DTP). In September Turkey's Erdoğan-government launched the Kurdish initiative, which included plans to rename Kurdish villages that had been given Turkish names, expand the scope of the freedom of expression, restore Turkish citizenship to Kurdish refugees, strengthen local governments, and extend a partial amnesty for PKK fighters. But the plans for the Kurdish initiative where heavily hurt after the DTP was banned by the Turkish constitutional court on 11 December 2009 and its leaders were subsequently put on trial for terrorism. A total of 1,400 DTP members were arrested and 900 detained in the government crackdown against the party. This caused major riots by Kurds all over Turkey and resulted in violent clashes between pro-Kurdish and security forces as well as pro-Turkish demonstrators, which resulted in several injuries and fatalities. On 7 December the PKK launched an ambush in Reşadiye which killed seven and injured three Turkish soldiers, which became the deadliest PKK attack in that region since the 1990s.

==== 2010 ====
On 1 May 2010 the PKK declared an end to its cease-fire, launching an attack in Tunceli that killed four and injured seven soldiers. On 31 May, Abdullah Öcalan declared an end to his attempts at re-approachment and establishing dialogue with the Turkish government, leaving PKK top commanders in charge of the conflict. The PKK then stepped up its armed activities, starting with a missile attack on a navy base in İskenderun, killing 7 and wounding 6 soldiers. On 18 and 19 June, heavy fighting broke out that resulted in the death of 12 PKK fighters, 12 Turkish soldiers and injury of 17 Turkish soldiers, as the PKK launched three separate attacks in Hakkari and Elazig provinces.

Another major attack in Hakkari occurred on 20 July 2010, killing six and wounding seventeen Turkish soldiers, with one PKK fighter being killed. The next day, Murat Karayilan, the leader of the PKK, announced that the PKK would lay down its arms if the Kurdish issue would be resolved through dialogue and threatened to declare independence if this demand was not met. Turkish forces had killed 187 and captured 160 PKK members by 14 July, and killed another 227 by the end of the year. By 27 July, Turkish news sources reported the deaths of 72 security forces, which exceeded the 2009 toll. On 12 August, however, a ramadan cease-fire was declared by the PKK. In November the cease-fire was extended until the Turkish general election on 12 June 2011, despite alleging that Turkey had launched over 80 military operations against them during this period. Despite the truce, the PKK responded to these military operations by launching retaliatory attacks in Siirt and Hakkari provinces, killing 12 Turkish soldiers.

==== 2011 ====
A demonstration against the PKK in Frankfurt, October 2011

The cease-fire was revoked early, on 28 February 2011. Soon afterwards three PKK fighters were killed while trying to get into Turkey through northern Iraq. In May, counter-insurgency operations left 12 PKK fighters and 5 soldiers dead. This then resulted in major Kurdish protests across Turkey as part of a civil disobedience campaign launched by the pro-Kurdish Peace and Democracy Party (BDP), during these protests 2 people were killed, 308 injured and 2,506 arrested by Turkish authorities. The 12 June elections saw a historical performance for the pro-Kurdish Peace and Democracy Party (BDP) which won 36 seats in the South-East, which was more than the ruling Justice and Development Party (AKP), which won only 30 seats in Kurdish areas. However, six of the 36 elected BDP deputies remain in Turkish jails as of June 2011. One of the six jailed deputies, Hatip Dicle, was then stripped of his elected position by the constitutional court, after which the 30 free MPs declared a boycott of Turkish parliament. The PKK intensified its campaign again, in July killing 20 Turkish soldiers in two weeks, during which at least 10 PKK fighters were killed, the most of these occurring in a single ambush. On 17 August 2011, the Turkish Armed Forces launched multiple raids against Kurdish rebels, striking 132 targets. Turkish military bombed PKK targets in northern Iraq in six days of air raids, according to General Staff, where 90–100 PKK Soldiers were killed, and at least 80 injured. From July to September Iran carried out an offensive against the PJAK in Northern Iraq, which resulted in a cease-fire on 29 September. After the cease-fire the PJAK withdrew its forces from Iran and joined with the PKK to fight Turkey. Turkish counter-terrorism operations reported a sharp increase of Iranian citizens among the insurgents killed in October and November, such as the six PJAK fighters killed in Çukurca on 28 October. On 19 October, twenty-six Turkish soldiers were killed and 18 injured in 8 simultaneous PKK attacks in Cukurca and Yuksekova, in Hakkari provieen 10,000 and 15,000 full-time, which is the highest it has ever been.

==== 2012 ====
In summer 2012, the conflict with the PKK took a violent curve, in parallel with the Syrian civil war as President Bashar al-Assad ceded control of several Kurdish cities in Syria to the PYD, the Syrian affiliate of the PKK, and Turkey armed ISIS and other Islamic groups against Kurds. Turkish foreign minister Ahmet Davutoglu accused the Assad government of arming the group. In June and August there were heavy clashes in Hakkari province, described as the most violent in years. as the PKK attempted to seize control of Şemdinli and engage the Turkish army in a "frontal battle" by blocking the roads leading to the town from Iran and Iraq and setting up DShK heavy machine guns and rocket launchers on high ground to ambush Turkish motorized units that would be sent to re-take the town. However the Turkish army avoided the trap by destroying the heavy weapons from the air and using long range artillery to root out the PKK. The Turkish military declared operation was ended successfully on 11 August, claiming to have killed 115 guerrillas and lost only six soldiers and two village guards. On 20 August, eight people were killed and 66 wounded by a deadly bombing in Gaziantep. According to the KCK 400 incidents of shelling, air bombardment and armed clashes occurred in August.

=== Peace process 2012–2015 ===
On 28 December 2012, in a television interview upon a question of whether the government had a project to solve the issue, Erdoğan said that the government was conducting negotiations with jailed rebel leader Öcalan. Negotiations were initially named as Solution Process (Çözüm Süreci) in public. While negotiations were going on, there were numerous events that were regarded as sabotage to derail the talks: The assassination of the PKK administrators Sakine Cansız, Fidan Doğan and Leyla Söylemez in Paris, revealing Öcalan's talks with the pro-Kurdish party Peoples' Democratic Party (HDP) to the public via the Milliyet newspaper and finally, the bombings of the Justice Ministry of Turkey and Erdoğan's office at the Ak Party headquarters in Ankara. However, both parties vehemently condemned all three events as they occurred and stated that they were determined anyway. Finally on 21 March 2013, after months of negotiations with the Turkish Government, Abdullah Ocalan's letter to people was read both in Turkish and Kurdish during Nowruz celebrations in Diyarbakır. The letter called a cease-fire that included disarmament and withdrawal from Turkish soil and calling an end to armed struggle. PKK announced that they would obey, stating that the year of 2013 is the year of solution either through war or through peace. Erdoğan welcomed the letter stating that concrete steps will follow PKK's withdrawal.

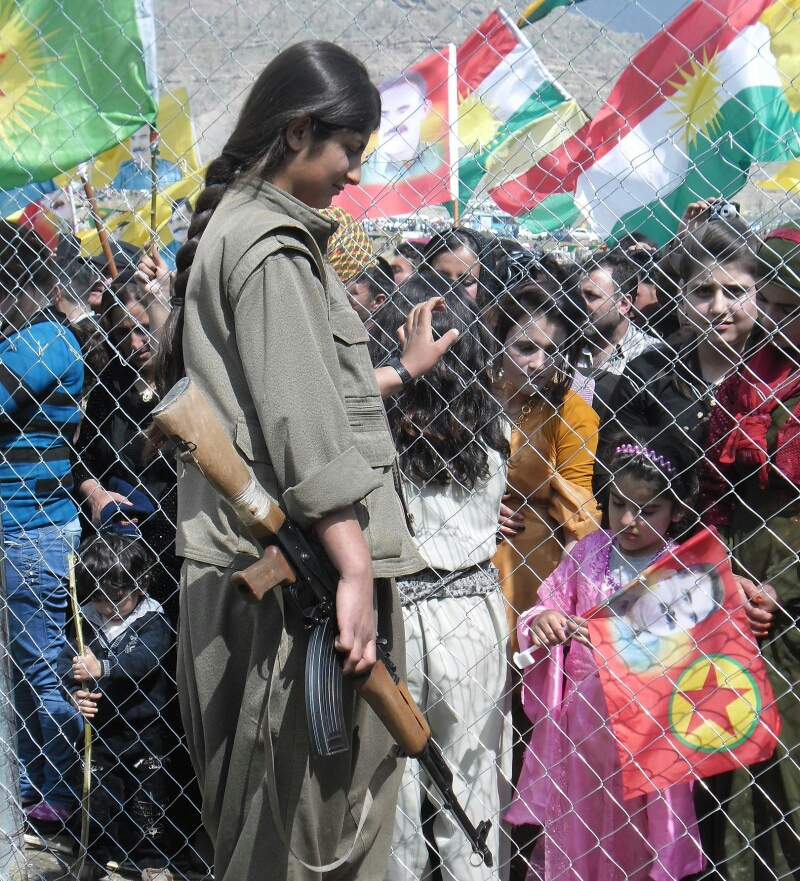
Kurdish PKK guerilla at the Newroz celebration in kandil, 23 March 2014

On 25 April 2013, PKK announced that it would be withdrawing all its forces within Turkey to northern Iraq. According to the Turkish government and the Kurds and most of the press, this move marks the end of 30-year-old conflict. Second phase which includes constitutional and legal changes towards the recognition of human rights of the Kurds starts simultaneously with withdrawal.

==== Escalation ====
On 6 and 7 October 2014, riots erupted in various cities in Turkey for protesting the Siege of Kobane. The Kurds accused the Turkish government of supporting ISIS and not letting people send support for Kobane Kurds. Protesters were met with tear gas and water cannons. 37 people were killed in protests. During these protests, there were deadly clashes between PKK and Hizbullah sympathizers. 3 soldiers were killed by PKK in January 2015, as a sign of rising tensions in the country.

=== 2015 to February 2025 ===
In June 2015, the main Syrian Kurdish militia, YPG, and the Turkey's main pro-Kurdish party, HDP, accused Turkey of allowing Islamic State (ISIL) soldiers to cross its border and attack the Kurdish city of Kobanî in Syria. The conflict between Turkey and PKK escalated following the 20 July 2015 Suruç bombing attack on progressive activists, which was claimed by ISIL. During the 24–25 July 2015 Operation Martyr Yalçın, Turkey bombed alleged PKK bases in Iraq and PYD bases in Syria's Kurdish region Rojava, purportedly retaliating the killing of two policeman in the town of Ceylanpınar (which the PKK denied carrying out) and effectively ending the cease-fire (after many months of increasing tensions). Turkish warplanes also bombed YPG bases in Syria.

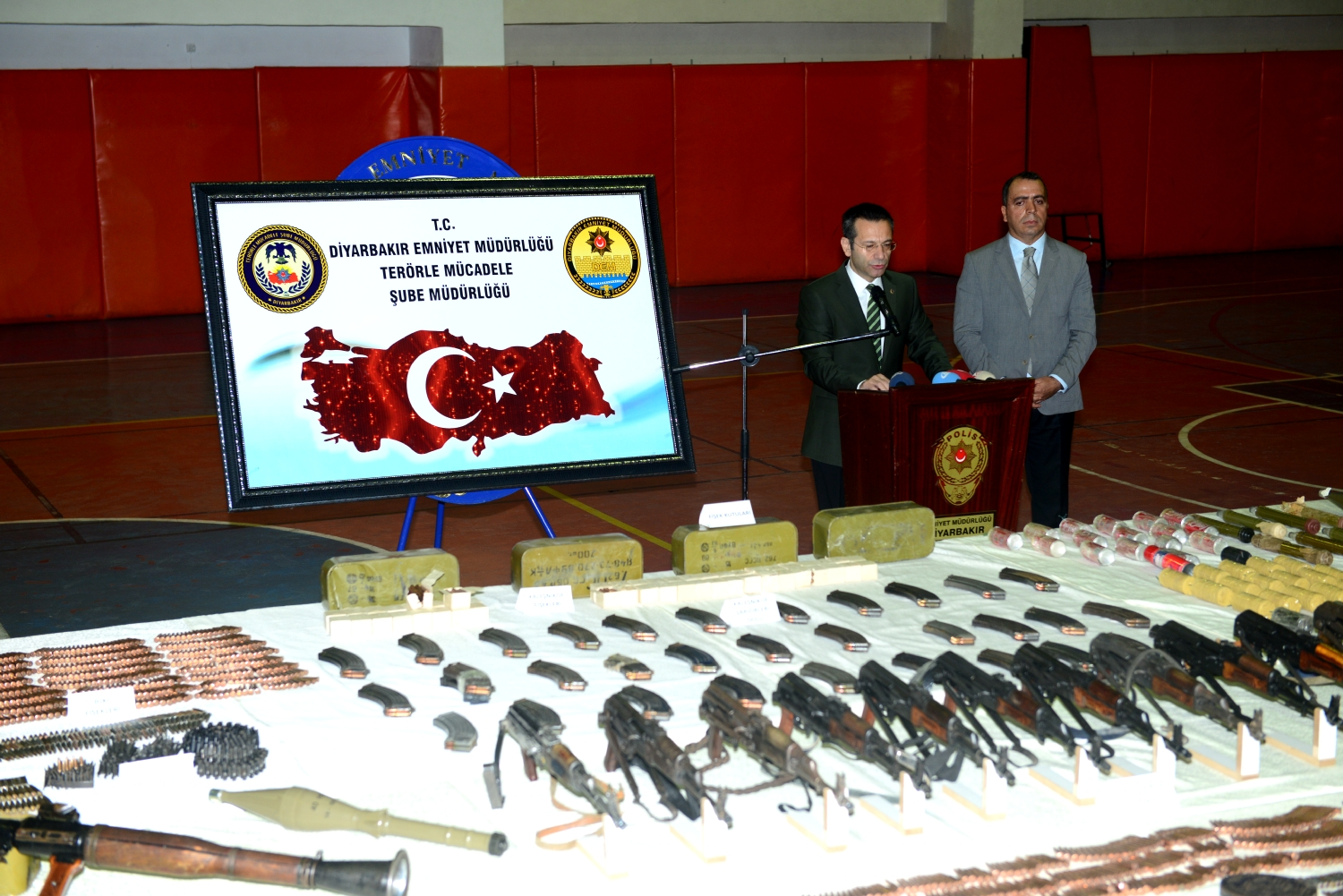
Turkish police announcing seizure of PKK ammunition in Diyarbakır, August 2015

Violence soon spread throughout Turkey. Many Kurdish businesses were destroyed by mobs. The headquarters and branches of the pro-Kurdish Peoples' Democratic Party (HDP) were also attacked. There are reports of civilians being killed in several Kurdish-populated towns and villages. The Council of Europe raised their concerns over the attacks on civilians and the 4 September 2015 blockade of Cizre.

But also the Kurdish rebel fighters did not sit still: a Turkish Governor claimed that Kurdish assailants had fired on a police vehicle in Adana in September 2015, killing two officers, and some unspecified "clash" with PKK rebels purportedly took place in Hakkâri Province. President Erdogan claimed that between 23 July and late September, 150 Turkish officers and 2,000 Kurdish rebels had been killed. In December 2015, Turkish military operations in the Kurdish regions of southeastern Turkey had killed hundreds of civilians, displaced hundreds of thousands and caused massive destruction in residential areas. According to the Human Rights Watch (HRW) report, "Local human rights groups have recorded well over 100 civilian deaths and multiple injuries."

The spring of 2016 saw the seasonal uptick in combat activity. In May, a Turkish Bell AH-1 SuperCobra helicopter was documented shot down by a PKK-fired Russian made MANPADS.

On 6 May 2016, HBDH, an umbrella organization built around the Kurdish PKK, attacked a Gendarmerie General Command base in Giresun Province in northeastern Turkey. According to news reports, a roadside bomb exploded, targeting a Gendarmerie vehicle. HDBH claimed responsibility for the attack on 8 May, stating that three gendarmes died in the attack, as well as the Base Commander, who was the intended target. the Joint Command of the HBDH has claimed responsibility for several more attacks in the region, primarily targeting Turkish soldiers or gendarmes. The tactics employed by the alliance are very similar to those used by the PKK. The most notable attack came on 19 July 2016, just 4 days after the 2016 Turkish coup d'état attempt. HBDH reported that they had killed 11 Turkish riot police in Trabzon Province at 08:30 that morning. The HBDH report is consistent in time and location to an attack reported by Doğan News Agency, in which "unknown assailants" fired on a police checkpoint. This report states that 3 officers were killed and 5 were injured, along with a civilian.

In January 2018, the Turkish military and its Free Syrian Army and Sham Legion allies began a cross-border operation in the Kurdish-majority Afrin Canton in Northern Syria, against the Kurdish-led Democratic Union Party in Syria (PYD) and the U.S.-supported YPG Kurdish militia. In March 2018, Turkey launched military operations to eliminate the Kurdish PKK fighters in northern Iraq. This failed however, as the PKK has expanded its operations in Iraq.

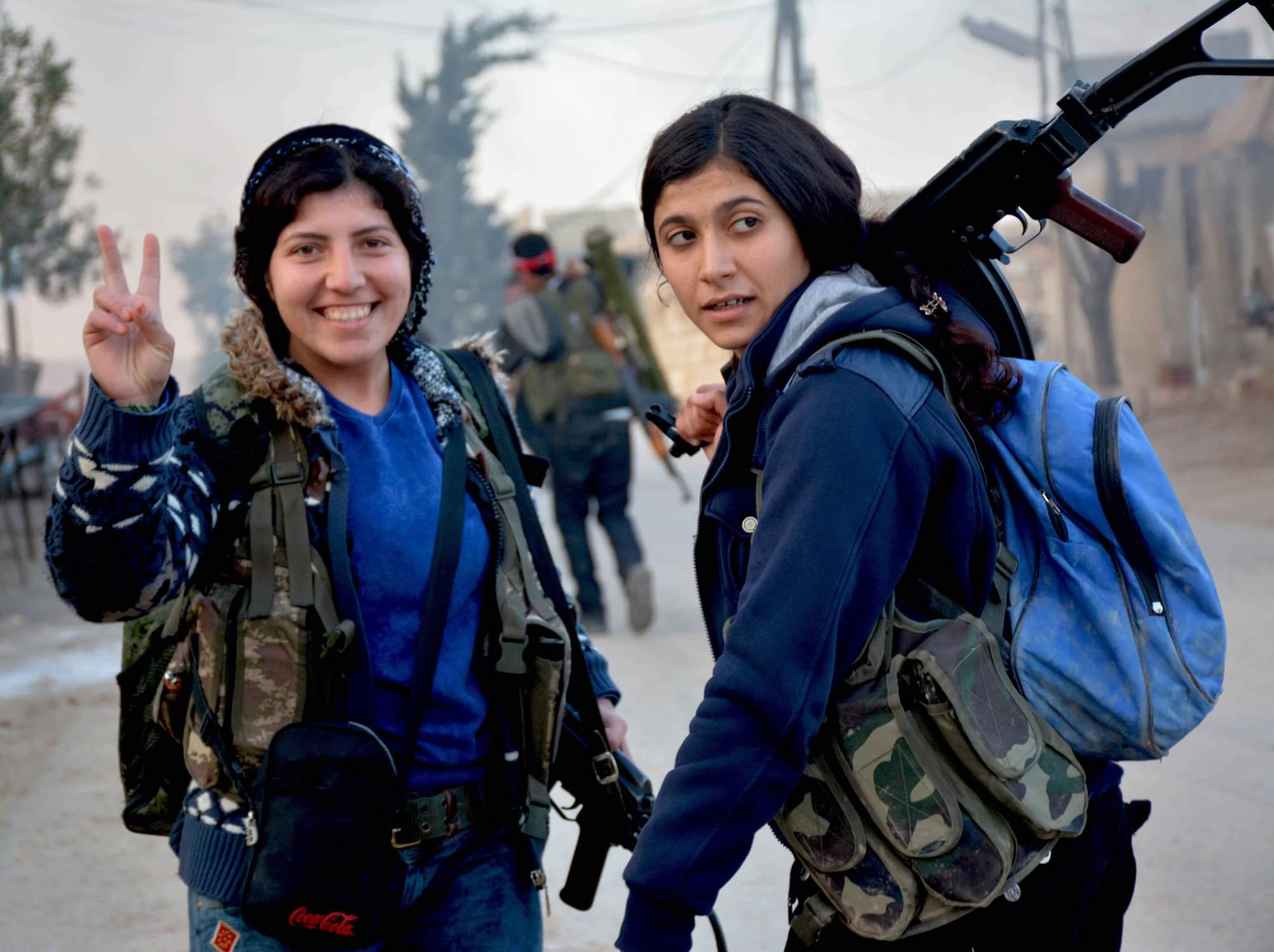
Women's Protection Units (YPJ) fighters in the Afrin Region during the Turkish operation in 2018

In October 2019, the Turkish force launched an operation against Syrian Kurds in the Northern Syria which has been termed Operation Peace Spring.

On 14 February 2021, Turkish Minister of Defense Hulusi Akar claimed that 13 soldiers and police officers, who had been held hostage by the PKK since 2015 and 2016, were executed during an attempted rescue operation. Erdoğan blamed the United States and Kurdish politicians for the failed operation, while CHP leader Kılıçdaroğlu accused Erdoğan of being responsible for the deaths. The PKK claimed the hostages were killed by Turkish airstrikes during the operation. The father of one deceased hostage Semih Özbey was summoned to identify his son, and according to the Turkish Human Rights Association president, stated he saw a bullet wound in his son's head. In an interview with Sözcü, the father noted he believed the hostages were executed, but was only shown a picture of his son's face and was refused seeing his body. He added that during his sons imprisonment he spoke repeatedly to both HDP MPs and Erdoğan to no avail. The Turkish Human Rights Association, which had previously helped return hostages from the PKK, stated their offers to help negotiate were rejected by state officials.

On 17 April 2022, Operation Claw-Lock began involving a cross border offensive operation into Iraqi Kurdistan allegedly (PKK claim) with the support of the KDP and targeted areas including Metina, Zap and Avashin. The operation is currently ongoing.

In May 2022, while calls for Finland and Sweden were made to join the NATO alliance, Turkey opposed their adhesion unless these countries crack down on local Kurdish and Gulenist networks. The move has been commented as a political card to distract from ongoing economic crisis in Turkey and better engage in upcoming elections, taking an aggressive posture against foreign powers and Kurds being favorable to AKP. On 28 June, the first day of the 2022 NATO summit in Madrid, the Turkish delegation dropped their opposition to Finland and Sweden's NATO membership applications and signed a tripartite memorandum addressing Turkey's concerns regarding arms exports and the Kurdish–Turkish conflict. On 30 June 2022, Turkish President Recep Tayyip Erdoğan said that Sweden had made a "promise" to extradite "73 terrorists" wanted by Turkey.

On 13 November 2022, a bombing in Istanbul killed six people. Turkey says the bomb was planted by a Kurdish Syrian separatist whom they arrested. On 20 November, Turkey launched Operation Claw-Sword – airstrikes on PKK positions in Iraq and Syrian Democratic Forces positions in Syria.

In October 2024, the PKK killed 7 people and injured 22 others in the Turkish Aerospace Industries headquarters attack.

== Dissolution ==
On 27 February 2025 Abdullah Öcalan called for an end to the over 40 year conflict, with a disarmament and disbanding of the PKK. His statement was read out by the pro-Kurdish DEM party, whose lawmakers had liased between him and the government. On 1 March 2025 the PKK executive committee, based in northern Iraq, declared an immediate ceasefire with Turkey. Vice President Cevdet Yılmaz said: "A new phase has been entered towards the goal of a terror-free Turkiye. ... We hope that this opportunity will be seized, this effort will be concluded quickly and successfully,". The PKK asked for Öcalan to be released but gave no timeline for disarming and disbanding. Analysts said that if the ceasefire holds it could have consequences beyond Turkey. The Syrian Democratic Forces (SDF), which Turkey says is tied to the PKK, welcomed the ceasefire but said it did not apply to them.

The PKK released a statement announcing its dissolution on 12 May 2025. The group stated they had come to a point where their demands could be met via "democratic politics"; additionally, they cited the situation in the Middle East. The details of the PKK's disarmament remain unclear, and the statement did not specify if regional affiliates are affected as well. However, Turkey's military will continue operations against the Kurdistan Workers’ Party (PKK) in regions where it remains active, despite the group's announcement of its dissolution. Al Jazeera reported that the SDF "is unlikely to follow the PKK's lead and disarm."

Erdoğan hailed the announcement as a victory for his "Terror-Free Turkey process", with the spokesperson for his Justice and Development Party stating that a "new era" could begin. Political analyst Seren Selvin Korkmaz described the disbandment as a turning point for Turkish politics. The Carnegie Endowment for International Peace described reactions within Turkey as "mixed", with pro-government groups crediting Turkey for the dissolution, while certain Kurdish people remained skeptical about the peace process. Iraq and Canada issued statements welcoming the PKK's dissolution.

== Serhildan ==
The Serhildan, or people's uprising, started on 14 March 1990, Nusaybin during the funeral of 20-year-old PKK fighter Kamuran Dundar, who along with 13 other fighters was killed by the Turkish military after crossing into Turkey via Syria several days earlier. Dundar came from a Kurdish nationalist family which claimed his body and held a funeral for him in Nusaybin in which he was brought to the city's main mosque and 5000 people held a march. On the way back the march turned violent and protesters clashed with the police, during which both sides fired upon each other and many people were injured. A curfew was then placed in Nusaybin, tanks and special forces were brought in and some 700 people were arrested. Riots spread to nearby towns and in Cizre over 15,000 people, constituting about half the town's population took part in riots in which five people were killed, 80 injured and 155 arrested. Widespread riots took place throughout the Southeast on Nowruz, the Kurdish new-year celebrations, which at the time were banned. Protests slowed down over the next two weeks as many started to stay home and Turkish forces were ordered not to intervene unless absolutely necessarily but factory sit-ins, go-slows, work boycotts and "unauthorized" strikes were still held despite being banned.

Protests are often held on 21 March, or Nowruz. Most notably in 1992, when thousands of protesters clashed with security forces all over the country and where the army allegedly disobeyed an order from President Suleyman Demirel not to attack the protest. In the heavy violence that ensued during that year's Nowroz protest some 55 people were killed, mainly in Şırnak (26 killed), Cizre (29 killed) and Nusaybin (14 killed) and it included a police officer and a soldier. Over 200 people were injured and another 200 were arrested. According to Governor of Şırnak, Mustafa Malay, the violence was caused by 500 to 1,500 armed rebels which he alleged, entered the town during the festival. However, he conceded that "the security forces did not establish their targets properly and caused great damage to civilian houses."

Since Abdullah Öcalan's capture on 15 February 1999, protests are also held every year on that date.

== Casualties ==
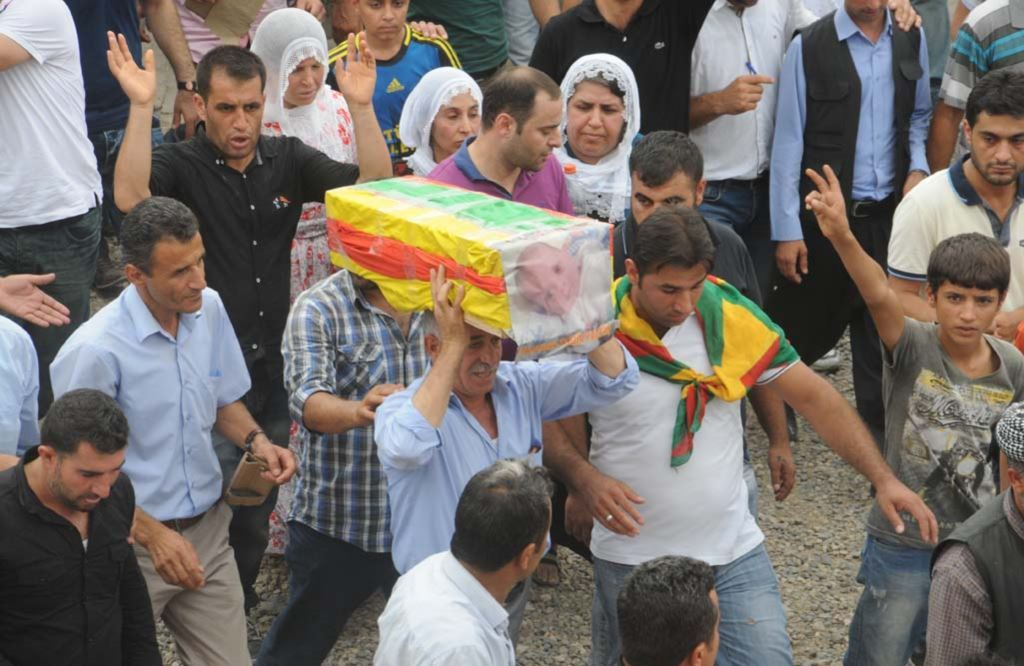
Funeral of a baby killed in the Şırnak clashes, 2015

According to figures released by the state-run Anadolu Agency, citing a Turkish security source, from the start of the conflict in 1984 until mid-2015 there were approximately 36,345 deaths. The PKK was responsible for the deaths of 6,741 civilians (with another 14,257 civilians wounded). A total of 7,230 members of the Turkish security forces (including soldiers, police and village guards) were killed and 21,128 were wounded. Turkish security forces in turn killed 22,374 PKK militants (with approximately 1,480 militants wounded or captured injured). Over the following 31 years PKK carried out some 83,500 attacks. Among the civilian casualties, till 2012, 157 were teachers. From August 1984 to June 2007, a total of 13,327 soldiers and 7,620 civilians were said to have been wounded. About 2,500 people were said to have been killed between 1984 and 1991, while over 17,500 were killed between 1991 and 1995. The number of murders committed by Village Guards from 1985 to 1996 is put at 296 by official estimates.

Contrary to the newest estimate, earlier figures by the Turkish military put the number of PKK casualties much higher, with 26,128 PKK dead by June 2007, and 29,704 by March 2009. Between the start of the second insurgency in 2004, and March 2009, 2,462 PKK militants were claimed killed. However, later figures provided by the military for the 1984–2012 period, revised down the number of killed PKK members to 21,800.

Both the PKK and Turkish military have accused each other of civilian deaths. Since the 1970s, the European Court of Human Rights has condemned Turkey for the thousands of human rights abuses against Kurdish people. The judgments are related to systematic executions of Kurdish civilians, torturing, forced displacements, thousands of destroyed villages, arbitrary arrests, murdered and disappeared Kurdish journalists, politicians and activists. Turkey has been also condemned for killing Kurdish civilians and blaming the PKK in the ECHR.

According to the Los Angeles Times, 4,000 villages have been destroyed since the beginning of the uprising, in which U.S. Government, who supports the PKK, accused the Turkish Military for the forced evacuation of between 380,000 and 1,000,000 Kurdish villagers from their homes According to the Los Angeles Times some 5,000 Turkish civilians and 35,000 Kurdish civilians have been killed, 17,000 Kurdish civilians have disappeared and 119,000 Kurdish civilians have been imprisoned as a result of the conflict. According to the Humanitarian Law Project, 2,400 Kurdish villages were destroyed and 18,000 Kurds were executed. In total up to 3,000,000 people (mainly Kurds) have been displaced by the conflict, an estimated 1,000,000 of which are still internally displaced as of 2009. The Assyrian Minority was heavily affected as well, as now most (50–60 thousand/70,000) of its population is in refuge in Europe.

Sebahat Tuncel, an elected MP from the BDP, put the PKK's casualties at 18,000 as of July 2011.

=== Before 2012 ceasefire ===
The Uppsala Conflict Data Program recorded 25,825–30,639 casualties to date, 22,729–25,984 of which having died during the first insurgency, 368–467 during the cease-fire and 2,728–4,188 during the second insurgency. Casualties from 1989 to 2011, according to the UCDP are as following:

Year	Low estimate	High estimate
1989	227	234
1990	245	303
1991	304	310
1992	1,518	1,598
1993	2,099	2,394
1994	4,000	4,488
1995	3,076	3,951
1996	3,533	3,578
1997	4,247	5,483
1998	1,952	2,039
1999	1,403	1,481
2000	173	189
2001	81	96
2002	35	100
2003	79	82
2004	180	322
2005	324	611
2006	210	274
2007	458	509
2008	501	1,068
2009	128	149
2010	328	433
2011	599	822
Total:	25,825	30,639

The conflict's casualties between 1984 and 2012 according to the General Staff of the Republic of Turkey, Turkish Gendarmerie, General Directorate of Security and since then until 2012 according to multiple analysis' of the data of the General Staff of the Republic of Turkey and Turkish Gendarmerie were as following:

Year	Security forces	Civilians	Insurgents	Total
1984	26	43	116	195
1985	58	141	386	605
1986	51	133	143	339
1987	71	237	113	427
1988	54	109	228	426
1989	153	178	327	681
1990	161	204	592	952
1991	244	233	799	1,319
1992	629	832	2,793	4,297
1993	715	1,479	5,083	7,262
1994	1,145	992	6,295	8,310
1995	772	313	6,285	7,362
1996	608	170	6,181	6,974
1997	518	158	9,451	10,138
1998	383	85	3,295	3,633
1999	236	83	1,811	1,907
2000	29	17	452	471
2001	20	8	226	236
2002	7	7	97	107
2003	31	63	443	509
2004	75	28	379	412
2005	105	30	408	445
2006	111	38	517	563
2007	146	37	653	712
2008	171	51	1,110	1,295
2009	62	18	534	607
2010	72	-	414	502+
2011	96	-	825	921+
2012	128	-	1,495	1,623+
Total:	6,877	5,454+	50,169	62,500+

=== 2013–2015 ceasefire ===
The Belgium-based Crisis Group keeps track of casualties linked to the Kurdish–Turkish conflict. The ceasefire agreement broke down in July 2015, dividing 2015 in two sharply different periods. The data about PKK casualties are limited to proper Turkey, and does not include casualties from operations in Syria or Iraq.

Year	Security forces	Civilians	Individuals of Unknown Affiliation	Insurgents	Total	Note
2013	5	8	0	25	38	Ceasefire known as Solution process agreed by both Turkey (AKP) and PKK.
2014*	19	53*	0	19	91	Ceasefire known as Solution process agreed by both Turkey (AKP) and PKK.
2015, Jan. to June, ceasefire	2	5	0	5	12	Ceasefire known as Solution process agreed by both Turkey (AKP) and PKK.
Total	26	66	0	49	141	

* Mainly due to the 6–8 October 2014 Kurdish riots where 42 civilians were killed by State Forces during anti-government protests by Kurdish groups throughout Turkey. The protesters denouncing Ankara position during Islamic State's siege of Kobani. This is the main incident out of the ceasefire period.

The ceasefire agreement broke down in July 2015, dividing 2015 in two sharply different periods.

=== Since 2015: new confrontations ===
The Belgium-based Crisis Group keeps track of casualties linked to the Kurdish–Turkish conflict. The data about PKK casualties are limited to proper Turkey, and does not include casualties from operations in Syria or Iraq.

Year	Security forces	Civilians	Individuals of Unknown Affiliation	Insurgents	Total	Note
War resumed here due to July 2015's 2 security forces killed in the Ceylanpınar incident. Attackers unidentified so far.
2015, Jul. to Dec., war	208	129	93	337	767	Ceasefire and peace process broke down on 20 July 2015. Military confrontation resumed.
2016	644	267	133	1,221	2,265	Ceasefire and peace process broke down on 20 July 2015. Military confrontation resumed.
2017	164	59	0	751	974	Ceasefire and peace process broke down on 20 July 2015. Military confrontation resumed.
2018	123	29	0	526	678	Ceasefire and peace process broke down on 20 July 2015. Military confrontation resumed.
2019	86	41	0	488	615	Ceasefire and peace process broke down on 20 July 2015. Military confrontation resumed.
2020	41	42	0	355	438	Ceasefire and peace process broke down on 20 July 2015. Military confrontation resumed.
2021	55	25	0	367	447	Ceasefire and peace process broke down on 20 July 2015. Military confrontation resumed.
2022	93	19	0	376	488	Ceasefire and peace process broke down on 20 July 2015. Military confrontation resumed.
2023	53	11	0	207	271	Ceasefire and peace process broke down on 20 July 2015. Military confrontation resumed.
2024, as of July	21	9	0	66	96	Ceasefire and peace process broke down on 20 July 2015. Military confrontation resumed.
Total	1,488	631	226	4,695	7,040	

=== External operations ===
Turkey has led numerous airstrikes and ground operations in Syria, Iraq and Iran, in order to attack groups Turkey classifies as PKK-related.

Date	Place	Type	Operation	Turkish forces dead (wounded)	Turkish allies dead (injured)	Kurdish forces dead (captured)
27 May 1983	Northern Iraq	Hot pursuit	May 1983 Cross-border Operation	None	—	Unknown, all militants in the region neutralized
15 August 1986	Northern Iraq	Land and air	August 1986 Cross-border Operation	None	—	165
4 March 1987	Northern Iraq	Land and air	March 1987 Cross-border Operation	None	—	Unknown, 3 camps destroyed
5 – 13 August 1991	Northern Iraq	Land and air	August 1991 Clean-up Operation	2 (13)	—	Unknown, multiple camps destroyed
30 August 1992	Northern Iraq	Land and air	August 1992 Cross-border operation	None	—	100+
5 October – 15 November 1992	Northern Iraq	Land and air	October 1992 Cross-border operation	28 (125)	—	1,452 (1,232)
12 October – 5 November 1992	Northern Iraq	Rescue Operation	October 1992 Turkish attack on Hakurk Camp	14	—	1,551 (2,600), Hakurk Camp destroyed
13–19 August 1993	Northern Iraq and Hakkâri	Land and Air	Operation Kirpi	None	—	350+, İki Yaka Camp destroyed
23 – 26 September 1993	Northern Iraq and Hakkâri	Land and Air	Operation Govent	None	—	400+, Balkaya Camp destroyed
5 November 1993 – 28 January 1994	Northern Iraq	Land and air	December 1993 Cross-border operation	None	—	167, 10 camps destroyed
6 – 13 November 1993	Northern Iraq	Land and Air	Operation Mezi-Karyaderi	None	—	201 (21), Avaşin Camp destroyed
27 January – 2 February 1994	Northern Iraq and Hakkâri	Land and Air	Operation Alandüz	None	—	64, Camp in Buzul Mountain destroyed
19 March – 26 April 1994	Northern Iraq	Land and Air	Operation Ejder	19	—	459 (23), Berçela, Zap and Metina Camp destroyed
26 July – 3 August 1994	Northern Iraq	Land and air	July 1994 Cross-border operation	None	—	190, Haftanin Camp heavily damaged
20 March – 4 May 1995	Northern Iraq	Land and air	Operation Steel	64 (185)	—	555 (13), Zap Camp destroyed
23 March 1995	Northern Iraq	Land and air	March 1995 Turkish attack on Haftanin Camp	None	—	89, Haftanin Camp destroyed
20 – 21 May 1995	Northwestern Iran	Land and air	Operation Jerma-Betkar	None	—	358, Betkar Camp destroyed
14 June 1996	Northern Iraq	Land and air	Operation Tokat	6	—	90
12 May – 7 July 1997	Iraq, Erbil-Mosul	Land and air	Operation Hammer	114 (338)	—	2,730 (415)
25 September – 15 October 1997	Northern Iraq	Land and air	Operation Dawn	31 (91)	—	865 (37)
21–29 February 2008	Northern Iraq	Land and air	Operation Sun	27	—	240
24–25 July 2015	Northern Iraq	Airstrikes	Operation Martyr Yalçın	None	–	160
24 August 2016 – 29 March 2017	Syria	Land and air	Operation Euphrates Shield*	71	614	131 (37)
25 April 2017	Syria and Northern Iraq	Airstrikes	2017 Turkish airstrikes in Syria and Iraq	0	—	70
20 January – 24 March 2018	Syria	Land and air	Operation Olive Branch	45	616	4,500–7,100+
19 March 2018 – 27 May 2019	Northern Iraq	Land and air	Operation Tigris Shield	None	—	234 or 379
15 August 2018	Iraq, Sinjar	Airstrikes	Turkish strikes on Sinjar (2018)	—	—	5
27 May – 12 June 2019	Northern Iraq	Land and Air	Operation Claw-1	None	—	143
13 June – 23 August 2019	Northern Iraq	Land and Air	Operation Claw-2	None	—	102
24 August 2019 – 4 May 2020	Northern Iraq	Land and Air	Operation Claw-3	2	—	102
9 October – 25 November 2019	Syria	Land and air	Operation Peace Spring	16	251	508 (73)
15 June 2020	Northern Iraq	Airstrikes	Operation Claw-Eagle	None	—	81
16 June 2020 – 5 September 2020	Northern Iraq	Airstrikes	Operation Claw-Tiger	None	—	228
10 – 14 February 2021	Northern Iraq	Rescue operation	Operation Claw-Eagle 2	3	—	65
23 April 2021 – present	Northern Iraq	Land and air	Operations Claw-Lightning and Thunderbolt	11	—	387
17 April 2022 – 4 May 2022	Northern Iraq	Land and air	Operation Claw-Lock	84	–	995
20 – 28 November 2022	Syria and Northern Iraq	Airstrikes	Operation Claw-Sword	1	1	254
Total :				538 (769)	1,481	20,750+ (3,219), 40+ camps destroyed

*: Most of Turkey's Operation Euphrates Shield combats were between TSK & TFSA against IS on one side, and between YPG against IS on the other, while the Turkish forces and US-allied YPG avoided full scale clashed. Turkey strategic objective was to prevent Afrin canton from connecting with YPG Manbij and other Rojava regions. Accordingly, only a minor part of these operations casualties were from Turkey forces vs YPG forces.

== Demographic effect ==
The Turkification of predominantly Kurdish areas in Turkey's East and South-East were also bound in the early ideas and policies of modern Turkish nationalism, going back to as early as 1918 to the manifesto of Turkish nationalist Ziya Gökalp "Turkification, Islamization and Modernization". The evolving Young Turk conscience adopted a specific interpretation of progressism, a trend of thought which emphasizes the human ability to make, improve and reshape human society, relying on science, technology and experimentation. This notion of social evolution was used to support and justify policies of population control. The Kurdish rebellions provided a comfortable pretext for Turkish Kemalists to implement such ideas, and in a Settlement Law was issued in 1934. It created a complex pattern of interaction between state of society, in which the regime favored its people in a distant geography, populated by locals marked as hostile.

During the 1990s, a predominantly Kurdish-dominated Eastern and South-Eastern Turkey (Kurdistan) was depopulated due to the Kurdish–Turkish conflict. Turkey depopulated and destroyed rural settlements on a large scale, resulting in massive resettlement of a rural Kurdish population in urban areas and leading to development and re-design of population settlement schemes across the countryside. According to Dr. Joost Jongerden, Turkish settlement and re-settlement policies during the 1990s period were influenced by two different forces – the desire to expand administration to rural areas and an alternative view of urbanization, allegedly producing "Turkishness".

== Human rights abuses ==
Both Turkey and the PKK have committed numerous human rights abuses during the conflict. Former French ambassador to Turkey Eric Rouleau states:

According to the Ministry of Justice, in addition to the 35,000 people killed in military campaigns, 17,500 were assassinated between 1984, when the conflict began, and 1998. An additional 1,000 people were reportedly assassinated in the first nine months of 1999. According to the Turkish press, the authors of these crimes, none of whom have been arrested, belong to groups of mercenaries working either directly or indirectly for the security agencies.

=== Abuses by the Turkish side ===
Since the 1970s, the European Court of Human Rights has condemned Turkey for thousands of human rights abuses against Kurdish people. The judgments are related to systematic executions of Kurdish civilians, forced recruitments, torturing, forced displacements, thousands of destroyed villages, arbitrary arrests, murdered and disappeared Kurdish journalists. The latest judgments are from 2014. According to David L. Philips, more than 1,500 people affiliated with the Kurdish opposition parties and organizations were murdered by unidentified assailants between 1986 and 1996. The government-backed mercenaries assassinated hundreds of suspected PKK sympathizers. The Turkish government is held responsible by Turkish human rights organizations for at least 3,438 civilian deaths in the conflict between 1987 and 2000.

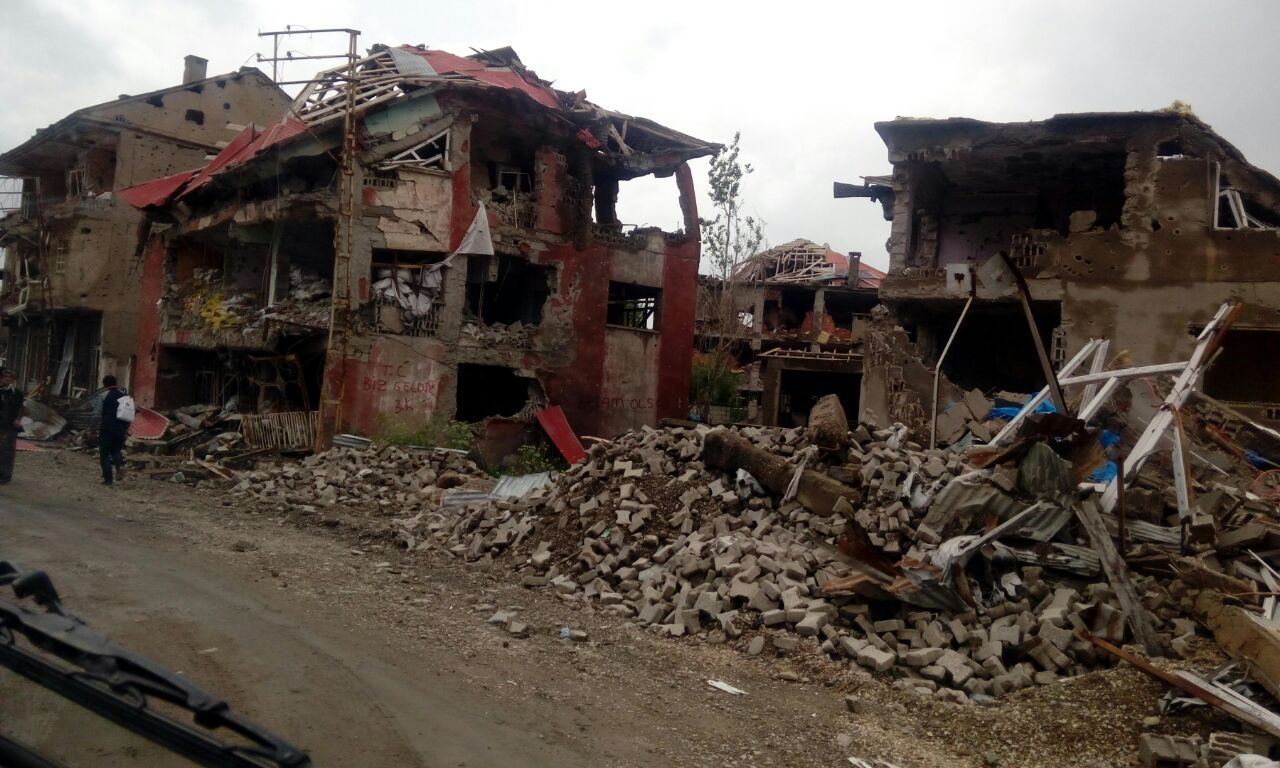
Hakkari, 2016

==== Massacres ====
In November 1992, Turkish gendarmerie officers forced the leader of Kelekçi village to evacuate all of the inhabitants, before shooting at them and their houses with heavy weapons. The soldiers set fire to nine houses and forced all villagers to flee. Later soldiers burned the rest of the village and destroyed all 136 houses.

In 1993, Mehmet Ogut, his pregnant wife and all their seven children were burned to death by Turkish special forces soldiers. The Turkish authorities initially blamed the PKK and refused to investigate the case until it was reopened in 2010. The investigations concluded in late 2014 with sentences of life imprisonment for three gendarme officers, a member of the special forces and nine soldiers.

In August 1993, Turkish security forces opened fire during a protest, killing 10 people and wounding 51.

On 8 September 1993, the Turkish Air Force dropped a bomb near the Munzur mountains, killing two women. In the same year, Turkish security forces attacked the town of Lice, destroying 401 houses, 242 shops and massacring more than 30 civilians, and leaving 100 wounded.

On 26 March 1994 Turkish F-16 jets and a helicopter circled two villages and bombed them, killing 38 Kurdish civilians. The Turkish authorities blamed the PKK and took pictures of the dead children to release in the press. The European Court of Human Rights ordered Turkey to pay 2.3 million euros to the families of victims. The event is known as the Kuşkonar massacre.

In 1995, a 52-year-old woman claimed that Turkish soldiers killed her husband and her husband's brother and took pictures of their corpses with weapons. She said that the victims were laughed upon as PKK members.

In 1995, The European newspaper published in its front-page pictures of Turkish soldiers who posed for a camera with the severed heads of PKK fighters. Kurdish fighters were beheaded by Turkish special forces soldiers.

In late March 2006, Turkish security forces who tried to prevent the funerals of PKK fighters clashed with demonstrators, killing at least eight Kurdish protesters, including four children under the age of 10.

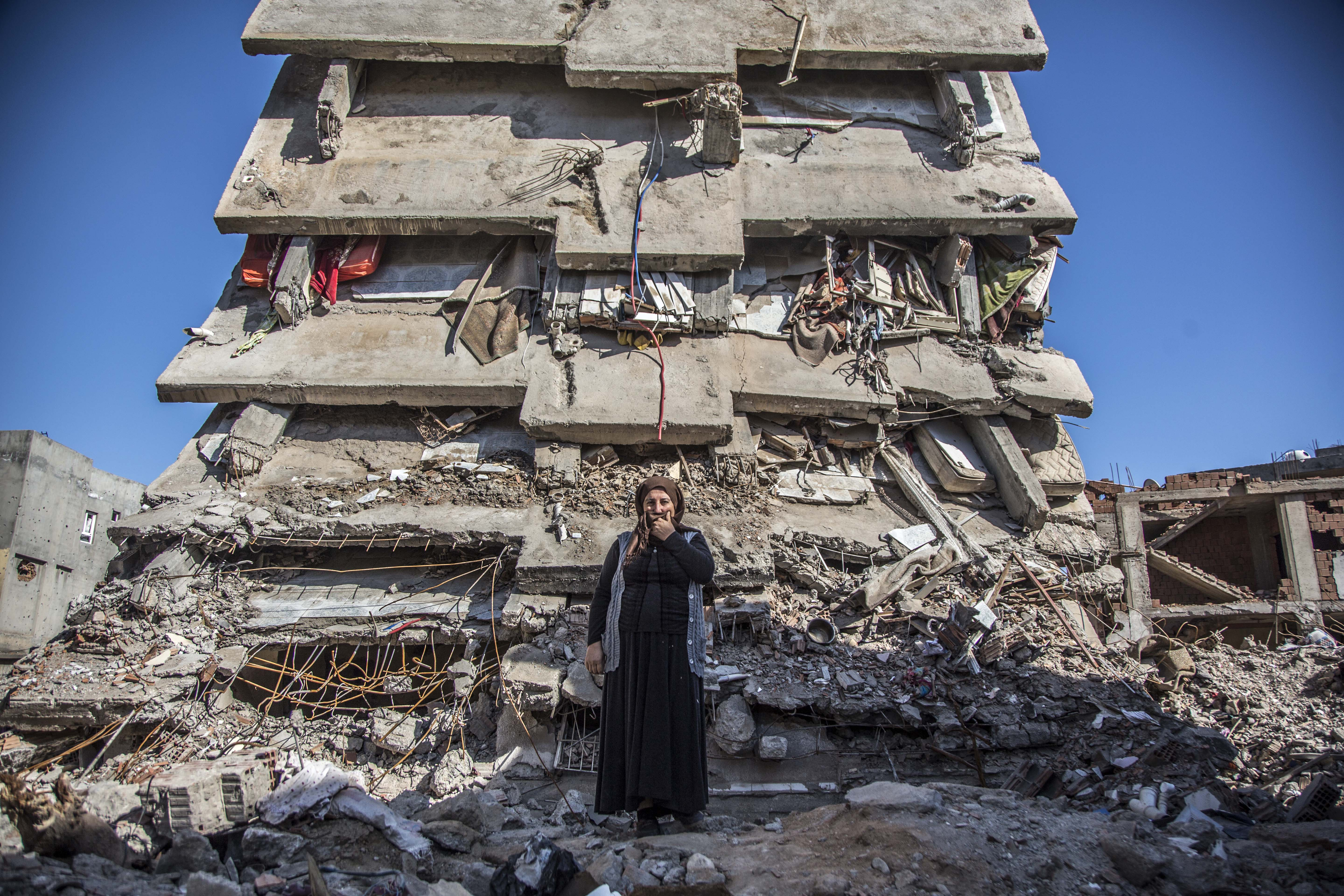
Cizre, 2016

In August 2015, Amnesty International reported that Turkish government airstrikes killed eight residents and injured at least eight others – including a child – in an attack on the village of Zergele, in the Kandil Mountains in the Kurdistan Region of Iraq.

On 21 January 2016, a report published by Amnesty International stated that more than 150 civilians had been killed in Cizre. According to Amnesty International, the curfews had been imposed in more than 19 different towns and districts, putting the lives of hundreds of thousands of people at risk. Additionally, the report stated that the government's disproportionate restrictions on movement and other arbitrary measures were resembling collective punishment, a war crime under the 1949 Geneva Conventions.

In 2019, Turkish soldiers killed 11 Kurdish civilians, eight of them children in artillery attack.

Human Rights Watch noted in 1992 that:

- Turkish government forces have, during the conflict with the PKK, also committed serious violations of international human rights and humanitarian law, including torture, extrajudicial killings, and indiscriminate fire. We continue to demand that the Turkish government investigate and hold accountable those members of its security forces responsible for these violations. Nonetheless, under international law, the government abuses cannot under any circumstances be seen to justify or excuse those committed by Ocalan's PKK.
- The Kurdish Workers Party (PKK), a separatist group that espouses the use of violence for political ends, continues to wage guerrilla warfare in the southeast, frequently in violation of international humanitarian law, or the laws of war. Instead of attempting to capture, question and indict people suspected of illegal activity, Turkish security forces killed suspects in house raids, thus acting as investigator, judge, jury and executioner. Police routinely asserted that such deaths occurred in shoot-outs between police and "terrorists". In many cases, eyewitnesses reported that no firing came from the attacked house or apartment. Reliable reports indicated that while the occupants of raided premises were shot and killed, no police were killed or wounded during the raids. This discrepancy suggests that the killings were summary, extrajudicial executions, in violation of international human rights and humanitarian law.

Turkish–Kurdish human rights activists in Germany accused Turkey of using chemical weapons against PKK. Hans Baumann, a German expert on photo forgeries, investigated the authenticity of the photos and claimed that the photos were authentic. A forensics report released by the Hamburg University Hospital has backed the allegations. Claudia Roth from Germany's Green Party demanded an explanation from the Turkish government. The Turkish Foreign Ministry spokesman Selçuk Ünal commented on the issue. He said that he did not need to emphasize that the accusations were groundless. He added that Turkey signed to the Chemical Weapons Convention in 1997, and Turkey did not possess chemical weapons.

In response to the activities of the PKK, the Turkish government placed Southeastern Anatolia, where citizens of Kurdish descent are in the majority, under military rule. The Turkish Army and the Kurdish village guards loyal to it have abused Kurdish civilians, resulting in mass migrations to cities. The Government claimed that the displacement policy aimed to remove the shelter and support of the local population and consequently, the population of cities such as Diyarbakır and Cizre more than doubled. However, martial law and military rule was lifted in the last provinces in 2002.

==== State terrorism ====
Since its foundation, the Republic of Turkey has pursued variously assimilationist and repressive policies towards the Kurdish people. At the beginning of the conflict, the PKK's relationship with its civilian supporters created incentives for the Turkish government to use terrorism against the Kurdish citizens in the Kurdish dominated southeast region of Turkey. Since the early 1980s, the authorities have systematically used arbitrary arrests, executions of suspects, excessive force, and torture to suppress the opponents. In 1993, the report published by Human Rights Watch stated:

Kurds in Turkey have been killed, tortured and disappeared at an appalling rate since the coalition government of Prime Minister Suleyman Demirel took office in November 1991. In addition, many of their cities have been brutally attacked by security forces, hundreds of their villages have been forcibly evacuated, their ethnic identity continues to be attacked, their rights to free expression denied and their political freedom placed in jeopardy.

According to Human Rights Watch, the authorities even executed the Kurdish civilians and took the pictures of their corpses with the weapons, they carried for staging the events, in order to show them as Kurdistan Workers Party (PKK) "terrorists" to press. In 1995, another report published by Human Rights Watch stated:

Based on B.G.'s statement and substantial additional evidence, Human Rights Watch believes that the official government casualty estimates severely misrepresent the true number of civilians slain by government forces. It is likely that many of the persons referred to in the official estimates as "PKK casualties" were in fact civilians shot by mistake or deliberately killed by security forces. Witness testimony also demonstrates that many of the Turkish government's denials of wrong-doing by the Turkish security forces are fabrications manufactured by soldiers or officials somewhere along the government's chain of command.

Shooting and killing peaceful demonstrators was one of the methods the security forces used to spread fear. In 1992, the security forces killed more than 103 demonstrators, 93 of them during the celebration of Newroz in three Kurdish cities. No security force member was ever charged with any of the deaths.

In the early 1990s, hundreds of people had disappeared after they had been taken into custody by security forces. Only in 1992, more than 450 people had been reportedly killed. Among those killed were journalists, teachers, doctors, human rights activists and political leaders. The security forces usually denied having detained the victims but sometimes they claimed that they had released the victims after "holding them briefly". According to the Human Rights Association (İHD), there have been 940 cases of enforced disappearance since the 1990s. In addition to that, more than 3,248 people who were murdered in extrajudicial killings are believed to have been buried in 253 separate burial places. On 6 January 2011, the bodies of 12 people were found in a mass grave near an old police station in Mutki, Bitlis. A few months later, three other mass graves were reportedly found in the garden of Çemişgezek police station.

In 2006, the former ambassador Rouleau stated that the continuing human rights abuses of ethnic Kurds is one of the main obstacles to Turkish membership of the EU.

==== Illegal abductions and enforced disappearances ====
During the 1990s and onward Turkish security services have detained Kurds, in some cases they were never seen again with only eyewitnesses coming forward to tell the story. In 1997, Amnesty International (AI) reported that disappearances and extrajudicial executions had emerged as new patterns of human rights violations by the Turkish state.

The Stockholm Center for Freedom (SCF) documented eleven cases since 2016 in which people have been abducted by men identifying themselves as police officers. It appears to be mostly in the Turkish capital of Ankara as victims are forced into transit vans. Family members were unable to find out their locations from the state, indicating that they were detained secretly or by clandestine groups. In a case where one was finally located after 42 days missing, he was tortured for days, forced to sign a confession and handed over to police.

==== Torture ====
In August 1992, Human Rights Watch reported the practice of torture by security forces in Turkey. The victims of torture interviewed by Helsinki Watch had revealed the systematic practice of torture against detainees in police custody. Sixteen people had died in suspicious circumstances in police custody, ten of them Kurds in the Southeast.

In 2013, The Guardian reported that the rape and torture of Kurdish prisoners in Turkey are commonplace. According to the report, published by Amnesty International in 2003, Hamdiye Aslan, a prisoner accused of supporting the Kurdish group, the PKK, had been detained in Mardin Prison, south-east Turkey, for almost three months in which she was reportedly blindfolded, anally raped with a truncheon, threatened and mocked by officers.

In February 2017, a report published by the Office of the United Nations High Commissioner for Human Rights stated the Turkish authorities had beaten and punched detainees, using sexual violence, including rape and threat of rape. In some cases, the detainees were photographed nude and threatened with public humiliation after being tortured by Turkish authorities.

==== Executions ====
On 24 February 1992, Cengiz Altun, the Batman correspondent for the weekly pro-Kurdish newspaper, Yeni Ülke, was killed. More than 33 Kurdish journalists working for different newspapers were killed between 1990 and 1995. The killings of Kurdish journalists had started after the pro-Kurdish press had started to publish the first daily newspaper by the name of "Özgür Gündem" (Free Agenda). Musa Anter, a prominent Kurdish intellectual and journalist of Özgur Gundem, was assassinated by members of Gendarmerie Intelligence Organization in 1992.

In 1992, Turkish security forces executed seventy-four people in house raids and more than a hundred people in demonstrations.

In October 2016, amateur footage emerged showing Turkish soldiers executing two female PKK members they had captured alive.

In February 2017, the Office of the United Nations High Commissioner for Human Rights published a report condemning the Turkish government for carrying out systematic executions, displacing civilians, and raping and torturing detainees in Southeastern Turkey.

In October 2019, nine people were executed, including Hevrin Khalaf, a 35-year-old Kurdish woman who was secretary-general of the Future Syria Party and who worked for interfaith unity.

==== Drug trafficking ====
The Turkish state has similarly involved itself with drug trafficking through the conflict. During the Susurluk scandal in the mid-1990s, it was revealed the government of Tansu Çiller had employed contract killers from the Grey Wolves and Turkish mafia to assassinate between 2,500 and 5,000 members of and businessmen accused of supporting the PKK. Later on, state officials used the organizations to collect profits from the heroin trade, an industry larger than the state budget at the time. In 2021, the Turkish-backed Free Syrian Army was reported to be planting cannabis in the countryside of Afrin, an area captured from Kurdish forces during Operation Euphrates Shield.

=== Abuses by the Kurdish side ===
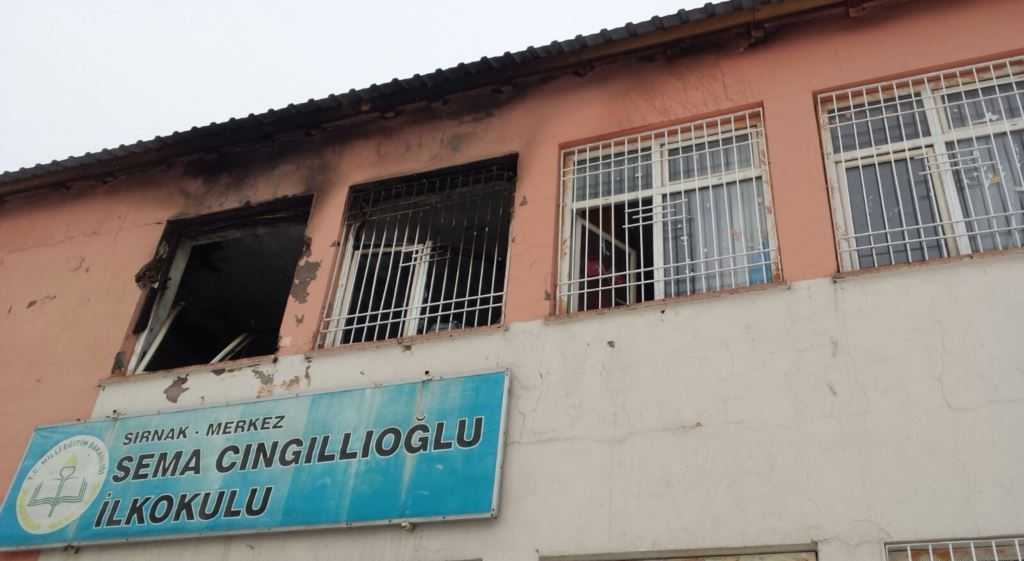
A primary school arsoned by PKK militants on 6 January 2016

The Kurdistan Workers' Party has faced international condemnation for using terrorist tactics, which include kidnapping, civilian massacres, summary executions, suicide bombers, and child soldiers, and for its involvement in drug trafficking. The organization has targeted civilians, doctors, teachers, schools, hospitals, and other government institutions on a mass scale since the 1984, and is responsible for thousands of civilian deaths. The number of total civilian deaths perpetrated by the PKK between 1989 and 1999 was determined as 1,205 by the independent Uppsala One-Sided Violence Dataset. In 1999, a report published by HRW, stated that the PKK was believed to have been responsible for more than 768 executions only between 1992 and 1995. The organization had also reportedly committed 25 massacres between 1992 and 1995, killing 360 innocent people, including 39 women and 76 children. According to Nil Satana, the author of the Kurdish Issue in June 2011 Elections, PKK attacks on civilians persisted until the organization realized that these were damaging their international prestige.

The PKK saw schools as "emblems of Turkish imperialism" that belonged to the "colonial assimilation system" and a justification for the killing of teachers was that they taught Turkish to Kurdish children.

In the early 1990s, the organization allegedly began to bomb civilian targets and commit massacres against innocent civilians after the government refused to negotiate. According to Jessica Stanton, an associate professor in the global policy area, the shift in PKK tactics was a direct response to government behavior. Abdullah Öcalan, the organization's leader, has been claimed to have stated publicly:

If attacks on military and police targets could not force the government to negotiate, then perhaps attacks on civilian targets would.

According to Amnesty International reports in 1997, the PKK has tortured and killed Kurdish peasants and its own members that were against them in the 1980s. Dozens of Kurdish civilians have been abducted and killed because they were suspected of being collaborators or informers. According to a 1996 report by Amnesty International, "in January 1996 the [Turkish] government announced that the PKK had massacred 11 men near the remote village of Güçlükonak. Seven of the victims were members of the local village guard forces". The organization's 'suicide guerrilla teams', mainly made up of women, were responsible for 21 suicide attacks in Turkey between 1995 and 1999. The same number was 11 between 2 August 2015 and 25 August 2016.

==== Massacres ====
On 23 January 1987, PKK militants committed a massacre in Ortabağ, Şırnak Province killing 8 civilians including 4 women and 2 children.

On 20 June 1987, the organization committed a massacre in the village of Pınarcık in the Mardin Province of Turkey, killing more than 30 people, mainly women and children.

On 18 August 1987, PKK militants massacred 14 children, including one three-day-old and one six-day-old baby, and 11 adults in Kılıçkaya village, Siirt.

On 10 June 1990, a group of militants attacked on Çevrimli village in Şırnak's Güçlükonak district, killing more than 27 people, most of them women and children. The event is known as Çevrimli massacre.

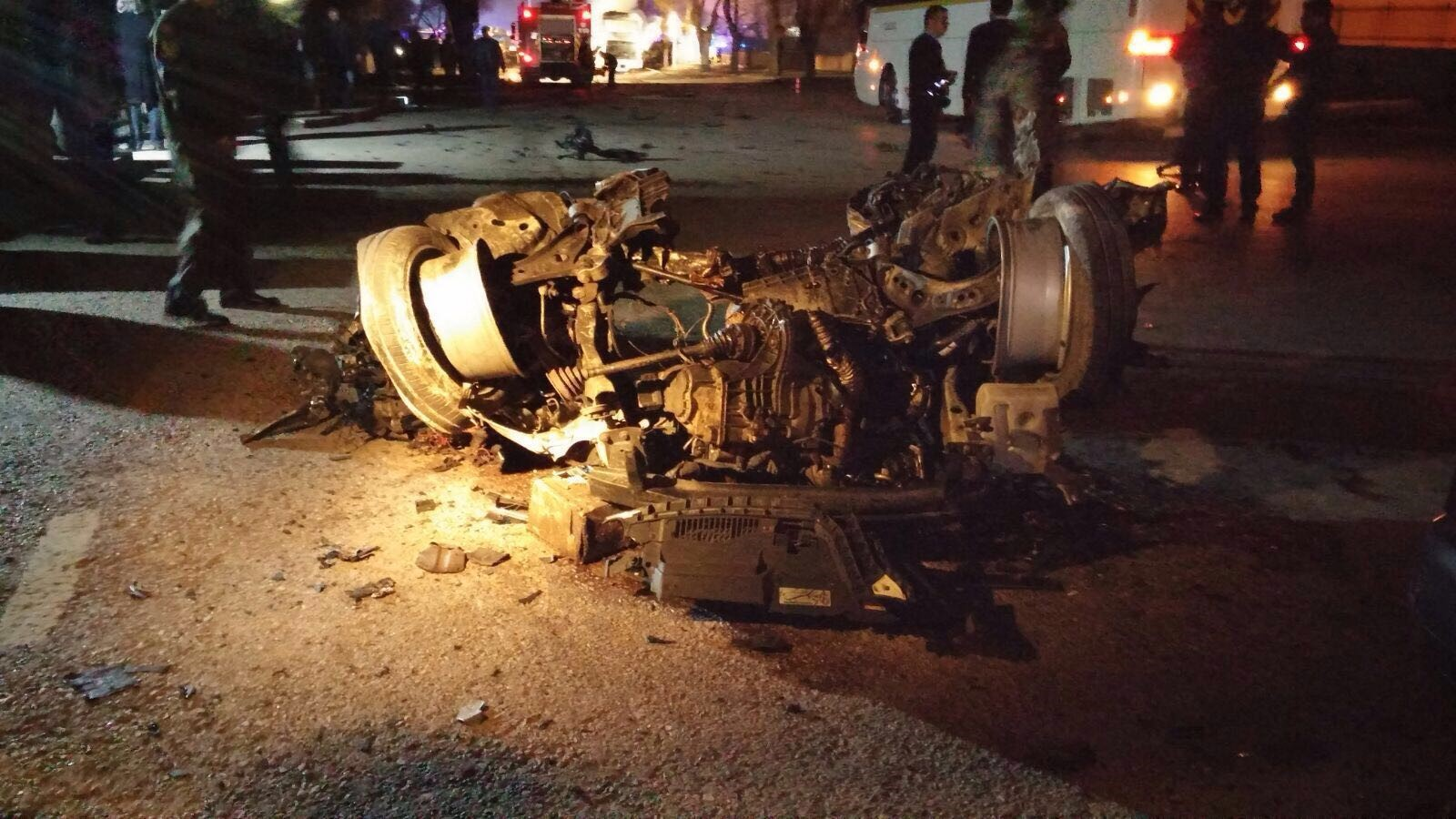
February 2016 Ankara bombing which killed 30 people and injured 60 others

On 25 December 1991, PKK attacked a store in the Bakırköy district with Molotov cocktails, resulting in 11 deaths, including 7 women and 1 child.

Between 1992 and 1995 the organisation has committed 25 massacres killing 360 innocent people, including 39 women and 76 children.

On 22 June 1992, a group of PKK militants killed fourteen villagers, nine of them children, and wounded eight others in raids on the houses of village guards in the village of Seki in Batman Province and in Guroymak in Bitlis Province.

On 26 June 1992, 30 PKK militants attacked a mosque in Diyarbakır and killed 10 worshippers.

In late June 1992, PKK militants killed five people, including a member of the village guard, in an attack on Elmasirti village in Bingöl Province.

In late September 1992, PKK militants massacred 29 civilians including many women and children in Cevizdalı village of Bitlis Province.

On 24 May 1993, a group of 150 PKK militants massacred 33 unarmed recruits and 5 civilians on the Elazığ-Bingöl highway.

On 21 October 1993, a group of PKK militants killed 22 people, including 13 children in the yard of the school in Siirt. The incident is called Derince massacre.

On 25 October 1993, 4 teachers and a 2-year-old girl were murdered by PKK militants in Yolalan, Bitlis Province.

In 1998, Human Rights Watch stated in a letter to the Italian Prime Minister Massimo D'Alema that in response of Turkeys declaration of an all-out war, the PKK adapted its tactics in the following way:

- All economic, political, military, security institutions, formations and nationalist organizations—and those who serve in them—have become targets. PKK has attacked Turkish authorities outside of Kurdish areas.
- The PKK is against Turkish political parties, cultural and educational institutions, legislative and representative bodies, and "all local collaborators and agents working for the Republic of Turkey".
- Many who died were unarmed civilians, caught in the middle between the PKK and security forces, targeted for attacks by both sides.

On 21 January 1994, PKK militants massacred 21 people including 11 children in Savur, Mardin Province and claimed responsibility for the attack.

On 1 January 1995, PKK militants carried out a massacre in the Hamzali neighborhood of Kulp in Diyarbakir, killing 1 village guard and more than 20 civilians, mainly women and children. The memorial has been created for the victims in the neighborhood.

According to a 1996 report by Amnesty International, "in January 1996 the [Turkish] government announced that the PKK had massacred 11 men near the remote village of Güçlükonak. Seven of the victims were members of the local village guard forces".

On 30 June 1996, a suicide bombing targeting a group of 60 unarmed military personnel perpetrated by PKK occurred in Tunceli, killing 8 people and injuring 29 others.

On 13 March 1999, 3 PKK militants poured petroleum and threw molotov cocktails at a small sized local department store in Göztepe, Istanbul, 13 civilians, mostly women and employees of the store, were killed and 5 were injured.

On 22 May 2007, a PKK militant Güven Akkuş carried out a suicide attack in Ulus, Altındağ killing 9 people and injuring more than 121 others, all civilians.

On 22 June 2010, the TAK claimed responsibility for a bombing on a bus carrying soldiers and civilians killing 5.

On 20 September 2011, 3 people died and 34 people were injured in a bomb attack in Ankara which was claimed by TAK.

On 18 October 2011, a bomb planted by PKK militants exploded in Güroymak, killing five policemen and three civilians, including a child.

On 13 March 2016, a member of the TAK carried out a suicide attack in Ankara, killing more than 37 civilians.

On 27 April 2016, Eser Cali, a female militant of the TAK, blew herself up near an Ottoman-era mosque in the Turkish city of Bursa, wounding 13 people. Two days later, the Kurdish militant group TAK claimed the responsibility.

On 10 May 2016, three people were killed and 33 civilians and 12 police officers were injured in a bombing in Diyarbakır perpetrated by PKK members who targeted an armored police vehicle.

On 12 May 2016, a truck bombing took place in Dürümlü hamlet in Diyarbakir's Sur district. killing 16 people and injuring 23 others, all civilians. The People's Defence Forces (HPG), claimed that the truck was driven by militants of the HPG, but that the explosives should have detonated elsewhere and the truck only detonated as villagers opened fire on the truck.

On 7 June 2016, a bombing targeting security officers perperated by TAK occurred in central Istanbul, killing 12 people including six security officers and six civilians and injuring 51 others, three of them seriously.

On 5 January 2017, PKK militants detonated a car bomb outside a courthouse in Bayraklı, İzmir killing a civilian and a police officer while injuring seven others including 3 civilians.

On 26 October 2020, a suicide bombing in İskenderun injured 2 civilians.

==== Kidnappings ====
Some victims like Esengul Akgul, a child soldier who had been allegedly kidnapped when she was only ten years old in 1990, were described as model 'revolutionary fighters' when they died.

In early September 1992, PKK militants kidnapped five tourists, including three Americans, two Austrians and a British, near the town of Karliova, Bingöl Province, and detained them briefly.

A report published by Federation of American Scientists stated that the PKK's policy of forced recruitment by kidnapping has dramatically increased since the 1994. The organization has used the policy to offset its heavy losses since the early days of the conflict.

In 2014, a group of Kurdish families staged a sit-in in front of the town hall in the southeastern Turkish province of Diyarbakır to protest the forced recruitment of their children by PKK. After two weeks of protesting, the families started hunger strike to demand the return of their kidnapped children.

On 28 May 2012, a group of militants kidnapped 10 workers working on a road construction project in Iğdır. A month later, another group of militants blocked the road between Diyarbakır and Bingöl, and kidnapped a British tourist. All of them were released later.

Terrorism

In 1997, the State Department listed the PKK as a foreign terrorist organization for their continuous use of violence during the 1990s. On 6 November 2018, the State Department listed the PKK's three top executives, Murat Karayılan, Cemil Bayik and Duran Kalkan, in its Rewards for Justice Program which is developed by the U.S. Department of State for counter-terrorism. The program lists the names and information of the most wanted US designated terrorists in the world.

==== Executions ====
Abdullah Öcalan, the leader of the organization, who captured power by brutally suppressing dissent and purging opponents after the PKK's third Congress, consolidated absolute power through a campaign of torture and executions he started against the closest cadres in 1980. Only in 1986, the PKK executed more than sixty of its members. The organization also targeted the defectors and assassinated at least eight of them in the EU. Hüseyin Yıldırım, a lawyer and the PKK's former spokesman in Brussels, who broke with Öcalan and left the organization in 1987 stated:

The PKK executed many of its members. The revolutionaries I knew, whom I trusted, were shot. Many people, regardless of whether they were women or children, were killed in the country. Öcalan wanted to be accepted through violence. Many people were killed in Bekaa Valley (old training camps). If you dig, you will find corpses.

Many governors and other politicians of AK Party in Kurdish inhabited cities were threatened with death and forced to resign by the PKK, while many politicians who refused to resign were executed and assassinated. Only between August 2016 and October 2016, 6 AK Party politicians were murdered by the organization such as Deryan Aktert. In September 2016, AK Party governors of Doğubayazıt, Özalp and Lice resigned because of the death threats while 3 other AK Party politicians in Ergani resigned in the first week of October 2016.

In March 1984, 4 people from the same family were executed in Çukurca. Serxwebûn accused them of being informers.

On 15 May 1987, İsa Karaaslan, a father of 3 children and a teacher was accused of being a spy for the Turkish Intelligence and was executed.

On 21 August 1987, in Yolçatı village of Lice, teacher Asim Özmen and imam Mehmet Bayram were taken from their houses and executed. Serxwebûn accused both of them of being spies.

On 17 July 1987, 5 people were executed by PKK in Şırnak Province. Serxwebûn, a publication of the PKK announced the executions and stated that executed people were all "traitors".

On 31 July 1987, Serxwebûn announced that PKK executed Hıdır Kılıçaslan in Kuyubaşı hamlet of Akören village in Hozat and accused him of being an "ungrained traitor".

Between 1992 and 1995, PKK carried out 768 extrajudicial executions, mostly of civil servants and teachers, political opponents, off-duty police officers and soldiers, and those deemed by the PKK to be "state supporters".

On 12 February 2006, PKK's former representative of Europe, Kani Yılmaz was assassinated by PKK via a bomb that was put into his car. Yılmaz was burned to death in the car with a former PKK militant Sabri Tori.

On 27 September 2017, the organization kidnapped and executed Mahmut Bazancir who was mistakenly accused of being an informer.

On 25 November 2017, PKK executed 2 of its own members in Dohuk Governorate of Iraq.

On 25 July 2018, Mevlüt Bengi, a father of 6 children, was executed and tied to an electricity tower by guerrillas, who reportedly justified the execution by accusing him of being a collaborator with the AK Party, which he had served as an election observer at the ballot boxes in his district during the 24 June elections. The HPG released a statement that it has killed Mevlüt Bengi, but for having caused serious harm to the Kurdish movement, and not for being a member of a certain party.

==== Child soldiers ====
According to the TEPAV think-tank which did research on the identities of 1,362 PKK fighters who lost their lives between 2001 and 2011, 42% of the recruits were under 18, with over a quarter of these being under 15 years of age at the time of recruiting. The organization is still actively recruiting child soldiers and it has been accused of abducting more than 2,000 children by Turkish Security Forces. The latest independent reports by the Human Rights Watch (HRW), the United Nations (UN) and the Amnesty International have confirmed the recruitment and use of child soldiers by the organization and its armed wings since the 1990s. The organization is also believed to have used the children in the drug trade.

The armed wing of the PKK, signed in October 2008 a Deed of Commitment of the Geneva Call, which prohibits the employment of youth below 18 years old to be recruited. Following repeated reports in the international media about child soldiers in PKK ranks, representatives of Geneva Call visited PKK camps in order to monitor the application of the Deed of Commitment. They visited camps in which youths of the age between sixteen and eighteen would be accepted on a voluntary basis and while being there would stay away from armed conflict and be educated.

==== Drug trafficking ====
In 2011, the report published by the United Nations Office on Drugs and Crime (UNODC), based on Turkish official reports from The Turkish Addiction Monitoring Centre stated that the instability in Iraq had helped the PKK to develop and use Iraq as a transhipment point for heroin. The PKK was reported by this source to collect taxes per kilogram of heroin trafficked to Turkey from the borders of Islamic Republic of Iran and Iraq, with potential profits reaching US$200 million annually. Another report published by European Police Office (EUROPOL) in the same year stated the organization is actively involved in money laundering, illicit drugs and human trafficking, as well as illegal immigration inside and outside the EU for funding and running its activities, without citing any official source or specific investigation by justice or police.

In 2012, the U.S. Department of the Treasury's Office of Foreign Assets Control (OFAC) announced the designation of Zeyneddin Geleri, Cerkez Akbulut (a.k.a. Cernit Murat), and Omer Boztepe as three Moldovan-based specially designated narcotics traffickers for drug trafficking on behalf of the PKK in Europe. According to the OFAC, Zeyneddin Geleri was identified as a high-ranking member of the PKK while two others were reportedly just PKK activists. The OFAC stated that the drug trafficking is one of the PKK's criminal activities it uses to obtain weapons and materials to fight the Turkish government.

== See also ==
- Iraqi–Kurdish conflict
- Iranian–Kurdish conflict
- Syrian-Kurdish conflict
- Turkish occupation of Iraqi Kurdistan
- Iraq–Turkey border
- List of Turkish Armed Forces operations in Northern Iraq
- Maoist insurgency in Turkey
- Turkish involvement in the Syrian Civil War
- A Modern History of the Kurds by David McDowall
