= October 1992 Turkish attack on Hakurk Camp =

1992 cross-border operation

- Part of the Kurdish–Turkish conflict (1978–present)
Date	12 October – 1 November 1992
Location	Iraqi Kurdistan
Result	Turkish victory: PKK's heavily defended and fortified Hakurk Camp is destroyed.; KRG–PKK cease-fire; 2 captured Turkish soldiers rescued by Turkish forces; All routes between Turkey and Iraqi Kurdistan re-opened
Territorial changes	PKK flees from Hakurk Region.

Belligerents
Turkey	Kurdistan Workers' Party (PKK)

Commanders and leaders
Unknown	Abdullah Öcalan; Faruk Bozkur; Murat Karayılan

Units involved
Turkish Armed Forces; Turkish Land Forces; 5th Commando Brigade; Brigade Headquarters; 1st Commando Battalion, Order 70/4, 71/1, 71/2; 2nd Commando Battalion, Order 71/3, 71/4; 3rd Commando Battalion, Order 72/1, 72/2; Artillery Battalion, Order 71/1, 71/3; Special Forces Command; 309th Combat Search and Rescue; Turkish Air Force; Hakkâri 12th Land And Air Aviation Squadron; 9 UH-60; 2 UH-1; Hakkâri Assault Helicopter Battalion; 2 AH-1W; 2 AH-1P	Hakurk Region Camp

Strength
2,512 Commandos; 36 Special Forces personnel 30 Helicopter pilots	10,000+ PKK members

Casualties and losses
14 killed	1,551 killed 2,600+ captured 2,700 wounded
- No civilian losses.

October 1992 Turkish attack on Hakurk Camp (Turkish: Ekim 1992 Hakurk Kampı saldırısı) was a cross-border operation by the Turkish Armed Forces into northern Iraq between 12 October and 1 November 1992, that was conducted during the October 1992 Turkish incursion into Northern Iraq, against the Kurdistan Workers Party (PKK) which is listed as a terrorist organization internationally by a number of states and organizations, including the United States, NATO and the EU. More than 70,000 people have been killed in the Kurdish–Turkish conflict since 1984.

== Prelude ==
On April 8, 1992, Iraqi Kurdish leaders agreed to stop the PKK's raids into Turkey from their territory in an attempt to create good relations with Turkey. In response, the PKK cut supply routes from Turkey to Iraqi Kurdistan on July 31. To re-open the supply roots, Peshmerga loyal to the Kurdistan Democratic Party and the Patriotic Union of Kurdistan (Iraqi Kurdistan's ruling parties), started an offensive on October 4 to drive the PKK from northern Iraq.

== The Operation ==
On August 6, the Turkish Air Force launched air raids to support Iraqi Kurdish forces in their offensive against the PKK. After the air raids, Turkey launched an operation against the PKK, with 2,500 commandos, backed by APCs, helicopters, and aircraft. It was estimated the PKK had over 10,000 fighters in the region. Turkey killed and captured 2,783 PKK fighters and wounded 2,700 by November 5, with another 1,000 surrendering to Iraqi Kurdish forces, a number which rose to 1,400 by 12 November. In mid-November Turkish forces started to withdraw the region after occupying Hakurk. According to PKK authorities, the PKK had only lost 150 fighters during the operation.

As a result of the operation, Hakurk Camp was not getting any support from other regions inside Iraq so they were running out of men and supplies, PKK commanders also found it increasingly difficult to communicate with Abdullah Öcalan, who was in Syria at the time. Therefore, his brother Osman Öcalan agreed to meet with Prime Minister of Iraqi Kurdistan Fuad Masum on October 30 to negotiate. The negotiations were supported by Faruk Bozkur but were opposed by Murat Karayılan, which were the two other main commanders in northern Iraq. On November 17, the Kurdistan Regional Government (KRG) and the PKK reached a truce accord under which the PKK would re-open all routes to Turkey and release 2 captured Turkish soldiers. A buffer zone between Iraq and Turkey was to be created to prevent further PKK activities, however, according to Turkish officials this did not happen due to a lack of cooperation from the KRG.

== See also ==
- August 1986 Turkish incursion into northern Iraq
- August 1992 Şırnak Clashes
- Turkish army winter campaign of 1994–1995
- Operation Steel
- Operation Hammer (1997)
- Operation Dawn (1997)
- Operation Murat
