= Turkish incursion into northern Iraq =

Turkish incursion into northern Iraq may refer to one of the following:

- August 1986 Turkish incursion into northern Iraq
- March 1987 Turkish incursion into northern Iraq
- December 2007 Turkish incursion into northern Iraq
- 2008 Turkish incursion into northern Iraq
- March 2016 Turkish incursion into northern Iraq
