= June–August 2012 Hakkari clashes =

June–August 2012 Hakkari attacks
- Part of Kurdish–Turkish conflict
Date	19 June – 11 August 2012
Location	Hakkâri Province, Turkey northern Iraq
Result	Turkish victory

Belligerents
Turkey	Kurdistan Workers' Party (PKK)

Commanders and leaders
Necdet Özel	Bahoz Erdal; Reşit Dostum; İskender Derik; Yılmaz Kürdo

Strength
5,000; 60 tanks 70 armored vehicles	200–250 (Dağlıca attack); 600+ (Şemdinli events)

Casualties and losses
(Dağlıca attack) 8 killed, 10 wounded (Şemdinli events) 2 killed (Çukurca attack) 5 killed	(Dağlıca attack) 26–32 killed (Şemdinli events) 100+ killed (Çukurca attack) 14+ killed

The June 2012 Hakkari clashes were a series of clashes between the Kurdistan Workers' Party (PKK) and the Turkish Army near Şemdinli in Hakkâri Province in southeastern Turkey and northern Iraq (Northern and Southern Kurdistan). The clashes began on June 19, with a coordinated PKK attack on a Turkish Army post in Yuksekova town near the Iraq-Turkey border. On July 20–21, the PKK made an attempt to capture territory in Şemdinli, resulting in a Turkish counter-offensive which, according to Turkish security forces, resulted in eight Turkish security forces and 130 Kurdish militants killed. The Kurdistan Communities Union (KCK) recorded over 400 incidents of shelling, air bombardment and other armed clashes during August 2012. The events were described as the "heaviest fighting in Turkey in years".

== Events ==
=== June 2012 clashes ===
Clashes started on June 19, with a PKK attack on a military outpost in Dağlıca, that resulted in the death of 8 Turkish soldiers. The attack was ordered by Bahoz Erdal, organized by Reşit Dostum and İskender Derik and carried out by 200–250 fighters under command of Yılmaz Kürdo. The Turkish state responded by deploying 5,000 Turkish troops supported by war planes, cobra helicopters and howitzers in a counter operation that killed 26 PKK fighters according to Turkish sources. According to the PKK Press Office HPG-BIM, 109 Turkish soldiers had been killed and over 100 had been wounded in the clashes. They also claimed to have shot down four Sikorsky helicopters and damaged nine others, while 15 PKK fighters had lost their lives during the clashes.

On June 20, the Turkish military said warplanes and helicopters have struck PKK rebel targets inside the Kurdistan region in Iraq's north, in response to the recent PKK attack near the Iraqi border.

=== Şemdinli district events ===
Since July 21, Hakkari's Şemdinli district became the scene of PKK attempt to establish dominance. When on July 21 security forces checked roads near Şemdinli, following correspondence with Ankara, the military unit in the district went to the region only to see that the PKK militants had fled. As the security forces returned to the military barracks, the PKK blocked roads and interrogated locals. Turkish security forces found out that some PKK members had moved into the city center. At the same time, around 100 militants from the Iranian border began to move to Şemdinli from two different areas. Their goal was apparently to create a "liberated area". Turkish unmanned aerial vehicles then detected the mobility of the militants and relayed this information to the relevant military units. The Şemdinli Regimental Command sent commandos in pursuit of the militants, who infiltrated into Turkey from the Iranian border. Military units were also sent to the area. In the first clash, 20 soldiers were injured while many PKK members were killed. Then, military operations were conducted targeting the militants in the city centers. Turkish security forces found out, according to images provided by unmanned aerial vehicles, that many PKK members were killed. Soldiers searching the areas in rural parts of Şemdinli have so far found the bodies of six PKK militants. It is thought that 120 PKK members were killed, although only six bodies were found. Meanwhile, helicopter crash killed 5 Turkish soldiers and wounded 7 others in Hakkari province on July 21. Turkish Armed Forces (TSK) stated that the helicopter was down due to power dissipation while it was landing.

According to the press, the event was a part of the PKK major plan to take control of Şemdinli, making preparations to this effect but failing to achieve its goal. The PKK however claimed to have created a "liberated area" in Şemdinli's Derecik region.

=== Çukurca attack ===
Eight members of the Turkish security forces were killed late Aug. 4 in a PKK attack on military outposts in Hakkari's Çukurca district, according to Turkish Interior Minister İdris Naim Şahin. 14 PKK members, including a female suicide bomber, died in the attack.

== Casualties ==
- June clashes – Turkish side 2-109 killed, 10–100 wounded; PKK side 15–32 killed.
- July Şemdinli events – Turkish side 20 wounded; PKK side 6–120 killed.
- August Çukurca attack – Turkish side 8 killed.

== Aftermath ==
On 3 September PKK attacked government buildings in the city of Beytülşebap. 10 Soldiers were killed in this attack. However Turkish Forces repelled the offensive and 20 PKK fighters were killed. Five days later on 8 September Turkish forces launched a new operation against PKK. During this operation 155 PKK fighters were claimed to be killed. During this operation PKK attacked Güzelyurt outpost 1 soldier and 1 village guard wounded 24 PKK fighter also killed. On the night of the 19 September, 60 tanks and 70 armoured vehicle reinforced Turkish Forces in war zone. This was one of the biggest supply operation for several years in region. After heavy casualties PKK changed its tactics and begin to setting ambushes with mines. During this attacks 4 soldier and 8 police killed. After this attack PKK fighters pulled back. On 22 September Turkish Forces located rebels hideout and launched a new offensive against them. On 24 September pkk fighters attack a Turkish outpost at 15:00 hours. But there is no Turkish soldier or PKK fighter killed in this attack. After this attack Turkey changed tactics. Their new code is 'always more offensive and more pressive'. With this Turkish Forces planning to take every mountain under their control instead of sweeping large zones with patrols and waiting at outposts.

Hakkari, Şırnak, Diyarbakır, Muş, Tunceli, Batman, Van, Siirt and Bingöl were selected as the primary operational points for cleaning the rebels. Government declared that 'After this point Turkish Forces will do everything they can for ending this war 'Operation called 'Last Spring Cleaning' On 25 September Turkish Forces located two rebels. While fighting one of the rebel killed with a bullet from head. After this another rebel killed within second. This two are the first victims of Turkey's new strategy (always more offensive and more pressive). At the same time 30 another rebel group circled in Tunceli. İn the city pkk attacked police force and killed 6 policeman. Fighting continued in the province and streets of Tunceli. With their new operation Turkish forces cleaned most of PKK from Şemdinli.
