= Operation Tokat =

- Part of the Kurdish–Turkish conflict
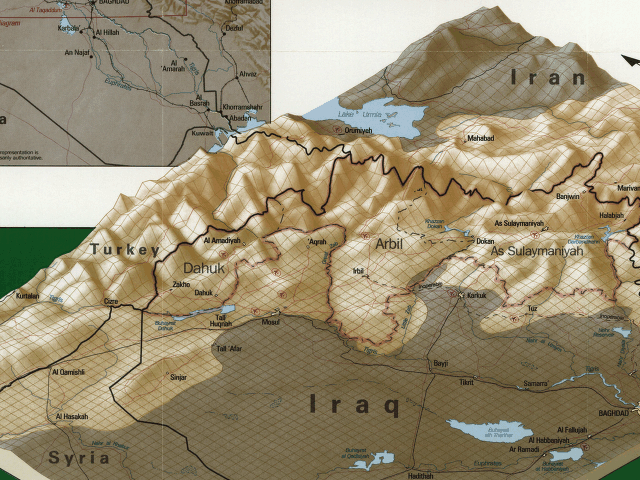
- 3D map of the North Iraq area
Date	June 14, 1996
Location	Kurdistan Region, Iraq
Result	Turkish victory

Belligerents
Turkey	PKK

Casualties and losses
6 deaths	90 deaths

Operation Tokat (Turkish: Tokat Harekâtı) was an operation by the Turkish Air Forces and Turkish Land Forces into northern Iraq on 14 June 1996 against the Kurdistan Workers' Party (PKK). It was part of a larger operation called Operation Steel. After the operation, Turkish government claimed that 6 Turkish troops and 90 PKK rebels were killed.
