= Assassination of Deryan Aktert =

2016 murder in Dicle, Turkey

- Location: 27 Mayıs neighbourhood, Hani district road, Dicle, Diyarbakır Province, Turkey
- Date: October 10, 2016; 10 years ago 22:35 (UTC+3)
- Target: Deryan Aktert
- Attack type: Assassination
- Deaths: Deryan Aktert X
- Perpetrator: People's Defence Forces

Deryan Aktert, chairman of Dicle district for the Justice and Development Party (AKP), was shot by a group of seven or eight people at a gas station owned by him in Dicle on 10 October 2016, around 22:35 TSİ.

== Background ==
Following a collapse of a peace process for the Kurdish–Turkish conflict, a conflict between the Turkish government and various Kurdish insurgent groups, mainly Kurdistan Workers' Party (PKK), many governors and other politicians of AKP in Kurdish inhabited cities were threatened with death and forced to resign by the PKK, while many politicians who refused to resign were assassinated.

=== Deryan Aktert ===
Deryan Aktert, who was elected as the chairman of Dicle district on 17 November 2014 was a main target of threats and assaults, as he was often threatened by Kurdish militants. Two assassination attempts were made against him, the last one being a shooting incident in 2015 in his workplace, which failed.

== Assassination ==
On 10 October, around 22:35 TSİ, Aktert was shot with long-barreled weapons by a group of seven or eight people at a gas station owned by him in Dicle. He was heavily injured as a result of the gunshots and was rushed to the Dicle State Hospital, where he died. The perpetrators escaped the crime scene with a car they stole. An operation was later launched in the region to arrest the assassins. People's Defence Forces (HPG), armed wing of the Kurdistan Workers' Party (PKK) claimed responsibility for the assassination, as well as murder of a village guard named Ahmet Adıyaman.
