= Nizamettin Taş =

PKK military commander

- Born: 1961 (age 64–65); Varto, Turkey
- Military career
- Allegiance: Kurdistan Workers' Party
- Active: 1986–2003
- Rank: Military Commander
- Nickname: Botan Rojhilat
- Conflicts: Kurdish–Turkish conflict

Nizamettin Taş (born 1961 in Varto), also known as Botan Rojhilat , was one of the oldest military commanders of the PKK. He was born in Varto, Turkey, and joined the PKK in 1986 and became the military commander of the organisation in 1995.

He headed the People's Liberation Army of Kurdistan, the military wing of the PKK and was a member of the PKK Central Committee. He also served in the PKK's Presidential Council. He left the PKK in 2004 after a fall out with concurring members of the PKK leadership and formed the Patriotic Democratic Party (PWD) together with Osman Öcalan and Kani Yilmaz. But the party was short-lived and did not become important. He lives in Iraqi Kurdistan.

Preceded by Cemil Bayık	Military Commander of the PKK; 1995 – 2004	Succeeded by Fehman Hûseyn
