= 2008 Aktütün attack =

Clash in Şemdinli, Hakkâri, Turkey

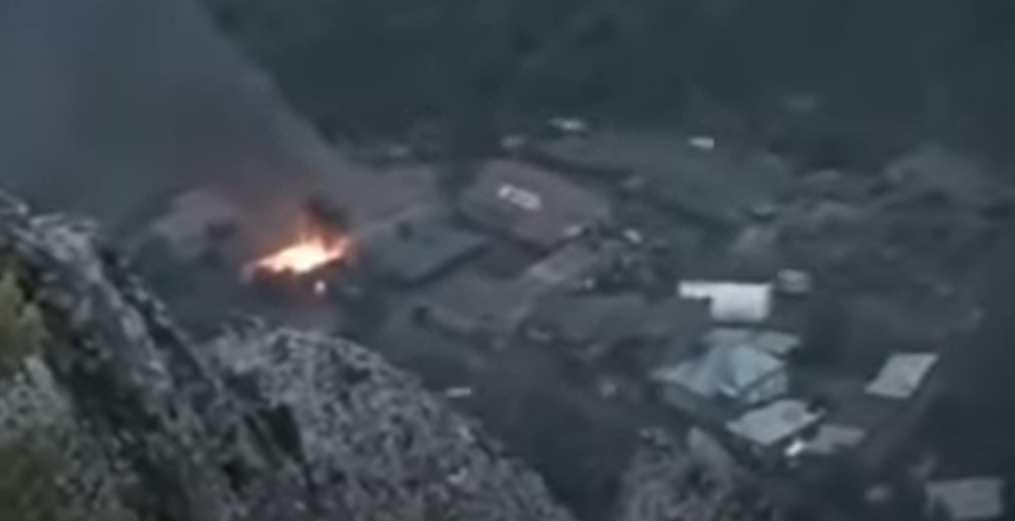
- Video screenshot of Aktütün in 2008
Date	October 3, 2008
Location	Aktütün, Şemdinli 37°2′N 44°12′E
Result	Turkish victory • PKK fails its objective to steal weapons and ammunition & is forced to retreat.

Belligerents
Turkey	PKK

Strength
62	120–350

Casualties and losses
17 dead 21 injured	23 dead
- Location within Turkey

The 2008 Aktütün attack was a terrorist attack by PKK (Kurdistan Worker’s Party, a Marxist Leninist terrorist group as recognized by the US, EU, Turkey etc.) on conscript soldiers doing their duty at a border guard point which took place on 3 October 2008 at the Aktütün Gendarmerie Border Station in the Şemdinli district of Hakkari.

The conflict took place at the 13th Gendarmerie Border Company Command, which is 4 kilometers from the Iraqi border and 40 kilometers from the Iranian border. 17 Turkish soldiers died and 21 were injured, two of them seriously, when 120 to 350 PKK members opened fire at the station with heavy weaponry from the surrounding heights. 23 PKK members were killed. During the conflict, two soldiers were reported missing and are thought to be dead.

A variety of weapons were used in the attack, including anti-aircraft guns and different types of missiles. The attack was filmed by PKK members with three separate cameras and later published on various websites used by the organization for propaganda purposes.The footage includes footage of the PKK members armed with mules and members of the organization before the attack, the attack on the police station, and even how they crossed the Turkish border.

== Conflict ==
The clash started around 14:00 when PKK members surrounded the station from three different hill areas and fired on the station, and continued until midnight. Various weapons, including anti-aircraft guns and different types of missiles were used by the PKK members in the attack. This attack was recorded by PKK members with three different cameras and later broadcast on various websites used by the organization for propaganda purposes. Before the attack, there are sections showing how the PKK members crossed the Turkish border to the region, the attack on the border station, and even how they crossed the Turkish border. In the evening hours, PKK members went closer to the border station and recorded different images there, and tried to infiltrate the border station with the aim of seizing the weapons and ammunition of the Turkish security forces in the border station. However, as a result of the intense fire and resistance of the Turkish security forces at the border station, the PKK members had to retreat.

== Reactions and media ==
On 8 October 2008, Taraf newspaper carried a news report claiming that the raid was reported sixteen days in advance of the actual conflict and that the Turkish Armed Forces did not take the necessary precautions. In the news, which also included satellite images, it was claimed that the Internal Security Operation status reports and instant intelligence information transmitted by unmanned aerial vehicles informed the General Staff of the Aktütün raid a month ago. Thereupon, the Military Court of General Staff imposed a broadcast ban on Taraf's news. Chief of General Staff İlker Başbuğ gave a very harsh statement by holding a press conference. "I urge everyone to be careful and be in the right place," he said in a statement to the press.

In the same evening, one of the three photographs revealed by the coordinates of the photographs, published in the main news bulletin of Kanal 1 and Star TV and by writing the coordinates of the photographs in the satellite observation program Google Earth, showed Aktütün and Bayraktepe. The party stood by its claims and stated that the region between 37 and 02-23 north parallel and 44-12-44 east meridians points to a point a little more than 1 kilometer away from Aktütün, and this can be understood when checked in Google Earth program. 1 denied the allegations.

A lawsuit was filed against Adnan Demir, the Editor-in-Chief of the Taraf newspaper, who was accused of "disclosure of prohibited information" belonging to the General Staff, with a demand for imprisonment between 3 and 5 years. Adnan Demir was acquitted of the case.
