= Kani Yilmaz =

Kurdish political activist (1952–2006)

Kani Yılmaz
- Born: 1950; Ceylanpınar, Şanliurfa Province, Turkey
- Died: 11 February 2006 (aged 53–54); Sulaymaniyah, Iraqi Kurdistan
- Cause of death: Car bombing
- Organization: Kurdistan Workers' Party (PKK)
- Known for: Founding member of Kurdistan Workers' Party

Kani Yılmaz, officially Faysal Dunlayıcı (1950 – 11 February 2006), was a Kurdish political activist in Turkey and one of the founding members of the Kurdistan Workers' Party.

== Early life ==
Yılmaz was born in 1952 in Ceylanpınar, a town in Şanlıurfa Province, Turkey to a Kurdish family. Yılmaz completed his early education at local Kurdish institutions.

== Role in the PKK ==
Yılmaz became one of the founding members of the Kurdistan Workers' Party (PKK) in the 1970s. Within the PKK, he took on roles including that of a military strategist and international spokesperson. He was arrested during the September 12 Coup and spent 12 years in Diyarbakır Military Prison.

Kani Yılmaz led the Kurdistan National Liberation Front, a PKK sub-organization, in Europe for several years. On October 26, 1994, he was arrested in Great Britain and extradited to Germany in 1997 and brought to trial. His charges included "55 robberies and 59 arson attacks against Turkish consulates, banks, and businesses." At least one person was killed. At the Düsseldorf Trials in 1998, he was sentenced to 7.5 years in prison for aggravated arson. He was released with the verdict – after serving half of his sentence, including time spent in pre-trial detention. However, by the early 2000s, Yılmaz parted ways with the PKK due to ideological differences, citing concerns over the organization's direction under Abdullah Öcalan's leadership. In 2004, he renounced the PKK and Abdullah Öcalan and founded an opposition organization called "Partiya Welatparêzên Kurdistan" (PWD) with Osman Öcalan, Abdullah Öcalan's brother.

== Assassination ==
On 11 February 2006, Yılmaz was killed in a car bombing in Sulaymaniyah, Iraqi Kurdistan. Many leaders across the region publicly mourned his passing.

He had previously been labeled a traitor in a message from the PKK's Reconstruction Committee read out on Roj TV on August 25, 2004. The Society for Threatened Peoples assumes that the PKK committed the murder. The PWD stated that the organization had been infiltrated by a PKK member who planted a bomb in Kani Yılmaz's car. The perpetrator was allegedly a member of Murat Karayılan's bodyguard. His code name was Numan. The family reported that Kani Yılmaz had previously received death threats from the PKK.

== See also ==
- Kurdistan Workers' Party
