= Operation Steel =

1995 Turkish operation in Iraq

Operation Steel Çelik Harekâtı
- Part of the Kurdish–Turkish conflict
Date	20 March – 4 May 1995
Location	Northern Iraq
Result	Turkish victory: Operational success

Belligerents
Turkey	Kurdistan Workers' Party (PKK)

Commanders and leaders
(Turkey) Hasan Kundakçı	Abdullah Öcalan

Strength
100,000	2,400–5,000

Casualties and losses
64 killed 185 wounded	555–568 killed 13 captured

Operation Steel (Turkish: Çelik Harekâtı) was a cross-border operation by the Turkish Armed Forces into northern Iraq between 20 March and 4 May 1995 against the Kurdistan Workers' Party (PKK). The invasion of Iraqi Kurdistan was a short term military operation and ended with both sides losing heavy casualties .

== The Operation ==
On March 20, 1995, some 100,000 Turkish troops launched an invasion into northern Iraq. The effect of the attack was however relatively limited, despite high PKK casualties, as the majority of the PKK forces fled the region to not be killed by the Turkish forces before the offensive begun. They had noticed the military buildup on the border and were anticipating the offensive. By April 25, Turkey pulled out 20,000 of its 100,000 troops. On May 3, after the Kurdistan Democratic Party delegation to Turkey said that they would stop PKK activities in Iraqi Kurdistan, Turkey withdrew its remaining forces on May 4. The military operation strained relations between Turkey and the United States and Europe, as over 15,000 Iraqi Kurdish civilians were displaced by Turkish forces.

== See also ==
- Operation Hammer (1997)
- Operation Dawn (1997)
- Iraqi Kurdish Civil War
