= March 1987 Turkish incursion into northern Iraq =

1987 cross-border operation

- Part of the Kurdish–Turkish conflict
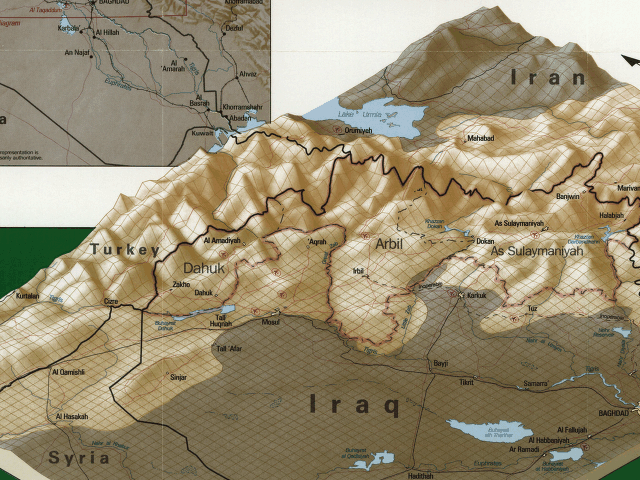
- 3D map of the North Iraq area
Date	4 March 1987
Location	northern Iraq
Result	Turkish victory

Belligerents
Turkey	PKK

Strength
30 war planes	Unknown

Casualties and losses
None	3 Camps destroyed, exact casualties unknown

The March 1987 Turkish incursion into northern Iraq, by the Turkish Air Force, began on 4 March 1987, when the Turkish Military bombed Kurdistan Workers' Party (PKK) targets in northern Iraq. 30 war planes were used in the operation and 3 major PKK camps (codenamed Sırat, Era and Alamış by Turkey) was bombed.
