= Bahoz Erdal =

PKK military commander

- فەهمان حوسێن
- Born: Fehman Hüseyin; 3 August 1969 (age 57); Al-Malikiyah, Al-Hasakah Governorate, Syria
- Other name: Bahoz Erdal
- Education: Damascus University
- Military career
- Allegiance: PKK
- Service years: 1992–2026
- Rank: Commander
- Nickname: Dr. Bahoz Erdal
- Unit: HPG
- Known for: Military commander of the PKK
- Conflicts: Kurdish–Turkish conflict; 2011 Hakkâri attack

Bahoz Erdal, also known as Fahman Husein (Kurdish: Fehman Hûseyn, also spelled Fehman Hüseyin) (born 3 August 1969), is a commander in the Kurdistan Workers' Party (PKK). He is originally from Al-Malikiyah (Kurdish: Dêrik) in Syria. In 2016 the Turkish state claimed him to have been killed, although this later turned out to be false.

== Biography ==
Erdal, a Syrian Kurd, was born in Dêrik (Al-Malikiyah), Syrian Kurdistan, in 1969. He studied to be a veterinarian at the University of Damascus School of Medicine, thus nicknamed 'Doctor'.

Following PKK's leader Abdullah Öcalan's capture in 1999, he shared the leadership of the PKK with Murat Karayılan and Cemil Bayık, commanding the armed branch HPG particularly.

He served as the head of the People's Defence Forces (HPG), the PKK's armed wing from June 2004 until July 2009, when he was replaced by Sofi Nurettin.

Since 2004 he has been part of the three-man PKK Executive Committee, including acting PKK leader Murat Karayılan and PKK co-founder Cemil Bayik, who preceded Bahoz Erdal as the PKK's military commander.

Some Turkish security analysts claimed in 2011 that Erdal is the leader of the Kurdistan Freedom Hawks (TAK).

Since 28 October 2015, he has been in the red category of the "Most Wanted Terrorists" list published by the Ministry of Interior of the Republic of Turkey. The Ministry announced that a reward of up to 10 million TL will be given to the person or persons who catch him or share information that will result in his capture.

He appeared on a video in April 2017 and addressed Turkish citizens about the 2017 Turkish constitutional referendum.

It has been claimed that Erdal was among a group of PKK leaders in command positions of the People's Defense Units, the armed wing of the Syrian Democratic Union Party during the Syrian Civil War.

== Alleged July 2016 assassination ==
According to Turkey's official state news agency Anadolu Agency, and the Daily Sabah citing Anadolu Agency, he was killed in Syria on 8 July 2016. A person under the name of Halid el Hasekavi, spokesman of an anti-regime armed group named Tel Hamis Brigades, told an AA correspondent that Hüseyin was allegedly targeted near northern Syrian city of Qamishli. He claimed that Hüseyin's car was blown up at 8:30 p.m. on 8 July, being killed along with eight people including his guards. On 12 July, the government aligned daily newspaperYeni Şafak quoted the Turkish MİT intelligence service as the source of this story, whilst sources close to PKK and Kurdish freedom movement denied these claims, with a spokesperson for the HPG stating that “Our comrade commander Bahoz Erdal is continuing with his duty in Kurdistan.”

The story was firmly debunked a day later however, when Erdal gave a radio interview to Voice of Kurdistan radio, stating that "the AKP government is lying, it is stuck. Whenever the Rojava revolution takes a step forward, whenever the Islamic State is struck, fear sets into the Turkish government and it attacks Rojava.", going on to elaborate, "In the past few days Turkish media has been saying that I was targeted in an attack in Rojava, near Qamishli. I really didn't want to respond to these claims. The Kurdish people know that the colonialist Turkish state is trying to hide the truth. They are trying to trick the people and society with lies and propaganda." and later thoroughly deconstructed as fake by international media.

Preceded by Nizamettin Taş	Military Commander of the PKK; June 2004 – June 2009	Succeeded by Sofi Nurettin
