= Operation Hammer (1997) =

Turkish military move against Kurdish terrorists in Iraq

- Part of the Kurdish–Turkish conflict and Iraqi Kurdish Civil War
Date	12 May – 7 July 1997
Location	Northern Iraq
Result	Turkish and KDP victory: Operational success

Belligerents
Turkey; Kurdistan Democratic Party (KDP)	Kurdistan Workers' Party (PKK); Patriotic Union of Kurdistan (PUK)

Commanders and leaders
(Turkey) Altay Tokat; Masoud Barzani	Abdullah Öcalan; Jalal Talabani

Strength
30,000–50,000 soldiers 10,000 village guards	5,000–6,000 PKK fighters

Casualties and losses
Turkey: 114 killed, 338 wounded 1 AH-1W Super Cobra; KDP: ~200 killed Total: 314 killed	PKK: 2,730 killed, 415 captured

Operation Hammer (Turkish: Çekiç Harekâtı) was the largest cross-border operation done in the history of Turkish Armed Forces into northern Iraq between 12 May and 7 July 1997 against the Kurdistan Workers' Party (PKK).

The operation's objectives were to destroy PKK units in northern Iraq, to strengthen Masoud Barzani's Kurdistan Democratic Party in its ongoing Civil War with Jalal Talabani's Patriotic Union of Kurdistan in the hope that the KDP would prevent further PKK raids into Turkey, and to counter Iranian influence in the region as Turkey accused Iran of supporting the PKK, and over 2,000 Iranian forces had entered Iraqi Kurdistan that year to aid the PUK.

== Conflict ==
Some 30–50,000 Turkish forces entered Iraq on 14 May in response to an appeal by the Kurdistan Democratic Party for support in its offensive against the PKK. On May 17th, with the support of Turkey, the KDP stormed the Heyva Sor (Kurdish Red Crescent)-run hospital in Hewlêr (Erbil) and conducted a massacre known as the Hewlêr massacre or Heyva Sor hospital massacre, executing about 80 patients (mostly wounded ARGK soldiers). On May 19th, the KDP launched a military operation to evacuate all PKK fighters from their capital in Erbil, which turned into a major battle in which 53 KDP and 58 PKK fighters were killed. In response the PKK ordered four suicide bombings from 1 to 11 June which resulted in the death of 55 KDP fighters. By 7 July, when Turkish forces withdrew, over 2,000 PKK and at least 200 KDP forces had been killed.

The operation drew strong condemnation from Iraq, Iran and Syria.

Turkey launched another large-scale operation in September known as Operation Dawn.

== International reaction ==
- Iran: The Iranian government condemned the invasion "as not only a violation of all international laws but the sovereign rights and territorial integrity of the Iraqi Muslim nation" and denounced Turkish claims of Iranian support for the PKK as "a joint conspiracy by the Turkish military and Israel."

== See also ==
- Operation Steel (1995)
