= August 1986 Turkish incursion into northern Iraq =

- Part of the Kurdish–Turkish conflict
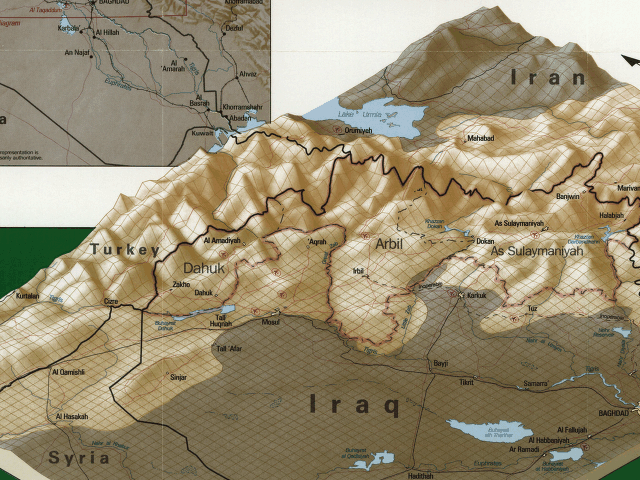
- 3D map of the North Iraq area
Date	15 August 1986
Location	northern Iraq
Result	Turkish victory

Belligerents
Turkey	Kurdistan Workers' Party (PKK)

Strength
8,000 troops 10 war planes	Unknown

Casualties and losses
None	165 killed

The August 1986 Turkish incursion into northern Iraq, by the Turkish Air Forces and Turkish Land Forces, began on 15 August 1986, when the Turkish Military bombed Kurdistan Workers' Party (PKK) targets in northern Iraq and Turkish troops crossed the Iraqi border as a respond to PKK attack in Uludere, Hakkari on 12 August 1986 which killed 12 Turkish soldiers and injured 10 others.

== Operation ==
On 15 August 1986, at 06:00, 10 war planes started bombing PKK targets and 8,000 Turkish troops crossed the border after informing the Iraqi government about the planned operation due to a security agreement signed between 2 nations in 1984. In 15 minutes, Turkish war planes destroyed several shelters owned by PKK and bombed 3 major PKK camps (codenamed Lolan, Nebadiye and Lak-1 by Turkey). At 17:30, then Prime Minister of Turkey Turgut Özal announced that around 100 PKK militias were killed so far and operation was going to continue. As a result of the operation, 165 PKK militias were killed. Casualties among Turkish troops remains unknown meanwhile it's known that none of the 10 war planes were destroyed or damaged.

=== Alleged Soviet help ===
According to Turkish sources, some of the captured PKK militias confessed that there were many Soviet officers in PKK camps and a PKK camp in Syria was ruled by Soviet officers.
