= Operation Dawn (1997) =

Turkish victory over the Kurdistan Workers' Party

- Part of the Kurdish–Turkish conflict and Iraqi Kurdish Civil War
Date	25 September – 15 October 1997
Location	Iraqi Kurdistan
Result	Turkish and KDP victory

Belligerents
Turkey; Kurdistan Democratic Party (KDP)	Kurdistan Workers' Party (PKK); Patriotic Union of Kurdistan (PUK)

Commanders and leaders
(Turkey) İsmail Hakkı Karadayı	Ali Haydar Kaytan

Strength
Turkey: 15,000; KDP: 8,000 Total: 23,000	2,000–3,000

Casualties and losses
31 killed 91 wounded	865 killed 37 captured

Operation Dawn (Turkish: Sabah Harekâtı) was a cross-border operation by the Turkish Armed Forces (in conjunction with the forces of the Kurdistan Democratic Party) into northern Iraq between 25 September and 15 October 1997 against the Kurdistan Workers' Party (PKK), following Operation Hammer earlier the same year.

== Casualties ==
Turkey announced fatalities of a total of 31 personnel of 3 commissioned officers, 24 soldiers, and 4 village guards; the injured at a total of 91 personnel out of 5 commissioned officers, 7 noncommissioned officers, 77 soldiers, and 2 village guards; and the total number of militants neutralized at 902, with 865 being killed and 37 being captured. Clashes between the PKK and Kurdistan Democratic Party (KDP) resulted in 'considerable losses' for the KDP.
