= Timeline of the Kurdistan Workers' Party insurgency (1978–2015) =

This is the timeline of the Turkish-Kurdish conflict. The Kurdish insurgency is an armed conflict between the Republic of Turkey and various Kurdish insurgent groups, which have demanded separation from Turkey to create an independent Kurdistan, or to have autonomy and greater political and cultural rights for Kurds in Turkey. The main rebel group is the Kurdistan Workers' Party or PKK, which was founded on November 27, 1978, and started a full-scale insurgency on August 15, 1984, when it declared a Kurdish uprising. Apart from some extended ceasefires (most recently during the 2013-2015 Kurdish-Turkish peace process), the conflict has continued to the present day.

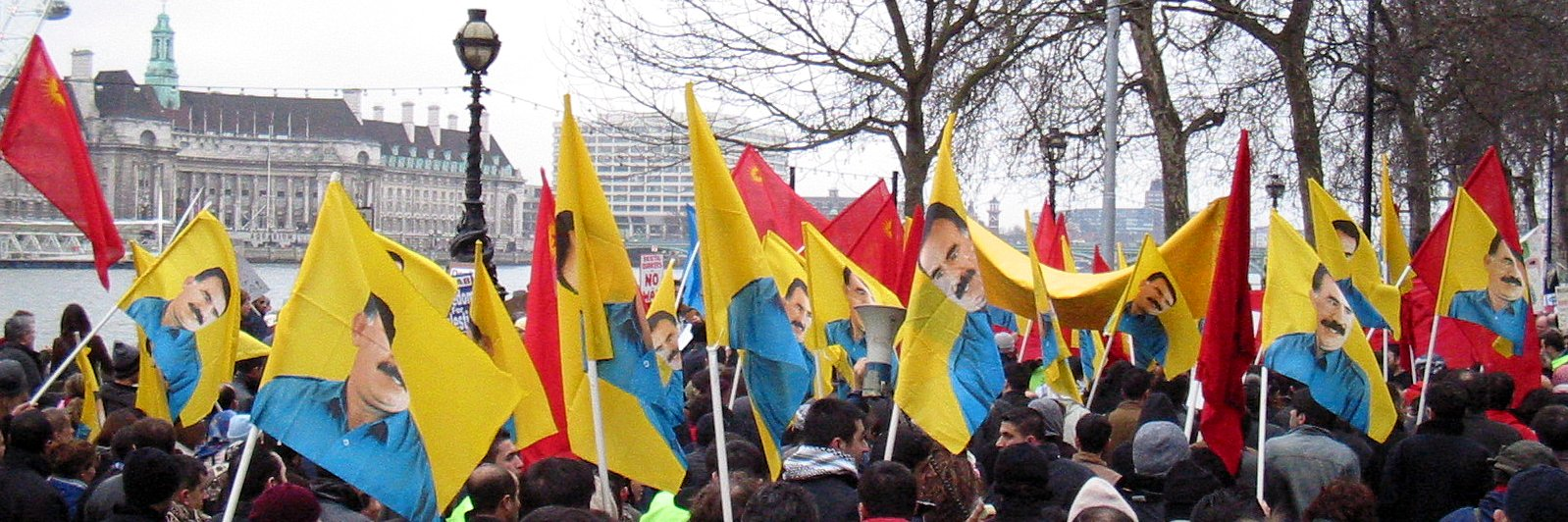
Kurdistan Workers Party supporters in London, April 2003, protesting against the invasion of Iraq

== Background (1920–1974) ==
- July 1920, Koçgiri Rebellion
- August, 1924, Beytüşşebab rebellion
- 1925, Sheik Said Rebellion
- October 1927, Ararat rebellion
- March 20, 1937, Dersim Rebellion

== 1974–1984: Rise of PKK ==
- March 18, 1977, Haki Karer, a leader of the "Revolutionaries of Kurdistan" group is assassinated in Gaziantep.
- May 18, 1978, Halil Çavgun, another "Revolutionaries of Kurdistan" leader is assassinated by Kurdish landowners.
- November 27, 1978, the founding congress of the Kurdistan Workers' Party is held in the village of Fis near Lice in Diyarbakır Province.
- December 25, 1978, Grey Wolves commit Maraş Massacre, killing 109 and injuring 176 Alevi Turks/Kurds in Kahramanmaraş.
- July 30, 1979, assassination attempt to Celal Bucak, a member of parliament, by PKK, then also known as Apoists. 5 killed, Bucak and his 8 (or 11) year old son wounded.
- September 12, 1980, General Kenan Evren seizes power, deposing an elected government led by Süleyman Demirel and his Justice Party in the 1980 Turkish coup d'état. Most of the PKK's leadership move to Syria.
- November 10, 1980, The Turkish Consulate in Strasbourg, France was bombed causing significant material damage but no injuries. In a telephone call to the Agence France-Presse office, a spokesman said the blast was a joint operation and marked the start of a "fruitful collaboration" between the Armenian Secret Army for the Liberation of Armenia (ASALA) and the Kurdistan Workers Party.
- September 24, 1981, the Turkish consulate in Paris is attacked by ASALA. Their demands included the release of five Kurdish revolutionary fighters.
- March 21, 1982, imprisoned PKK leader Mazlum Doğan burned himself to death in protest of the treatment of inmates at the Diyarbakır Prison.
- May 18, 1982, PKK members Ferhat Kurtay, Necmi Önen, Mahmut Zengin and Eşref Anyık also burn themselves to death in Diyarbakır Prison.
- June 6, 1982, start of the First Lebanon War, PKK forces stationed in the Beqaa Valley are ordered to fight alongside the Palestinian Liberation Organisation (PLO) and Syria, against Israel.
- July 14, 1982, PKK members Kemal Pir, M. Hayri Durmuş, Ali Çiçek and Akif Yılmaz start a hunger strike in Diyarbakır Prison.
- August 20–25, 1982, the second PKK congress is held in Daraa, Syria.
- September 7, 1982, Kemal Pir dies as result of his hunger strike in Diyarbakır Prison. M. Hayri Durmuş dies on September 12, Akif Yılmaz on September 15 and Ali Çiçek on September 15.
- April 12, 1984, a 75-day hunger-strike is started by Kurdish prisoners in Istanbul. Four prisoners die as result of the hunger-strike.

== 1984–1999 ==
- August 15, 1984, the PKK starts the armed Kurdish rebellion with an attack on police and gendarmerie bases in Şemdinli, Hakkâri Province and Eruh, Siirt Province.
- March 21, 1986, the PKK's military commander: Mahsum Korkmaz aka "Agit" is killed by Turkish forces.
- July 19, 1987, the Grand National Assembly of Turkey declared a civil state of emergency in 10 Southeastern provinces in response to the PKK's insurgency.

=== 1990 ===
- February 5, 1990, over 500 Iraqi Kurds protested in Diyarbakir and clashed with Turkish security forces. Ninety-five people were arrested.
- March 14, 1990, start of Kurdish popular protests and civil uprising known as Serhildan and in the city of Nusaybin.
- May 27, 1990, about 100 Kurdish political prisoners went on hunger strike.
- June 2, 1990, during a protest by 2,000 Iraqi Kurds, five protesters and a policeman were killed.
- June 8, 1990, ten Kurdish MPs, led by Ahmet Fehmi Işıklar from the Social Democratic Populist Party broke away from the party to form Turkey's first pro-Kurdish party: the People's Labor Party (HEP).
- August 28, 1990, a Kurdish representative to the United Nations Commission on Human Rights accused Turkey of using the Gulf Crisis to forcibly expel thousands of Kurds from their mountain homeland and executing those who refused to leave. The government of Turkey denied the accusation.

=== 1991 ===
- February 1, 1991, the Turkish government eased the ban on the Kurdish language, by lifting the ban on speaking Kurdish and the ban on Kurdish music. However, the use of Kurdish was still forbidden in printed material, public gatherings, demonstrations and education.
- March 2, 1991, during a major riot in Diyarbakir nearly 1000 Kurds fought troops with stones and sticks. Two Kurds and one Turkish soldier were killed.
- April 1991, Yeşilova incident between British Royal Marines protecting Iraqi-Kurdish refugees, and Turkish Armed Forces allegedly preventing the refugees from receiving aid, in a refugee camp in Yeşilova.

=== 1992 ===
- August 18–21, 1992, Battle of Şırnak, between Turkish armed forces and PKK fighters in the town of Şırnak leading to the destruction of much of the town.
- October 3, 1992, start of similar operations in the town of Kulp in Diyarbakır Province.
- October 12, 1992, Turkey launches A cross-border special operation into Northern Iraq with 2,500 commandos against 10,000 PKK militants to rescue 2 captured Turkish soldiers. Turkey killed over 1,550 PKK militants and captured more than 2,600 with just only 14 commandos being killed.
- November 17, 1992, truce signed between the KDP, PUK and PKK.

=== 1993 ===
- March 20, 1993 – PKK unilateral cease-fire declaration. Turkish President Turgut Özal plans pro-Kurdish reform package, but dies in office on 17 April 1993, before he can bring it forward (see Castle Plan and 1993 alleged Turkish military coup).
- May 24, 1993, the PKK kills 33 Turkish soldiers, who were heading to their stations that they were designated to after finishing their training, who had surrendered and were unarmed, and multiple civilians in an attack on the highway between Elazığ and Bingöl.
- July 5, 1993, 100 militants attack the village of Başbağlar, near Erzincan, killing 33 civilians.
- July 1993, the HEP is banned for promoting Kurdish rights by the Constitutional Court of Turkey.

=== 1994 ===
- March 4, 1994 – Leyla Zana, Orhan Doğan and other politicians of the pro Kurdish DEP were dismissed from parliament and arrested.
- May 11, 1994, Kurdish lawyer Murat Bozlak formed the People's Democracy Party (HADEP),
- July 7, 1994 – Akçayurt village burned by the Turkish military.
- August 18, 1994 – Mehmet Gürkan was seen taken away in a helicopter having previously reported to the press that he had been tortured by the Turkish military and told to tell television journalists that the PKK had destroyed his village a month earlier. Since his disappearance he has not been seen again.
- November 1994 – March 1995, Turkish Winter Campaign to cut PKK militants off from their winter supplies. Over 6,000 PKK militants were killed during the operations.

=== 1995 ===
- March 20 – May 4, 1995, Turkish Operation Steel against PKK forces in Northern Iraq to prevent further border station ambushes conducted by the PKK. A force of 35,000 personnel (in which most were there for pulling security, a very small portion took part in the actual fighting) went into Iraqi Kurdistan, assisted by planes, helicopters, tanks and APCs. The operation ended in a Turkish victory as the Zap Camp was captured and destroyed by Turkish forces. 555 PKK members were killed and another were 13 captured.
- April 19, 1995, Turkish Troops and aircraft laid siege to Kurdish PKK rebels in eastern Turkey as Ankara's military offensive in northern Iraq entered a fifth week, in the Alibogazi ravine area in Tunceli province.
- December 1995, the PKK announced a unilateral cease-fire
- December 24, 1995, during the Turkish general election of 1995 the HADEP won 1,171,623 or 4.17% of the votes.

=== 1996 ===
- April 1996, Turkish security forces launched the Operation Hawk which claimed lives of 40 Turkish soldiers and 241 militants and 6 other militants were captured alive.
- August 1996, the PKK ended the cease-fire as the peace initiatives didn't have success.
- 1997, 4 Turkish soldiers are killed in the Sazak assault, a joint operation between the PKK, the DHKP/C and TKP/ML near the city of Reşadiye in Tokat Province.

=== 1997 ===
- May July 12–7, 1997, Turkish forces launch Operation Hammer against the PKK in Iraqi Kurdistan during the Iraqi Kurdish Civil War. More than 2,700 PKK militants were killed and over 400 PKK militants were captured.
- September 25 – October 15, 1997, Turkish Operation Dawn, a second intervention to support the KDP against the PKK in the civil war in Iraqi Kurdistan, killing over 850 PKK militants and capturing 37.

=== 1998 ===
- April 23, 1998, Operation Murat is launched against PKK in the Diyarbakır-Bitlis-Bingöl Triangle. ıt is the largest military operation Turkey has conducted inside of its borders. The operation ended after every single PKK member in the triangle was neutralized.
- October 9, 1998, Abdullah Öcalan is forced to leave Syria and go to Moscow, Russia.

=== 1999 ===
- February 1, 1999, Abdullah Öcalan arrives at Greek island of Corfu and is flown to Nairobi, Kenya on February 2.
- February 15, 1999, Abdullah Öcalan is captured in Nairobi, Kenya and brought to Turkey to stand trial
- February 15 – February 18, February 1999 Kurdish protests break out worldwide against the arrest of Abdullah Öcalan, attacking Greek, Kenyan and Turkish diplomatic missions worldwide.
- March 13, 1999, a petrol bomb was detonated at a crowded shopping center in Istanbul, killing 13 people. The next day two people, including a soldier are injured in Bahçelievler by a bomb placed under a truck. Turkish police suspect the PKK was behind the attacks.
- April 18, 1999, during the general election HADEP won 1,482,196 or 4.75% of the votes. During local elections that same day, the party received 1,094,761 or 3.48% of the votes.
- September 1, 1999, the PKK declares a unilateral 10-year cease-fire. End of the first insurgency.

== 1999–2004: Ceasefire ==
- January 17, 2000, the Kurdish Hezbollah's leader Hüseyin Velioğlu is killed by Turkish forces in Istanbul.
- February 2000, PKK declares formal end to the war.
- April 10, 2002, the PKK abolished itself and formed to form a political organization named KADEK (Kurdistan Freedom and Democracy Congress), claiming the PKK had fulfilled its mission and would now move on as purely political organisation.
- May 13, 2003, members of Turkey's constitutional court decided unanimously to disband HADEP and ban the party.
- November 2003, KADEK and the Kurdish parliament (KNK) were merged into a new organization named KONGRA-GEL.
- January 13, 2004, the PKK and all its organizations were added to the U.S. State Department list of Foreign Terrorist Organizations.
- April 5, 2004, the EU added the PKK to its list of designated terrorist organizations.
- June 1, 2004, after a power struggle between moderates and hardliners in the within the PKK is won by hardliners and Murat Karayılan becomes leader of the PKK, the group declares an end to the September 1999 ceasefire and start of the second insurgency.

== 2004–2012 ==
=== 2005 ===
- July 2, 2005, six people are killed and 15 injured by a train bomb planted by Kurdish guerrillas, on a train travelling between Elâzığ and Tatvan in Bingöl province.
- July 6, 2005, a bombing at a holiday resort in Kuşadası kills at least five people including a British and an Irish citizen.

=== 2006 ===
- February 13, 2006, six people are injured in a bombing of an Istanbul supermarket. The Kurdistan Freedom Hawks (TAK) claim responsibility for the blast and vow more attacks.
- June 25, 2006, a bombing hits a tourist resort near Antalya, killing four and injuring 28 people. The TAK claim responsibility for the attack.
- August 27, 2006, ten British and six Turkish citizens are wounded in a minibus bombing in Marmaris. Five people are injured by two other bombs.
- September 12, 2006, a bombing in Diyarbakir kills ten civilians. The Turkish Revenge Brigade (TİT) claimed responsibility for the attack on their website, threatening to kill ten Kurds for every Turk killed in the conflict.

=== 2007 ===
- May 22, 2007: A suicide bombing hits Ankara, killing eight and wounding over 100. This attack was attributed to the PKK and the Turkish army decided to launch a military action against them.
- May 31, 2007: The Turkish military announces they are prepared to launch an incursion into Iraq and sends extra tanks to border areas. Leader of the Kurdistan Regional Government (KRG) Massoud Barzani warns that Turkish forces could face resistance from the Iraqi Kurdish Peshmerga forces.
- June 2, 2007: American troops and civilians have withdrawn from all of Iraqi Kurdistan. Massoud Barzani again warns the Turkish military that any incursion will be fought against by the Peshmerga. Both Iraqi Prime Minister Nouri al-Maliki and U.S. Defense Secretary Robert Gates call upon Turkey to resolve the situation through diplomatic means.
- June 4, 2007: A PKK grenade attack kills seven soldiers and wounds six at an army base in Tunceli.
- June 5, 2007: There are reports of limited shelling and air strikes by the Turkish army attacking PKK bases in Iraqi Kurdistan.
- June 7, 2007: Several hundred Turkish troops cross into Iraq on a "hot pursuit" raid against Turkish rebels. Turkey declares a three-month martial law in Kurdish areas near the Iraq border and bans civilian flights to the area. It has been confirmed that 3 Turkish soldiers have been killed by a PKK landmine. In a joint press conference with Iraqi President Jalal Talabani, Massoud Barzani stated, "The news of Turkish incursion into Iraqi territories is groundless. But if the Turkish threats continue and Turkish troops try to enter into Iraq, this will be a flagrant violation of Iraq's sovereignty."
- October 7, 2007: Yüksekova incident. 27 Turkish soldiers and 33 PKK militants are killed.
- Oct 17, 2007: Turkish Grand National Assembly approves a government request for their troops to cross the Iraqi border to attack Kurdish rebels. Action was delayed on request by the US government on the condition that "swift steps" were taken to deal with the militants.
- Oct 21, 2007: 12 Turkish troops are killed in a PKK ambush on an army post in the village of Dağlıca, within 10 miles of the Iraqi border. This was part of a series of October 2007 clashes in Hakkâri.
- October 24, 2007: Turkish fighter jets bombed several PKK targets on the Iraqi side of the border.

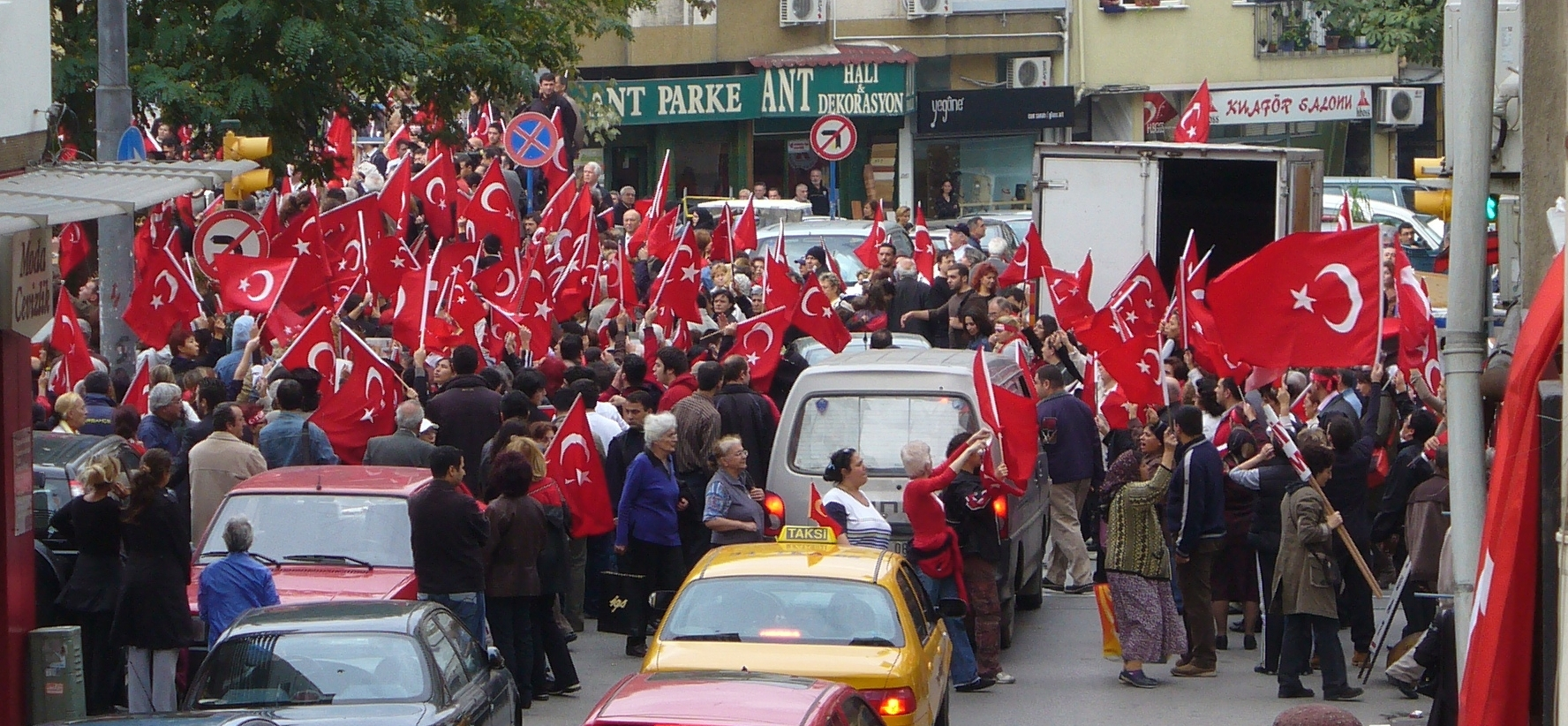
A demonstration against the PKK in Kadıköy, Istanbul on October 22, 2007

=== 2008 ===
- January 3, 2008, a bomb attack against a military vehicle outside a school in Diyarbakır kills five and injures 110 people.
- February 21, 2008: Turkey launches a ground incursion into northern Iraq, sending 10,000 troops across the border supported by air assets.
- May 9, 2008, three people are killed and five wounded in Batman province when a landmine destroys their minibus.
- August 7, 2008: The PKK claimed responsibility for the explosion that halted the operation of the Baku-Tbilisi-Ceyhan oil pipeline.
- October 4, 2008: Fifteen Turkish soldiers were killed, with another 20 also wounded, after a PKK attack from northern Iraq with the firing of heavy weapons at a military outpost in the Semdinli region bordering Iraq and Iran. At least 23 members of the PKK were also killed.

A statement issued after an emergency meeting of the Counter Terrorism Higher Board, chaired by Prime Minister Recep Tayyip Erdogan, said: "Our struggle against terrorism will be pursued under all conditions and above all other concerns through effective cooperation between state bodies and every measure will be implemented with determination."

The British foreign office said: "The United Kingdom utterly condemns Friday's terrorist attack in Hakkâri, Turkey. There can be no excuse for the use of violence to achieve one's aims. The UK stands shoulder-to-shoulder with Turkey in its fight against terrorism and strongly supports ongoing efforts between the Turkish and Iraqi authorities to prevent the PKK from using northern Iraq as a base from which to mount attacks against Turkey."

The European Union also condemned the on the gendarmerie station in a statement released by the Union's French presidency, saying: "Europe expresses its complete solidarity with the Turkish authorities and offers its condolences to the families and friends of the victims."

=== 2009 ===
- April 29, 2009, a PKK detonated bomb kills nine soldiers after ripping through their vehicle in Diyarbakir province.
- May 28, 2009: 6 Turkish soldiers were killed and 7 others were reportedly injured when their vehicle struck a landmine, in the Hakkâri Province of south-eastern Turkey.
- December 7, 2009: Seven Turkish soldiers were killed and three wounded in an ambush in Resadiye, Northern Turkey. The gunmen are suspected Kurdish militants, but their identities have not yet been confirmed.

=== 2010 ===
- April 15, 2010: In the Siirt Province 2 PKK militants were killed and 3 soldiers wounded.
- May 1, 2010: At least 4 Turkish soldiers were killed and another 7 others were apparently injured after PKK militants attacked a military command post within the Tunceli Province, in eastern Turkey.
- May 7, 2010: 2 Turkish soldiers and 5 PKK militants were killed in a clash, after Kurdish militants launched an overnight attack upon a military command post in the Daglica district, in the south-eastern Hakkâri Province. One other soldier was also reportedly injured in this engagement.
- May 8, 2010: 2 Turkish soldiers were killed in two separate explosions, as they patrolled remote areas of both the Hakkâri Province and the Şırnak Province, which are border provinces of the country. Turkish special forces also pursued and killed at least 5 PKK militants, after they followed them into northern Iraq with helicopter gunships and drones. This Turkish incursion reportedly came as 2 other Turkish soldiers were killed by PKK militants, according to a military command website.
- May 21, 2010: At least 4 PKK militants were killed when Turkish military aircraft attacked rebel targets inside northern Iraq. This incident has been proclaimed the largest government operation in more than a year, according to military officials in the country.
- May 26, 2010: 4 PKK militants were killed by Turkish security forces, in a military clash within the mountainous Tunceli Province, in eastern Turkey.
- May 29, 2010: 2 Turkish soldiers and 3 state-backed village guards were killed in two separate clashes with PKK militants within the Şırnak Province, of south eastern Turkey. It has also been reported that 6 other people were wounded in these two clashes.
- May 31, 2010: Iskenderun, Turkey PKK fighters launched a rocket attack against a Turkish naval base in the Mediterranean port city of Iskenderun, in southern Turkey. It was later reported that at least 6 Turkish soldiers were killed in this attack and that another 7 other soldiers were apparently wounded in this rocket assault.
- June 11, 2010: 1 Turkish soldier was killed and 14 other people were wounded after PKK militants launched two attacks against security forces within the Hakkâri Province and the Tunceli Province in the east of the country.
- June 16, 2010: 4 PKK militants were killed by Turkish security forces in an offensive across the border into northern Iraq. The Turkish military have also claimed that air strikes were also launched against rebel positions deeper inside the Iraqi territory.
- June 19, 2010: At least 8 Turkish soldiers were killed and another 14 other soldiers were wounded in a clash with PKK militants at an outpost near the city of Semdinli, in the Hakkâri Province. It has been reported that this particular clash came as PKK militants launched a raid upon a Turkish outpost near to the city of Semdinli. It is known that 12 PKK militants were also killed in these subsequent clashes and that Turkish military aircraft later proceeded to bomb PKK militant positions in the north of Iraq. Two further Turkish soldiers were killed when PKK militants trod on a land mine.
- June 22, 2010: At least 5 people were killed and 12 others were injured after a remote-control bomb exploded near to a military convoy within Turkey's largest city in Istanbul. It was later reported that those killed consisted of 4 Turkish soldiers and 1 civilian, as both military personnel and civilians were present aboard this military bus. Another 12 others were also injured in this bombing, with two of those in a critical condition. This incident was later considered by Turkish authorities to be a terrorist attack and PKK militants are being considered as the most likely of perpetrators. At least 7 PKK militants and 1 Turkish soldier were killed in clashes within different areas and provinces of the country. It was also reported that two soldiers and three civilians had apparently been wounded in these clashes and that one PKK militant had been captured by the Turkish security forces in these operations.
- June 25, 2010: 2 PKK militants were killed by Turkish police after the Turkish security forces attacked their hideout after they had received a tip-off, in the eastern sectors of the country.
- June 28, 2010: Turkish military warplanes bombarded PKK military positions in the Sidakan district of the Arbil province within the mountainous region of north-eastern Iraq. There were no accurate reports on the extent to how much damage or how many casualties were sustained in this renewed bombing campaign.
- July 1, 2010: 2 Turkish soldiers, 3 government-allied militia and 12 PKK militants were killed in clashes near the town of Pervari within the Siirt Province, in south-eastern Turkey.
- July 6, 2010: 3 Turkish soldiers and 13 PKK militants were killed in two separate incidents after Kurdish rebels attacked a Turkish military outpost and yet also attacked a Turkish military patrol, in both the Hakkâri Province and the Elazig Province within south-eastern Turkey. It was also reported that a total of nine Turkish soldiers were apparently injured in these two particular attacks towards the Turkish military within these two different provinces, which are located within the east and the south-eastern sectors of the country.
- July 20, 2010: 6 Turkish soldiers were killed and 15 other soldiers were reportedly injured after PKK militants launched an attack upon a military outpost, near to the town of Cukurca within the Hakkâri Province of south-eastern Turkey. It was also reported that 1 PKK militant was also reportedly killed in this attack upon the military outpost. It was later reported that one Turkish soldier was killed in a separate attack after his military unit was fired upon by PKK militants within the Van Province, of eastern Turkey. This latest attack brings the total number of Turkish soldiers to be killed in PKK militant attacks to seven on this particular day.
- August 5, 2010: 1 Turkish soldier and 6 PKK militants were killed in military clashes between the two forces. In a separate incident, it was reported that 3 PKK militants were killed in the Hakkâri province within the south-east of the country in clashes with the Turkish military. Meanwhile, it is also known that another 3 PKK militants were also apparently killed after they opened fire at a local governor's office within the eastern city of Van. In this clash, it was reported that 2 police officers apparently sustained injuries in this militant attack. It was reported that police also managed to confiscate explosives from a car near to the city of Diyarbakir, in south-eastern Turkey. It is known that 2 suspected PKK militants were reportedly detained by the authorities after this incident.
- August 9, 2010: 5 PKK militants were killed in clashes with the Turkish military within the Batman Province of south-eastern Turkey. It was also reported that 2 Turkish soldiers were also reportedly injured during these military clashes.
- September 7, 2010: 1 Turkish soldier and 9 PKK militants were killed after clashes broke out after militants had raided a hydroelectric power plant within the Dinar Deresi region of the Tunceli province, which is located in eastern Turkey.
- September 16, 2010: At least 9 Kurdish civilians were killed and 3 others were reportedly injured in a minibus blast, which is believed to have been caused by a suspected mine explosion that occurred near to the city of Hakkâri, in south-eastern Turkey. PKK militants are suspected of carrying out this particular bombing.

=== 2011 ===
- March 15, 2011: 3 PKK militants who were noticed during a routine field scanning mission were killed.
- April 2011: In Kahramanmaraş in Turkey's Mediterranean Region, three PKK militants were shot dead by security forces amidst protracted street protests.
- May 2011: 12 PKK militants were killed while they were trying to pass the Turkish-Iraqi border.
- July 14, 2011: Silvan ambush, 13 Turkish soldiers were killed in an ambush by PKK separatists, who used grenades and small arms fire. The PKK also suffered seven militants killed.
- July 24: Three Turkish soldiers are killed in an ambush near Ikipinar, in Mardin province.
- August 17: Nine soldiers and a village guard die in landmine blasts in Hakkâri province.
- August 18: In response to the Hakkâri attack, Turkish F-16s launched attacks on PKK positions in northern Iraq. Turkey claimed to have hit 168 targets in Iraq, including in the Qandil Mountains.
- September 21: PKK killed 4 Kurdish civilian women and wounded 2 others in Siirt by attacking a civilian vehicle.
- October 19: PKK killed 24 Turkish soldiers during overnight attacks on military installations in Hakkâri province. PKK lost 23 militants in the attack, and at least 49 more on the following operations by Turkish army.
- December 28–29: 35 Kurdish civilians (probably smugglers), mostly teenagers, were killed by Turkish airforce jet bombardment on the Turkish-Iraqi Kurdistan border. The Turkish government offered compensation for the families of the killed, who according to Turkish officials were mistakenly killed in airstrike, identifying them as PKK militants. Turkish President Erdogan expressed personal regret over the killing. Turkey's largest pro-Kurdish party at the time, the BDP, called the event a "crime against humanity".

=== 2012 ===
- February 8–9: Turkish clashes with PKK militants kill 14. Among the PKK, 13 were killed, 3 were captured and two wounded; 1 Turkish soldier was killed as well.
- February 11–12: Turkish warplanes performed overnight strikes on suspected PKK targets in northern Iraq. The planes targeted the Zab and Hakurk areas, returning successfully according to Turkish military sources.
- May 25: A suicide attack was made to a police office in Kayseri, killing one police officer.
- June 12: A bomb was exploded in front of a police office in İstinye, Istanbul. Only the perpetrator died.
- July 23: A military operation was commenced in Şemdinli, Hakkari. Operation lasted until August 11, 115 guerillas and 8 soldiers were killed.
- August 9: In Foça, İzmir, a bus exploded in a bombing that killed two soldiers and wounding several civilians.
- August 12: Kurdish MP Hüseyin Aygün was kidnapped in his home town by PKK. He was released two days later.
- August 19: On the first day of the religious fest, 15 guerillas were killed in the province of Hakkari and two soldiers died in a mine explosion.
- August 20: On the evening of the second day of the religious fest, a car full of explosives was exploded in the province of Gaziantep, killing 9 civilians (four of them were children) and wounding 56. With this attack, the number of civilian casualties since 2007 reached 65, including 23 children.
- August 21: In the morning, nine soldiers died in a car accident involving a military vehicle in the Kurdish populated region, Uludere, Şırnak. On the evening, 6 PKK fighters have been killed in Şırnak.
- August 22: A landmine explosion near a military vehicle killed 5 soldiers.
- August 23: Turkish soldiers killed 21 PKK fighters who launched a bomb attack on a military convoy that killed five soldiers.
- September 1: After a week of unofficial ceasefire, PKK attacked a group of soldiers and wounded one. On the evening of the same day, Turkish forces killed an insurgent in a pursuing conflict.
- September 2: 10 soldiers were killed in an outpost raid in Beytüşşebap, Şırnak, leaving 20 insurgents dead in return. With this attack, since June 2011, nearly 800 people have died in the conflict in Turkey, including about 500 PKK fighters, more than 200 security personnel and about 85 civilians, according to estimates by thinktank the International Crisis Group.
- September 7: 30 insurgents were killed and 1 soldier died in a major offensive in Mount Kato, following a suspicious arsenal blast in Afyon which claimed the lives of 25 soldiers.
- September 9: 25 PKK fighters were killed in cross-border bombings in Iraq.
- September 10: 2 Turkish soldiers were killed and 7 others were wounded in an armed conflict in Şemdinli, Hakkari.
- September 12: 2 Turkish soldiers and 25 PKK fighters were killed in an armed conflict in Şemdinli, Hakkari.

== 2013–2015: Peace process ==
=== 2012 ===
- December 28: Prime Minister Recep Tayyip Erdoğan revealed that the National Intelligence Organization (MİT) had been visiting Abdullah Öcalan to find a solution to end the conflict.

=== 2013 ===
- 3 January – Ahmet Türk and BDP deputy Ayla Akat Ata went to İmralı island where they met Abdullah Öcalan.
- 7 January – 14 PKK rebels killed on Iraqi Kurdistan border.
- 9 January – Sakine Cansiz, a founding member of the PKK and the PKK administrators Fidan Doğan, Leyla Söylemez were assassinated in Paris.
- 14 February – The Turkish government has announced that a second delegation of BDP members will be meeting with Öcalan.
- 23 February – BDP deputy parliamentary group chair Pervin Buldan, Istanbul deputy Sırrı Süreyya Önder and Diyarbakır deputy Altan Tan went to Öcalan's prison on İmralı island. The delegation, which was granted special authorization by the Ministry of Justice to hold deliberations with Abdullah Öcalan, heard out the PKK leader's proposed roadmap for the government to put an end to the issue of terrorism in the country. Öcalan also passed on letters to Kandil, the PKK's European administration and to the public via the BDP delegation.
- 11 March – A six-person delegation has left Diyarbakır to meet the eight public workers to be released by PKK in Iraq. The delegation included Sebahat Tuncel, a BDP MP; Öztürk Türkdoğan, the president of Human Rights Association (IHD) and Ahmet Faruk Ünsalt, he Chairman of Mazlumder.
- 13 March – The PKK freed eight Turkish prisoners held for two years in Iraq. The release of the eight captives came after a request by Öcalan.
- 3 April – Turkey has set up a consultative body of "wise people" to help shape public opinion on the peace process with the PKK.
- 8 May – PKK members start withdrawal from Turkey.
- 9 May – The wise people committee gave its first report to Erdoğan and shared their impressions on the level of support regarding the process.
- 6 December – 2 Kurds killed in clashes over PKK cemetery. 1 later died in hospital.

=== 2014 ===
- 16 July – 3 Turkish soldiers and 6 PYD/PKK members killed on Turkish-Syrian border.
- 7–10 October – At least 37 people (including 2 police officers) were killed in the so-called Kobane protests.

=== Early 2015 ===
- 22 March – Abdullah Ocalan wrote a letter to Turkey. His letter states a new era with PKK and Turkey. That means peace with PKK and Turkey and go against ISIL.

== See also ==
- Timeline of the Kurdistan Workers' Party insurgency (2015–2025)
- Turkish occupation of Iraqi Kurdistan
