= Karakilisa =

Karakilisa (Turkish for "black church"; also spelled Gharakilisa) may refer to:

- Ağrı, Turkey (Known as Karakilisa before 1923)
- Azatan, Armenia
- Dökmetaş, Yenişehir, Turkey
- Gharibjanyan, Armenia
- Hartavan, Armenia
- Lernapar, Armenia
- Lerrnhovit, Armenia
- Sisian, Armenia
- Vanadzor, Armenia

== See also ==
- Karakilise
