= Çatak helicopter incident =

Turkish military incident

On 11 September 2020 two Kurdish villagers were arrested in their village near Catak district of Van province and two hours after were hospitalized. Servet Turgut's medical report stated injury to "unspecified fall" and Osman Siban to "fall from a high location/fall from a helicopter". Witnesses stated that they were healthy upon arrest when taken on a helicopter after.

Siban was discharged and his treatment "completed" on 20 September 2020, but the very next day at 5:30am he was taken from his home to a military hospital, ordered by the Chief Public Prosecutor in Van. A planned delegation of HDP’s including Parliamentary Spokesperson, several deputies, executive board and party assembly members to investigate the incident arrived the same day. The police had surrounded members of the delegation which wanted to make a press statement after their visit, but the press were prevented from publishing. Siban aged 50 at the time, suffering from "dizzy spells and memory loss" since being discharged from the military hospital.

A day after arresting Siban, the governors office of Van released a statement stating that one "got wounded by falling off the cliff" (referring to Turgut) and both are "considered to be aiding and abetting the organization members." referring to the PKK.

Turgut since being in a coma died aged 55 on 30 September 2020 due to his injuries.

== Background ==
The incident followed clashes between the Turkish military and the PKK nearby the village resulting in the death of three Turkish soldiers and one (or three) PKK militant(s). After the clashes Turkish soldiers visited the village while Turgut was working in the farm near by, they then gathered the men making them kneel down in the middle of the village. Turkish military officers asked villagers to confirm the identity of Turgut since he had no ID and questioned who Şiban was. Witnesses state that the officers began to shout at the villagers saying “We are in pain. Who will we take it out on, if not you? We are going to burn your village down.” assuming they were referring to the soldiers deaths during the recent clashes.

=== Cover up ===
Human Rights Watch stated "Strong discrepancies between the Van governor’s statement and witness statements raise concerns that the authorities are already engaged in covering up what happened to the men and may prevent an effective, transparent investigation into the incident. The governorship claims both men were apprehended in the same location, though witnesses say that about 15 military officers brought Turgut to the village while Şiban was having tea there with his brother."

=== Arrests ===
A year since the incident there has been no progress in terms of the case, however since then there has been only journalists who reported on the incident to be arrested. Journalist Cemil Uğur's house was raided, and later he was taken to the “counterterrorism branch of the Turkish police” in Van. Amnesty International has written to the Turkish authorities stating allegations must be "promptly be independently and impartially investigated."

=== Related history ===
Similar acts have occurred in the past in which the Turkish military have thrown people out of helicopters in the 90's. One case occurred in May 10, 1994 in which three people accused of being PKK guerrillas were thrown to their deaths flying near Kulp, Diyarbakir province.

== See also ==
- Kurdish villages depopulated by Turkey
- Timeline of the Kurdish–Turkish conflict (1978–present)
