= 2008 Turkish incursion into northern Iraq =

Military operation

Operation Sun
- Part of the Kurdish–Turkish conflict, Iraq War and the Iraqi civil war (2006–2008)
- Location of the Kurdistan Regional Government in northern Iraq
Date	February 21, 2008 – February 29, 2008
Location	Kurdistan Region, Iraq
Result	Both sides claim victory: Turkish military withdraws

Belligerents
Turkey	PKK; PJAK

Commanders and leaders
(Turkey) Yaşar Büyükanıt (Turkey) İlker Başbuğ (Turkey) Aydoğan Babaoğlu (Turkey) Bekir Kalyoncu	Murat Karayilan; Fehman Huseyin; Cemil Bayik; Murat Karasac

Strength
5,000–10,000 troops or several hundred, including 3,000 special forces 14 aircraft	5,000 (estimated)

Casualties and losses
24 killed 100–300+ killed (PKK claim) (Note: Following the Turkish withdrawal, the PKK initially claimed over 100 soldiers were killed In 2017, Şahan Geli, who participated in the Operation claimed that over 300 were killed); 3 village guards killed 1 AH-1 Cobra lost	237 killed, 3 captured "Tens" killed (PKK claim)

The 2008 Turkish incursion into northern Iraq, code-named Operation Sun (Turkish: Güneş Harekatı) by the Turkish Armed Forces, began on February 21, 2008, when the Turkish Army sent troops into northern Iraq to target the Kurdistan Workers' Party (PKK). The ground offensive was preceded by Turkish Air Force bombardments of PKK camps in northern Iraq, which began on December 16, 2007. It was the "first confirmed ground incursion" of Iraq since the 2003 U.S.-led invasion.

Initial reports indicated that up to 10,000 troops had taken part in the operation, although the Kurdistan Regional Government and the Multi-National Force – Iraq claimed only a few hundred troops were involved.

== Background ==
In October 2007, Turkish jets and ground forces clashed with PKK forces in Turkey and over the border into northern Iraq.

== Winter bombing campaign ==
Turkey launched its first cross-border raid on December 16, 2007, involving 50 fighter jets. A Turkish military statement said that up to 175 militants were killed on that day alone, while Iraqi officials reported that the strikes had targeted 10 villages and killed one civilian. The PKK reported seven deaths.

On December 26, the Turkish General Staff said Turkish military aircraft bombed eight PKK bases in northern Iraq in a raid undertaken after "it was determined that a large group of militants, who have been watched for a long time, were preparing to pass the winter in eight caves and hideouts in the Zap region," the statement said.

On January 10, 2008, Turkish warplanes bombed PKK hideouts in northern Iraq, the military announced, but there were no reports of casualties or serious damage.

The Turkish military said in a statement on February 4 that Turkish fighter jets struck nearly 70 PKK targets in northern Iraq in a series of strikes.

The president of Kurdish region of northern Iraq, Massoud Barzani, condemned Turkey's raids and warned Ankara to stop the strikes, and the Iraqi Foreign Minister Hoshyar Zebari, who is a member of the Kurdish Democratic Party (KDP), expressed concern that "unilateral actions" could harm Iraqi and Turkish interests. According to the Turkish General Staff's estimates, there were 300 PKK militants in the region prior to the incursion and the General Staff claims that 240 militants were killed.

== Operation Sun ==
=== Preparation for the ground incursion ===
On February 21, Turkey began targeted artillery and aerial bombardment of PKK positions in northern Iraq in order to "destroy the organizational infrastructure in the region." This lasted from 10:00 to 18:00 local time. The Turkish government reported that on the day of the operation, Turkish President Abdullah Gül made a telephone call to Iraqi President Jalal Talabani, himself a Kurd, to brief him on the details of the incursion. He also invited Talabani to come to Turkey.

Turkish Prime Minister Recep Tayyip Erdogan said he called Iraqi Prime Minister Nouri al-Maliki on the night the ground operation began, and later U.S. President George W. Bush. The United States was guarded in its response to the incursion, requesting that Turkey take care to only target the PKK, to "limit the scope and duration of their operations," and to work with Iraqi and Kurdish officials.

=== Incursion ===
Map of Iraqi Kurdistan

The incursion itself began at 17:00 UTC February 21, 2008. Reports from NTV Turkey indicated that 10,000 troops were involved in the operation, and had advanced 10 km beyond the Turkish border into Iraq, mainly around the Hakurk region. Another report from CNN-Turk said that 3000 special forces were involved.

The incursion was announced on the Turkish General Staff's website the following day, and would constitute the "first confirmed ground incursion" since the 2003 invasion of Iraq.

According to the Iraqi Foreign Minister, Turkish troops had advanced only 5 km into Iraqi territory. 60 tanks were also said to have initially entered Iraq, but by the following day some had returned across the border.

Kurdish-Iraqi peshmerga forces were put on alert and prevented Turkish military monitors in northern Iraq from leaving their camps.

Iraqi officials announced that no Turkish troops had crossed the Iraqi border using the major land route into Iraq, the Khabur Bridge, and there were no reports of Turkish contact from the Kurdistan Regional Government Peshmerga forces. Iraq claimed that Turkey had destroyed five bridges in the area.

On February 24, PKK sources claimed that PKK fighters had shot down a Turkish Cobra helicopter and Turkey confirmed this later in the day, saying that the incident happened "due to an unknown reason." Advancing Turkish troops were attacking the PKKs' shelters, logistic centers and ammunition. According to Turkey, the retreating PKK militants set booby traps under the corpses of dead comrades and planted mines on escape routes in order to gain time.

By February 25, the military had advanced more than 30 km (20 miles) into Iraq and claimed to have destroyed seven militant camps. Heavy fighting raged at the entrance to the Great Zab valley with most of the Turkish troops inside Iraq involved in an attack on a key PKK command centre in the valley after taking control of the PKK's Haftanin camp about 5 km (3 miles) from the border. Fighting was concentrated on a strategic hill controlling the entrance to the valley. At least 21 militants were killed in the battle for the hill according to the Turkish army. The PKK used long-range guns to hold off the military, killing two Turkish soldiers, until silenced with light and heavy weapons fire. PKK losses could not be determined because of bad weather.

In the coming days Turkish warplanes bombed PKK hideouts in the mountainous Siladze area and heavy fighting raged in the area near the PKK camps in Zap and Haftanin, with the guerrillas putting up stiff resistance. On February 27 Turkey sent additional troops to Iraq in the face of ongoing pressure from the international community for a speedy withdrawal.

On February 28 a senior Turkish official said Turkish security forces were planning to pull back their troops in a few days to an uninhabited cordon sanitaire on the southern side of the border. Pressure on Turkey to withdraw, however, continued to mount.

The Turkish Army withdrew from Iraq on February 29, declaring that their goals had been achieved and the operation concluded, while also denying that the withdrawal had been prompted by pressure from the United States.

== Casualties and losses ==
After Turkey withdrew from Iraq, it reported having completed their mission and having killed more than two-hundred PKK militants while also admitted the loss of twenty-seven Turkish soldiers. On the other side the PKK reported the death of over a hundred dead Turkish soldiers and only having lost five militants. Prior to the ground operation, Turkey estimated that an additional 300 PKK militants had been killed by Turkish air strikes which began on December 16, 2007 and continued until the beginning of the ground offensive on February 21, 2008. The number of dead militants denied by the PKK, who claimed they had evacuated the areas before the bombardments.

== Post-conflict operations ==
Turkey continued sporadic long-range attacks in the weeks following the operation. In the week of March 24, 2008, Turkey's military announced that it had killed at least 15 rebels in northern Iraq after firing on them with long-range weapons. A spokesman for the Iraqi Kurdish Regional Security Forces, however, denied the report, saying Turkey has not conducted any military operation or air assault there in the previous two weeks.

On April 25 and 26, 2008, the Turkish Air Force bombed the PKK bases in the northern Iraqi regions of Zap, Avasin-Basyan and Hakurk. This was described as the largest attack since the end of Operation Sun. First the T-155 Fırtına howitzers were used to shell the PKK positions starting from 18:00 pm on April 25, which lasted for two hours. Then F-16 jets equipped with LANTIRN belonging to the 181st Squadron (Pars Filo) and F-4E 2020 Terminator jets belonging to the 171st Squadron (Korsan Filo) began bombing the PKK's positions in northern Iraq, which lasted 45 minutes. In the meantime, Heron MALE UAVs were used for gaining reconnaissance data regarding the PKK's positions, and about 1000 Turkish commandos entered 8 kilometers into northern Iraq from the border area near Derecik (Şemdinli) in pursuit of the PKK militants. On April 26, 2008, at around 06:00 am, a second aerial strike by the jets of the Turkish Air Force from Diyarbakır Air Base took place, in which the PKK militants using the cemetery area in Hakurk as a hideout were bombed. This was followed by another air strike at 10:00 am in the same morning, during which the Turkish Air Force jets entered 30 kilometers into Iraqi air space.

On May 1, 2008, at least 30 jets of the Turkish Air Force bombed the PKK camps in northern Iraq. The operation began just before midnight and continued into Friday, May 2, 2008. According to Turkish military sources, the PKK targets that were bombed are far from civilian settlements, at the mountains of the Qandil (Kandil) area. On May 3, the Turkish General Staff announced that "more than 150 PKK militants have been neutralized in the latest operation, which targeted the camps in the Qandil Mountains, where most of the high-ranking members of the organization are located." The Turkish General Staff, without giving a precise name, implied that the PKK rebels who were neutralized may also include "a guerilla who leads the organization" as well; leading the Turkish press to speculate that Murat Karayilan might have also been killed during the latest aerial strikes.

== Reaction ==
=== International organizations ===
- European Union – Foreign policy advisor Javier Solana spoke at a news conference in Slovenia, saying, "We understand the concerns of Turkey...but we think this action is not the best response. The territorial integrity of Iraq is for us very important." The European Commission said through a spokeswoman that "The European Union understands Turkey's need to protect its population from terrorism and it also says that Turkey should refrain from taking any disproportionate military action and respect human rights and the rule of law."
- United Nations – Secretary General Ban Ki-moon released a statement asking for "utmost restraint" and respect of international borders on the part of Turkey and the immediate end of "incursions by PKK elements" into Turkey.

=== National governments ===
- Australia – Foreign Affairs Minister Stephen Smith called on Turkey to respect Iraq's sovereignty and withdraw as soon as possible.
- Germany – The Foreign Office urged Turkey not to escalate regional tensions.
- Iraq – The Iraqi government protested to the Turkish chargé d'affaires in Baghdad. An Iraqi government spokesman said, "Our position is Turkey should respect the sovereignty of Iraq and avoid any military action which would threaten security and stability." On February 26 Iraq increased its criticism, saying the "unilateral military action was unacceptable and it threatened the good relations between the two neighbouring countries."
- Russia - The Russian Foreign Ministry expressed the hope that a political solution respecting Iraqi sovereignty and regional security could be found, though it also acknowledged the importance of not allowing "the territory of any state to be used as a staging ground for terrorist activities against their neighbours."
- United Kingdom – The Foreign Office stated, "We would urge Turkey to withdraw from Iraqi territory as early as possible and take the greatest possible care to avoid causing harm to the civilian population." On February 23 Turkish Foreign Minister Ali Babacan called British Foreign Minister David Miliband to update him on the operation's progress and exchange views.
- United States – In the months leading up to the incursion the US had repeatedly expressed concerns that large-scale military action in Northern Iraq had the potential to destabilize the region, although it supported Turkey's right to defend itself against insurgents. It was seen as a "bitter defeat for American diplomacy" when Turkey launched the operation in defiance of this lobbying effort, and although the US publicly expressed its belief that Turkey had the right to defend itself against insurgents they maintained consistent pressure on Turkey to limit the length and scale of the operation throughout. On February 24, for example, U.S. Defense Secretary Robert Gates said "I would hope that it would be short, that it would be precise and avoid the loss of innocent life and that they leave as quickly as they can accomplish the mission."

=== Regional governments ===
- (Kurdistan Region) The Kurdistan Regional Government condemned the Turkish operation and called for an immediate withdrawal of troops. The KRG suggested immediate four-way talks between Turkey, the U.S., the Iraqi government, and the Kurdish regional government in Northern Iraq. President of the regional government, Massoud Barzani, though stating the Kurdish government refuses to be part of the Turkish-PKK conflict, warned Turkey about inflicting civilian casualties saying, "if the Turkish military targets any Kurdish civilian citizens or any civilian structures then we will order a large-scale resistance", and, "if the clashes harmed any of the Kurdish citizens or further reached Kurdish inhabited areas, Kurds are instructed and prepared to counter attack". On February 28 the Kurdish prime minister Nechirvan Barzani said that he is unsure about whether the Turkish offensive is aimed at the Kurdistan region of Iraq or at PKK.

== See also ==
- Operation Northern Iraq (1992)
- Operation Hammer (1997)
- Kurdish–Turkish conflict
- October 2007 clashes in Hakkari
- August 2011 Turkey-Iraq cross-border raid
- Human rights of Kurdish people in Turkey
