= Ekinciler =

Ekinciler can refer to:

- Ekinciler, Göynük
- Ekinciler, Yenişehir
