= Karakilise =

Karakilise (Turkish for "black church") may refer to:

- Ağrı, Turkey (Known as Karakilise before 1923)
- Dökmetaş, Yenişehir, Turkey
- Karakilise, Şemdinli, Turkey
- Sisian, Armenia
- St. Thaddeus Monastery, Iran

== See also ==
- Karakilisa (disambiguation)
