= Yaytaş, Yenişehir =

Village in Turkey

Yaytaş
- Neighbourhood
- Location in Turkey
- Coordinates: 38°05′N 40°07′E
- Country: Turkey
- Province: Diyarbakır
- District: Yenişehir
- Population (2022): 1,069
- Time zone: UTC+3 (TRT)

Yaytaş is a neighbourhood in the municipality and district of Yenişehir, Diyarbakır Province in Turkey. Its population is 1,069 (2022).
