= 2011 Hakkâri attack =

Attack on armed forces in Turkey

2011 Hakkâri attacks
- Part of Kurdish-Turkish conflict
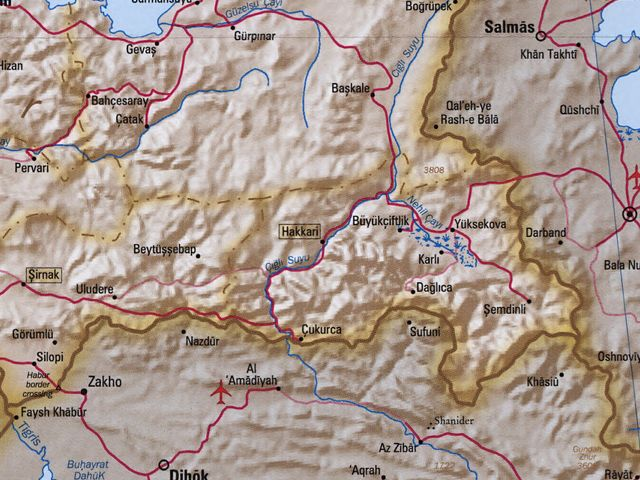
- Map of Hakkâri
Date	19 October 2011 PKK attack (20–25 October TSK operation)
Location	Çukurca, Yüksekova and Hakkâri in Hakkâri Province, Turkey
Status	Inconclusive

Belligerents
Turkey	Kurdistan Workers' Party (PKK)

Commanders and leaders
(Turkey) Necdet Özel (Turkey) Hayri Kıvrıkoğlu (Turkey) Muharrem Metin Özbek	Bahoz Erdal (Turkish claim)

Strength
10,000 soldiers during the operations	100 during the attacks Unknown amount during the TAF operations

Casualties and losses
24 killed, 18 wounded during the attacks 2 killed during the TAF operations	23 killed during the attacks 250–270 killed 210 wounded during the TAF operations

The October 2011 Çukurca attacks are the PKK's attacks targeting Turkish Armed Forces units in Hakkâri's Çukurca district on October 19, 2011. After midnight, 200 PKK members opened fire on police and gendarmerie buildings and security points in the district center with heavy weapons, resulting in 24 Turkish soldiers killed and 18 wounded. Between 21 and 23 PKK militants were killed in the conflict, and around 250-270 PKK militants were killed in the post-conflict operations, and 210 were injured.

== Places PKK attacked ==
Within the scope of the attack, the PKK targeted the following units.

Çukurca District Gendarmerie Command
Çukurca Gendarmerie Public Security Commando Company Command
Çukurca Public Order Tepe Base Area
Cukurca Sivritepe Base Area
TOKİ Police Housing
Gazitepe Gendarmerie Border Command
Keklikkaya (Çukurca) border point
Bankardi Border Point
Bayraktepe Base Area (Çukurca-North)

== Clashes ==
At around 01:00 at night, the PKK group, which is estimated to have 100 people, sent a unit to Çukurca District Gendarmerie Command, Asayiş Hill, where the Police unit is stationed, police and gendarmerie lodgings, the Bankardi border point, the 2nd Mechanized Infantry Brigade in Lice, and a co-head to Sivritepe. armed attacks began. Thereupon, the Sikorsky general purpose helicopters of the Turkish Armed Forces based in Hakkâri took off for the airlift operation. Unmanned aerial vehicle support was ordered, but UAV support could not be provided due to unfavorable weather conditions. The UAV was able to transmit images from Çukurca, however, as of 15.26. At 01:48, with the fire support of two Cobras, two Sikorsky Helicopters brought Combat Search and Rescue and Police Special Operations teams to the conflict area. At 03.07, while the helicopters were leaving due to low fuel, two other helicopter branches came to the area. The firing on PKK militants continued until 04.55.

The main target in the simultaneous attack on Çukurca center and the troops on the border was Kekliktepe, located 15 kilometers from the district center. In the attack, in which other military units in the district were prevented from helping Kekliktepe, 17 soldiers from the unit that went to Kekliktepe from Diyarbakır for logistics purposes, 5 soldiers in the Sivritepe base area and 2 soldiers in Asayiştepe lost their lives.

Meanwhile, as of 03.28, several F-16 and F-4 warplanes started tracking and attacking movements. From 02.10 to 11.30, 24 soldiers from the Turkish Armed Forces who died and 18 wounded were taken to different hospitals. Following 12.50 hours, the PKK militants began to follow and operate. As a result of these operations, many weapons thought to belong to the PKK were seized. While these operations continued, some injured soldiers were transferred to GATA. The Chief of the General Staff, General Necdet Özel, the Land and Air Forces Commanders and the Gendarmerie General Commander went to the region.

According to the statement made by the General Staff, a total of three PKK militants, two in the Keklikkaya base area and one in Asayiştepe, during the search and scanning activities in the region; one Kalashnikov infantry rifle, eighteen unexploded RPG-7 rocket launchers, fifteen hand grenades, twelve full magazines, eight walkie-talkies, three assault vests, and the PKK's casualties, according to radio conversations, reported to be more.

== Operation ==
On 20 October 2011, the Turkish Army, with its 22 battalions, started a comprehensive operation in the border region and Northern Iraq. Special units also participated in this operation and air support was provided. As part of the operation, in which approximately 10,000 soldiers participated, many warplanes took off from Batman and Diyarbakır to Northern Iraq. In the statement made by the General Staff on October 21, 2011, it was announced that most of the operation was carried out within the borders of Turkey and especially around Çukurca. Various statements were published on the PKK's websites on these operations. Mortars and howitzers were fired at the whole of Zagros on 20 October, and that the Turkish Armed Forces opened intense mortar and artillery fire on the Hakurk camp on 21 and 22 October; He reported that airstrikes were carried out in Zagros, Avaşin, Zab and Govende regions with the support of unmanned aerial vehicles.

27-year-old Gendarmerie Master Sergeant Mehmet Ulusoy, who took part in the operation started, died as a result of a mine explosion on 20 October 2011. One soldier was killed and three other soldiers were wounded in the clash between the Turkish Armed Forces forces and PKK members, which carried out an operation in the Pervari district of Siirt as part of the internal security operation. Wounded soldiers were treated in a military hospital. Thereupon, it was reported that AH-1 Cobra helicopters from Siirt 3rd Commando Brigade (Turkey) were removed and the operation continued by expanding.

On October 22, 2011; As a result of the intelligence obtained from the Peshmerga, it was announced that the units affiliated to the Special Forces Command carried out point operations and the use of personnel with special training and equipment (Maroon berets) was emphasized in these operations. It was interpreted that the PKK's crossing routes in the field were kept by special units, and PKK members' conversations over the radio were interpreted as "trapped". At noon, while the units of the Turkish Armed Forces were carrying out body search and scanning activities in the Belat Valley, tanks were sent to the region.

While the operations were continuing on October 23, 2011, a Turkish soldier was killed and six others were injured as a result of firing during the corpse collection effort. In the clash that ensued, four PKK members were killed. A short time later, two more Turkish soldiers died due to a mine explosion.

In an interview on October 24, 2011, Chief of General Staff Gen. Necdet Özel stated that 250-270 PKK militants were killed and 210 were wounded in the operations launched on October 20, 2011, and stressed that the numbers stated in other political, diplomatic and intelligence sources are much higher than these. On the same day, it was announced by the Reuters news agency that tanks and armored vehicles belonging to the Turkish Armed Forces crossed the Iraqi border and headed for the Haftanin Camp.

== Developments ==
After the attack, warplanes took off from the 8th Main Jet Base of Diyarbakır 2nd Air Force Command; It bombed the Qandil, Zap, Hinere, Hakurk and Metina regions. The escape routes of the PKK group were brought under artillery fire. After the attack, a land operation was launched by the Gendarmerie Special Operations which neutralized the PKK members who fled to Northern Iraq.

With the approval of the regional Kurdish administration in Northern Iraq, the evacuation of many villages and towns began. As a result of these studies carried out in line with Turkey's wishes, it has been reported that logistical support to the PKK and PJAK will be cut, and Peshmerga camps will be established and action will be taken against the PKK and PJAK. It was also announced that these works will cost approximately 42 million dollars.

It was reported that in the evening hours of the day of the attack, the general assembly of the parliament to be held the next day will convene to discuss terrorism and the session will be held in a closed manner. In the closed session held in the Grand National Assembly of Turkey on October 20, 2011, a fight broke out among the deputies. The general meeting on terrorism will be held on Wednesday, October 26, 2011 at 14.00.

The day after the attack, on October 20, 2011, the bodies of the killed Turkish soldiers were sent to their hometowns by helicopters from the Van Gendarmerie Public Security Corps Command after autopsies were performed in Van. On the same day, specially trained commandos from Hakkari Mountain Commando Brigade and Border Gendarmerie Brigade in Çukurca were landed in Kavusak, Işıklı and Kazan Valley regions, which were detected by Heron unmanned aerial vehicles. Two AH-1 Cobra helicopters bombarded the area along the Zap Valley. Kemal Kılıçdaroğlu, Chairman of the Republican People's Party; Group Deputy Chairman Muharrem İnce and Akif Hamzaçebi, Deputy Chairman Gürsel Tekin and Ankara Deputy Sinan Aygün visited the wounded soldiers in GATA and got information about their situation. In his statement after the visit, Akif Hamzaçebi stated that they received information that an unconscious injured NCO was in danger of life, that there were four wounded in GATA and four of them had surgery. It was stated that the other injured were in Hakkâri and regional hospitals.

HPG, the military wing of the PKK, made the following statement regarding the attacks: "The destruction operation against the Medya Defense Zones, which was started with the visit of the President of the Republic of Turkey Abdullah Gül to Hakkâri, was repelled by our guerrillas in the spirit of the Revolutionary People's War and with great resistance. Turkey Our revolutionary operation, which was carried out in an environment created by the political genocide attacks launched against our people under the name of KCK arrests in Turkey, prevented the cross-border operation attempt of the Turkish army and state. The responsible of these conflicts and losses was Tansu, who put on the army's camouflage clothes and massacred the Kurdish people instead of coming to Hakkâri and meeting with the people. It is Abdullah Gül who is following in the footsteps of Çiller."

Making a statement on October 21, 2011, Interior Minister İdris Naim Şahin stated that the operation was aimed at ending terrorism and emphasized that there were intelligence agreements with the US for point shooting. Reminding that the villages in Qandil were evacuated, the minister said that they wanted this matter to be resolved without using the state of emergency proposed by the Nationalist Movement Party; however, he stated that he can also apply if necessary.

Soldiers participating in the conflict; It was claimed that the guards left their positions and told that they could not reach them by radio or telephone.

Upon the request of President Abdullah Gül, a briefing was given to him at the Presidential Palace by the Chief of General Staff Operations Lieutenant General Abdullah Recep and the Chief of Operations of the Land Forces, Major General Haluk Cumali Çetinkaya.

On October 22, 2011, Chief of General Staff Necdet Özel published a statement on the website of the General Staff; He conveyed his gratitude for the condolence messages sent and his respect and gratitude on behalf of the TAF members for the support shown.

Making a statement regarding the operations, Deputy Prime Minister Bülent Arınç stated that it is the duty of the government to eradicate and eradicate terrorism, and said that the military made every effort to strike the final blow by using the authority it received at points in the country and abroad. Arınç, who attended the opening of a store in Bursa, said: "After this operation, our soldiers, policemen, all our security forces took action to strangle the bandit in his lair. All the force commanders, especially our Chief of General Staff, and all the teams at the head of the police are now both in Turkey and abroad. and they are engaged in a great activity outside of our lands. Our chief of staff and commanders almost promised to return to Ankara and not to enter their homes before they finish this job. By Allah's permission, may this job turn into relief as soon as possible, may our country, this beautiful homeland, rest in peace and security as soon as possible. That is all we wish for." According to the statement made by the US White House spokesperson, US Prime Minister Barack Obama met with Prime Minister Recep Tayyip Erdoğan on the phone after the attack, "experts" to discuss the US support in the fight against the PKK. He stated that he would send a "delegation".

In addition to the operations in the field, the activities against the PKK continued in the city centers. Thirteen of the 22 people who were detained during the operations against the PKK's senior management in Mardin and who were referred to the court were arrested. In the Çukurca district of Hakkâri Province, raids were carried out by the Police Special Operations at the addresses determined with the permission given by the prosecutor's office.

On October 24, 2011, it was alleged that Fehman Hüseyin, codenamed Bahoz Erdal, a Kurdish-Syrian national, who planned the attacks, had been on Turkish territory for some time. It was alleged that the PKK sent an envoy to the Iraqi Kurdistan Regional Government President Masud Barzani, who sided with Turkey, and requested to "support Turkey". It was stated that serious clashes still take place in the regions where the operations took place.
