= Dokuzçeltik, Yenişehir =

Village in Turkey

Dokuzçeltik
- Neighbourhood
- Location in Turkey
- Coordinates: 37°58′33″N 40°11′21″E
- Country: Turkey
- Province: Diyarbakır
- District: Yenişehir
- Population (2022): 2,261
- Time zone: UTC+3 (TRT)

Dokuzçeltik (Kurdish: Şeyhkent) (Note: Also known as Chehkend.) is a neighbourhood in the municipality and district of Yenişehir, Diyarbakır Province in Turkey. It is populated by Kurds of the Bekiran tribe and had a population of 2,261 in 2022.

== History ==
Şeyhkent (today called Dokuzçeltik) was historically inhabited by Syriac Orthodox Christians. In 1914, the village was populated by 150 Syriacs, according to the list presented to the Paris Peace Conference by the Assyro-Chaldean delegation.

== Bibliography ==
- Bekiran, Mehmet Fatih (2018). Bekiran Aşireti Tarihi (in Turkish). Berikan Yayınları.
- Gaunt, David (2006). Massacres, Resistance, Protectors: Muslim-Christian Relations in Eastern Anatolia during World War I. Gorgias Press.
- Jongerden, Joost; Verheij, Jelle, eds. (2012). Social Relations in Ottoman Diyarbekir, 1870-1915. Brill.
