= Al, Yenişehir =

Village in Turkey

Al
- Neighbourhood
- Location in Turkey
- Coordinates: 38°04′19″N 40°02′46″E
- Country: Turkey
- Province: Diyarbakır
- District: Yenişehir
- Population (2025): 1,147
- Time zone: UTC+3 (TRT)

Al is a neighbourhood in the municipality and district of Yenişehir, Diyarbakır Province in Turkey. It is populated by Kurds and had a population of 1,147 in 2025.
