= Dikentepe, Yenişehir =

Village in Turkey

Dikentepe
- Neighbourhood
- Location in Turkey
- Coordinates: 38°06′53″N 39°57′42″E
- Country: Turkey
- Province: Diyarbakır
- District: Yenişehir
- Population (2025): 133
- Time zone: UTC+3 (TRT)

Dikentepe (Kurdish: Tilxarman) is a neighbourhood in the municipality and district of Yenişehir, Diyarbakır Province in Turkey. It is populated by Kurds and had a population of 133 in 2025.
