= Çakmak, Yenişehir =

Village in Turkey

Çakmak
- Neighbourhood
- Location in Turkey
- Coordinates: 38°09′18″N 39°57′14″E
- Country: Turkey
- Province: Diyarbakır
- District: Yenişehir
- Population (2025): 1,322
- Time zone: UTC+3 (TRT)

Çakmak (Kurdish: Cimikan) is a neighbourhood in the municipality and district of Yenişehir, Diyarbakır Province in Turkey. It is populated by Kurds and had a population of 1,322 in 2025.

== Sources ==
- Tîgrîs, Amed; Çakar, Yıldız (2012). Amed : erdnîgarî, dîrok, çand (in Kurdish).
