= Yenişehir, Diyarbakır =

Yenişehir
- District and municipality
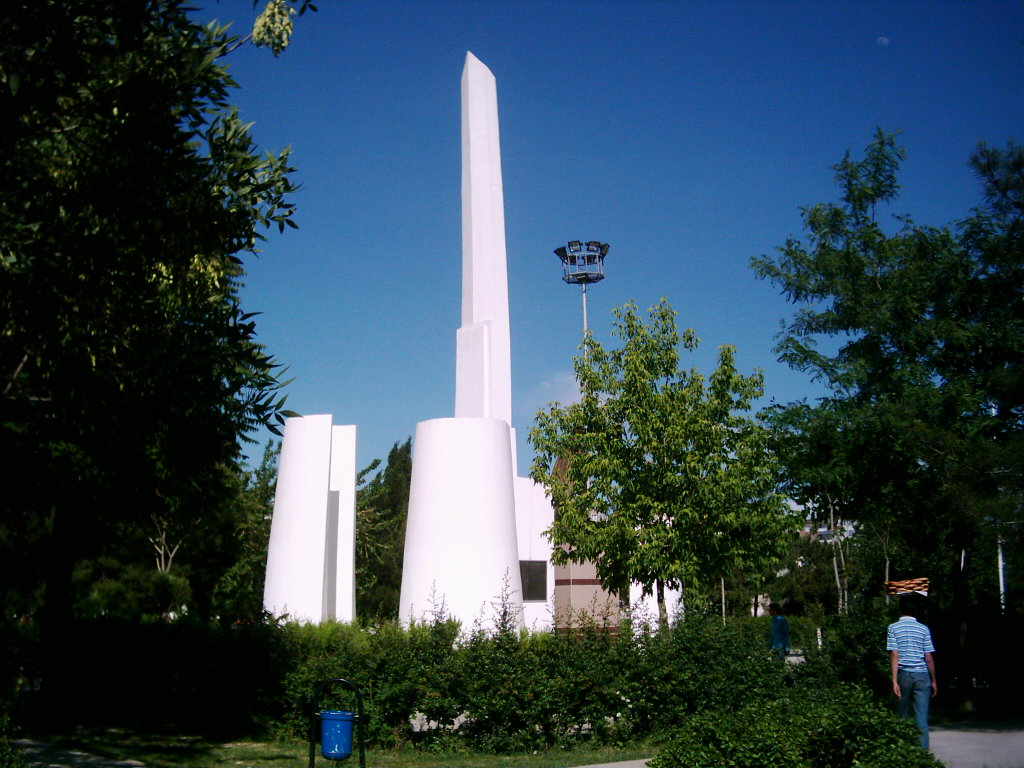

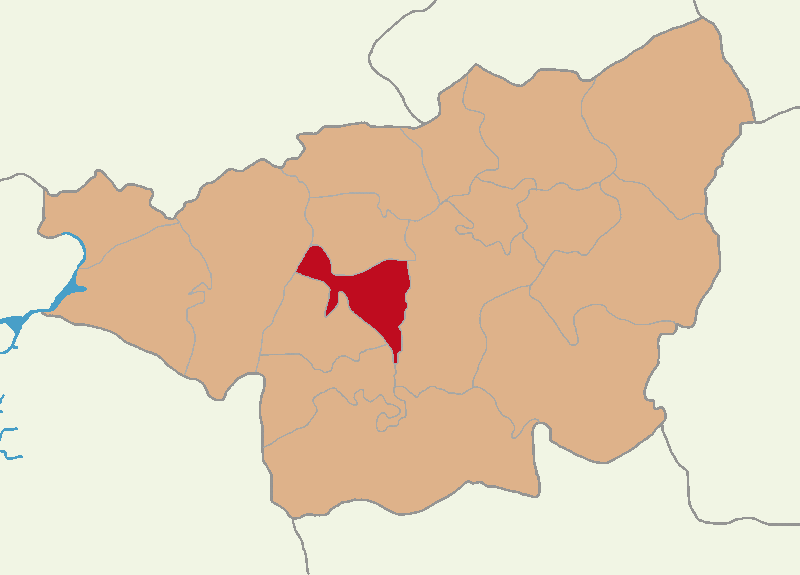
- Map showing Yenişehir District in Diyarbakır Province

- Location within Turkey
- Coordinates: 37°56′N 40°14′E
- Country: Turkey
- Province: Diyarbakır
- Area: 358 km^{2} (138 sq mi)
- Population (2022): 219,759
  - Density: 614/km^{2} (1,590/sq mi)
- Time zone: UTC+3 (TRT)
- Postal code: 21100
- Area code: 0412
- Website: www.yenisehir.bel.tr

Yenişehir (Turkish pronunciation: ['jeniʃehiɾ]) is a municipality and district of Diyarbakır Province, Turkey. Its area is 358 km^{2}, and its population is 219,759 (2022). It covers the southwestern part of the city of Diyarbakır and the adjacent countryside. The district Yenişehir was created in 2008 from part of the central district (Merkez) of Diyarbakır.

== Composition ==
There are 42 neighbourhoods in Yenişehir District:

- Al
- Alangör
- Alpu
- Aziziye
- Bahçelievler
- Başil
- Bozek
- Çakmak
- Çelikevler
- Çimenler
- Cumhuriyet
- Dicle
- Dikentepe
- Dökmetaş
- Dokuzçeltik
- Dönümlü
- Ekinciler
- Elidolu
- Eser
- Fabrika
- Feritköşkü
- Geyiktepe
- Gürdoğan
- Güvendere
- Güvercinlik
- Güzelköy
- Hantepe
- İlbaş
- Kesikağaç
- Kooperatifler
- Sanayi
- Sancar
- Sarıyatak
- Şehitlik
- Sivritepe
- Tanışık
- Üçkuyu
- Yaytaş
- Yenişehir
- Yolaltı
- Yukarınasırlar
- Yüksek
