= Sarıyatak, Yenişehir =

Village in Turkey

Sarıyatak
- Neighbourhood
- Location in Turkey
- Coordinates: 38°2′45″N 40°1′35″E
- Country: Turkey
- Province: Diyarbakır
- District: Yenişehir
- Population (2022): 47
- Time zone: UTC+3 (TRT)

Sarıyatak is a neighbourhood in the municipality and district of Yenişehir, Diyarbakır Province in Turkey. It is populated by Kurds of the Îzol tribe and had a population of 47 in 2022.
