= August 1992 Şırnak Clashes =

1992 clashes in Şırnak, Turkey

- Part of Kurdish–Turkish conflict
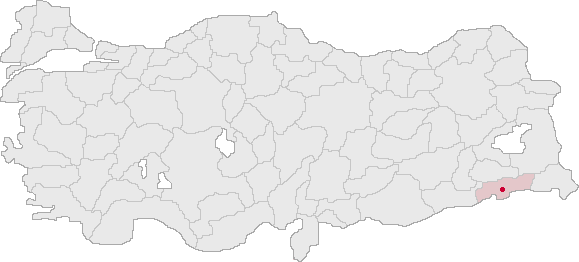
- Location of Şırnak city and province in Turkey
Date	18–21 August 1992
Location	Şırnak, Turkey 37.5164°N 42.4611°E
Result	Town of Şırnak heavily damaged

Belligerents
PKK	Turkey: Şırnak-District Gendarmerie Battalion Command

Strength
Unknown	Unknown

Casualties and losses
85 killed 253 captured	40 killed (Turkish claim); 134 killed (PKK claim)
- 22 civilians killed

August 1992 Şırnak Clashes were a series of clashes that broke out in the city of Şırnak between Kurdistan Workers' Party (PKK) and Turkish security forces from 18 to 21 August 1992, after PKK members had built barricades and attacked the District Gendarmerie Command's building with rockets and mortars. During this battle over 20,000 of Şırnak's 25,000 inhabitants fled the town due to the violence. A total of 107 people were killed, including 85 rebels and 22 civilians.

The clashes started when a large force of PKK rebels attacked government buildings in Şırnak on the night of 18 August, and security forces responded by shelling and firing on rebel positions. Following the battle, a curfew was imposed in the town.

Similar operations were later launched in the towns of Kulp in Diyarbakır Province on 3 October 1992, and Varto in Muş Province on 17 September 1996.

== See also ==
- October 2007 clashes in Şırnak
- Siege of Varto
- 2015-16 Şırnak clashes

== Sources ==
- Sertaç Doğan, Şırnak Yanıyor 1992, Do Yayınları, 2008, ISBN 978-9944-1-0841-6
