= Geyiktepe, Yenişehir =

Village in Turkey

Geyiktepe
- Neighbourhood
- Location in Turkey
- Coordinates: 38°06′N 40°02′E
- Country: Turkey
- Province: Diyarbakır
- District: Yenişehir
- Population (2025): 111
- Time zone: UTC+3 (TRT)

Geyiktepe (Kurdish: Asbeka) is a neighbourhood in the municipality and district of Yenişehir, Diyarbakır Province in Turkey. It is populated by Kurds and had a population of 111 in 2025.
