= Güzelköy, Yenişehir =

Village in Turkey

Güzelköy
- Neighbourhood
- Location in Turkey
- Coordinates: 38°1′24″N 40°13′39″E
- Country: Turkey
- Province: Diyarbakır
- District: Yenişehir
- Population (2025): 909
- Time zone: UTC+3 (TRT)

Güzelköy (Kurdish: Farê) is a neighbourhood in the municipality and district of Yenişehir, Diyarbakır Province in Turkey. It is populated by Kurds and had a population of 909 in 2025.
