= Bozek, Yenişehir =

Village in Turkey

Bozek
- Neighbourhood
- Location in Turkey
- Coordinates: 38°04′44″N 40°03′58″E
- Country: Turkey
- Province: Diyarbakır
- District: Yenişehir
- Population (2022): 592
- Time zone: UTC+3 (TRT)

Bozek is a neighbourhood in the municipality and district of Yenişehir, Diyarbakır Province in Turkey. It is populated by Kurds and had a population of 607 in 2025.
