= Alangör, Yenişehir =

Village in Turkey

Alangör
- Neighbourhood
- Location within Turkey
- Coordinates: 38.0960°N 39.9928°E
- Country: Turkey
- Province: Diyarbakır
- District: Yenişehir
- Population (2022): 720
- Time zone: UTC+3 (TRT)

Alangör is a neighbourhood in the municipality and district of Yenişehir, Diyarbakır Province in Turkey. Its population is 720 (2022).

== History ==
Alangör was formerly a village. It became a neighbourhood following a 2012 amendment to Turkey's administrative law.

== Population ==
Population by year
2019	720
2018	716
2017	688
2016	674
2015	672
2014	668
2013	659
2012	656
2011	634
2010	634
2009	650
2008	640
