= Hantepe, Yenişehir =

Village in Turkey

Hantepe
- Neighbourhood
- Location in Turkey
- Coordinates: 38°06′N 40°10′E
- Country: Turkey
- Province: Diyarbakır
- District: Yenişehir
- Population (2025): 1,492
- Time zone: UTC+3 (TRT)

Hantepe (Kurdish: Tilham) is a neighbourhood in the municipality and district of Yenişehir, Diyarbakır Province in Turkey. It is populated by Kurds and had a population of 14,92 in 2025.
