= Hartavan =

Hartavan Հարթավան
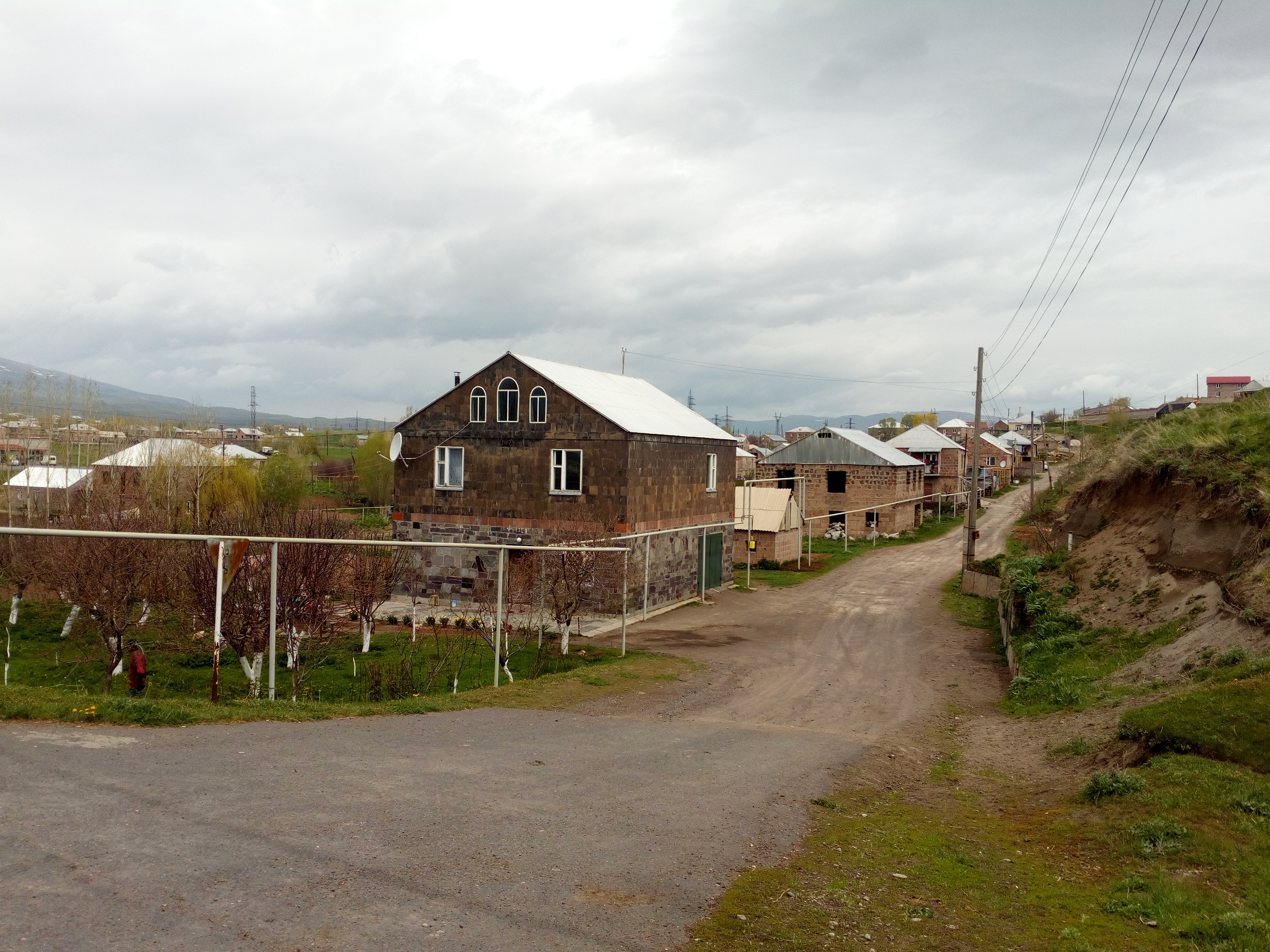
- Hartavan

- Location within Armenia Location within Aragatsotn
- Coordinates: 40°28′41″N 44°24′02″E
- Country: Armenia
- Province: Aragatsotn
- Municipality: Aparan

Population (2011)
  - Total: 930
- Time zone: UTC+4
  - Summer (DST): UTC+5

Hartavan (Armenian: Հարթավան) is a village in the Aparan Municipality of the Aragatsotn Province of Armenia.
