= Ekinciler, Yenişehir =

Village in Turkey

Ekinciler
- Neighbourhood
- Location in Turkey
- Coordinates: 38.1471°N 39.9816°E
- Country: Turkey
- Province: Diyarbakır
- District: Yenişehir
- Population (2025): 960
- Time zone: UTC+3 (TRT)

Ekinciler (Kurdish: Akinciyan) is a neighborhood in the municipality and district of Yenişehir, Diyarbakır Province in Turkey. It is populated by Kurds and had a population of 960 in 2025.
