= Lernahovit, Lori =

Lernahovit Լեռնահովիտ
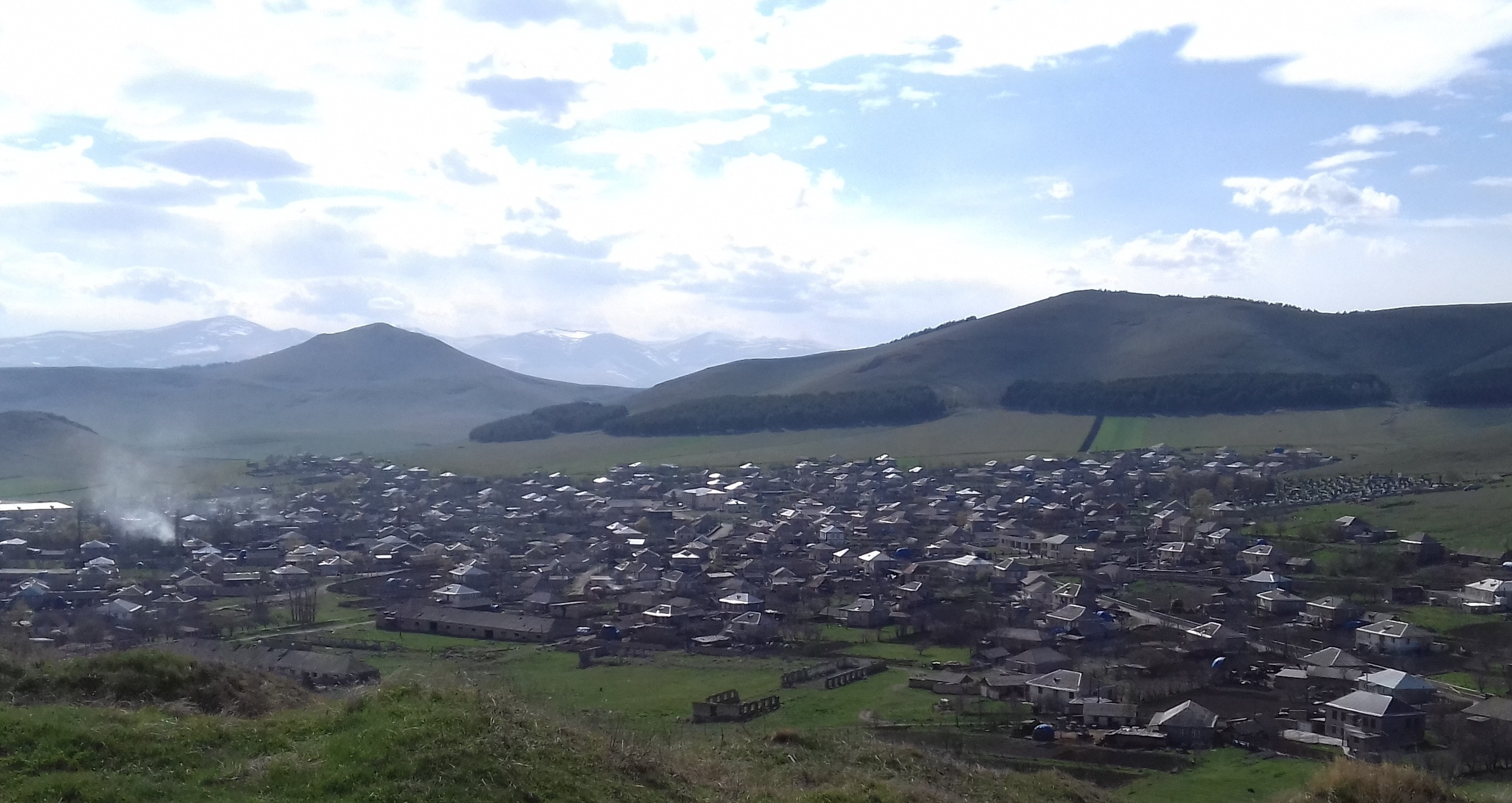
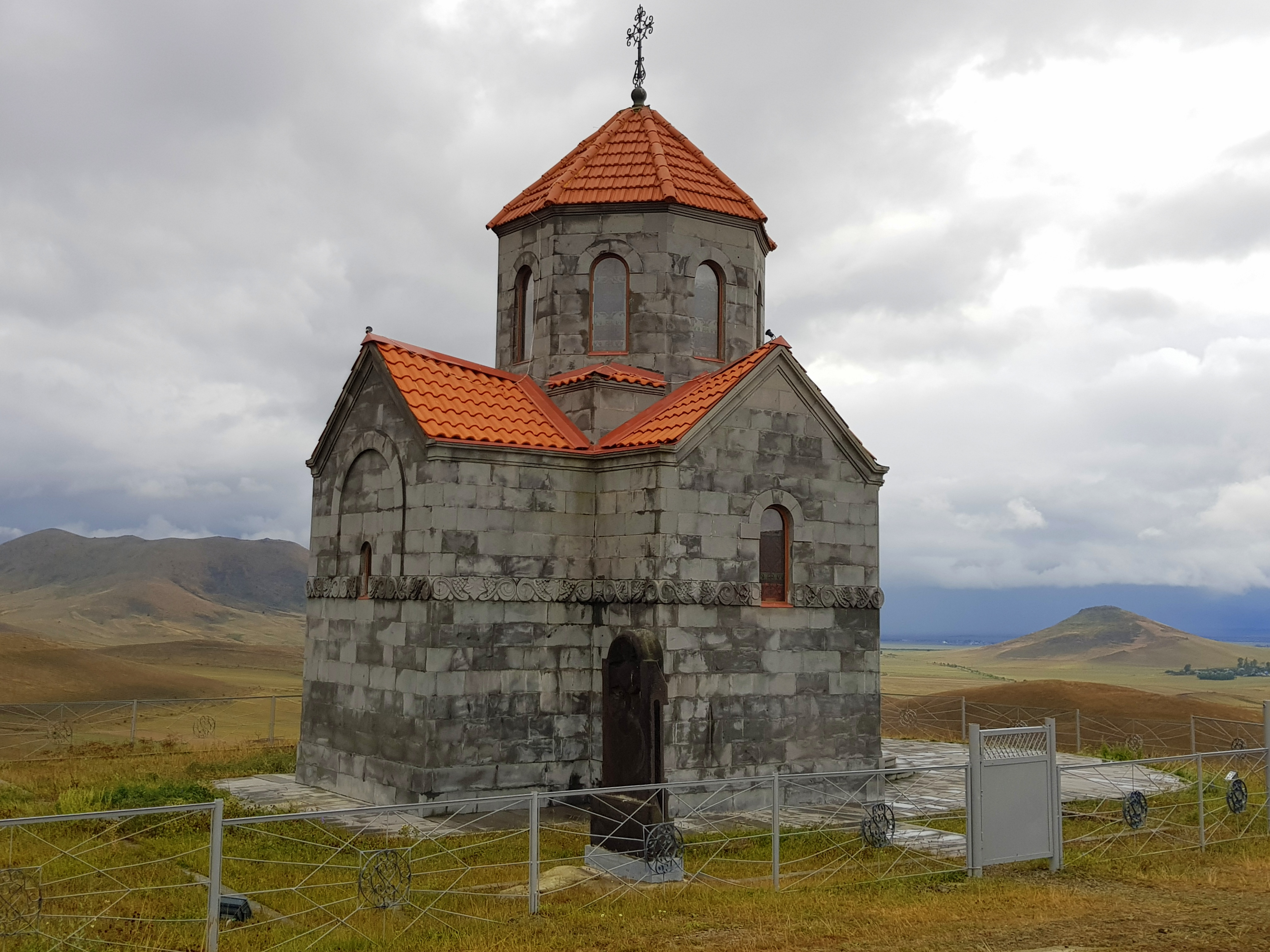
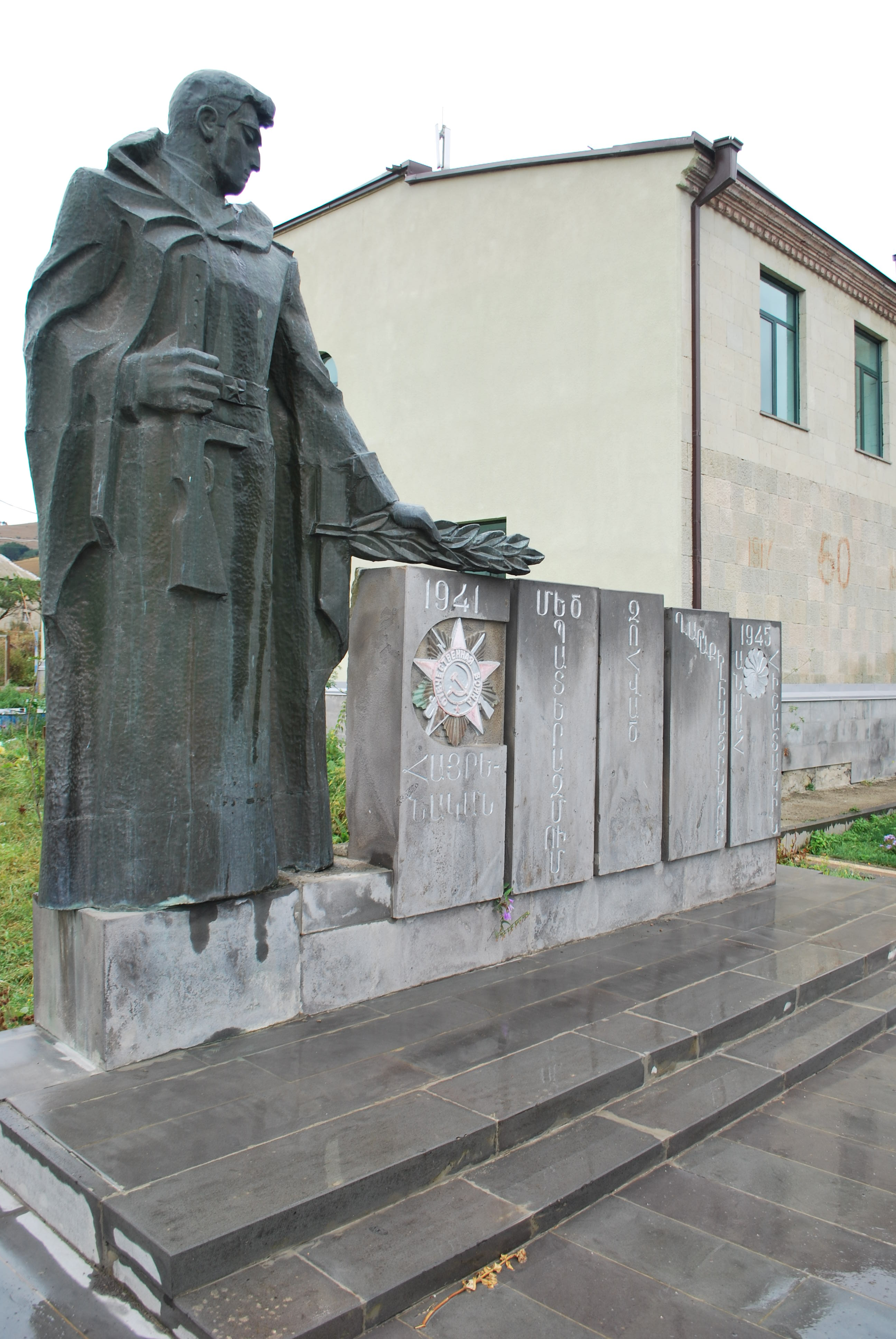
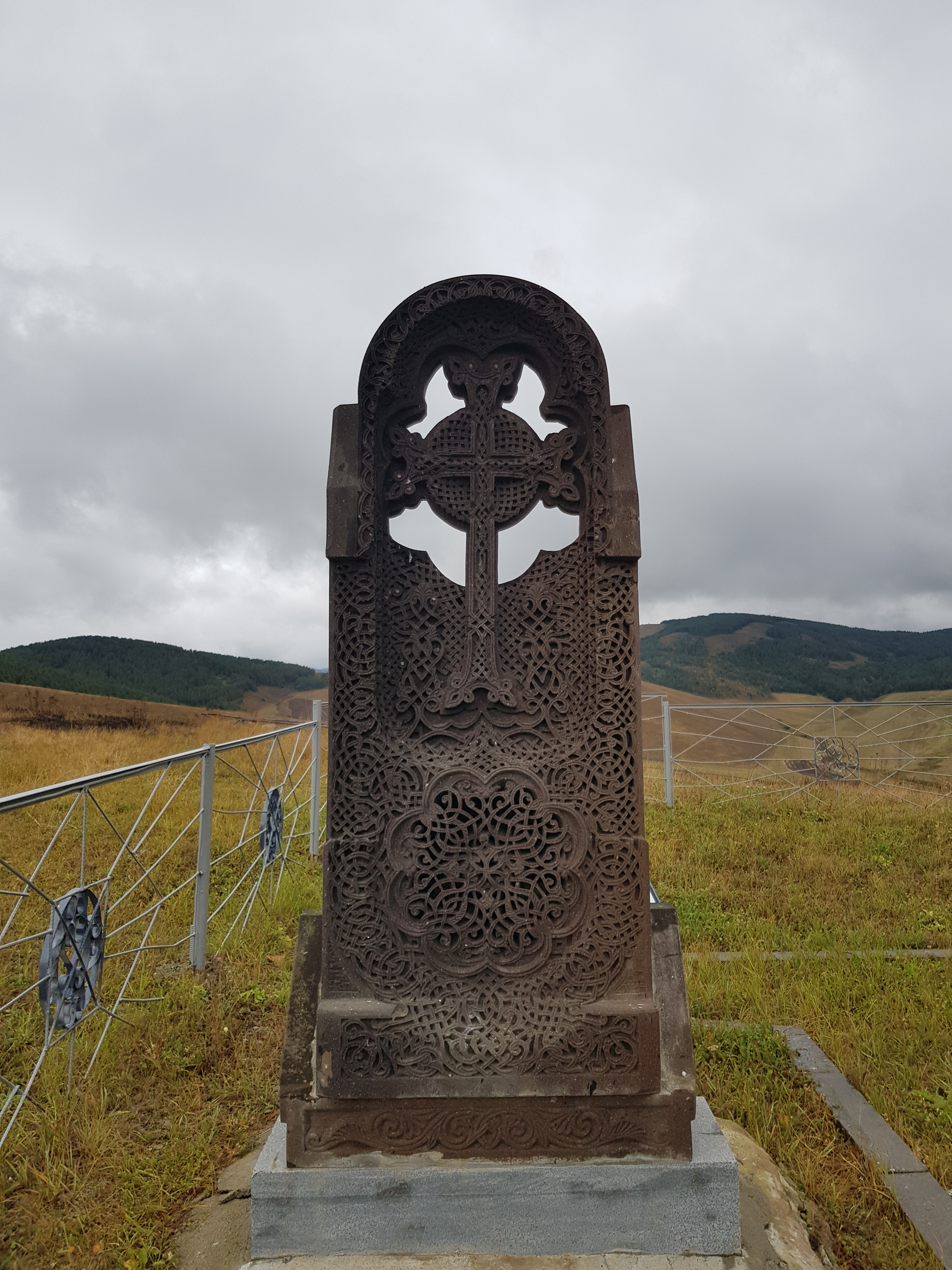
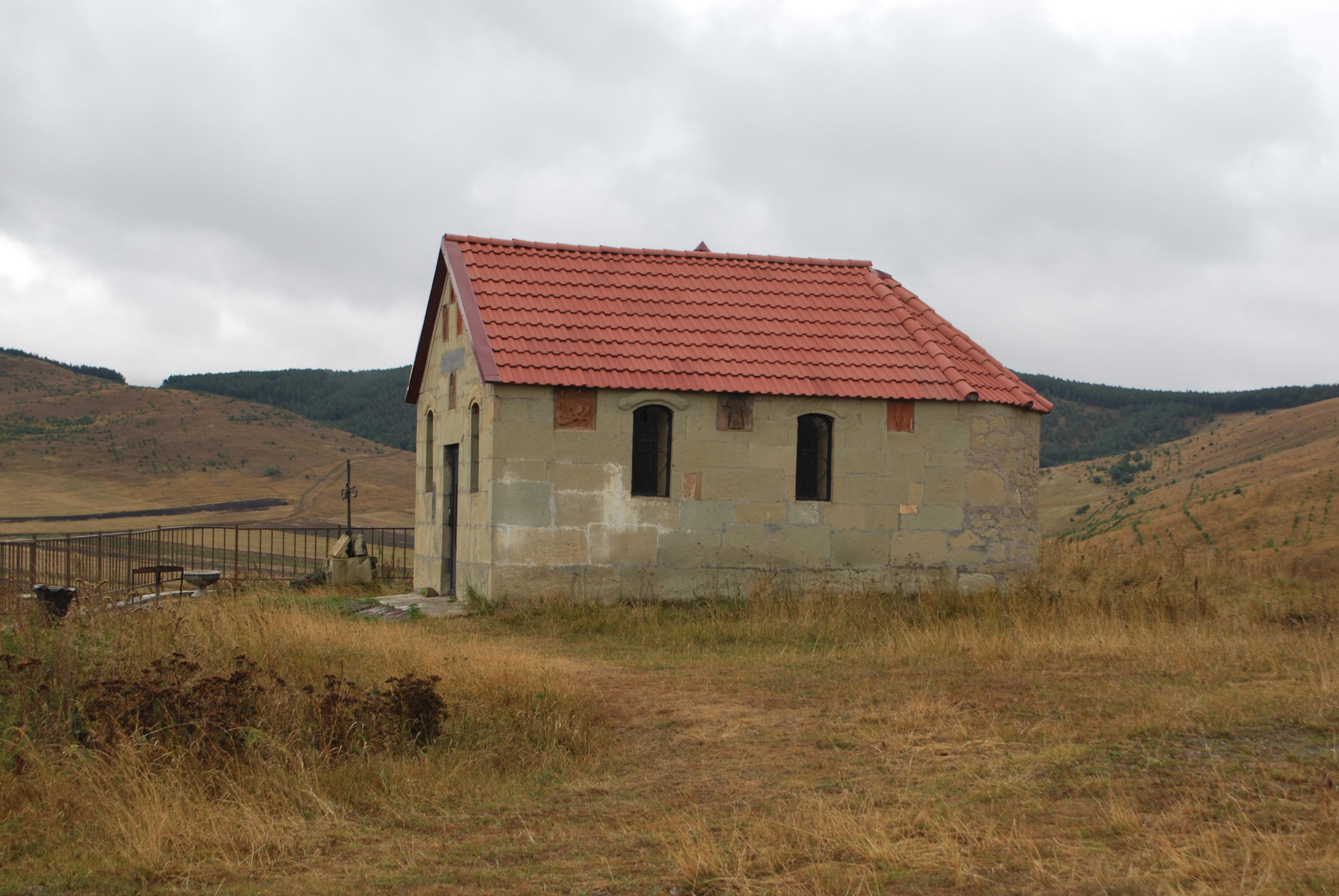

- Location within Armenia
- Coordinates: 41°10′13″N 44°18′36″E
- Country: Armenia
- Marz (Province): Lori

Population (2011)
  - Total: 1,302
- Time zone: UTC+4 ( )
  - Summer (DST): UTC+5 ( )

Lernahovit (Armenian: Լեռնահովիտ, also Romanized as Lernovit, Lerrnhovit, and Lernhovit; formerly, Sisavan and Karakilisa) is a town in the Lori Province of Armenia.
