= Operation Hawk =

- Part of the Kurdistan Workers' Party insurgency
Date	April 1996
Location	Diyarbakır Province and Bingöl Province
Result	Turkish victory

Belligerents
Turkey	PKK

Commanders and leaders
(Turkey) Hilmi Özkök	Unknown

Strength
10,000	Unknown

Casualties and losses
40	241

Operation Hawk (Turkish: Atmaca Harekâtı) was a military operation conducted by the Turkish Armed Forces against Kurdistan Workers' Party (PKK) positions in Diyarbakır and Bingöl in April 1996.

The operation started on the night of 5 April 1996 in mountainous areas between Lice, Hani, Kulp and Genç. As a result, 241 PKK members and 40 Turkish troops died; and 6 PKK members were captured alive. Troops from 7th Corps in Diyarbakır and 8th Corps in Elazığ, Turkish Air Force and units from Gendarmerie General Command and Police Special Operation Department were involved in the operation.
