= Sivritepe, Yenişehir =

Village in Turkey

Sivritepe
- Neighbourhood
- Country: Turkey
- Province: Diyarbakır
- District: Yenişehir
- Population (2022): 683
- Time zone: UTC+3 (TRT)

Sivritepe is a neighbourhood in the municipality and district of Yenişehir, Diyarbakır Province in Turkey. Its population is 683 (2022).
