= August 2011 Turkey–Iraq cross-border raids =

Part of Kurdish–Turkish conflict

- Part of Kurdish–Turkish conflict
Date	August 17–24, 2011
Location	northern Iraq, Turkey
Result	Turkish victory

Belligerents
Turkey: Turkish Air Force	PKK; TAK; PJAK

Commanders and leaders
(Turkey) Mehmet Erden (Turkey) Mehmet Veysi Ağar	Murat Karayılan; Sofi Nurettin

Strength
2,500	800

Casualties and losses
None	90–160 PKK militants killed, 80 wounded unknown civilian casualties PKK claims 3 militants were killed in August 2011
- ROJ TV, PKK's broadcast outlet and the Iraqi Foreign Ministry claimed that 7 Iraqi Kurdish civilians, including three under the age of 18 were killed in a car. ROJ TV has shown pictures which depict a car bombed in a road. In response to these allegations, Turkish ambassador to Iraq has delivered the visual evidence. The surveillance images shows that in the road there is no craters which would be created by high explosive bombs used by the Turkish military.

On August 17, 2011, the Turkish Armed Forces launched multiple raids against Kurdistan Workers' Party (PKK) camps based in Iraq, striking 132 targets. Turkish military bombed PKK targets in northern Iraq in six days of air raids, according to General Staff.

== Background ==
Between July and August in southeast Turkey, PKK fighters killed 40 Turkish security personnel. The Turkish Army launched raids in response to those series of PKK attacks.

== Turkish reprisal operation ==
A day before the operation, PKK fighters ambushed a troop convoy and killed nine soldiers. During six days of air raids, the Turkish Air Force attacked 132 PKK targets in northern Iraq, killing 90 to 100 militants. However, casualty figures could not be confirmed independently. According to Turkish army statements, 80 militants were wounded in the operations, which hit 73 shelters, eight stores and nine anti-aircraft positions.

=== Further attacks ===
In addition to the 132 PKK locations targeted by the Turkish Air Force, 349 targets in Qandil, Hakurk, Avasin-Basyan, Zap and Metina regions were bombed by artillery. Turkish military announced that Turkish jets had bombed PKK targets on Northern Iraq in February 2012 but did not provide details.

== Aftermath ==
Six people were wounded early on 28 August at a beach in Antalya of Turkey, when explosives buried in the sand exploded. The Kurdistan Freedom Hawks (TAK) had previously threatened to launch attacks targeting civilians and tourists. According to Today's Zaman, PKK was responsible for the bombing.

PKK claimed 4 militants were killed on 24 September 2011. PKK claimed 4 additional militants were killed on 28 September 2011, despite the initial claim that no militants were killed.

=== Iranian operation ===
Iran began a new military push against Kurdish rebels on the border with Iraq, days after Turkey said its air strikes had killed up to 160 militants inside Iraqi territory. Iran said it had killed dozens of members of Party of Free Life of Kurdistan (PJAK), an offshoot of the Turkey-based Kurdistan Workers Party (PKK).

== Responses on casualties ==
PKK denied Turkish military's claims on number of dead militants, and said that the number of militants killed released by military was a "baseless fabrication". PKK spokesman Ahmed Deni said three fighters had been killed during initial strikes on Dohuk province in northern Iraq. Barham Ahmed Hama Rasheed, mayor of the town of Rania, and officials in Northern Iraq claimed a family of seven were killed by the Turkish army on Sunday. According to Rasheed, among those killed was a 3-month-old infant. Kardo Mohammed, a member of the Iraqi Kurdish parliament, said the "shelling constituted a breach of international conventions and agreements between the two countries."

=== Kurdish protests ===
2,000 people protested on Sunday in the town of Ranya as victims were buried. Another protest took place on Hakkari, and a member of BDP who was protesting the air assault died.
