= Dökmetaş, Yenişehir =

Village in Turkey

Dökmetaş
- Neighbourhood
- Location in Turkey
- Coordinates: 38.01813°N 40.14154°E
- Country: Turkey
- Province: Diyarbakır
- District: Yenişehir
- Population (2025): 1,798
- Time zone: UTC+3 (TRT)

Dökmetaş (Kurdish: Qerekilîs) is a neighbourhood in the municipality and district of Yenişehir, Diyarbakır Province in Turkey. It is populated by Kurds and had a population of 1,798 in 2025.

== History ==
Dökmetaş is tentatively identified with the village of Qarā Klīsah, which was historically inhabited by Syriac Orthodox Christians and Armenians. (Note: Also known as Karakilisa, Kara Kilise, Karakilise, Kara-Kilisa, Kara-Kilissa, or Zımnıkilise. It is alternatively identified with the village of Akçadamar.) In the Syriac Orthodox patriarchal register of dues of 1870, it was recorded that the village had 6 households, who did not pay any dues, and did not have a church or a priest. There were 6 Armenian hearths in 1880. There was an Armenian church. The village was attacked and plundered during the massacres in the Diyarbekir vilayet in 1895. It was located in the Diyarbakır central district (merkez kaza) in the Diyarbakır sanjak in the Diyarbekir vilayet in c. 1900. In 1914, the village was populated by 200 Syriacs, according to the list presented to the Paris Peace Conference by the Assyro-Chaldean delegation.

== Bibliography ==
- Abed Mshiho Neman of Qarabash (2021) [1918]. Sayfo – An Account of the Assyrian Genocide. Translated by Michael Abdalla; Łukasz Kiczko. Edinburgh University Press.
- Bcheiry, Iskandar (2009). The Syriac Orthodox Patriarchal Register of Dues of 1870: An Unpublished Historical Document from the Late Ottoman Period. Gorgias Press.
- Gaunt, David (2006). Massacres, Resistance, Protectors: Muslim-Christian Relations in Eastern Anatolia during World War I. Gorgias Press.
- Jongerden, Joost; Verheij, Jelle, eds. (2012). Social Relations in Ottoman Diyarbekir, 1870-1915. Brill.
- Kévorkian, Raymond H. (2006). "Demographic Changes in the Armenian Population of Diarbekir, 1895-1914". In Richard G. Hovannisian (ed.). Armenian Tigranakert/Diarbekir and Edessa/Urfa. Mazda Publishers.
- Tîgrîs, Amed; Çakar, Yıldız (2012). Amed : erdnîgarî, dîrok, çand (in Kurdish).
