= October 2007 clashes in Hakkâri =

Clashes between in the Kurdistan Workers' Party (PKK) and the Turkish Army

October 2007 clashes in Hakkari
- Part of the Kurdish–Turkish conflict
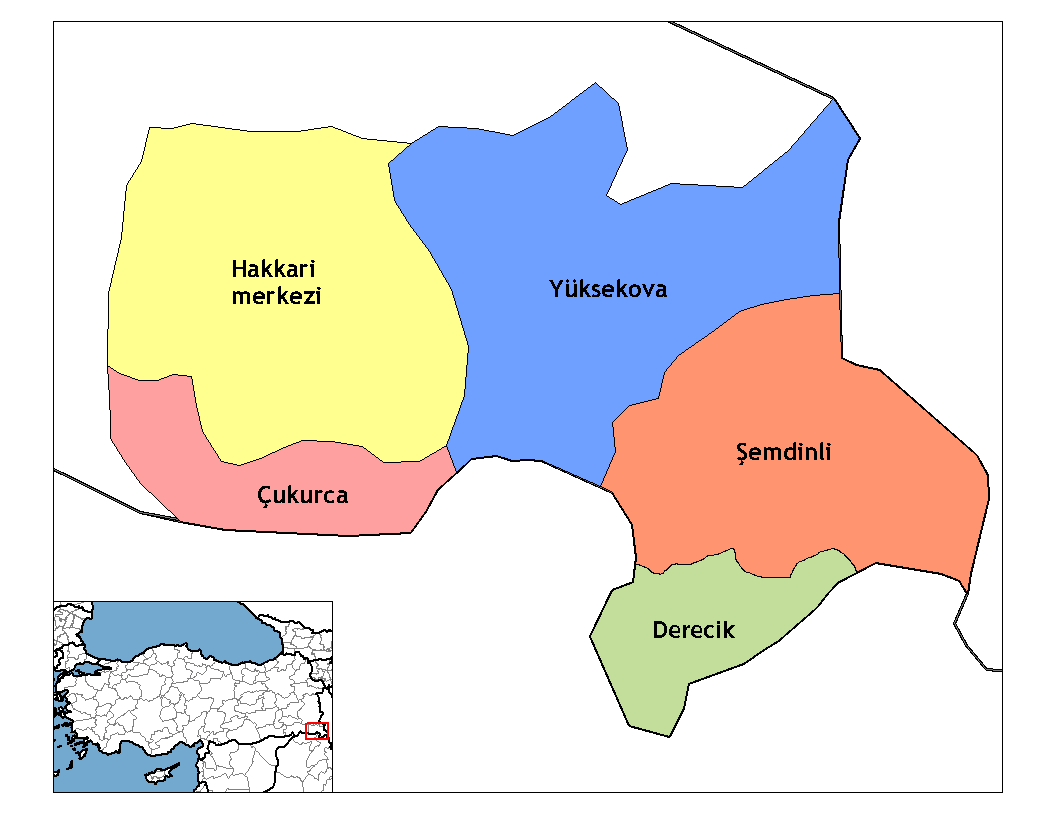
- Districts of Hakkâri Province (Turkey)
Date	7–8 October and 21 October 2007
Location	Hakkâri and Şırnak Provinces

Belligerents
Turkey	Kurdistan Workers' Party (PKK)

Strength
7 October: 18 commandos 21 October: 50 infantrymen	7 October: 45–50 militants 21 October: 150–200 militants

Casualties and losses
25 killed 17 wounded 8 captured(later released)	250+ killed, multiple camps and caves destroyed
- 17 civilians shot by the PKK.

The October 2007 clashes in Hakkari were a series of clashes between the Kurdistan Workers' Party and the Turkish Armed Forces.

== 7–8 October attacks ==
On October 7, a large PKK force ambushed an 18-man Turkish commando unit in the Garbar Mountains of Şırnak Province on 7 October, killing 13 soldiers and wounding three. One PKK fighter was killed. Following the attack, the military shelled areas near the Iraq–Turkey border to prevent the militants from crossing into Northern Iraq.

The fatalities in the October 7 ambush represent the highest death toll suffered by the Turkish military in over a decade and triggered widespread public outrage. In the days following the ambush, the Turkish press was dominated by sketches of the killed soldiers and photographs of their funerals and the grieving relatives they left behind. The ruling Justice and Development Party (AKP) had long resisted calls for a military strike against the PKK camps in Northern Iraq, mainly because of opposition from the United States. As a result, many Turks hold Washington at least partly responsible for the death of any Turkish soldier killed by the PKK.

On October 9, a three and one-half hour meeting of the Supreme Anti-Terrorism Board (TMYK), which comprises government ministers and military and intelligence officials, agreed to establish the necessary legal framework to take additional measures against the PKK, starting with parliamentary approval for the deployment of Turkish troops outside the country.

Some days after, the Grand National Assembly approved a measure granting Turkish troops the right to carry out an incursion into Northern Iraq.

Prior to the attack, Yaşar Büyükanıt, the Chief of the General Staff, made a verbal promise to Kim Kwan-jin, the Chairman of the Joint Chiefs of Staff, that Turkey would guarantee absolute safety for the Zaytun Division stationed at Irbil by treating Korean troops as equally as Turkish soldiers in case of cracking down on Kurdish guerrillas within the Iraqi border.

== 21 October attack ==
PKK blew up the Sharan Bridge, located in the Dağlıca Region of Yüksekova District, where steep and high cliffs and deep cliffs are located, with high explosives before the treacherous attack that shocked Turkey. Thus, PKK, who prevented the military reinforcements from coming to the region, attacked the military unit with heavy weapons about half an hour after the 35-meter-long, 6-meter-wide bridge was destroyed. Only aerial help could reach Dağlıca, which is in a deep valley with steep cliffs resembling a devil's triangle and tens of meters high. The detonator cables of the mine, which was attached to the bridge weighing tons. The PKK attackers then launched an assault on a military outpost, killing 12 soldiers and wounding 16. Eight Turkish soldiers were captured by the PKK.

One of the wounded Turkish soldiers explained the attack in an interview. "At the midnight that was connecting Saturday to Sunday, they infiltrated our unit. They were very crowded. And they came very loaded. We were 50 people on the hill. We had no chance to sleep. We were taking the hill security. We knew they were very close to us, their voices were heard. We were also listening to their radio conversations. According to what I learned from our superiors, One of us, who knew us, said, 'You can come here, this place is defenseless.' They came instantly, they came from everywhere. They especially encircled the top area. We knew they were going to come 2 days ago. There was a lot of them. We saw them on their watch duties, filling and emptying their weapons and reloading, we saw everything they were doing. There was a thermal camera and a night vision camera. We saw everything. Our guys fired 3-4 mortars eight kilometers to the other side."

"I guess the number of people who came was over 150. Because they circled three regions. We were all awake. It started at 12.30 AM at night. At a quarter to 4 o'clock the Cobra helicopters arrived. Until that hour, we always tried to defend. We were out of ammo. I had three magazines left. I took the magazines of our martyred friends. I finished five magazines. I threw a grenade. I found an assault vest. They attacked from above and from behind. We were waiting ahead. They came from places we couldn't get in or out of. We have already identified these. They were fifteen meters ahead of me. They were speaking Kurdish or something. I've always heard their names. They had rockets. They were very solid. There were guys who even brought a couple of Doçka's. It's a very heavy weapon. They brought weapons, grenades.... 7-8 of us were martyred. We were 50 people. We dropped down to 20 people. 14 of them here in the hospital. They are healthy. The rest went with them. Or he was martyred."

"Then when the Cobras started to push, they took the children and left. I think I shot one of them. Because I heard the sound of a grenade dropping. He was ten meters above me. We were downstairs. Many of my friends died with me. I carried two of them on my back to the helicopter. When they left, we gathered the wounded from right and left. I'm injured too, but I'm fine compared to other kids. There is no problem in my health..."

The Turkish Armed Forces sent reinforcements and helicopters to the area shortly afterwards as a retaliation, 32 of the PKK militants were killed in the earlier stages of the operation.

Not far from the scene of the ambush, a minibus with a wedding party hit a landmine believed planted by the PKK. Seventeen civilians (six of them children) were injured and the minibus was completely wrecked. The wounded were airlifted to the Yüksekova hospital.

=== Counterattacks ===
Artillery was fired into Northern Iraq following the 21 October attacks. On early 24 October, AH-1 Cobra helicopters and F-16 Fighting Falcon jets took off of the Diyarbakır Air base and hit PKK camps as far as 50 km into Iraqi territory.

Turkish commandos began a hot pursuit operation in Northern Iraq to find the eight missing Turkish soldiers. Radio chatter among PKK operatives on an open channel claimed that after their photos were taken two of the eight soldiers were taken to Arbil. The soldiers were eventually released on 4 November.

In the search and destroy operation in the vicinity of the attack area, Turkey captured 3 AK-47 assault rifles, 36 hand grenades, one RPG-7 rocket launcher, 27 rockets, 153 AK-47 cartridges, 10 AK-47 magazines and 500 grams of C-4 explosives from the area.

On 28 October, 8,000 Turkish troops with air support carried out a major operation in Tunceli Province, killing 20 PKK members.

=== Reaction ===
Azerbaijan: The Press Secretary of the Foreign Ministry of Azerbaijan Khazar Ibrahim said "PKK is a terrorist organization and Azerbaijan, as a country suffering from the terrorism, understands and supports the actions of Turkey" in a press conference. Attacks by the PKK led to unorganized protests on 21 October 2007 in Baku, Azerbaijan in response.

Belgium: An anti-PKK protest had broken out in Schaerbeek Saint-Josse Belgium. Some 800 protesters have clashed with the police. 100 people were wounded. Some of the protesters rammed into a squad car wounding the 3 police officers inside. 3 people were arrested for attempted murder as a result.

Canada: Minister of Foreign Affairs Maxime Bernier made the statement "Canada condemns the terrorist attacks inflicted upon Turkey by the Kurdistan Workers Party (PKK)."

France: Minister of Foreign Affairs Bernard Kouchner made the statement: "we condemn in the strongest terms the attack by the PKK on October 21 which killed 12 Turkish soldiers. [...] For France and the European Union, the PKK is a terrorist organization which must be determinedly fought everywhere."

Germany: Foreign Office minister Frank-Walter Steinmeier stated that "the federal government condemns any kind of terror in the strongest terms." President of Germany Turkish Society Kenan Kolat declared that "the attacks cannot have any right cause. But to state for our European friends, when it comes to Islamic terror you ask us to oppose but I think our European friends does not have the same sensitivity against terror with us."

Greece: Minister for Foreign Affairs made the statement: "We encouraged the Turkish government in its diplomatic effort once more, condemning every terrorist action that takes place on its territory, something which is a constant Greek position"

Iraq: In preparations to a possible incursion by Turkey into northern Iraq, Iraqi Kurdistan authorities have deployed more Peshmerga fighters to the border. Talabani and Barzani stated that the PKK must leave Iraq if it desires to fight. They further stated that they would not hand a cat let alone a Kurd to the Turkish authorities and that they would not side with anyone. On a separate announcement Barzani said they do not consider the PKK to be a terrorist organization. Iraqi president Talabani said that the PKK will drop arms. After a phone call from Condoleezza Rice, Barzani also asked the PKK to cease fire. Despite this the PKK announced that a cease-fire was not the case. Iraqi prime minister Nouri al-Maliki said that all offices of PKK would be shut and that PKK will be denied the use of Iraqi soil for their operations. Maliki on a discussion with Turkish foreign relations minister Babacan has stated that the PKK is a threat to Iraq as well for attacking the Iraqi oil pipelines, a very important source of income in Iraq.

Italy: President of the Council of Ministers of Italy (Prime Minister) Romano Prodi in a phone call relayed his condolences and solidarity for the act of terrorism on 26 October.

Japan: Ministry of Foreign Affairs made the statement: "The Government of Japan is concerned over the recent security situation in the Republic of Turkey where a number of people including civilians have been victimized by the terrorist attacks of the Kurdistan Workers' Party (PKK). Terrorism cannot be justified for any reason. The Government of Japan emphatically condemns the latest series of violence by the PKK. The Government of Japan calls upon the Government of Iraq to take appropriate measures to stop the terrorist activities of PKK members hiding in northern Iraq, and the Government of Turkey to exercise utmost self-restraint. Japan hopes that the situation will swiftly calm down with the cooperation of the countries concerned."

Turkey: Attacks by the PKK has led to a series of unorganized protests that had taken place on 21 October 2007 in various cities throughout Turkey in response. In Istanbul the protests centered around Taksim Square, where political activists gave away small Turkish flags to the people congregating there. All scheduled concerts and entertainment programs were canceled in reaction to the attacks. Various Turkish business persons have condemned the attacks. 350 being women a total of 4,500 signed up as volunteers to join the armed forces to fight against the PKK. 1,200 of the 4,500 had already completed heir mandatory military service. The Turkish government is currently debating how to respond to the attacks. Turkey may cut the electricity she is selling to northern Iraq whether or not this will be cut hasn't been decided on yet. Turkish military presence at the Iraqi border has reached "highest levels" with numerous reinforcements of Tanks and other military hardware. Turkey demanded that Turkey may decide not to perform a land based operation in Northern Iraq by the Neighboring Countries of Iraq meeting on 2 November on the conditions that Iraq start returning the PKK leaders on a 150-person list already handed to Iraq and that the envoy that will come to Turkey tomorrow (25 October) to have useful intelligence information with them.

United Kingdom: In a press conference with the Turkish Prime Minister Erdogan, Prime Minister of the United Kingdom Gordon Brown said that they "absolutely and unequivocally condemn the terrorist violence of the PKK" and further added that they are signing a strategic partnership with Turkey.

United States: Head of foreign affairs Secretary of State Condoleezza Rice asked Turkey to give them a few days to respond to the attacks properly. The Turkish prime minister said that Rice was implying that the US may act together with Turkey. US president George W. Bush called the Turkish president Abdullah Gül and assured that they are with Turkey on the war against the PKK. He also added that he will continue to pressure Iraqis to take action against the PKK. David M. Satterfield, senior adviser on Iraq to United States Secretary of State Condoleezza Rice, has said that they are not pleased with the lack of action by the Kurdish leaders.

US & UK: In a joint statement US Secretary of State Condoleezza Rice and UK Foreign Secretary David Miliband announced that they "condemn the latest attacks by the PKK terrorist group against Turkey and its citizens." In the statement they further urged the "Iraqi and Kurdish Regional Government authorities to take immediate steps to halt PKK operations from Iraqi territory."

NATO: Secretary General of NATO Jaap de Hoop Scheffer "firmly condemned" the latest PKK attack on behalf of the NATO Allies.

European Union: President of the European Parliament Hans-Gert Pöttering has stated a "total condemnation of the terrorist violence perpetrated by the PKK in Turkish territory, in particular the attacks carried out over this last weekend". The statement further urged that "the International Community, in particular all the main stakeholders in the region, must support Turkey's efforts to protect its population and fight terrorism" President of the European Commission José Manuel Barroso said that Turkey has a right to defend herself. He further added that they condemned PKK's attack.
