= History of the Kurdistan Workers' Party =

The history of the Kurdistan Workers' Party (PKK) began in 1974 as a Marxist–Leninist organization under the leadership of Abdullah Öcalan. In 1978 the organization adopted the name "Kurdistan Workers Party" and waged its low-level Urban War in Turkish Kurdistan between 1978 and 1980. The PKK restructured itself and moved the organization structure to Syria between 1980 and 1984, after the 1980 Turkish coup d'état. The Kurdish–Turkish conflict began in earnest in 1984. The rural-based insurgency lasted between 1984 and 1992. The PKK shifted its activities to include urban attacks against Turkish military bases between 1993–1995 and later 1996–1999. Öcalan was captured in Kenya in early 1999. After a "self-declared peace initiative of 1999", hostilities resumed in February 2004. 2013 saw another ceasefire, but the conflict resumed again in 2015 and has continued since.

Since 1978, the PKK has been able to evolve and adapt, having gone through a metamorphosis, which became the main factor in its survival. It has gradually grown from a handful of political students to an armed organization of thousands.

== Origin ==
The PKK's origins can be traced back to 1974, when Abdullah Öcalan ("Apo") and a small group of leftist students from the Revolutionary Youth Federation of Turkey (Dev-Genç) decided to develop a Kurdish-based left-wing organization. The members of this new, small organization actively participated in different branches of Dev-Genç. In 1971, Öcalan joined the underground movements trying to overthrow the government system, which he saw as oppressive and fascist, while he was a student at the Ankara University Political Sciences Faculty. Öcalan was also sympathetic with the People's Liberation Party of Turkey (THKO)., As a result of the military coup of 1971, many militants of the revolutionary had to go underground; movements like the People's Liberation Army of Turkey (THKO) or the Communist Party of Turkey/Marxist–Leninist (TKP-ML) were cracked down upon and forbidden. After this, several of the political actors of the Turkish left organized away from the public in university dorms or in meetings in shared apartments. In 1972-1973 the organization's core ideological group was made up largely of students led by Abdullah Öcalan ("Apo") in Ankara who made themselves known as the Kurdistan Revolutionaries. The new group focused on the oppressed Kurdish population of Turkish Kurdistan in a capitalist world. Öcalan used the social networks that he developed during this period to become a leader. Like Dev-Genç, Apocus was a splinter organization.

What made Apocus, later PKK, different was that it decided to move its activities from Ankara, the capital city of Turkey, to Turkish Kurdistan, near the Syria-Turkey border. Unlike most Kurdish political parties, which adopted a rather conservative outlook and were organized around tribal leaders and structures, Apocus had a fierce stance, strong convictions, and a disciplined but decentralized organization which contributed to a steady rise and growing effectiveness Much of the early development was inspired by the rise of decolonization movements and their potential to be adapted to the Kurdish question.

== Apocular (1974–1978) ==
The core of the organization established with 16 members, led by political science student Öcalan, later to be his wife Kesire Yildirim, Cemil Bayik, Baki Karer, Kemal Pir, Mehmet Sevgat, Mehmet Karasungur and ten other members with the name Ankara Democratic Association of Higher Education (ADYÖD). The organization was located in Ankara. During this period, Öcalan and his supporters were generally known as Apocus, in Turkish "Apocular". Today, there are only a few still living or following the cause, a result of a combination of factors, including disputes internal to the PKK.

Although originally based in Ankara, Öcalan decided that there was a better base in south-east Turkey. Öcalan recognized that he can organize and build a secure base to perform activities by using the tribal system in the region. He focused on tribes that are not historically coexisting peacefully with the government. Thus, Öcalan focused much of his attention from 1976–78 to building a PKK structure in that region. It was a secret organization, but deciphered by Turkish Intelligence in 1977.

On May 18, 1977, Haki Karer, who belonged to small group of confidants, a housemate of Öcalan, not a Kurd but a Turk from Ordu, was dispatched to Gaziantep to recruit new members. He was involved in a political discussion with another left Kurdish faction called Sterka Sor (Red Star) in a coffee shop. He was killed in Gaziantep, allegedly by members of the Kurdish group Sterka Sor. This was the first resistance against Apocular by a rival Kurdish group. From that moment Apocular become more careful, strict and violent. In the party's historiography, the death of Haki Karer is related to the decision to deepen and strengthen the struggle.

On 27 November 1978, during a meeting in a village called Fis, in the district of Lice, north of Diyarbakir, it was decided to form a political party. The name of the party, Partiya Karkerên Kurdistanê was decided on later, in April 1979, when the meeting of the central committee. The meeting in Fis later got to be remembered as the First Congress of the PKK. 24 people were invited of which 22 attended. It was decided that the people present at the meeting, together with former revolutionaries who died, were to be the first members of the party. Elected as General Secretary was Öcalan, and as members of the Central Executive Committee Mehmet Karasunğur and Sahin Dönmez. Karasungur was also elected as the responsible for the armed resistance. The ideological footprints during this period was detailed in the proclamation. The official release of the "Proclamation of Independence of PKK", a document, stated that primary objective was to foster a communist revolution in Turkey. The group did not claim to be secessionist in this document. They wanted a proletarian revolution inspired by the ideas of Marxism that aims to replace capitalism with communism. The group attracted many oppressed Kurdish students.

== Urban War (1978–1980) ==
Starting in 1978, the organization attacked groups that they perceived as "fascist" and pro-government. The PKK focused its attacks primarily against perceived state collaborators, and Kurdish tribes that had historically coexisted with the government and haven't supported the Kurdish rights.

In 1979 Mehmet Celal Bucak a high-ranking member of the conservative Justice Party (AP) was condemned for "exploiting the peasants", and "collaborating with government" against the Kurdish right. PKK decided to use fighting against the landlords in Hilvan and Siverek to show up its nationalism ideology. PKK failed in its attempt to assassinate Mehmet Celal Bucak. This was the first known activity by the PKK. The planned assassination was an example of propaganda-of-the-deed.

On November 28, 1979, the first response of the government was performed. Turkey did not know the name PKK but listed the organization with its old name Apocular. 242 members of this organization were captured at Hilvan and Siverek residences. Bucak tribe became an enemy to PKK and from 1979 to 1991, the Bucak tribe lost 140 members to clashes with the PKK.

In two years, the country turned into a battleground. From 1978 to 1982, the Turkish National Security Council recorded approximately 43,000 incidents it described as "terrorism". The overall number of death people of the 1970s is estimated at 5,000 including civilians. With the 1980 assassination of a former prime minister, Nihat Erim who was assassinated by radical Turkish leftist organization Dev Sol, the discovery of gun depots, civil disorder, political indecision (parliament was unable to select a president) and, most importantly, the Iran–Iraq War, a coup took place, initiating a series of trials. In the central trial, against the left-wing organization Devrimci Yol (Revolutionary Path) at Ankara Military Court, the defendants listed 5,388 political killings before the military coup. Among the victims were 1,296 right wingers and 2,109 left-wingers. The others could not clearly be related. In this period, the number of deaths attributed to the PKK was approximately 240. Many right-wing organizations saw the PKK as a threat to their existence. The military tribunals of the 1980 coup which tried 7,000 people revealed a recorded 5,241 dead and 14,152 wounded from 1979 to 1980. The PKK made up 21% of the total 5,241 caseload.

Following imprisonment, the captured PKK members set up an elaborate resistance organization that would operate even behind bars. This organization became famous for their hunger strikes. They also smuggled in guns and communication equipment into prison. Recruitment and training became commonplace for imprisoned PKK members.

All through this time, Öcalan eluded capture and remained in control. He fled the country towards Syria in 1979. Even before the coup, Öcalan knew that he had to restructure the PKK to continue its activities. In 1979, when Öcalan moved to the Bekaa valley in Lebanon, he had chance to develop his connection from where Dev-Genç left. His initial accommodations were covered through the already established Armenian Secret Army for the Liberation of Armenia (ASALA) structure and Fatah camps, in part of ex-Syrian-controlled Lebanon. Until 1999 Syria had provided valuable safe havens to the organization in the region of Beqaa Valley.

== Syria (1980–1984) ==
On November 10, 1980, the PKK bombed the Turkish consulate in Strasbourg, France, in a joint operation with the ASALA, which they described as the beginning of a "fruitful collaboration" in a statement claiming responsibility. It was alleged that Soviet Armenian KGB officer Karen Brutents was behind the militant structure that was adapted by PKK and methods used by ASALA. Since pro-Soviet Armenians had participated in the founding of an anti-Turkish Kurdish party already in 1927, the theories, arguments, propaganda methods and activity structures were well established. According to the former KGB-FSB officer Alexander Litvinenko, who was assassinated in 2006, PKK's Öcalan was trained by KGB-FSB. Besides, Öcalan managed to compel Qais Abd al Karim, the leader of the Democratic Front for the Liberation of Palestine (DFLP), to support the military training of PKK militants in Lebanon. In the early 1980s, some 300 PKK militants were provided with education in guerilla warfare. With time, similar agreements were met with the Fatah of Yassir Arafat or the Palestinian Popular Struggle Front (PPSF) of Samir Ghawshah. In the early 1980s, some 300 PKK militants were provided with education in guerilla warfare. An alliance was also reached with Masoud Barzani's KDP, who permitted the PKK to operate in the valleys of the Lolan region in Iraqi Kurdistan close to the borders to Iran and Turkey.

From August 20–25, 1982, the second congress of the PKK was held in a Palestinian Camp at the border between Syria and Lebanon. During the congress a guerilla warfare strategy was formulated. It was decided there should be three phases of guerilla warfare: strategic defense, strategic balance and strategic offense. Small units of the PKK should return to Turkey and get engaged in armed confrontations until autumn of 1983. But the planning took longer than expected and armed confrontations began on the 15 August 1984. During the congress Çetin Güngör criticized the lack of democracy within the PKK. He had not enough support to be satisfied, left the PKK and kept criticizing the PKK in public meetings. In one of those meetings in Sweden in 1985 he was killed. Öcalan consolidated his resources at the training camps in Bekaa valley. PKK build up a new power base. This marked the beginning of the second stage of PKK's efforts to establish control of southeastern Turkey.

It was claimed that at Ain al-Hilweh near to the largest Palestinian refugee camp located on the outskirts of the port of Sidon in Lebanon, the organization developed links with paramilitary groups among other ethnic groups which has harbored historic grievances against Turkey such as the ethnic Armenian ASALA. The links extended to groups which shared its left-wing nationalist ideology such as the Palestine Liberation Organisation, ETA, and, to a lesser degree, the Provisional Irish Republican Army. During this period, through the large Kurdish immigration in Germany, it has also formed close contacts with left-wing political groups in that country. The link with German left-wing political groups extended to supply of militants, such as Eva Juhnke.

The establishment of the Kurdistan Liberation Force (Hêzên Rizgariya Kurdistan – HRK) was announced on 15 August 1984. From 1984, the PKK became a paramilitary group with training at camps in Turkish Kurdistan, Iraqi Kurdistan, Syria, Lebanon and France. The PKK received significant support from the Syrian government, which allowed it to maintain a headquarters in Damascus, as well as some support from the governments of Iran, Iraq, and Libya. It began to launch attacks and bombings against Turkish governmental installations, the military, and various institutions of the state. The organization focused on attacks against Turkish military targets, although civilian targets were also hit. On the December 15, 1984 the organization and other left-oriented groups including Workers Party of Turkey, Communist Labour Party of Turkey, Communist Party of Turkey, Socialist Party of Turkish Kurdistan and Socialist Workers Party of Turkey signed a protocol to work together.

== Paramilitary I (1984–1992) ==
1984 marked the beginning of sustained paramilitary action by the PKK, attacking government mainly personnel and infrastructure associated with Southeastern Anatolia Project, as well as some civilian (collaborators) targets. Initially the PKK insurgence was branded as just another Kurdish revolt, the 29th revolt, by the Turkish government, and it was declared, it would be crushed just as the ones before as well.

With the Kurdish National Liberation Front (ERNK), which was formed in 1985, gave the insurgence another organizational structure. Eventually, military operations were handed over from the ERNK to the Kurdistan Popular Liberation Army (ARGK). The ERNK remained, but largely as a front for the ARGK. At the Third Party Congress in October 1986, the Peoples Liberation Army of Kurdistan (Artêşa Rizgariye Gelê Kurdistan – ARGK) was founded and succeeded the HRK.

In 1988, Tehran gave permission to open PKK camps close to Iran's border.

In 1989, the organization concluded an alliance with a number of extreme left wing guerrilla groups to exchange ability and methods to strike in big cities.

=== Hot pursuit ===
Since 1982, the Iran-Iraq war gave Kurdish organizations in Northern Iraq a free hand because Iraq needed and moved its troops to the front in the South. The organization used this to develop cross border attacks from Iraq. The relations between the Marxist PKK and Barzani's conservative KDP were never cordial, but the latter nevertheless allowed organization to operate from the KDP controlled areas and in the south of the Iraqi-Turkish border. This gave the PKK two routes of penetration into Turkey, directly from Syria and over Iraq From 1986–1987, Turkey engaged with Hot pursuit towards the organization members through cross border into northern Iraq. The cross border incidents were archived with the approval of the then-Iraqi government under president Saddam Hussein.

The organization reached an its highest operational activity during the Gulf War (August 1990 – February 1991). Turkey opened its Iraqi border to the Iraqi refugees. This allowed Kurdish and Iraqi refugees, to enter Turkey. The Gulf War also extensively undermined Baghdad's control over the Kurds in Iraq and Barzani and Talabani have controlled the area. A power vacuum was created north of 36th Parallel which enabled the PKK to establish bases and training camps in northern Iraq.

In 1992, Turkey decided to change the operational functionality of their hot pursuits to target the organization's camps, launching major operations towards the end of the year. A Turkish delegation visited Damascus in Syria in 1992, following which Syria agreed to close down the larger PKK training camps in the Beqaa Valley.

=== Trans-nationalization ===
The PKK could count with a strong support from the Kurdish European Diaspora, notably from the diaspora in Germany. After sympathizers of the PKK launched a wave of arson attacks against Turkish institutions in Germany, it was declared a terrorist organization in 1993. On September 30, 1995, Damascus contacts between the high ranking German MP Heinrich Lummer of the Christian Democratic Union of Germany (CDU) and intelligence officials in Damascus. In a meeting between Lummer and Abdullah Öcalan in Damascus in 1996, Öcalan has assured Lummer that it was the PKKs aim to find a peaceful solution for their activities in Germany. The PKK also demanded that it should be recognized as a legitimate entity and not as a terrorist organization in Germany, a demand to which Germany did not accede to. In October 1997, Eva Juhnke a German guerrilla fighter from the armed wing of organization was captured during a military operation by KDP forces in North Iraq. KDP extradited this operative to Turkey.

== Paramilitary II (1993–1995) ==
Turkey recognized it was impossible to eliminate the organization as a fighting force as long as it could retreat to Syria, Iraq and Iran. The organization's revenues have been estimated by various countries at US$200–500 million annually during the 1990s. Turkish authorities claimed that after Kurdish activist and state support, an important source of income became drug trafficking as substantial amounts of heroin formerly transiting Iran were now re-routed through Iraq after the war in Iraq (Gulf War). The PKK had denied all accusations that their members had been involved in drug trafficking. Turkish authorities also claimed that the organization had been working on developing methods of drug-trafficking and according to Interpol's records, 298 people somehow connected with the organization were arrested for drug trafficking between 1984 and 1993. According to Aliza Marcus, an expert who has analyzed the PKK since the 80's, it doesn't seem that the PKK, as an organization, directly produced or traded in narcotics.

With the increase of Turkey's activities to cope with the PKK, 10 percent of income was spent on fighting against the PKK. One year the military spent $8,000,000,000 in operational expenses, and PKK's activity was not curbed. The PKK succeeded to get support from Kurdish activists.

Later in 1993, the PKK supporters allegedly launched coordinated attacks involving firebombs and vandalism on Turkish diplomatic and commercial offices in six West European, 3 Middle-East and 2 African countries.

On March 19, 1993, PKK put an end to the long-standing PKK vendetta against the other Kurdish parties through an agreement with the Kurdistan Socialist Party. In a turning point in the organizations structure, during 1995 Turkish authorities claimed that 30% of the captured or killed PKK members were Syrian nationals of Armenian origin or other Syrians.

The Gulf War changed the political situation. Turkey passively supported the war. The border with Iraq became the worst border. There was an authority that Turkey could communicate with in Syria and Iran, but the Gulf War left North Iraq with what Turkey has called a "vacuum of control". Also, Iraq assisted the organization as a retaliation for the passive support. The aid was meant to serve as a retaliation against Turkey due to its anti-Iraq policy. Later Operation Provide Comfort used Incirlik air base in Turkey to create an autonomous area for Iraq Kurds.

=== Marking the border ===
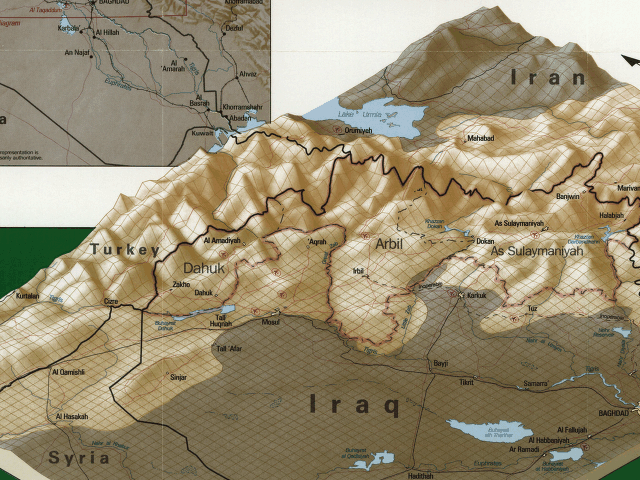
Marking Iraq-Turkey border

After the Halabja poison gas attack in 1988, 36,000 Kurdish refugees were located in Diyarbakir. Iraq began to spread out its problems to Turkey. After the Gulf War of 1991, the problem was not just PKK insurgency. It was a humanitarian problem that can turn into a regional war. Turkey didn't want to open border for Kurdish refugees.

The "vacuum of power in North Iraq" refers to a security concept related to creation of a "safe haven" in North Iraq. Its first use was attributed to Turgut Özal. The goal has been stated as stabilization of economical, social, and cultural the conditions of Kurds under "Unified Iraq." The "Unified Iraq" has been the dominant position for Turkish foreign policy. Turkey was strictly against any kind of independent Kurdish state in Iraq. This sentiments was apparent during the "March 1" incident, in which Kurdish origin representatives prevented Turkey's participation to 2003 invasion of Iraq. Turkey with its Kurdish population is sensitive to the short term and long-term problems of Iraqi Kurds.

In May 1995, Suleyman Demirel proposed moving the border from the heights to stop the insurgency:

The border on those heights is wrong. Actually, that is the boundary of the oil region. Turkey begins where that boundary ends. Geologists drew that line. It is not Turkey's national border. That is a matter that has to be rectified. I said some time ago that 'the area will be infiltrated when we withdraw [from northern Iraq].' ... The terrorists will return. We will be confronted with a similar situation in two or three months. So, let us correct the border line. Turkey cannot readjust its border with Iraq by itself. The border line on the heights has to be brought down to the lower areas. I only want to point out that the border line is wrong. Had it been in the low areas at the foot of the mountains, the [PKK] militants would not have been able to assemble in that region.

— Suleyman Demirel, Middle East Quarterly, September 1995

This proposal was rejected by Iraq and consequently Iran and Arab countries. Turkey decided to mark the Iraq-Turkey border and eliminate the free movement of the organization in this region. There were ten southeastern provinces located in the mountainous border. On the Turkish side of the border 3000 residential units which had 378,335 villagers were forcefully displaced. Thermal cameras were located on the border. Despite this new project, the government even failed to destroy PKK camps inside of Turkey and also stop their members entering Turkey.

On June 3, 1997, the Commission on Internal Migration was established to study the controversial loss of residential units. A numerous of sources accused Turkey of war crimes, forced displacement and human right violations.

While marking the Turkey-Iraq border, Turkey was seeking a way to eliminate the "vacuum of power" created within the north Iraq no-fly zone.

=== Vacuum of power ===
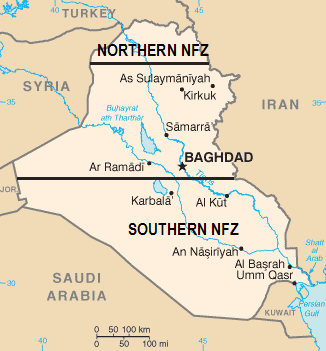
No-fly zone detail

In April 1991, Iraqi no-fly zones created during the Gulf War by the enforcing powers related to United Nations Security Council Resolution 688 as authorising the operations, which Boutros Boutros-Ghali called the no-fly zones "illegal" in a later interview with John Pilger. Turkey supported US-led coalition that formed Iraqi no-fly zones. No-fly zones generated a control vacuum which later used by PKK. Iran did not want to have the no-fly zone that can be easily influenced by US-led coalition.

Turkish sources claimed that Iran's response to these activities was also shaped by supporting PKK. In order to adapt to the end of the Soviet System (1991) and gain Iran's support the organization amended or abandoned its communist secular ideology to better accommodate and accept Islamic beliefs. Beginning in 1993, PKK members allegedly launched attacks from Iranian soil. Heat-seeking SA-7 missiles were given by Iran to prevent Turkish operations in Iraq. Organization used SA-7 missiles effectively against Turkey during Turkey's involvement in Iraqi Kurdish Civil War. During the 1990s, Greece and Iran were accused of providing PKK with supplies in the form of weapons and funds. Both Greece and Iran denied accusations.

On October 4, 1992, the Kurdish government in Erbil announced that "PKK should either withdraw from the border bases or be expelled." On March 17, 1993, Öcalan declared a unilateral ceasefire in Barelias, Lebanon in presence of Jalal Talabani. He declared that the PKK does not intend "to separate from Turkey." On the 16 April 1993 Öcalan announced that the ceasefire was to become indefinite. But canceled the ceasefire after the fighting began anew in the same year. The organization moved its military camps to Northern Iraq. Syria had only ideological training, intelligence, health and recreation installations.

International discussions were going on about a new state in North Iraq, based on the concept of Iraq Federation. UN channelled money to Iraq Federation. With inclusion of the solution for elimination of the PKK's ability to use North Iraq, Turkey joined the US-led coalition to bring truce among the Iraqi Kurds. Two sets of negotiations were tried. US-brokered Drogheda talks on August 9–11, 1995 appeared to be leading to a settlement of the KDP-PUK fight as well as to security guarantees in the form of the KDP controlling the Turkish border.

Turkey feared that the KDP-PUK conflict would create a power vacuum in northern Iraq that would facilitate the organization. Turkey performed Operation Steel (Turkish: Çelik Harekâtı) between March 20 and May 4, 1995, before the official negotiations began. Some 35,000 Turkish troops moved into northern Iraq attempting to clean out PKK strongholds during the period March 20 – May 2, 1995. The attempt failed. This activity was aimed at giving the conditions of Drogheda talks a chance by eliminating the PKK's infrastructure from the region. Operation Steel gave the chance of Iraqi Kurds building their own control system, but only if they prevent the PKK extending its infrastructure. Drogheda negotiations were killed because of the regional effects on Syria and Iran. To derail this unification, just after the Drogheda Talks II September 12, 1995, PKK launched attacks (September 25, 1995) against the KDP. PKK was saying it can not be ignored.

During 1995 Öcalan declared his intention to form a "National United Front." National United Front summarized its political objective as a "total national democratic liberation war against the escalating total warfare." By establishing some type of government-in-exile or Kurdish federation, PKK was responding to a coalition which was trying to unite Iraqi Kurds.

A second set of failed negotiations among Kurdish groups in Iraq were performed during October 1996 which was called Ankara Peace Process. It was believed that Turkey tried to provide support for Kurdish groups if they join Turkey in war against the PKK.

== Paramilitary III (1996–1999) ==
On May 27, 1996, PKK ordered a hunger strike for its members and supporters in the jails. In July, 314 prisoners in 43 prisons in 38 provinces were on fasting to the death and over 2,070 were on hunger strike. Beginning with 1996 organization abandoned its previous strategy of attacking Kurds whom they claimed to be government puppets. It focused on military targets. At the end of 1996, the PKK leader Öcalan signed a cooperation protocol with the Revolutionary People's Liberation Party-Front (DHKP-C) which later failed.

In December 1998, Öcalan allegedly told the Kurdish satellite television channel Med-TV that his own militants are "no better than murderers".

=== Iraqi Kurdish Civil War (1997) ===
The Iraqi Kurdish Civil War took place between rival Kurdish factions in the mid-1990s. Over the course of the conflict, the various factions drew Kurdish factions from Iran and Turkey, as well as Iranian, Iraqi, American forces into the fighting. On friendly terms with the PUK, the PKK began attacking KDP Peshmergas and members of the KDP. The PKK was moved to Qandil mountains from Bekaa Valley after the civil war ended.

Some of the heaviest fighting of the entire KDP-PUK civil war ensued starting October 13, 1997. Hundreds were killed and thousands displaced. PUK used six GRAD missiles in Suleymaniye. There were no negotiations to bring a truce. Same missiles were used against military targets in Turkey. From Turkey's perspective the KDP was trying to push PKK out of North Iraq and the KUP was getting support from the PKK which was supported by Syria and Iran. Turkey intervened on the side of the KDP and saw it as an opportunity to attack the PKK. Turkey also warned Talabani, the leader of PUK, not to cooperate with the PKK.

On May 12, 1997, Turkish forces launched Operation Hammer in May, in an attempt to root out the PKK from northern Iraq. The operation inflicted heavy casualties, however the organization continued to operate in northern Iraq. The Operation Hammer cost $300 million. Turkish sources claimed that nearly 3000 PKK militants were killed, with a further 132 being captured. This contrasted with 113 fatalities and 325 injured among the Turkish forces. The operation failed and PKK continued to operate from northern Iraq.

On September 25, 1997, Turkish forces engaged with Operation Dawn (1997) in northern Iraq. This time they were allied with the KDP and attacked PUK and PKK positions in an attempt to force a cease-fire between the factions and destroy PKK camps. The operation resulted in heavy PKK and Turkish casualties, but Turkey once again failed to root out the PKK from northern Iraq. However, a cease-fire was negotiated between the PUK and KDP.

Despite the cease-fire, renewed small fighting broke out along the armistice line between the KDP and PUK in October and November. At the same time, Iranian and Iraqi soldiers were also clashing in border areas. In this round of fighting, 1,200 combatants were killed on both sides and 10,000 civilians fled their homes. A lasting cease-fire was finally established on November 24. Saddam's response to Turkey's help in negotiations between Iraq Kurds was shaped by increasingly assisting the organization.

According to the Turkish authorities, during the year of 1997, the 3,302 PKK operatives, of whom 484 were captured, 415 surrendered, and 303 arrested, in various operations including those in northern Iraq. During the same period, security forces lost 192 soldiers and 95 others were wounded; in addition, 49 village guards were killed and 14 wounded. Turkish military claimed it gained enough operational structure in the region to monitor organizational movements, but not control or stop them. At the same time, Turkish army involved in serious war crimes and human rights violations. Kurdish civilians were routinely executed and the PKK was blamed for their death.

=== Bombings (1998–1999) ===
The PKK began using all kind of bomb attacks, including suicide bombings in the 90's. PKK targets were carefully selected. According to Turkish authorities, large majority of bombers were selected by the organization's leadership. Turkish sources also claimed that "the ones who rejected were killed or turned over to the Turkish police". In eleven out of a total of fifteen attacks were performed by women. This showed that the PKK had very dynamic structure and was able to carry out massive attacks in very short times.

Began on June 30, 1995, and phased out on July 5, 1999, the alleged campaign of suicide attacks included fourteen incidents. Most of the attacks clustered between 1998 and 1999, non exclusive list is: November 17, 1998, December 1, 1998, December 24, 1998, April 9, 1999, and June 7, 1999. All targets were military and police bases. Despite a numerous of claims, the PKK had only taken responsibility for a few suicide bombings.

=== The undeclared war ===
The undeclared war was the response of Turkey to Syria for its continued assistance to PKK. In its messages about the undeclared war, Turkey claimed that it is ready to perform any necessary activity to destroy the PKK's operational bases. It ended with the capture of Öcalan and the repositioning of Turkey in relation to the Arab League by taking a new position facing Syria and Iran.

One of the first contacts with Syria about the PKK was in 1987. Turgut Özal personally conducted the negotiations. At the end, there was a protocol which however showed the differences between the countries. Syria did not even admit Öcalan was in Syria.

After the Gulf War, in April 1992, a security agreement was reached between the two states. Both countries agreed on preventing crossing, organization, training or distributing propaganda of outlawed organizations in respective countries. If an agent is captured, he will be exchanged. Marking the border between Turkey and Syria was considered. Every three months security officials were to meet and exchange information on both sides. From international policy perspective, this was the first time Syria accepted to consider the PKK as a terrorist organization. The public reaction came on November 19–20, 1993, when the Syrian state minister stated that "Öcalan and other terrorists would not be allowed". But besides these exchanges, Syria did not significantly change its attitude toward PKK.

The next development was on August 23, 1994, when Syria officially linked the water issue to the PKK in the summit between Turkey, Syria and Iran. During this summit another interesting development was the Hatay issue, which was brought to table. While the summit was going at Damascus, the PKK was building its structure in Hatay; in July 1995, it performed its first activity there, later using this province as a base to extend its activities to Adana and Mersin; the PKK was extending to the East Mediterranean. This region was one of the centers of immigration from the southeast, and also is a temporary summer work area for the southeast region. For Turkey the region was sensitive, not because of the Kurds, but because of the Arab population. Beginning late 1995, the Syrian backing of PKK operations around Hatay was perceived by Turkish governments as an active hostile threat from Syria more than from the PKK. The PKK's Hatay operations ended with the undeclared war with Syria. If the PKK's demand had passed, it would be a big step for Damascus, not just for the water issues and Hatay demands, but also because a Western country was negotiating with a banned organization. It would be a big blow to Turkey as the inability to stop the revolt in the country could end with the balkanization of the region.

After the Turkish government's decision on the undeclared war with Syria, the military received orders to develop military operational plans, including the worst scenario (regional war: Turkey against Syria, Iran and maybe Greece (1995 military agreement on airbases) and Russia). To counteract a regional war, military agreements with Israel were signed on February 24 and August 26, 1996. These agreements followed with intelligence cooperation in February 1997. Two diplomatic notes were issued during 1996. The first note was for a truck originating in Iran and carrying military equipment to the PKK in Syria. The second one was regarding Syria being a state sponsor of the PKK. Turkey delinked the two issues of water and the PKK. On December 30, 1996, Turkish National Intelligence Agency (MIT) smuggled Mustafa Duyur out of Syria. Duyur was a DHKP-C agent who was involved with the Özdemir Sabancı murder. Turkey froze relations as Damascus was harboring PKK and DHKP-C.

=== Capture of Öcalan (1999) ===
After Syria deported PKK guerrilla leader Öcalan, he passed through various European countries which caused diplomatic crises with Turkey, who sought his extradition on "terrorism" charges, including involvement in murdering Turkish soldiers, police and also civilians.

On February 15, 1999, while being transferred from the Greek embassy to Nairobi international airport, Öcalan was captured in an operation by the Turkish National Intelligence Agency (MIT) with the support of CIA. American officials admitted that US intelligence and diplomatic efforts aided in Öcalan's capture. He was then flown back to Turkey for trial. His capture led thousands of protesting Kurds to seize Greek embassies around the world.

In August 1999, Öcalan from the jail announced his second peace initiative, ordering members to refrain from armed conflict and requesting dialogue with the government of Turkey on all issues. However, in no time, multiple riots broke out throughout the world near Turkish diplomatic facilities such as Greek embassy in London between Turks and Kurds. A PKK/KADEK spokesman stated that its armed wing, The People's Defense Force, would not disband or surrender its weapons, to maintain its capability of self-defense. PKK/KADEK avowing to not lay down its arms underscores that the organization maintains its capability to carry out operations. The PKK wasn't anymore one-leader organizations, it had become a significant symbol of Kurdish cause.

== Activities in Germany ==
The PKK could count with a strong support from the Kurdish diaspora in Europe, notably from the diaspora in Germany. After sympathizers of the PKK launched a wave of arson attacks against Turkish institutions in Germany, it was declared a terrorist organization in 1993. On September 30, 1995, Damascus contacts between the high ranking German MP Heinrich Lummer of the Christian Democratic Union of Germany (CDU) and intelligence officials in Damascus. In a meeting between Lummer and Abdullah Öcalan in Damascus in 1996, Öcalan has assured Lummer that it was the PKKs aim to find a peaceful solution for their activities in Germany. The PKK also demanded that it should be recognized as a legitimate entity and not as a terrorist organization in Germany, a demand to which Germany did not accede to. In October 1997, Eva Juhnke a German guerrilla fighter from the armed wing of organization was captured during a military operation by KDP forces in North Iraq. KDP extradited this operative to Turkey.

== 2000–2025 ==
Turkey decided that the termination of PKK could only be achieved by termination of their operational grounds. Turkey engaged with strong foreign relations campaign to get international support. On April 2, 2004, The Council of the European Union (the 15 EU governments) decided to update the European Union list of terrorist organisations to include Kurdistan Workers' Party. This applied to all and any members joining the EU. Turkey also reached an agreement with Tehran in 2002 in which Turkey recognized the Iranian rebel group Mujahideen-e-Khalq as a terrorist organisation in exchange for Iran doing the same for the PKK. However, as of 2008, Russia did not list the organization as a terrorist group despite a numerous of attempts by Turkey.

Turkey argued that the Netherlands and Belgium supported the organization by allowing training camps to function in their territories. On November 22, 1998, Hanover's police reported that three children had been among dozens of trained by the PKK in the Netherlands and Belgium. The Dutch police raided the 'PKK paramilitary camp/office' in the Dutch town of Liempde and arrested 29 people in November 2004.

Despite all efforts, Turkey wasn't even able to reduce PKK activities.

=== The changing names ===
From April 2, 2002, to November 11, 2003, the same day as the European Union updated its list of terrorists, the organization declared that it terminated "Kurdistan Workers Party" and with the same organisational structure formed the Turkish: Kürdistan Demokratik ve Özgürlük Kongresi (KADEK). The name change to KADEK was claimed as a move towards peaceful politics and co-operation with a wider range of ideologies, but it was pointed that this change was aimed to protect itself from the legal implications of being listed as a terrorist organization. Turkey claimed at the time that KADEK and PKK were identical. Later nations updated their status towards KADEK to be identical to their status towards PKK. From November 11, 2003, to April 4, 2005, the KADEK changed its name and operated under the banner of KGK (KONGRA-GEL). In 2004, the armed wing of PKK, HPG (People's Forces of Defence) announced an end to the unilateral truce they had sustained since the time of Öcalan's capture.

Later in 2004, from request of Turkey, US Treasury amended its regulations to include all the aliases and offshoots of the PKK in its sanctions list maintained by OFAC (Office of Foreign Assets Control). The list aims at blocking terrorist property. The organisations currently listed under PKK aliases include KADEK (Congress for Freedom and Democracy in Kurdistan), KONGRA-GEL, HSK, KHK and PKK.

=== Changes in financial structure ===
Turkish authorities claimed that the organization's main sources of financing shifted from state sources to mostly the Kurds in Europe and revenue derived from drug trafficking. Scholars critical of the PKK in 2007 cited one British intelligence estimate that claims the PKK controls around 40 per cent of the total amount of heroin entering Europe from the east. However, most experts disagreed with rumors that the PKK had involved in drug trafficking. The Federal Office for the Protection of the Constitution, Germany's domestic security agency, revealed in its annual report that despite claims of Turkish authorities and US designation, there is no single evidence that the PKK has involved in drug trafficking.

It is known that the group's main source is its supporters in Turkey, Iraq, Iran and Russia. Russia hasn't listed the PKK as a terrorist organization, thus allowing it to operate in Russian soil.

On March 11, 2007, statement by Deputy Chief of General Staff General Ergin Saygun stated that the organization gathers some US$615–770 million annually from its supporters, whereas a 2007 NATO Terrorist Threat Intelligence Unit report puts the number at a more modest US$50–100 million annually.

=== Democratization and elections ===
The organization claimed that it has plans to move towards peaceful politics and co-operation with a wider range of ideologies if Turkey accepts Kurdish rights.

On 17 July 2005, a prominent member of the PKK, Hasan Özen who left the organization, was murdered in Austria. In Diyarbakir, on 6 July 2005, unknowns killed Hikmet Fidan, the former vice-president of the People's Democratic Party (HADEP), who formed an alternative organization to the PKK called PWD with Osman Ocalan. The PKK was accused, but it denied its involvement.

In 2007 the PKK included a 40% quota for women as commanders.

During the 2007 Turkish general election, Turkish authorities claimed that a death threat was mailed by organization to CHP, MHP, DYP and AKP to withdraw their Van and Hakkâri candidates allowing a DTP dominance.

With the exception of DTP all candidates in Van and Hakkari from CHP, MHP, DYP and AKP must withdraw themselves and offer their support to Kurdish people. Our people must demonstrate their Kurdishness in the elections. If any different approach develops, our approach will also be different. [...] Whoever continues the activities we mentioned here will be punished. Whoever damages our movement or our party [DTP] will not be forgiven in any way. They should know that they are facing death.

The organization denied that it had ever sent such a threat.

Turkey had been condemned by the ECHR for arresting, killing and torturing Kurdish politicians.

=== Armed conflicts ===
According to Turkish claims, during the period 2003–2005 there were 246 security personnel casualties including 21 police and 22 village guards. The total number of wounded and disabled was 147. The total armed militants captured was 1325, of which 359 were dead, 377 live, and 589 through an amnesty granted through this period, of which 116 were "exchange of criminals" with Iran, Iraq, Syria, Greece, Azerbaijan and Ukraine. The TBMM expected to have an increase in the number of militants captured through exchange of criminals, as part of the global fight on Terror. The period also saw an increase in exchange of criminal intelligence.

The PKK has seen Turkish claims about their casualties as a "joke" and accused the government of hiding its casualties. In 2016, the PKK had captured more than 26 Turkish soldiers.

Despite all efforts, the Turkish government has failed to bring down the organization. The PKK has been able to operate in many countries where it hasn't been banned, such as Russia, China, India and Egypt.

=== Cease-fire and renewed conflict ===
On 13 April 2009, the PKK declared a cease fire after the DTP won 99 municipalities and negotiations were spoken about. The AKP first spoke of the "Kurdish Opening", then it was renamed in the "Democratic Opening" to appease nationalist interests and then the "National Unity Project."

On 21 October 2011 Iranian foreign minister Ali Akbar Salehi announced Iran would co-operate with Turkey in some military operations against the PKK.

2012 was the most violent year in the armed conflict between the Turkish State and PKK since 1999. At least 541 individuals lost their lives as a result of the clashes including 316 militants and 282 soldiers. In contrast, 152 individuals lost their lives in 2009 until the Turkish government initiated negotiations with the PKK leadership. The failure of this negotiations contributed to violence that were particularly intensified in 2012. The PKK encouraged by the rising power of the Syrian Kurds increased its attacks in the same year.

During the Syrian Civil War, the Kurds in Syria have established control over their own region with the help of the PKK as well as with support from the Kurdistan Regional Government in Erbil, under President Masoud Barzani.

=== 2010s ===
==== 2013–2015 peace process ====
In late 2012, the Turkish government began secret talks with Öcalan for a ceasefire. To facilitate talks, government officials transmitted letters between Öcalan in jail to PKK leaders in northern Iraq. On 21 March 2013, a ceasefire was announced. On 25 April, it was announced that the PKK would leave Turkey. Commander Murat Karayılan remarked "As part of ongoing preparations, the withdrawal will begin on May 8, 2013. Our forces will use their right to retaliate in the event of an attack, operation or bombing against our withdrawing guerrilla forces and the withdrawal will immediately stop." The semi-autonomous Kurdish region of Iraq welcomed the idea of refugees from its northern neighbor. The BDP held meetings across the region to state the pending withdrawal to concerned citizens. "The 8th of May is a day we both anticipate and fear," said party leader Pinar Yilmaz. "We don't trust the government at all. Many people here are afraid that once the guerrillas are gone, the Turkish military will crack down on us again."

The withdrawal began as planned with groups of fighters crossing the border from southeastern Turkey to northern Iraq. Iraqi leadership in Baghdad, however, declared that it would not accept armed groups into its territory. "The Iraqi government welcomes any political and peaceful settlement", read an official statement. "[But] it does not accept the entry of armed groups to its territories that can be used to harm Iraq's security and stability." The prospect of armed Kurdish forces in northern Iraq threatens to increase tensions between the region and Baghdad who are already at odds over certain oil producing territory. PKK spokesman Ahmet Deniz sought to ease concerns stating the plan would boost democracy. "The [peace] process is not aimed against anyone," he said "and there is no need for concerns that the struggle will take on another format and pose a threat to others."

It is estimated that between 1,500 and 2,000 PKK fighters resided in Turkey at the time. The withdrawal process was expected to take several months even if Iraq does not intervene to try to stop it. On 14 May 2013, the first groups of 13 male and female fighters entered Iraq's Heror area near the Metina mountain after leaving Turkey. They carried with them Kalashnikov assault rifles, light machine guns and rocket-propelled grenade launchers before a welcoming ceremony.

On 29 July 2013, the PKK issued an ultimatum in saying that the peace deal would fail if reforms were not begun to be implemented within a month. In October, Cemil Bayik warned that unless Turkey resumed the peace process, the PKK would resume operations to defend itself against it. He also criticized Turkey of waging a proxy war against Kurds during the Syrian Civil War by supporting other extremist rebels who were fighting them.

Iraqi Kurdistan President Masoud Barzani backed the initiative saying, alongside Erdogan: "This is a historic visit for me ... We all know it would have been impossible to speak here 15 or 20 years ago. Prime Minister Tayyip Erdogan has taken a very brave step towards peace. I want my Kurdish and Turkish brothers to support the peace process."

==== 2014 action against Islamic State and renewed tensions in Turkey ====
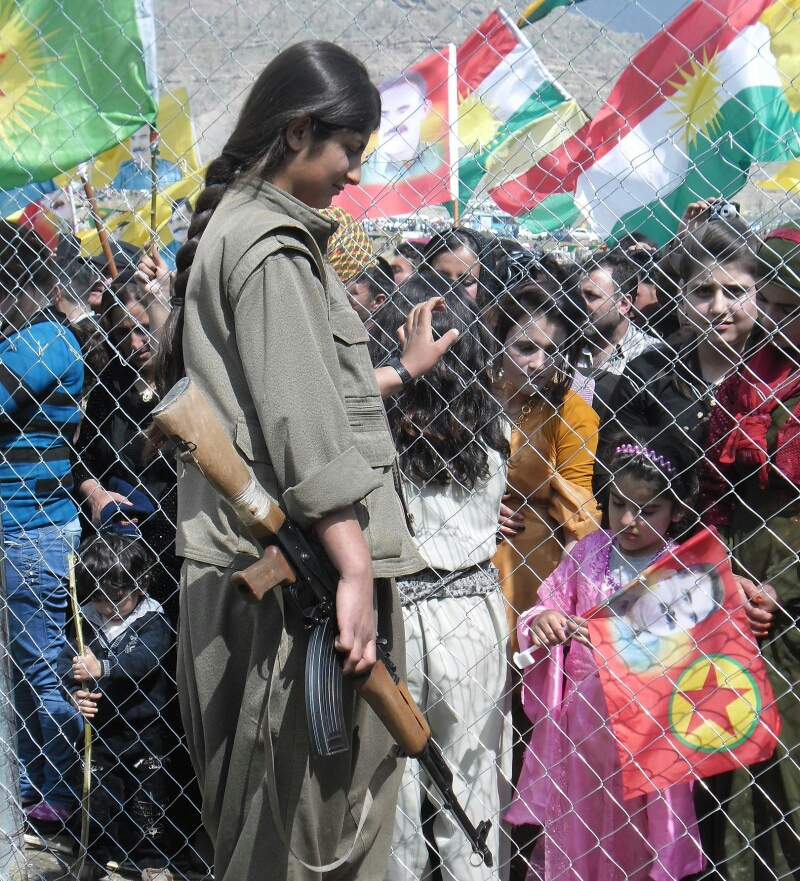
A Kurdish PKK guerrilla in 2014.

The PKK engaged the Islamic State of Iraq and the Levant (ISIL) forces in Syria in mid-July 2014 as part of the Syrian Civil War. In August the PKK engaged IS in Northern Iraq and pressured the Government of Turkey to take a stand against IS. PKK forces helped tens of thousands of Yazidis escape an encircled Mount Sinjar. In September 2014, during the Siege of Kobanî, some PKK fighters engaged with Islamic State forces in Syria who were attacking Kurdish city Kobane, which resulted in conflicts with Turks on the border and an end to a cease-fire that had been in place over a year. The PKK said Turkey was supporting ISIS. The PKK participated in many offensives against ISIS in Iraq and Syria.

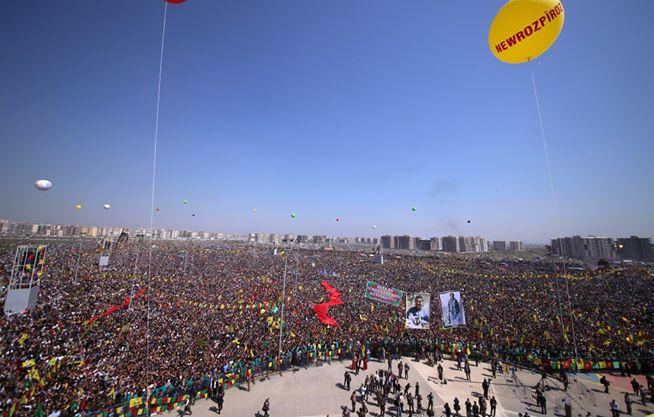
Mass demonstration for the PKK and freedom of Abdullah Ocalan in the Turkish city of Van during Newroz

A number of Turkish Kurds rallied in large-scale street protests, demanding that the government in Ankara take more forceful action to combat IS and to enable Kurdish militants already engaged against IS to more freely move and resupply. These protests included a PKK call for its supporters to turn out. Clashes between police and protesters killed at least 31 people. The Turkish government continued to restrict PKK-associated fighters' movement across its borders, arresting 260 People's Protection Units fighters who were moving back into Turkey. On 14 October, Turkish Air Force fighter-bombers attacked PKK positions in the vicinity of Daglica, Hakkari Province.

Turkish military statements stated that the bombings were in response to PKK attacks on a Turkish military outpost in the area. The Firat news agency, which Al Jazeera describes as "close to the PKK", stated that Turkish forces had been shelling the PKK positions for days beforehand and that the PKK action had itself been retaliation for those artillery strikes. The PKK had already reported several Turkish attacks against their troops months before Turkish bombing started.

==== July 2015–present: Third insurgency ====
YBS and PKK guerrillas
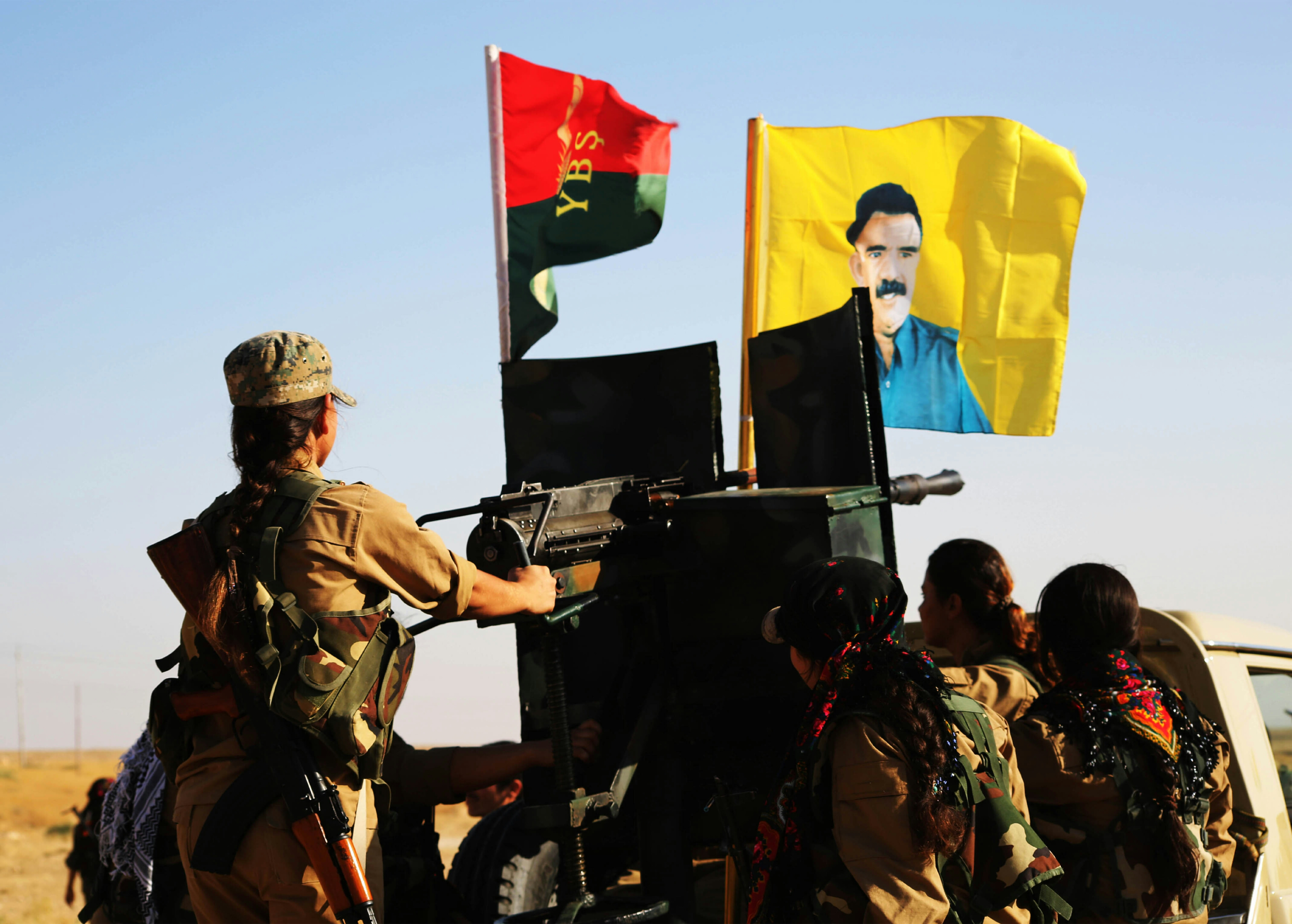
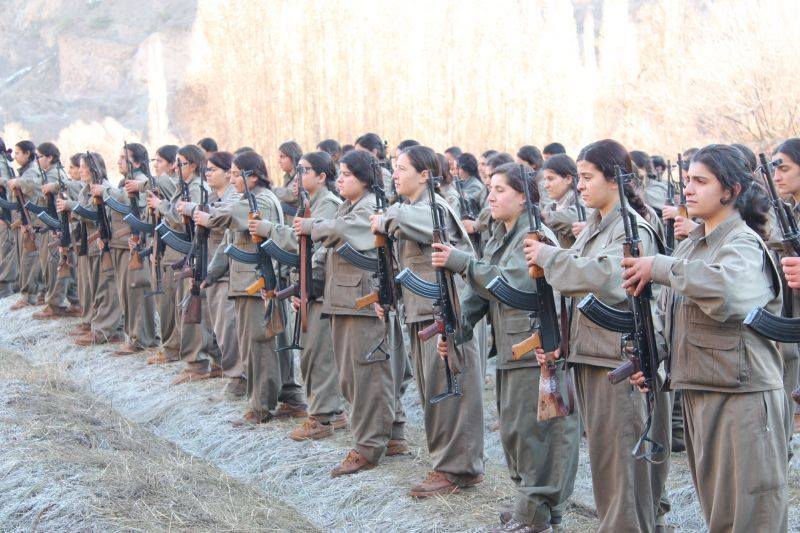
YBŞ and PKK guerillas in Northern and Southern Kurdistan in 2017

In the months before the parliamentary election of 2015, as the "Kurdish-focused" HDP's likelihood of crossing the 10% threshold for entry into the government seemed more likely, Erdogan gave speeches and made comments that repudiated the settlement process and the existence of a Kurdish problem and refusing to recognize the HDP as having any role to play despite their long participation as intermediaries. These announcements increased distrust of the government's good faith among Kurdish leaders. In July 2015, Turkey finally became involved in the war against ISIL. While they were doing so, they decided to bomb PKK targets in Iraq. The bombings came a few days after PKK was suspected of assassinating two Turkish police officers in Ceylanpınar, Şanlıurfa, criticized by the PKK of having links with ISIS after the 2015 Suruç bombing. The PKK has blamed Turkey for breaking the truce by bombing the PKK in 2014 and 2015 continuously.

In August 2015, the PKK announced that they would accept another ceasefire with Turkey only under US guarantees. PKK announced a one-sided ceasefire in October 2015 near election time, but the government refused. The leadership of Iraqi Kurdistan has condemned the Turkish airstrikes in its autonomous region in the north of Iraq.

The number of casualties since 23 July was stated by Turkish government to be 150 Turkish officers and over 2,000 Kurdish rebels killed (by September). In December 2015, Turkish military operation in southeastern Turkey has killed hundreds of civilians, displaced hundreds of thousands and caused massive destruction in residential areas.

In March 2016, the PKK helped to launch the Peoples' United Revolutionary Movement with nine other Kurdish and Turkish revolutionary leftist, socialist and communist groups (including the TKP/ML, THKP-C/M
