= Sinjar clashes =

- 2017 Sinjar clashes
- 2019 Sinjar clashes
- 2022 Sinjar clashes
