= PKK insurgency in the Kurdistan Region =

Conflict between the semi-autonomous Kurdistan Region and the Kurdistan Workers' Party

PKK insurgency in Iraqi Kurdistan
- Part of the Kurdistan Workers' Party insurgency, Iraqi Kurdish Civil War and the Iran–Turkey proxy conflict
Date	1983–2025
Location	Kurdistan Region
Result	Inconclusive: PKK announces plans to dissolve on 12 May 2025 as part of the 2025 PKK–Turkey peace process

Belligerents
Kurdistan Region; (Kurdistan Region) Peshmerga; KDP; PUK (sometimes; after 1991); Supported by: Turkey; United States; Iraq; ENKS; KDP-S; Peshmerga Rojava	KCK; PKK (until 2025); HPG; YJA-STAR; YDG-H; YPS; YPS-Jin; PÇDK (until 2015); PUK (until 1991); YBŞ; YJÊ; PJAK; YRK; (Democratic Autonomous Administration of North and East Syria) DAANES; SDF; PYD; Supported by: Iran; Hezbollah; Ba'athist Syria (against Turkey); Ba'athist Iraq (against Turkey)

Commanders and leaders
(Kurdistan Region) Masoud Barzani; (Kurdistan Region) Nechirvan Barzani; (Kurdistan Region) Shoresh Ismail Abdullah; (Kurdistan Region) Jalal Talabani (after 1991); (Kurdistan Region) Vian Dakhil; (Kurdistan Region) Haydar Shesho	Murat Karayılan; Bahoz Erdal; Cemil Bayık; Duran Kalkan; Mustafa Karasu; Former commanders: Abdullah Öcalan (surrendered); Osman Öcalan; Ibrahim Parlak; Şemdin Sakık (surrendered); Ali Haydar Kaytan †; Jalal Talabani (until 1991)

The PKK insurgency in the Kurdistan Region refers to a series of clashes in Iraqi Kurdistan between the ruling Kurdistan Region and the Kurdistan Workers' Party (PKK) and its allied groups. The conflict started in 1983. Simultaneously, the PKK waged a guerrilla insurgency, while the Peshmerga waged a counterinsurgency.

== History ==
When the PKK was founded in 1978, its actions were limited to Turkey. However, the 1980 coup caused the PKK to flee to Syria and Iraq, what is now the Kurdistan Region. Initially, the PKK was welcomed by the KDP. However, their relations worsened when the PKK began demanding governance in the Kurdistan Regional Government and more territorial control as it kept fighting Turkey and wanted more influence in the Kurdistan Region. In July 1983, the PKK and KDP had signed an accord agreeing upon unity to fight imperialism, with American imperialism being at the top of the list, as the United States supported Saddam Hussein at the time, and was considered an enemy by Kurdish nationalists. The relations of the PKK and KDP gradually worsened, and by 1988, they had fully cut ties, and the PKK shifted to the PUK. In 1989, the PUK warned Turkey that if it intervened in the Kurdistan Region again without permission, the PUK would overtly support the PKK. However, by 1990, Öcalan considered his relations with the PUK as "null and void".

By 1988, the PUK had joined the KDP in creating the Iraqi Kurdistan Front (IKF). In 1991, the IKF declared war on the PKK. Jalal Talabani began crediting Turkey with having saved the Kurds from Saddam Hussein, stating that "Turkey must be considered a country friendly to the Kurds", going as far as recommending that Turkey annex Iraqi Kurdistan. Süleyman Demirel referred to him as "my dear brother Talabani". The alliance between the PUK and KDP did not last long, and the Iraqi Kurdish Civil War erupted. Iran, Turkey, Iraq, and the United States were drawn into the fighting. On good terms with the PUK, the PKK began attacking the KDP. The PKK moved to the Qandil Mountains after the war. The worst fighting had started on October 13, 1997. Turkey backed the KDP, while Iran backed the PUK and PKK. Turkey even intervened on the side of the KDP and saw it as an opportunity to attack the PKK. Turkey also warned the PUK to stop cooperating with the PKK. On September 25, 1997, Turkish forces launched Operation Dawn. The operation resulted in heavy PKK and Turkish casualties, but Turkey again failed to expel the PKK. A cease-fire was negotiated between the PUK and KDP, after which the PUK began opposing the PKK. During the civil war, the KDP effectively pushed the PKK out of many areas in Duhok Governorate, and had "crushed in a few short months an organization that Turkey had been unable to in more than eleven years of warfare." Talabani, during the Iraq War, gave the PKK another ultimatum to "disarm or leave Iraq".

Abdullah Öcalan claimed that the KDP were merely "primitive nationalist forces", while the PKK were "revolutionary patriots". He regularly criticized the KDP for being "nationalist". Abdullah Öcalan claimed that the KDP had a role in forming the village guard system. Öcalan claimed that Masoud Barzani was a traitor for having good ties with Turkey, while Barzani claimed that "it is high treason to aim weapons at the legitimate Kurdish administration", and doing so had "confirmed Öcalan is the enemy of the Kurds." Barzani also claimed that the KDP "had not asked for any Turkish assistance despite the Turkish government's offer. We are committed to safeguarding only our people's security and not that of others." However, he also stated that "we respect relations with all neighbors and we do not permit that their security be threatened from our territory."

The United States and Turkey have both collaborated with the KRG against the PKK on many occasions.

Saddam Hussein, who had openly supported the PKK-allied PJAK in the past, had also allegedly supported the PKK too. In a speech, Saddam Hussein had indicated his sentiments by stating "curse the father of Turkey as much as the father of Iran." A spokesman for the Iraqi Foreign Ministry described the PKK as a "tragic legacy from the Saddam regime" A Duhok politician also accused the PKK of "continuing Saddam Hussein's policy".

After Abdullah Öcalan's arrest, he expressed his anger with Masoud Barzani and Jalal Talabani, especially with Barzani, and he called on the PKK to overthrow the Kurdistan Regional Government and kill Barzani and Talabani, whom he referred to as "dogs" and stated "lets not let Barzani and Talabani breathe."

In 2000, the PKK and PUK had a major battle. The PKK withdrew from the cities and was active only in rural areas doing ambushes. On 3 separate occasions on July 29, 2015, October 28, 2020, and January 18, 2022, the PKK attacked the Kirkuk–Ceyhan Oil Pipeline. In 2014, the Peshmerga abandoned a piece of land on the mountains of Zini Warte in Erbil. The PKK took that piece of land, and the Peshmerga was sent to the area in 2020. The KDP argued it only left the area to fight the Islamic State in the south, but the standoff was eventually resolved by the KDP withdrawing its forces. Masoud Barzani accused the PKK of taking advantage of the Peshmerga's conflict with ISIS in order to "invade" parts of the Kurdistan Region bordering Turkey, "instead of supporting the Kurdistan Region project." On June 5, 2021, the PKK ambushed 5 Peshmerga soldiers in Duhok, killing them. According to the KRG, the PKK had occupied 515 villages in the Kurdistan Region in 2015. Of these, 304 come under Duhok province, while 177 were in Erbil and 34 in Sulaymaniyah. In a statement on February 27, 2021, Masoud Barzani emphasized that the Kurdish authorities could not rebuild 800 villages because of the PKK, adding they would not tolerate the group's presence in the region.

On May 20, 2014, the KDP arrested many PÇDK members during operations in Erbil, Duhok, and Zakho. A few days before the operation, the Kurdistan Regional Government banned the PÇDK after they protested in front of the Kurdistan Region Parliament to commemorate a massacre of PKK members by the KDP in Erbil in 1997, during the Iraqi Kurdish Civil War.

During the 2017 Sinjar clashes, the KDP-backed Peshmerga Roj clashed with the PKK-backed YBŞ. During the 2022 Sinjar clashes, the KRG and the PKK backed different sides.

Adham Barzani criticised the KDP for its ties with Turkey, and opposed Turkish military presence in the Kurdistan Region. He stated that "whenever Turkey has occupied a piece of territory, it has never withdrawn from it", and demanded Turkey to keep its conflict with the PKK inside Turkish borders.

Vian Dakhil, a Yazidi KDP politician, also advocated for the expulsion of the PKK from Sinjar, claiming that the presence of the PKK and its allied groups were the biggest problem for the Yazidi community. Haydar Shesho, the leader of the HPÊ, called on the PKK to withdraw from Yazidi communities, while also calling on Turkey to respect the territorial integrity of Iraq. Haydar Shesho also claimed that the PKK was complicit in the Yazidi genocide but also took credit for having saved the Yazidis. He claimed that the PKK served Turkish interests and was used by Turkey as an excuse to attack civilians. He also accused the PKK of harshly persecuting Syrian Kurds and ruling with authoritarianism in the Democratic Autonomous Administration of North and East Syria.

In 2022, the Deputy Minister of Peshmerga, Sarbast Lazgin released a statement to the Kurdistan 24 channel, saying that "some of Iraq's PMF, the Government of Syria, and the Lebanese Hezbollah are allied with PKK, they support each other and work together toward the same goals. This alliance has an open route all the way from Syria, through Sinjar, Mosul, Kirkuk, and to Iran, which is under control of PMF, The PKK has military bases near Chamchamal District, Sulaymaniyah Governorate, from where they cooperate with the groups that launch rockets on Erbil, We, the KRG, have repeatedly called on the PKK to stop its armed operations in the Kurdistan Region." He also stated that the PKK fighting has no impact on Turkey, and all it does is drag the Turkish Army deeper into the Kurdistan Region. Jotiar Adil, the official spokesman of the Kurdistan Region, stated that "we ask all foreign military groups, including the PKK, to not drag the Kurdistan Region into any kind of conflicts or tensions, the PKK are the main reason that pushed Turkey to enter our territories in the Kurdistan Region. Therefore, we think the PKK should leave, we are not a side in this long-standing conflict and we have no plans to be on any side."

A representative of the Kurdistan Regional Government to the Iraqi Armed Forces, Command General Abdul-Khaliq Talaat, stated that “Sinjar will not be stable as long as the PKK and the other outlawed armed militias stay there" and he called on the Iraqi government to work with the KRG in order to remove the PKK.

On February 23, 2025, residents of the village of Guherz demanded both Turkey and the PKK to leave the village and all of Iraqi Kurdistan.

== See also ==
- Turkish and Iranian anti-PKK operations in Iraq
  - List of Turkish operations in northern Iraq
  - Turkish occupation of Iraqi Kurdistan
- Intra-Kurdish violence
  - Iraqi Kurdish Civil War
  - KDPI–Komala conflict
