= 2005 Recep Tayyip Erdoğan speech in Diyarbakır =

2005 speech of Turkish Prime Minister on Kurdish issue

On 12 August 2005, Prime Minister of Turkey Recep Tayyip Erdoğan delivered a speech on the subject of the Kurdish issue in Diyarbakır, the largest Kurdish-majority city in Turkey. The speech is characterized by being the most liberal discourse ever at the time conducted by a Turkish head of government on this issue. In the speech, the prime minister conceded that the Turkish state had made mistakes in the past, used the term “the Kurdish question” and vowed to settle it through more democracy, more citizenship law, and more prosperity. The speech was considered "historic" and "groundbreaking" in Turkey. The speech also faced heavy criticism by Turkish commentators and the main opposition party CHP, for putting the unity of Turkey in danger.

== Background ==
=== Context ===
The war in southeast Turkey has taken over 30,000 lives and resulted in a large number of internally displaced persons since the 1980s. It has also made the region's economy one of the poorest of the country. Turkey's estimated 14 million Kurds had been labeled "mountain Turks" by government officials in the past. Until the early 1990s, their language, which is distinct from Turkish, was legally prohibited. Thousands of Kurdish activists were tortured or imprisoned for demanding formal acknowledgement of their ethnic identity.

Turkey had begun to ease pressure on the Kurdish population as part of its bid to join the European Union. Erdoğan's centre-right Justice and Development Party (AKP) had enacted a series of sweeping reforms since taking office in 2002. The reforms influenced European Union leaders' decision to commence membership negotiations, which were scheduled to begin in October 2005.

=== Expectations ===
The AKP's attitude towards the Kurdish issue was initially outlined in the party's 2001 program. The AKP followed in the footsteps of the preceding major parties' approaches to the Kurdish issue while also departing from them. The AKP, like the other previous major parties, would interpret the Kurdish situation according its program in terms of "terrorism," "foreign provocation," and "underdevelopment." However, the party program also acknowledged that economic development alone would not be sufficient to overcome the issue, and urged that Turkish citizens be recognized for their cultural uniqueness. Furthermore, it proposed that citizenship be viewed as the primary source of national identity. This was crucial as all prominent political parties and Turkey's three constitutions had defined national identity in terms of Turkishness. However, despite the fact that the AKP program acknowledged that past measures would not settle the "Kurdish question," the issue was not included in the policies of the first two AKP governments. The AKP has even denied the issue in some instances. For instance, Erdoğan claimed on a visit to Moscow in December 2002 that there was no such thing as a Kurdish question.

== Speech ==
In the speech, Erdoğan told the crowd that the government would "resolve all problems with more democracy, more civil rights and more prosperity". He also made reference to the existence of a "Kurdish problem", which Ankara governments had denied for long, along with admitting "past mistakes".

Every country has been through difficult times in its history. A great state and a great country like Turkey has overcome many difficulties in reaching today. Therefore, refusing to acknowledge past mistakes is not appropriate for great countries. A great state and a strong nation look to the future with confidence by confessing their mistakes and their failures, and with this principle in mind, our government serves the country. The Kurdish problem is not the problem of a part of our people, but the problem of everyone, thus also my problem. We will solve every problem with more democracy, more civil rights and prosperity, respecting the constitutional order, the principle of the republic and the fundamental principles that we have inherited from the founding fathers of our country.

Thereafter, Erdoğan explained the three ideologies he opposes:

- ethnic nationalism;
- regional nationalism;
- religious nationalism.

There are many ethnic groups in our country. We do not distinguish between them. They each have their own identity. There is a bond that unites all of us, and this bond is the citizenship of the Republic of Turkey. Turkey is Ankara, Istanbul, Konya, Samsun, Erzurum and Diyarbakır, and I want you to know that the scents, colors, voices, music in every place of this country have their own unique taste.

== Reactions ==
Los Angeles Times and BBC reported that Erdoğan's speech received strong praise from the Kurdish community.

=== Opposition reaction ===
Erdoğan's speech was heavily criticized by Turkey's main opposition grouping, the Republican People's Party (CHP), and by many Turkish commentators. Deniz Baykal, the leader of CHP, said that “the changes made in the name of democracy will lead to Turkey's dismemberment”. CHP Vice Chairman Onur Öymen said that "He [Erdoğan] gave the wrong impression to the people and the terrorists. This has nothing to do with democracy and human rights. Terrorism exists in many countries, such as Spain, which can hardly be accused of not having enough democracy."

The speech of Erdoğan was warmly welcomed by local politicians, such as Diyarbakır Mayor Osman Baydemir of the pro-Kurdish Democratic People's Party (DEHAP). He said: "I hope his pledges will lead to the opening of a new page." At the same time, over 70 unions, chambers of commerce and professional associations in Diyarbakır published a joint declaration of support for the prime minister's speech, as did a group of 50 ethnic Kurdish artists and intellectuals.

Şerafettin Elçi, a veteran Kurdish politician, said that “The challenge facing Erdoğan is to strike a balance between the demands of the military and his nationalist constituents on the one hand and those of the European Union and the Kurds on the other. It's a very, very fine line.”

=== Critical reception ===
The Economist called the speech a "landmark" in Turkish politics, while Al Jazeera called the speech "groundbreaking".

== Aftermath ==
The prime minister's remarks were quickly followed by a succession of events. Kurdish artists began to record new songs, writers began to publish books in Kurdish, and several newspapers were granted permission to publish in Kurdish. Following the speech, DEHAP stated a few days later that it was merging with the other pro-Kurdish group, the Democratic Society Movement (DTH). The newly formed organization then demanded from the PKK to end its armed activities. The PKK stated the next day that it will observe a month-long truce until 20 September. Nonetheless, the PKK's attacks continued. Not only were there more conflicts between the PKK and the army, there was also more tension between citizens and Turkish security personnel.

It was determined during a meeting of the National Security Council in 2007 to get in touch with PKK and propose certain changes addressing citizens' cultural rights. Following the visits of Turkish officials to Masoud Barzani, president of the Kurdistan Regional Government (KRG), began a series of formal interactions with the KRG, leading to a major improvement in Ankara-Erbil ties Turkey's decades-long policy of containment of the Kurds of Iraq was now over. Not long after, state officials also contacted the PKK and had consecutive meetings (Oslo talks). A year later, the public broadcasting agency, TRT, launched for the first time a 24-hour Kurdish language channel, TRT Kurdî. Also, the Council of Higher Education (YÖK) allowed Kurdish language and literature departments in universities. These developments were followed by the inception of the so-called “Kurdish opening”.

== See also ==
- Democratic initiative
- 2013–2015 PKK–Turkey peace process
