= 2009–2010 Kurdistan Workers' Party ceasefire =

Ceasefire in the Turkish-Kurdish conflict

The Kurdistan Workers' Party (PKK) announced a ceasefire on 13 April 2009, declaring they would only retaliate in self-defense. The ceasefire was encouraged by the electoral success of the Democratic Society Party (DTP) in the municipal elections of 2009. Then in May 2009, the president of the Kurdistan Communities Union (KCK) Murat Karayilan released a statement supportive of an eventual peace process. Later, the PKK prolonged the ceasefire on 1 June until 15 July 2009. On 15 July the DTP organized a manifestation in support of a peace process which was attended by tens of thousands of people in Diyarbakir, and the PKK again prolonged their ceasefire until 1 September 2009. The Human Rights Association (IHD), Freedom and Solidarity Party and the Labour Party also supported a potential peace process.

This then made way for the Kurdish initiative (also called Kurdish Opening), which was announced on 29 July 2009 by Interior Minister Beşir Atalay and became a very discussed topic on the Turkish political agenda. President Abdullah Gül and prime Minister Recep Tayyip Erdoğan both supported the process at the time, but their approach was different, while Gül met with the DTP leader to discuss the developments, Erdoğan refused to meet with representatives of the pro-Kurdish DTP. Atalay was assigned with the coordination of the initiative and began to organize meetings with the journalists and NGOs to discuss a solution for the Kurdish Turkish conflict.

In October 2009, more than 30 members of the PKK coming from the Makhmour refugee camp in Iraqi Kurdistan, crossed the Habur border crossing and turned themselves in to the Turkish authorities in support of the Kurdish opening by the Turkish government. The militants were questioned but released, which caused an uproar in the Turkish society.

On 13 November 2009, Beşir Atalay informed the Parliament about the initiative in more detail, and faced opposition by the CHP and its leader Deniz Baykal. Baykal mentioned the project would potentially bring division to the Turkish Republic. The Turkish Government wanted to achieve an amnesty for PKK members who repented according to article 221 of the Turkish Penal Code, for which it was in need of the support of the opposition parties CHP and MHP in addition to that of the pro-Kurdish Democratic Society Party (DTP). But the project was met with opposition by the CHP and the MHP due to nationalist concerns.

On 7 December 2009 an attack killing 7 Turkish soldiers in Resadiye, Tokat occurred, for which the PKK claimed responsibility.

On 11 December 2009, the Constitutional Court voted to close the DTP for being a center of activities against the unity of the state. The closure resulted in the banning of 37 DTP members from politics for five years, including two members of parliament. Between December 2009 and February 2010 dozens of Kurdish politicians in several districts were arrested.

By June 2010, the PKK announced the cease fire was over due to the continued persecution of the Kurdish population.
