= Duran Kalkan =

Senior commander of the Kurdistan Workers' Party

- Born: 14 July 1954 (age 72); Güzelim, Tufanbeyli, Adana Province, Turkey
- Other names: Selahattin Abbas, Selahattin Erdem
- Military career
- Allegiance: Kurdistan Workers' Party (PKK)
- Service: PKK
- Service years: 1973–2025
- Rank: Senior commander
- Unit: PKK
- Known for: Senior commander of the PKK
- Conflicts: Kurdish–Turkish conflict

Duran Kalkan (born Güzelim, Tufanbeyli, Adana Province, Turkey, 14 July 1954), also known as Selahattin Abbas, or Selahattin Erdem is a found member and senior commander of the Kurdistan Workers' Party (PKK). He is wanted by both the United States Department of the Treasury and the Government of Turkey.

== Biography ==
=== Early life and education ===
Kalkan was born in Güzelim, Tufanbeyli, Adana, on 14 August 1954 to a Turkish family that had migrated from Erzurum. He attended the Adana Teachers School, going on to the Ankara University Faculty of Arts and Sciences, where it is likely he was radicalized in the intense and polarized student-politics of the time. He graduated in 1978. During this time, Kalkan was among a group around Abdullah Öcalan, Ali Haydar Kaytan and Cemîl Bayık amongst others which held regular meetings from 1973 onwards and were known as the Kurdistan Revolutionaries later on. He was shortly detained together with Öcalan and Haydar Kaytan in December 1974, as the Turkish authorities closed down the Ankara Demokratik Yüksek Öğrenim Derneği (ADYÖD).

=== Kurdistan Workers Party ===
On November 27 of 1978 in Turkey's Diyarbakir Province the founding congress of the Kurdistan Workers' Party was held, in which he initially served as a guerrilla commander. He succeeded Riza Altun as the PKK's transnational finance manager in the late 1980s and managed the organization's finances in Germany until the late 1980s. He was arrested in 1988 and prosecuted during the Kurdish trial in Düsseldorf, Germany. During pre-trial detention in Hamburg he participated in a hunger strike which lasted for 40 days. He was accused of together with Hasan Güler, to have led the European organization of the PKK and ordered the murder of Ramazan Adigüzel. The state prosecutor demanded a life sentence but he was given six years for being a leader within a terrorist organization and due to his pretrial detention he was released. After he moved to Iraqi Kurdistan, to evade arrest warrants. There he served as commander in the Arteshen Rizgariya Gelli Kurdistan (ARGK) and member of the PKK's Presidential Council, eventually becoming a member of the Executive Council of the Koma Civakên Kurdistan (KCK).

He published articles in the Özgür Gündem newspaper under the pen-name Adil Bayram, and regularly gives interviews to the press.

== Criminal charges ==
Kalkan is in the red category of the "most wanted terrorists list" published by the Ministry of Interior of the Republic of Turkey since October 28, 2015. The list contains information that Duran Kalkan was born in Adana in 1954 and is a member of the PKK/KCK organization. The Ministry announced that a monetary reward of up to 10 million Turkish liras will be given to Kalkan in this category. On 13 December 2016, the Mardin 1st Criminal Court of Peace issued a detention warrant for Kalkan and Murat Karayılan, another PKK commander, as part of an investigation into the killing of the Kaymakam of Derik, Muhammet Fatih Safitürk. In November 2018 the USA declared, that within their Reward for Justice Program they offered a bounty of 3 million US-dollars for informations that led to the capture of Duran Kalkan.

Duran Kalkan, Murat Karayılan and Cemil Bayık, the three current leaders of the PKK, are wanted by the United States Department of the Treasury and the Government of Turkey for recruiting child soldiers, engaging in drug trafficking, targeting Turkish government officials, police and security forces, and indiscriminately injuring and killing civilians.
