= 2019 Sinjar clashes =

Skirmish between Iraq and PKK forces

Sinjar clashes (2019)
Date	17 March – 21 March 2019 (4 days)
Location	Sinjar District, Iraq
Result	Ceasefire

Belligerents
Iraq; Ground Forces	Kurdistan Workers' Party (PKK); Sinjar Resistance Units (YBŞ)

Casualties and losses
2 killed	2 killed, 5 wounded
- Many injuries reported on both sides.

The Sinjar clashes (2019) refer to a conflict that took place between the Iraqi Army and Kurdistan Workers' Party-affiliated forces in the Sinjar from 17 to 21 March 2019.

== Clashes ==
Clashes between Iraqi forces and PKK-affiliated militants began in the Hasawik area of Sinun on 17 March 2019, where two Iraqi soldiers died and five YBŞ militants were wounded. The clashes broke out after the militants were denied passage through an army checkpoint and they then attempted to drive through it, driving into one soldier and shooting at the checkpoint.

The Anadolu Agency reported that additional clashes broke out on 19 March, leaving one Iraqi soldier dead. The fatal clashes took place in Om Diban area, near the Iraq–Syria border, and injuries were reported on both sides in addition to the one death. In Bab Shilo area, Iraq deployed three brigades and demanded that the YBŞ evacuate the area. The YBŞ refused to withdraw and clashes subsequently broke out.

== See also ==
- Sinjar clashes (2017)
- April 2017 Turkish airstrikes in Syria and Iraq
- Turkish strikes on Sinjar (2018)
- Sinjar clashes (2022)
