= Cemîl Bayik =

PKK military commander

- Born: 26 February 1955 (age 71); Keban, Elâzığ Province, Turkey
- Military career
- Service years: 1978–present
- Rank: Member of PKK Presidency Council; Vice-Chairman of KCK Executive Council; Former ARGK commander
- Conflicts: Kurdistan Workers' Party insurgency

Cemîl Bayik (born 26 February 1955) is one of the five founders of the Kurdistan Workers' Party (PKK), and is among the organization's top leadership. He is a member of the 12-man leadership council of the Kurdistan Communities Union (Koma Civakên Kurdistan, KCK), a Kurdish political umbrella organisation that the PKK is part of. He is also part of the three-man Executive Committee of the PKK, the leading body of the organisation, which consists of himself, acting PKK leader Murat Karayilan and Fehman Huseyin from Rojava, the PKK's commander.

== Life ==
He was a member of a group around Abdullah Öcalan, Haki Karer, Duran Kalkan, Ali Haydar Kaytan and Mazlum Doğan which from 1973 onwards held regular meetings focused on ideology and would become known as the Kurdistan Revolutionaries. In the PKK's first meeting in 1978, Bayik was appointed the Deputy Secretary General of the organization, making him the PKK's second man (after Abdullah Öcalan). Bayik, Kalkan, Kaytan and others gave the order for the beginning of the armed warfare against the Turkish Army in July 1984. Until 1995 he served as the leader of the PKK's military wing, the Artêşa Rizgariya Gelê Kurdistan (ARGK) or Peoples' Liberation Army. Bayik, Duran Kalkan, Ali Haydar Kaytan and others gave the order for the beginning of the armed insurgency against the Turkish army in July 1984. In the early nineties he was the camp director at the Mahsum Korkmaz Academy, the PKK's training camp in the Syrian-controlled Beqaa Valley in Lebanon.

After the capture of PKK leader Abdullah Öcalan, Bayik and Murat Karayilan were voted to lead the PKK. According to Turkish claims, reformist leaders such as Osman Öcalan, Nizamettin Tas (who previously backed Bayik against Osman Öcalan in a leadership struggle) and Kani Yilmaz left the organization, while Karayilan served as the acting leader of the PKK with Bayik's support.

Bayik had several times stated that the PKK is ready for peace process and made several ceasefire decisions. Bayik has stated that "the war can't solve the Kurdish-Turkish conflict in Turkey and it would have been solved long time ago if the solution process had started earlier.

Bayik is in the red category of the "most wanted terrorists" list published by the Ministry of Interior of the Republic of Turkey since 28 October 2015. The Ministry states that a reward of up to 10 million ₺ will be given to the person or persons who catch him or share information that will result in his arrest.

In November 2018, the USA declared that they are offering a bounty of US$4 M for information that would lead to the capture of Bayik.

== Controversies ==
=== Suspicions of drug trafficking ===
On 20 April 2011, at the request of Turkey, the U.S. Department of the Treasury announced the designation of PKK founders Cemîl Bayik and Duran Kalkan and other high-ranking members as Specially Designated Narcotics Traffickers (SDNT) pursuant to the Foreign Narcotics Kingpin Designation Act (Kingpin Act). Pursuant to the Kingpin Act, the designation freezes any assets the designees may have under U.S. jurisdiction and prohibits U.S. persons from conducting financial or commercial transactions with these individuals. However, years later the German Federal Office for the Protection of the Constitution says that there is no evidence that the organisational structures of the PKK are directly involved in drug trafficking in Germany.

Preceded by Mahsum Korkmaz	Military Commander of the PKK; 1986 – 1995	Succeeded by Nizamettin Taş
