= Operation Kiran =

Turkish military operation

Operation Kıran
- Part of the Kurdish–Turkish conflict (2015–present)
Date	17 August 2019 – 11 January 2020
Location	Southeastern and Eastern Anatolia regions, Turkey
Result	Operation successful: All PKK members inside the region are neutralized; 43 caves and camps belonging to PKK inside the region are destroyed

Belligerents
Turkey	Kurdistan Workers' Party (PKK)

Commanders and leaders
(Turkey) Recep Tayyip Erdogan (Turkey) Gen. Arif Çetin (General Commander of Gendarmerie) (Turkey) Maj. Gen. Nuri Öztürk (Turkey) Maj. Gen. Yavuz Özfidan (Turkey) Col. Tahsin Saruhan	Murat Karayılan

Units involved
Gendarmerie General Command: Gendarmerie Special Operations (JÖH); Village guards; General Directorate of Security: Police Special Operation Department (PÖH)	KCK: HPG; Freedom Women's Units; YDG-H; YPS

Strength
2,000	700–800

Casualties and losses
None	600+ killed

Operation Kıran (Turkish: Kıran Operasyonu) was a military operation in Turkey, conducted by Turkish security forces, including police, gendarmerie and village guards. The operation started at 17 August 2019 and was under the command of the Ministry of Interior.

== Operation timeline ==
=== Operation Kıran-1 ===
==== 17 August 2019 ====
Phase 1 was launched in three provinces including Hakkari, Şırnak and Van. In total 12 caves and shelters belonging to PKK was destroyed.

=== Operation Kıran-2 ===
==== 28 August 2019 ====
Phase 2 was launched in three provinces.

=== Operation Kıran-3 ===
==== 21 September 2019 ====
Phase 3 was launched in two provinces including Siirt and Şırnak with 2,325 security personnels. Reportedly 16 PKK members, including 2 in Turkey's wanted list, were killed, wounded or captured. 6 shelters belonging to PKK were destroyed and 4 IEDs were defused.

=== Operation Kıran-5 ===
==== 8 November 2019 ====
Phase 5 was launched in three provinces including Diyarbakır, Muş and Bingöl with 300 security personnels.

==== 9 November 2019 ====
PKK's Ağrı responsible Halis Ersayan, who was sought on Turkey's grey list with a reward of 300,000 Turkish liras ($53,000) was killed.

=== Operation Kıran-6 ===
==== 13 November 2019 ====
Phase 3 was launched in three provinces including Hakkari, Şırnak and Van with 2,360 security personnels. 1 RPG-7, 1 sniper rifle, 14 hand grenades, 34 ATGM ammunition, 18 kg TNT were seized by Turkish security forces, while 4 IEDs were defused as well.

==== 15 November 2019 ====
5 ton marijuana was seized by the police. Reportedly 2 IEDs were defused as well.

=== Operation Kıran-7 ===
==== 23 November 2019 ====
Phase 7 was launched in Tunceli Province with 2,250 security personnels.

== See also ==
- Operation Claw (2019)
- Operation Peace Spring
