= 2022 Sinjar clashes =

Clashes between Iraq and YBS forces

Sinjar clashes (2022)
- Part of Operation Claw-Lock
Date	May 1, 2022 – May 7, 2022
Location	Sinjar District, Iraq
Result	Ceasefire; YBŞ withdraws from central Sinjar

Belligerents
Iraq Supported by: Kurdistan Region; Turkey	Popular Mobilization Forces: Sinjar Resistance Units (YBŞ); Supported by: Kurdistan Workers' Party (PKK)

Casualties and losses
Unknown	Dozens killed (Iraqi claim)
- 3,000 displaced

The Sinjar clashes of 2022 were a conflict that began on May 1, when the Iraqi military, with support from Turkey and the Kurdistan Democratic Party, launched an operation to push the YBS militia of the Popular Mobilization Forces out of Sinjar.

After YBS rejected an Iraqi army request to evacuate a checkpoint in the area, the clashes began, and the main part of the clashes continued for an hour and injured two civilians, and displaced over 3,000.

== See also ==
- Sinjar clashes (2017)
- Sinjar clashes (2019)
