= Güzelim, Tufanbeyli =

Güzelim
- Neighbourhood
- Location in Turkey
- Coordinates: 38°09′N 36°12′E
- Country: Turkey
- Province: Adana
- District: Tufanbeyli
- Population (2022): 137
- Time zone: UTC+3 (TRT)

Güzelim is a neighbourhood in the municipality and district of Tufanbeyli, Adana Province, Turkey. Its population is 137 (2022).
