= 2017 Sinjar clashes =

Skirmish between Kurdish forces in northwestern Iraq

- Part of spillover of the Syrian civil war and the PKK insurgency in Iraqi Kurdistan
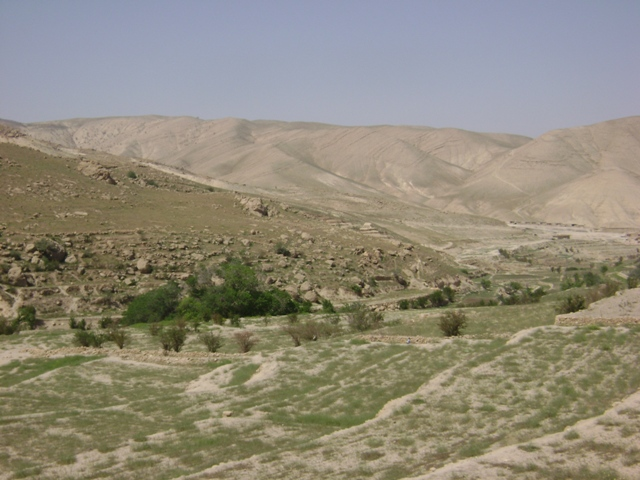
- Fallow terrace fields in the Sinjar Mountains
| Date | 3 March 2017 (1 day) |
| Location | Khanasor, Nineveh Province, Iraq |
| Result | Ceasefire |

Belligerents
| Kurdish National Council; Supported by: Kurdistan Democratic Party | Sinjar Resistance Units; Êzîdxan Women's Units; PKK; HPG |

Commanders and leaders
| Unknown | Zardasht Shingali; Rosyar Vejin |

Units involved
| Rojava Peshmerga | Asayîşa Êzîdxanê |

Strength
| ~500 fighters, 30 Humvees (YBŞ claim) | Unknown |

Casualties and losses
| Unknown number killed, ~12 wounded (local reports) "dozens" killed, "dozens" surrendered, 4 captured (pro-PKK claim) | 5 killed, 20 wounded, 5 captured 2 killed |
- Several civilians killed ~10,200 displaced

On 3 March 2017, clashes occurred between pro-PKK forces, namely the Sinjar Resistance Units (YBŞ) and the Êzîdxan Women's Units (YJÊ), and the Rojava Peshmerga that serve as the Kurdish National Council's paramilitary wing. After KNC forces entered the town of Khanasor in the Iraqi Sinjar Mountains, fighting broke out among unclear circumstances, resulting in dozens of casualties.

The clashes have widely been seen as symptomatic for the high tensions among the forces that fight against the Islamic State of Iraq and the Levant (ISIL) around Sinjar, and the risk that these tensions could escalate into turf wars, which would degrade any attempts to drive the extremist group from the region for good.

== Background ==
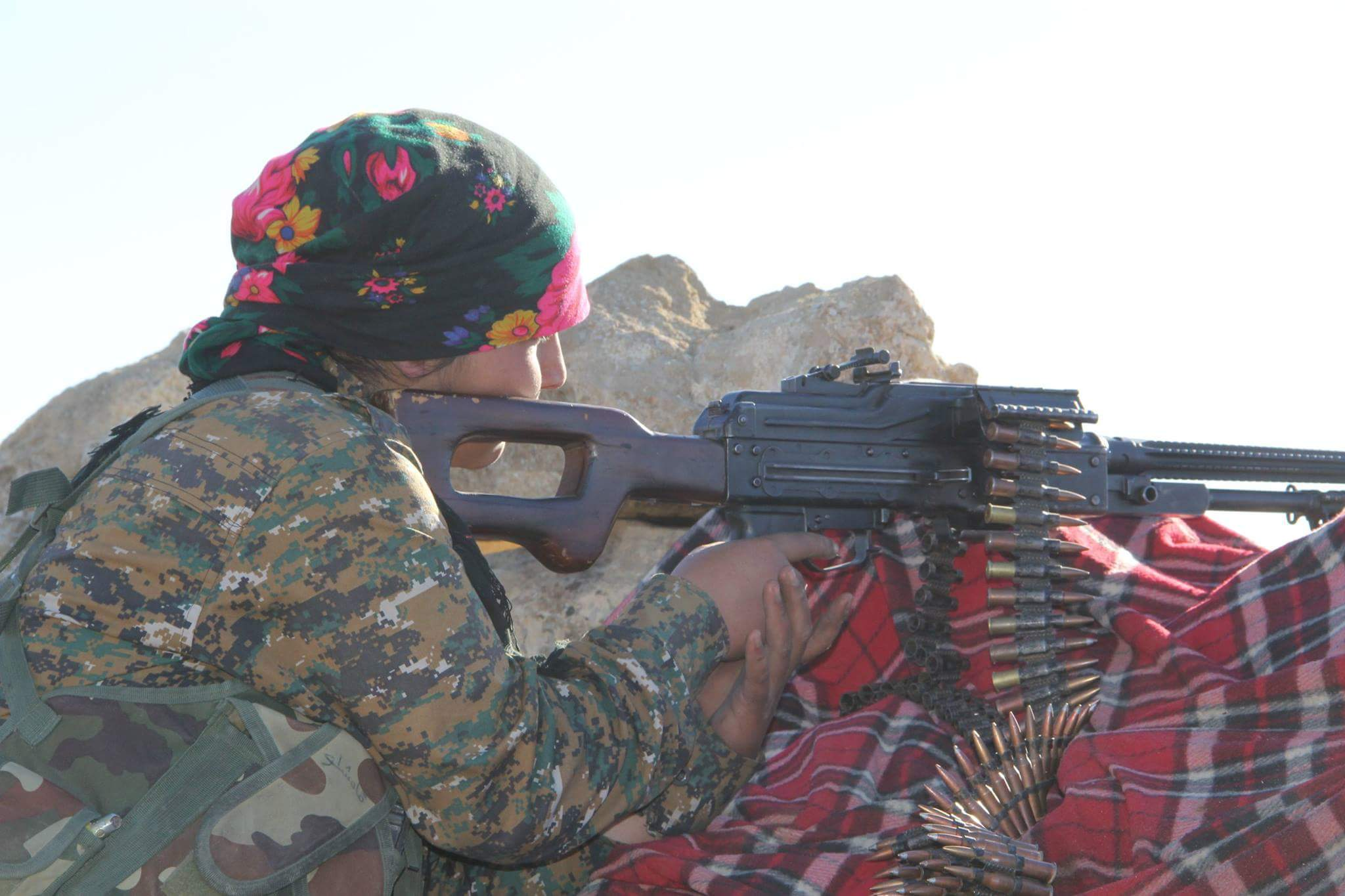
A YJÊ fighter in 2016. YBŞ and YJÊ were organised and trained by the PKK, resulting in their conflict with the Kurdistan Democratic Party.

When ISIL invaded the Sinjar Mountains in 2014 and began to massacre its Yezidi population, the PKK intervened with hundreds of fighters in order to save the locals from the Islamic State militants. Since then, the PKK set up two local Yezidi self-defense groups, namely the Sinjar Resistance Units and the Êzîdxan Women's Units. In late 2015, anti-ISIL forces finally succeeded in driving the Islamic State mostly from the Sinjar area, but the PKK fighters have since refused to leave and continue to train and equip the local PKK-affiliated militias. This has caused resentment among the Kurdistan Democratic Party (KDP), which regards Sinjar as part of Iraqi Kurdistan and sees the PKK as local political rival.

The KDP believes that the presence of the PKK in Sinjar is illegal, and that their own Peshmerga forces are the only legitimate security force of the area. The Rojava Peshmerga are Syrian Kurdish fighters affiliated with the KNC, which in turn was set up by the KDP, and effectively operate as part of the KDP's regular armed forces.

== Clashes ==
On 2 March, the Rojava Peshmerga stated that they would relocate to the Syrian border near al-Hawl in order to stop smuggling operations, but as they moved further south into the Sinjar Mountains, they came into conflict with the Sinjar Resistance Units at Khanasor. The KNC forces later claimed that they had been blocked by the YBŞ while simply passing through the area, while the YBŞ in turn argued that the Rojava Peshmerga had attempted to occupy Khanasor on the orders of Turkey and the Kurdistan Democratic Party.

On the next morning, heavy fighting broke out in Khanasor. Both sides later accused each other of having initiated the battle: Whereas the YBŞ said that they had peacefully asked the KNC fighters to leave the town, whereupon the latter attacked them with heavy weapons, the Rojava Peshmerga stated that they were first shot at and decided to take a stand rather than simply retreat. In any case, heavy clashes broke out, during which several fighters were killed or wounded, and several civilians also became casualties. Local officials reported the violence displaced around 10,200 people.

On 4 March, a ceasefire had come into effect, with PKK-affiliated groups and the KNC negotiating a solution of the conflict, though pro-PKK media claimed that the peshmerga prepared a new attack on Khanasor.

== Reactions ==
Pro-PKK media claimed that the fighting was the result of a Turkish attempt to "turn the Southern Kurdistan territory into a battle field, starting from Shingal, and thus to invade this territory". According to this view, the Rojava Peshmerga were proxies of the Turkish MIT, hostile to both the PKK as well as the Yezidis. The YBŞ also claimed that they enjoyed the full support of the local population, and PKK-supporting locals as well as some Yezidi refugees in Al-Malikiyah indeed protested against the invervention of the Rojava Peshmerga and said that the pro-PKK forces had every right to defend themselves from the Peshmerga attacks. In Rojava, the Kurdish youth group Ciwanen Soresger, which is close to the PKK-allied Democratic Union Party, attacked KNC offices in Al-Darbasiyah and Qamishli in protest of the Sinjar clashes.

The Peshmerga, on the other side, blamed the pro-PKK fighters for the escalation. They argued that they wanted to avoid further clashes, but were also the legitimate security force of Sinjar and because of that, "Peshmerga forces are free to move whenever and wherever they want in Kurdistan's soil. We will not ask permission from anyone". The KDP also stated that the PKK should simply leave Sinjar to avoid further tensions, with Omed Sabah, spokesperson of Masoud Barzani, stating that the YBŞ's presence in Sinjar was not legitimized "just because they have a few people from Shingal in their rank".

Osman Baydemir, the spokesperson of the HDP, called the conflict between the pro-PKK and pro-KDP forces a "civil war" that "has to stop". Similarly, Patriotic Union of Kurdistan deputy Kosrat Rasul Ali also condemned the infighting on both legal as well as moral grounds. Josef Weidenholzer, a Member of the European Parliament and chairman of the Yezidi Friendship Group, appealed the Rojava Peshmerga and the Sinjar Resistance Units to "stop all hostilities and solve political differences", also because any international support to either faction is dependent of "the peaceful solution of Intra-Kurdish problems".

Several civilian inhabitants of Khanasor, meanwhile, expressed frustration and anger at the clashes, saying that both groups should focus on expelling ISIL from southern Sinjar rather than fighting each other. Some locals even said both groups should simply retreat from the Sinjar Mountains, and leave the Yezidi civilians alone. Both Mir Tahsin Beg, leader of the Yezidi community, as well as Nadia Murad, female Yezidi activist and UN Goodwill ambassador, called on both sides to stop the fighting. Murad said that "it is deeply saddening for me to see once again victims of genocide become victims of an internal conflict, it is painful to see the Yezidi women again are suffering from fear after all that happened to them". An expert also warned that both the Sinjar Resistance Units as well as the Rojava Peshmerga had been very effective at "keeping IS at bay" and that the fighting among these anti-ISIL forces "would slow the process to liberate the remaining territory from IS".

In a statement on 3 March, the Kurdish National Alliance in Syria, which consists of former KNC groups, called for the cessation of hostilities in Sinjar. The alliance called on all armed groups to "resort to calm and restraint" and to begin dialogue. The KNAS also called for an end to "biased media campaigns" that broadcast "sedition" among Kurdish factions.

The Ministry of Defence of Germany expressed concern that German weapons supplied to the Peshmerga were used in the clashes. "The government of the Kurdistan-Iraq region has committed itself, by final declaration, to use the delivered weapons only for the fight against the so-called Islamic State and in accordance with international humanitarian law", a defence ministry spokesman told Der Spiegel on 6 March.
