= Democratic initiative =

Democratic initiative process (Turkish: Demokratik açılım süreci)(also called the Kurdish Opening) is the name of the process in which the government of Prime Minister Recep Tayyip Erdoğan launched a project aiming to improve standards of democracy, freedoms and respect for human rights in Turkey. The project is called the Unity and Fraternity Project (Turkish: Milli Birlik ve Kardeşlik Projesi). Interior Minister Beşir Atalay stated the primary goals of the initiative as improving the democratic standards and to end terrorism in Turkey. "We will issue circulars in the short term, pass laws in the medium term, and make constitutional amendments in the long term and take required steps," Prime Minister Erdoğan said.

== Roundtable meetings ==
Prime Minister Recep Tayyip Erdoğan hold several meetings with prominent figures of the Turkish society at the Dolmabahçe Palace in Istanbul. In these meetings, Erdoğan explained the importance and the necessity of the democratic initiative. The meetings were broadcast live on television and radio. It was the first time in Turkish history that a prime minister hosted such meetings.

The first meeting was on February 20, 2010. Prime Minister Recep Tayyip Erdoğan came together with renowned names of Turkish pop, folk and classical music to ask for their support for the democratic initiative. “Your songs have the power to transcend deaf walls. You are the heartfelt voice of this country. I ask you to help this movement of change with your artistic sensitivity.” Erdoğan said. Rojin, a singer of Kurdish origin, came to the meeting with dossiers in her hand, asking for justice for the minors facing long-term jail sentences for throwing stones at the police in the southeastern provinces.

The second meeting was on March 20, 2010. The Prime Minister met with prominent figures of the Turkish cinema. Erdoğan stressed that the democratic initiative would be incomplete without the artists’ support. “Deep down in my heart I believe that you will shoulder the process and lend your support, contribute and make an effort to solving Turkey's painful problems,” he said. Erdoğan also argued that the AKP government had embarked on this journey with the inspiration it received from messages given by artists. “We set off on the road after having seen the issues raised by artists, starting from their products, and taking inspiration and strength from them. Thus, your words, suggestions and criticism bear a vital significance for us. What we are doing today is simply bringing all those problems you talked about in your movies, soap operas, plays and shows onto our agenda. It is an effort to produce concrete solutions to them. Many unmentioned, non-discussed, invisible, unknown and ignored groups and their problems have been made known thanks to you. You first noticed all those pains, sorrows, needs and then you made them public,” he said. In the afternoon there was a meeting with radio programmers. Yavuz Seçkin, one of the attendants, said he has been working in the industry for 15 years and that Erdoğan was the first prime minister to ask about their views on a matter troubling the country.

On April 17, 2010 was the third meeting with authors and thinkers. The Prime Minister told the attendees that there has recently been a serious change of paradigm in the administration of the state. According to the prime minister, the goal of the meetings is to discuss the country's chronic problems and reach broad agreement on ways to solve them. “Long-lasting problems obstruct the development of the country and the nation. They waste our energy and resources.”

The fourth meeting was on June 5, 2010. Erdoğan met with prominent figures of the sports world and the internet media.

In the fifth meeting on July 18, Erdoğan met with women representatives from various civil society groups, including NGOs such as KA-DER or the Foundation for Women's Solidarity (Turkish: Kadın Dayanışma Vakfı). In his opening address, Erdoğan stressed that the project has not lost any speed, but noting that the government and society cannot successfully solve the nation's issues without the constructive input and participation of others. He advised them to contribute instead of just criticizing, saying "those who allege that the democratic opening has no content, they can fill it themselves. We are ready for this." “Despite our calls, nobody is coming up to us with anything. You can't resolve issues that were developed over hundreds of years in a single night.” In the subsequent Q&A session, he was asked why he kept addressing them exclusively as mothers, overlooking the fact that they are fully-fledged economic, political and juridical persons. Erdoğan's widely noted answer was: "I do not believe in the equality of men and women. I believe in equal opportunities. Men and women are different and complementary."

The last meeting was on September 27, 2010. Prime Minister Erdoğan invited dozens of representatives from Turkey's leading media companies. During the meeting, the prime minister touched upon a large number of hot issues, including the referendum, expectations for a new constitution, approaching parliamentary elections and compulsory military service.

== Ethnic groups ==
=== Armenian initiative ===
Turkey was among the first countries in the world to recognize the state of Armenia after its independence in 1991. After Armenia's occupation of the Azeri territory Nagorno-Karabakh, Turkey sided with its Turkic ally Azerbaijan over the First Nagorno-Karabakh War by closing its borders with Armenia. Since then, the border remains closed.

On February 21, 2008, President Abdullah Gül send a message of congratulations to the newly elected Armenian President Serzh Sargsyan and said "that he hoped the victory of Sargsyan in Armenia's presidential election would lead to a normalization of relations between their estranged countries." In reaction, Armenian President Sargsyan invited Gül to attend a FIFA World Cup qualifier football match between the Turkish and Armenian national football teams. After accepting the invitation, President Gül became the first Turkish head of state to visit Armenia on September 3, 2008. This “football diplomacy” and new dialogue resulted in the signing of protocols between Turkish and Armenian Foreign Ministers in Switzerland to improve relations between the two countries.

The Armenian Constitutional Court decided that the protocols “cannot be interpreted or applied in the legislative process and application practice of the Republic of Armenia as well as in the interstate relations in a way that would contradict the provisions of the preamble to the RA Constitution and the requirements of Paragraph 11 of the Declaration of Independence of Armenia.” Turkey said that Armenian court's ruling on the protocols is not acceptable. The parliament of Armenia and Turkey decided for the suspension of the ratification process.

Between May 2005 and October 2006, the Turkish Ministry of Culture financed the restoration of an old Armenian church located in an eastern Turkish province. The restoration had a stated budget of 2 million Turkish lira (approximately 1.4 million USD)

On April 2, 2009, the Turkish state television started broadcasts in Armenian on for half an hour twice a day.

On September 19, 2010, a religious ceremony was held at the historical Armenian church after permission of the Turkish government for the first time in 95 years. The museum located on Akdamar Island in Lake Van in Turkey was opened to worshippers allowing to worship once a year for a single day.

In 2010, Armenian schools in Turkey received updated textbooks after a decision by Nimet Çubukçu, the Minister of Education. The old textbooks had not been revised since 1934.

=== Kurdish initiative ===
Erdoğan addresses the members of parliament during a heated debate at the Turkish Parliament about democracy and the democratic initiative.

The Kurdish initiative (Turkish: Kürt açılımı, also called Kurdish Opening) was the most discussed initiative of the government. The main goal of the Kurdish initiative was to improve the human rights of Turkish citizens of Kurdish origin and to end a 25-year conflict between Turkey and the PKK. Interior Minister Beşir Atalay was responsible for the coordination of the initiative.

On 29 July 2009, Minister Beşir Atalay announced the government's Kurdish move, vowing to solve the problem through “more freedom and more democracy.” Few days later, the government held its first workshop to hear suggestions on the move from important intellectuals, including columnists and academics. On August 25, 2009, the General Staff reiterated the military's commitment in preserving Turkey's “unitary” structure and said the Kurdish move cannot be accepted as a compromise process with the PKK.

On 13 November 2009, Atalay informed the Parliament about the initiative and had preliminary talks with opposition parties regarding the issue. The democratic initiative aimed to protect and extend the human rights and freedoms of every citizen, regardless of ethnicity, religion and political or social choices, Atalay said. “These developments will align our domestic policies with the European Convention on Human Rights,” Atalay said, disclosing six medium-term goals as part of the democratic initiative.

On the same day, Prime Minister Recep Tayyip Erdoğan called on parliamentary deputies to support the democratic initiative in respect to pluralist structure of the first Turkish Parliament, which commanded the country's independence war in the early 1920s. “Parliament is the stage where all issues will be frankly and freely debated. This Parliament cannot fall behind Mustafa Kemal Atatürk's Parliament. We cannot sacrifice the basic principles that were based on pluralism, freedom and democracy 89 years ago," Erdoğan said in his long-speech he delivered at the special session. Atatürk established diplomatic relations with the occupier countries as soon as the war was over, Erdoğan said, repeating his famous remark, “Peace at home and peace in the world.” The final aim is to reach national unity and brotherhood. It is a process of democracy,” he said while describing the move. The deputies representing the Republican People's Party (CHP), later left the parliamentary hall in protest. CHP leader Deniz Baykal commented that Erdoğan's Justice and Development Party was trying to divide the country. Erdoğan stated that he would travel to all 81 provinces to explain the content of the democratic initiative. He also accused the main opposition party CHP and the Nationalist Movement Party (MHP) of ignoring the citizens in eastern Anatolia. “The difference is richness,” he said.

In order to make a constitutional amendment, the government was in need of the support from the opposition parties in addition to that of the pro-Kurdish Democratic Society Party (DTP). However, the CHP and the MHP wouldn't be supportive to the project to admit PKK members to benefit from Article 221 of the Turkish Penal Code, popularly known as the Active Repentance Law. Both alleged it carried the risk of dividing Turkey. On 11 December 2009, the Constitutional Court voted unanimously to close the DTP for "being a center of activities against the unity of the state and the nation." The court's decision stated that it closed the party because of DTP members' involvement in activities that "supported the armed attacks" of the PKK. The court also found that the DTP was in "touch and solidarity" with the PKK. The closure resulted in the banning of 37 DTP members from politics for five years, including two members of parliament.

In January 2009, the state-owned TRT devoted one television and radio station to 24-hour Kurdish broadcasts without subtitles and with no time limit on news broadcasts. TRT officials indicated that there was no censorship of content on the station. On 13 November the government approved regulations to allow privately owned television and radio stations to broadcast in languages other than Turkish.

The following measures were to be taken within the context of the democratic initiative:

- Constructing an independent human rights institution;
- Creating an Anti-Discrimination Committee;
- Creating a commission for complaints against Turkish security forces;
- Children will no longer be prosecuted under terrorism legislation.
- Allowing election campaigns and propaganda in languages other than Turkish;
- Allowing prisoners to speak languages other than Turkish with their visitors;
- Allowing for 24-hour private television stations to broadcast in languages other than Turkish;
- Approval to universities to teach the Kurdish and Zazaki language among other "living" languages.
- Renaming of residential areas in line with demands from locals.
- Fewer roadblocks in southeastern Turkey and freer access to agricultural areas;
- Permitting access to social and religious services in languages other than Turkish;
- National mechanism to prevent torture;
- Parliamentary ratification of the UN Optional Protocol to the Convention against Torture and other Cruel, Inhuman or Degrading Treatment or Punishment.

=== Roma initiative ===
The Roma are an ethnic minority of Turkey. They descend from the times of the Byzantine Empire. Records about their presence in 9th century Asia Minor exist, where they arrived from Persia. With the expanse of the Ottoman Empire Turkish Roma settled also in Rumelia (Southern Europe under the Ottoman rule). Sulukule is the oldest Roma settlement in Europe. The descendants of the Ottoman Roma today are known as Xoraxane Roma and are of the Islamic faith. In modern Turkey there are officially about 500,000 Roma in Turkey. The Roma in Turkey have long faced discrimination in terms of access to housing, employment and education.

On March 14, 2010, Prime Minister Recep Tayyip Erdoğan met with nearly 10,000 Roma citizens in Istanbul as part of the government's Roma initiative. “As the state, we have shouldered the responsibility on this issue. From now on, your problems are my problems. Nobody in this country can be treated as ‘half’ a person,” he said. This was the first time a Turkish prime minister had come out to meet with Roma citizens.

The Turkish government has started to construct close to 3,500 new homes for the Roma across Turkey. It has also launched a project to include information about the Roma in school textbooks and the elimination of insulting expressions about the Roma from course books as well as the provision of identity cards for all Roma and social programs to keep Roma children from abusing drugs, along with the prevention of early marriages.

In the same year, the European Roma Rights Centre, the Helsinki Citizens Assembly, and the Edirne Roma Culture Research and Solidarity Association conducted a program to train the Romani community on civil society organization and activism. Literacy courses for Romani women offered by the Roma Culture and Solidarity Association of Izmir continued. These associations also celebrated the International Roma Day in Ankara.

== Religious groups ==
=== Alevi initiative ===
Academics estimated the Alevi population at 15 to 20 million, including ethnic Turks and Kurds. In general, Alevis follow a belief system that incorporates aspects of both Shia and Sunni Islam and draws on the traditions of other religions found in Anatolia as well. The government considers Alevism a heterodox Muslim sect; however, some Alevis and Sunnis maintain that Alevis are not Muslims.

Alevi "cem houses" (places of gathering) have no legal status as places of worship in the state. However, Kuşadası and Tunceli municipalities ruled that Alevi cem houses could receive free water and electricity from the municipality like other recognized places of worship, but they did not have the authority to grant formal "temple status" to cem houses.

In 2008, Prime Minister Recep Tayyip Erdoğan broke his fast with 1,000 Alevis in Ankara. For the first time in the history of the republic, a Turkish prime minister sat with Alevis to share their mourning and participate in a typically Alevi event. Prime Minister Erdoğan gave a message of unity and solidarity. He also hinted that his government is ready to engage with the Alevis in a serious manner and respond to their demands.

The Alevi initiative is the first systematic effort to address Alevis’ identity-based contentions. During the years 2009 and 2010, the government took steps to recognize and address the concerns of the Alevi population. State Minister Faruk Çelik is charged of coordinating the government's Alevi initiative aiming to find a solution to the problems of Alevis living in Turkey. The government held quarterly Alevi workshops aimed at addressing the concerns of the Alevi population. After seven workshops, a report is prepared and submitted to Prime Minister Recep Tayyip Erdoğan for his consideration. Some Alevi groups complained that these workshops did not address the needs of all Alevi groups, but only the ones close to the government.

Faruk Çelik has announced that Alevi children should receive religious education in Alevi houses of worship, or cemevis. The minister has launched commissioning bodies that will work toward the legal recognition of cemevis as houses of worship and Alevi textbooks to differentiate religious education and religious culture within the curriculum for children. In the next academic year, there will be a clear definition in the curriculum between religious practice and religious culture, Çelik said. “In culture lessons children will be taught about who Alevis are and what it means to be an Alevi in addition to daily Alevi practices,” he said.

In December 2009, state-owned TRT broadcast documentaries and religious and cultural programs about Alevism during the first 12 days of Muharram, a month held sacred by Alevis and other Muslims. On January 7, 2010, the 12th day of the month, TRT aired live programs from three large cemevis in Istanbul and Ankara.

On March 31, 2011, the Turkish government released its final report on the Alevi workshops. The report was the result of a series of workshops organized by the government to hear the Alevi community. The report said the cemevis should have a legal status and that they should be financially supported by the state in accordance with the principle of equality. The views of Turkish Prime Minister Recep Tayyip Erdoğan and those of the State Minister Faruk Çelik, who coordinated the workshops, were also included in the final report. Noting that certain layers of society have been neglected, despised and subjected to unjust treatment as a result of social trauma in the past, Erdoğan said the workshops were the first time the problems of Alevis had been listened to by the state.

=== Greek Orthodox initiative ===
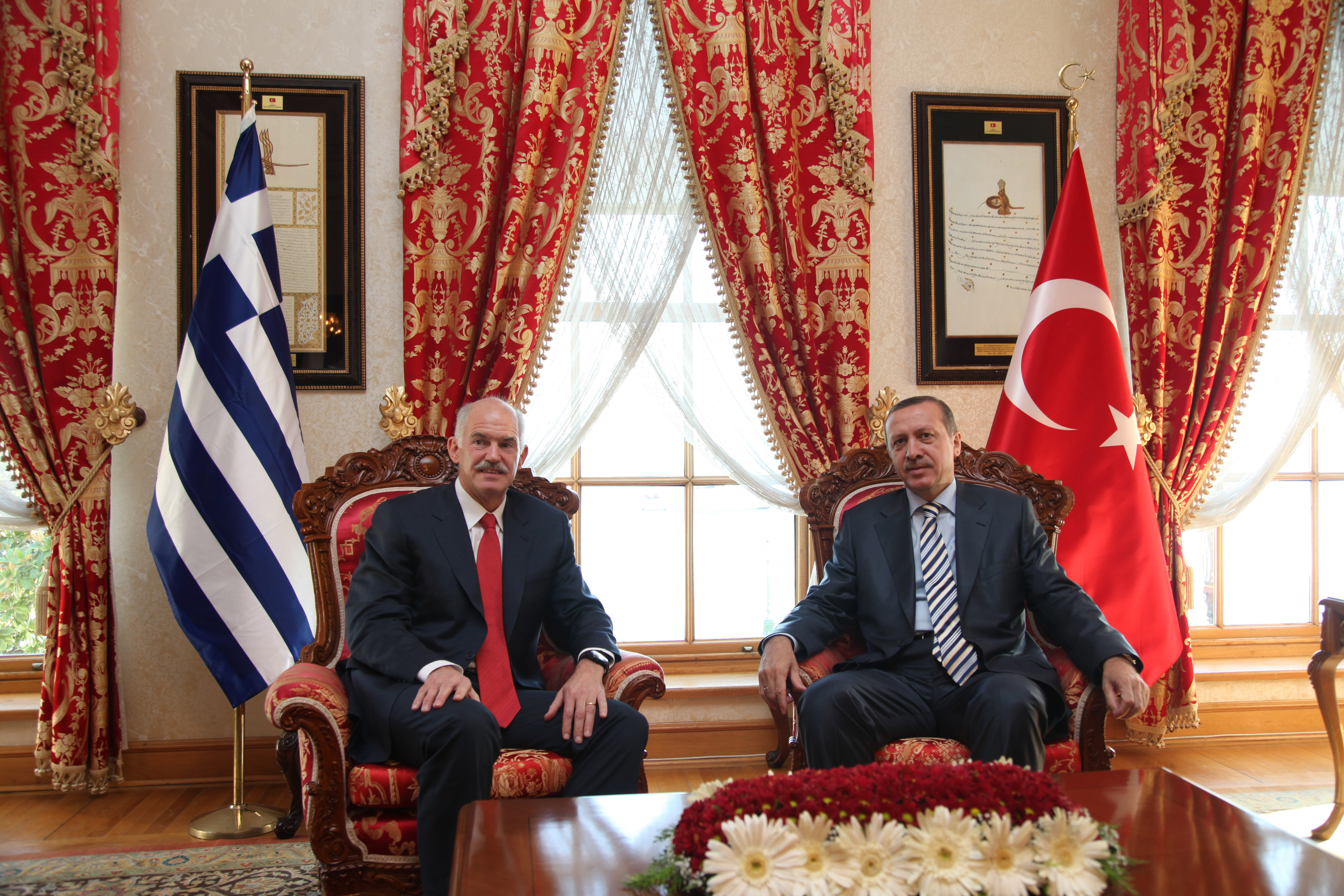
Greek Prime Minister Papandreou and Turkish Prime Minister Erdoğan

On August 15, 2009, Prime Minister Erdoğan and members of his cabinet hosted a meeting for religious leaders of the Greek Orthodox, Syriac Orthodox, and Jewish communities on Büyükada, an island near Istanbul, to address minority religious rights.

The government did not recognize the ecumenical status of the Greek Orthodox patriarch, acknowledging him only as the head of the country's Greek Orthodox community. As a result, the state has long maintained that only citizens of the country could become patriarch, serve as members of the Greek Orthodox Holy Synod, and participate in patriarchal elections.

Prime Minister Erdoğan has stated that the Greek Orthodox patriarch's use of the title "ecumenical" should not be a matter on which the state should rule.

In December 2008 the Ministry of Foreign Affairs provided one-year visas for foreign clergy working at the Ecumenical Patriarchate. Previously, such clergy had to leave and return every three months to obtain new tourist visas.

The Ecumenical Patriarchate in Istanbul continued to seek to reopen the Halki seminary on the island of Heybeli in the Sea of Marmara. The seminary was closed in 1971 when the patriarchate, to avoid the seminary being administered by the state, chose not to fulfill a government requirement for all private institutions of higher learning to nationalize. Prime Minister Erdoğan and Greek Prime Minister Papandreou are working together to improve the rights of Christians in Turkey and Muslims in Greece. It is expected that the Greeks will open the first legal mosque in Athens and the Turks will open the Halki seminary in Istanbul.

Reports of attacks on persons practicing Christian faiths dropped. Authorities took measures during the year to implement a 2007 Ministry of Interior circular to governors requesting action to prevent violence against non-Muslims. Non-Muslims in Ankara, Izmir, and Trabzon reported that police took extra security measures during special religious services.

On May 13, 2010, Prime Minister Erdoğan ordered state officials and civil servants to avoid raising any difficulties in their formal dealings with members of Turkey's recognized non-Muslim minority groups, according to a decree he issued in the Official Gazette. Erdoğan said in his decree that despite efforts exerted in recent years for democratization and for improvement in issues regarding the Greek, Armenian and Jewish minorities in Turkey, problems have not been solved entirely due to setbacks in the implementation process. Erdoğan has ordered prompt action in issues such as the protection and maintenance of minority cemeteries, implementation in land registry offices of court orders in favor of minority foundations, and swift legal action on publications inciting hatred against non-Muslim communities.

The law allows the 161 minority foundations recognized by the General Directorate of Foundations (GDF) to acquire property, and in 2008 the GDF approved 365 applications by non-Muslim foundations to acquire legal ownership of properties. A February 2008 amendment to the law facilitated the return of expropriated minority foundation properties.

On August 15, 2010, Orthodox Christians from Georgia, Greece, Russia, Turkey and the United States gathered in Trabzon for a historic mass at the iconic Sümela Monastery. The monastery was for the first time in 88 years opened to worship. Greek Orthodox Patriarch Bartholomew led the mass, marking the Assumption of the Mother Mary, a sacred day for Orthodox Christians. "We owe this day of worship to our government, which was kind enough to grant us the permission", the patriarch said at Trabzon Airport. “We are most thankful as this day is sacred for not only believers in the Black Sea but for all Orthodox and the Christian world as it is the Assumption Day of Mother Mary. We are blessed to celebrate this day here in Sümela. First it is grace from God and then it is grace from the government.”

=== Caferi initiative ===
The Caferis, Turkey's principal Shi'a community of Azeri-Iranian origin, concentrated mostly in the eastern part of the country and Istanbul, do not face restrictions on their religious freedoms. They build and operate their own mosques and appoint their own imams, but as with the Alevis, their places of worship have no legal status and receive no support from the Diyanet.

On December 27, 2009, more than thousand members of the Caferi community gathered for the 1370th anniversary of the events in which Prophet Muhammad's grandson Hüseyin bin Ali and 72 others became a martyr in Karbala. The leader of this community, Selahattin Özgündüz, held a speech about the importance of the democratic initiative.

On October 9, 2010, the Presidency of Religious Affairs prepared two separate "ilmihal" (an Islamic version of a catechism) for the Caferi and Shafi`i communities in Turkey.

In 2010, Erdoğan became the first prime minister of Turkey to attend a ceremony organized to commemorate the tragedy at Karbala.
