= Murat Karayılan =

Acting military commander (born 1954)

- Mirad Qarayîlan
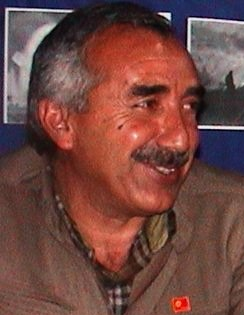
- Karayılan in 2005
- Born: 5 June 1954 (age 72); Birecik, Şanlıurfa, Turkey
- Other name: Cemal
- Military career
- Allegiance: Kurdistan Workers' Party (PKK)
- Service years: 1979–Now
- Rank: Commander-in-Chief
- Nickname: Cemal
- Known for: Co-founder and acting leader of Kurdistan Workers' Party
- Conflicts: Kurdistan Workers' Party insurgency; Kurdistan Region–PKK conflict; Operation Kiran; Operation Claw-Eagle 2
- Other work: Author of Bir Savaşın Anatomisi (Anatomy of War)

Murat Karayılan (Kurdish: Mirad Qarayîlan; born 5 June 1954), also nicknamed Cemal, is one of the co-founders of the Kurdistan Workers' Party (PKK). He became the PKK's acting leader after its original founder and leader, Abdullah Öcalan, was captured in 1999 by Turkish intelligence agents. In 2014, he left the PKK leader position and was assigned as the new commander-in-chief of the PKK's armed wing, the People's Defence Forces.

== Biography ==
Karayılan was born on 5 June 1954, in Birecik, Şanlıurfa, Karayılan finished his studies at a vocational college of machinery and joined the Kurdistan Workers' Party (PKK) in 1979. He was active in his native province of Şanlıurfa until he fled to Syria at the time of the 1980 Turkish coup d'état. He called on Kurds to stop serving in the military of Turkey, stop paying taxes and stop using the Turkish language.

Karayılan was among the PKK leadership accused of narcotic trafficking by the United States Office of Foreign Assets Control on 14 October 2009.

On 13 December 2016, the Mardin 1st Criminal Court of Peace issued a detention warrant for Karayılan and Duran Kalkan, another PKK commander, as part of an investigation into the killing of the Kaymakam of Derik, Muhammet Fatih Safitürk.

In March 2017, there were reports of a failed assassination attempt against Karayılan, but it was unclear as to whether the attempt was made by Turkish forces or a group within the PKK.

Karayılan and two other PKK leaders were wanted by the government of the United States and the government of Turkey; the PKK is considered a terrorist organization by the United States European Union and Turkey. PKK-affiliated groups operating in Iraq have been accused by human rights organisations of recruiting child soldiers.

From 28 October 2015, he was in the red category of the "most wanted terrorists" list published by the Ministry of Interior of the Republic of Turkey. The Ministry offered a reward of up to 10 million ₺ for his capture.

Murat Karayilan was also the author of a book called Bir Savaşın Anatomisi (Anatomy of War).
