= Israel–PKK relations =

Overview of the conflict between Israel and the Kurdistan Workers' Party

The Israel–PKK relations refers to the relations between Israel and the Kurdistan Workers' Party (PKK). The PKK adhered to an Anti-Zionist stance and opposed Israel, as part of Abdullah Öcalan's teachings. When the PKK was based in the Beqaa Valley in the 1980s, it clashed with the Israeli Defense Forces many times, with continued tensions between the two sides afterwards.

== Background ==
The PKK's ideology started off as a Marxism–Leninism with a blend of Kurdish nationalism. Marxist-Leninists have a long history of hostility towards Zionism. However, the PKK's ideology later shifted to Democratic confederalism, a left-wing, libertarian socialist, anticapitalist, and internationalist ideology which also goes against Zionism. Democratic confederalism aims to replace ethnostates and capitalism with administrative councils elected by locals, allowing the people to have autonomous control over themself while linking themself to other communities via a network of confederal councils. Democratic confederalism also hopes to dissolve the United Nations. Abdullah Öcalan frequently stated his Anti-Zionist stance and also made negative statements towards the existence of Israel. Various leading members of the PKK, such as Mustafa Karasu, Duran Kalkan, Cemîl Bayik, and Besê Hozat, have also made negative statements towards Zionism and Israel.

In a comment submitted to Internationalist Commune, Mustafa Karasu confirmed the PKK's official stance on Israel, stating that "Since the emergence of the PKK, we have been against Zionism. We compared the genocide of the Kurds in Turkey with Israeli Zionism and the Apartheid regime of South Africa. Since its founding, the PKK has fought side by side with the Palestinians. In 1982, 13 of our cadres fell in the fight against the occupation of Lebanon by Israel. The Israeli state also participated in the international conspiracy against Abdullah Öcalan, and murdered four of our comrades in Berlin. No doubt, we will never forget the support the Palestinians gave to the Kurdish people in the 1980s. Our attitude towards Zionism has always been ideological. Until today, we stand on the side of the Palestinians and all those who are fighting for a democratic solution in the region."

== Military clashes ==
Israel-PKK conflict
- Part of the Lebanese Civil War, 1982 Lebanon War, South Lebanon conflict (1985–2000), Kurdistan Workers' Party insurgency, and Iran–Israel proxy conflict
Date	1982 – 1992 (10 years)
Location	Beqaa Valley, Lebanon
Result	Inconclusive: PKK withdrew from the Beqaa Valley and relocated to Damascus, Syria in 1992, and later the Qandil Mountains in Iraqi Kurdistan in 1998

Belligerents
Israel; Lebanese Forces; South Lebanon Army Supported by: Turkey; United States	PKK (Palestine) PLO; ASALA Supported by: Iran; Ba'athist Syria

Commanders and leaders
(Israel) Menachem Begin (Israel) Ariel Sharon (Israel) Rafael Eitan (Israel) David Ivry (Israel) Ze'ev Almog (Israel) Yekutiel Adam † (Israel) Benjamin Netanyahu (Israel) Yitzhak Mordechai	Abdullah Öcalan; Mahsum Korkmaz; Osman Öcalan; Müslüm Durgun; Ibrahim Parlak; Şemdin Sakık; Ali Haydar Kaytan; Murat Karayılan; Bahoz Erdal; Cemil Bayık; Duran Kalkan; Mustafa Karasu

Strength
Over 40,000	Around 10,000

Casualties and losses
Unknown	13 killed, 15 captured

=== Conflict in Lebanon ===
After its expulsion from Turkey, the PKK relocated to Syria and later to the Beqaa Valley in Lebanon. The PKK was supported by the Assad government at the time. The first PKK militants that arrived at Beqaa Valley received training in 1980 at a Democratic Front for the Liberation of Palestine (DFLP) camp near Helwah, Rashaya District, Lebanon, and the PKK presence increased to the point that the DFLP could no longer afford to accommodate the PKK trainees. Öcalan arranged plans with other factions, including Fatah, Popular Front for the Liberation of Palestine (PFLP), Palestinian Popular Struggle Front, and the Lebanese Communist Party, to train the PKK militant surplus. The DFLP did not intend to involve the PKK in the conflict against Israel, deeming them too inexperienced, and told them to only fight Israel in self-defense. The PKK mainly helped construct forts. However, the PKK ordered its entire personnel to fight Israel when the 1982 Lebanon War broke out, joining the Palestine Liberation Organization (PLO) and Armenian Secret Army for the Liberation of Armenia (ASALA) against Israel and allied Christian militias. A total of 13 PKK fighters were killed during the war. The Israeli army arrested 15 PKK militants and took them to an Israeli prison in the occupied city of Ansar, Lebanon. The PKK mentioned the detentions in the June 1984 edition of its official magazine, Serxwebûn, and featured drawings and poetry from the incarcerated militants, in which they told their experiences of being beaten by Israeli interrogators, who made racist comments on Kurds. They also claimed that the Israeli interrogators had invited Turkish interrogators to the prisons and further abused the PKK prisoners. During the 1982 war, Israel seized many camps, including those of ASALA, and sent the information to Turkey, while Turkey in turn gathered intelligence on Iran and shared it with Israel. There were several smaller PKK-allied Kurdish groups training in Lebanon which had also clashed with Israel.

As the PLO, PKK and ASALA fought against Israel, the PLO facilitated relations between the PKK and ASALA. On April 8, 1980, the PFLP hosted a press conference in Sidon, Lebanon, in which they presented 14 PKK and ASALA representatives, announcing their plans to target Turkey "until the regime falls and Armenian and Kurdish aspirations are fulfilled." Both ASALA and the PKK considered it a temporary tactical alliance, as the Armenians needed the Kurds for operations in Turkey, while the Kurdish militants sought to learn from the older and more experienced Armenian militants. The alliance conducted several joint operations against Turkish interests, including the bombing of the Turkish consulate in Strasbourg, France on November 10, 1980, the bombing of a Turkish tourist center in Rome the next day, and the bombing of the Turkish consulate in Toronto, Canada, on January 14, 1982. In the March 1982 issue of "Hay Baykar," Hagop Hagopian stated "we are fighting side by side with Kurdish revolutionaries." While the alliance disintegrated soon after, the PKK and ASALA remained allies. In 1986, the PKK established the Mahsum Korkmaz Academy in Beqaa Valley, which became their largest training camp, located near the ASALA and DFLP camps. The Mahsum Korkmaz Academy remained their main training camp until Turkey pressured the Syrian government to close it. The PKK relocated to Damascus in 1992 and reopened the camp there.

The Palestinian groups sheltering the PKK in the Beqaa Valley had a deep impact on the first generation of PKK militants. The PKK had suffered huge losses in Turkey and was militarily and politically powerless, although in the Beqaa Valley, the PKK gained military, ideological, and administrative experience that significantly benefitted the group. The experience also strengthened their belief in the Marxist concept known as the friendship of peoples. The PKK often recalled their experience in the Beqaa Valley, with many PKK veterans claiming that the group had only survived the 1980s because of the Palestinian groups.

=== Israeli cooperation with Turkey ===
Turkey had been interested in Israeli weapons since 1982 after seeing what Israel achieved in Lebanon, but could not pursue the weapons as the intifada at the time had isolated Israel in the Middle East. Noam Chomsky also added that American aid and funding to Turkey skyrocketed in 1984 with the start of the PKK insurgency, and that Turkey remained the top recipient of American aid until the arrest of Öcalan. After the 1991 Madrid peace conference, Turkey sought to improve relations with Israel in every sphere. By 1998, the amount of Israeli weapon sales to Turkey had surpassed $1 billion USD. The PKK was supported by Syria, and to lesser extents by Ba'athist Iraq and Iran. Turkey was not only concerned with the Syrian support for the PKK, but also with Iraq, Iran, and Syria building massive arsenals for non-conventional ballistic missiles and biological weapons. Turkey wanted anti-ballistic missiles from Israel, which was also concerned with the massive arsenals. Throughout the 1990s, Turkey accused Iran, Iraq, and Syria of being the top PKK supporters, and saw Israel as a crucial counterbalance.

Israel entered a police cooperation agreement with Turkey, which targeted the PKK under the pretext of a global war on terrorism. Some sources claimed that Israel had a bigger role in targeting the PKK which was not publicized. Israeli involvement in the Turkish war on the PKK increased tensions between Turkey and Syria. Turkey convinced Israel to use its American lobby to get American support on the issue of Greek S-300 missile missile deployments in Cyprus, and to stop American criticism of the repression on Kurdish cultural rights. Even under Necmettin Erbakan, Turkey continued cooperating with Israel against the PKK. In 1993, the Turkish government allowed Israel to use Turkey to gather intelligence on Syria and Iran, in exchange for Israel equipping and training Turkish troops. They signed several more military and security deals in February 1996 and August 1996. By 1999, almost all Israeli air force pilots had some experience in Turkish airspace. Turkish Defense Minister Turhan Tayan visited the occupied Golan Heights in May 1997, after which Netanyahu publicly criticized the PKK. Turkey used the Israeli strategy in south Lebanon but in Iraqi Kurdistan, while Mossad operatives also trained the MİT to track PKK militants along Iraqi and Syrian frontiers, and even assisted Turkish troops in several operations in Iraqi Kurdistan.

=== Adana Agreement ===
In 1998, after Syria ignored several Turkish warnings, Turkish forces were deployed to the borders, while Israeli troops threatened the Syrian presence in Lebanon and were already deployed to the south of Syria. As the Syrian government did not want to fight a war on two sides against allied fronts, Hafez al-Assad signed the Adana Agreement on October 20, in which he cut ties with the PKK and designated it a terrorist group. Syria had only avoided the war by expelling Öcalan. The PKK relocated to the Qandil Mountains in 1998. While the tensions over the PKK had ended, the Hatay dispute remained a major source of tensions for Turkey and Syria.

After relocating to the Qandil Mountains in 1998, the PKK focused on its insurgency against Turkey, and its insurgency against the Kurdistan Region. Netanyahu later declared his support for an independent Kurdish state and opposition to the PKK, but later declared his opposition to both.

== Relations ==
=== Arrest of Öcalan ===
After the relocation to Qandil Mountains in 1998, Abdullah Öcalan began traveling to various countries. On February 15, 1999, he was captured in Kenya on his way to the Jomo Kenyatta International Airport after leaving the Greek embassy. He was arrested by the MİT, with CIA collaboration, although it was widely believed that Mossad was involved as well. Duran Kalkan accused the US, the UK, and Israel of involvement in the arrest.

In his book Gideon's Spies, author Gordon Thomas claimed that the February 1999 capture of Öcalan was executed by Mossad following a request from Turkish Prime Minister Bülent Ecevit to Israeli Prime Minister Benjamin Netanyahu in late 1998. According to Thomas, after Öcalan spent months traveling through Europe and was refused asylum in Italy and the Netherlands, Mossad tracked him to the Greek embassy in Nairobi, Kenya, in early February 1999. The account alleges that Israeli operatives engineered a covert operation, utilizing an operative posing as a Kurdish expatriate to convince Öcalan's guard that he could be smuggled to Iraqi Kurdistan, ultimately leading to his departure from the embassy and subsequent detention by Turkish authorities on February 15, 1999. While mainstream accounts attribute the capture primarily to Turkish intelligence with U.S. collaboration, these claims highlight alleged Israeli participation behind the scenes.

The arrest of Öcalan led to chaos across the Kurdish community and diaspora, in which there were protests at Israeli embassies worldwide. A group of PKK supporters attempted to attack the Israeli consulate in Berlin, resulting in Israel killing three protestors and injuring 16 more. The German government threatened to deport those who continued the protests. It was this attack which prompted Israel to increase security in its embassies and consulates worldwide.

Israeli MP Avigdor Lieberman allegedly recommended that Israel establish relations with the PKK and support the group, although the PKK rejected it and reiterated its opposition to Israel, with Murat Karayılan also demanding that Israel issue an apology for their involvement in the arrest of Öcalan.

=== Iranian tensions ===
Throughout the 1990s, Turkey and Iran exchanged criticism, with Iran criticizing Turkey for its secularism and good relations with Israel, and Turkey accusing Iran of harboring the PKK within its territories and supporting various other armed groups. In the mid-1990s, Turkey and Iran expelled ambassadors. In July 1999, Turkey directly bombed Iran, killing five people and wounding ten, with Iran retaliating by capturing two Turkish soldiers who they accused of trespassing into Iran. Ecevit harshly criticized Iran for detaining the soldiers, and also claimed that Iran had replaced Syria as the largest PKK base. They were eventually returned and relations between Turkey and Iran began to improve in 1998. By the late 1990s, both Iran and Syria complied with Turkish reques, while. Turkey made three major operations in Iraqi Kurdistan, drawing criticism from the Ba'athist Iraqi government. Although Iran and Syria cut ties with the PKK and designating it as a terrorist group by the late 1990s, Turkey claimed that they began supporting the PKK again after the Syrian civil war.

=== AKP period ===
When the Justice and Development Party came to power, it expressed support for Islamist groups such as Hamas over the traditionally secular Palestinian groups, and also pushed an Islamist rhetoric in Turkey that often involved conspiracy theories against Israel. From 2003 to 2010, Turkey spent $687 million USD to have around 170 M60-A1 tanks upgraded by the Israeli Military Industries, which were later used in 2019 Turkish offensive into northeastern Syria. While the 2010 Gaza flotilla raid caused a diplomatic crisis between Israel and Turkey, they agreed to restore relations in March 2013, and officially did so in June 2016. In 2017, Benjamin Netanyahu stated that Israel rejects the PKK and considers it a terrorist organization, and called on Turkey to return the favor by considering Hamas a terrorist organization.

Mustafa Karasu, a PKK leader, condemned the American recognition of Jerusalem as capital of Israel in 2018, and said that Jerusalem cannot be a Jewish city, but should be a city with special status in which all religions are respected. In May 2018, during the protests at the Gaza border, the PKK, as well as the HDP (frequently accused by Turkey of being the PKK political wing), condemned the killings of protestors. The HDP further criticized the ruling AKP-MHP coalition for rejecting a petition from the HDP to cease all Turkish trade with Israel. In 2020, Murat Karayılan declared that he supported whatever ended the Israeli–Palestinian conflict, even if it was a two-state solution, but claimed the only true solution to the conflict, and all conflicts in the Middle East, was democratic confederalism. Duran Kalkan rejected both the one-state and two-state solutions, claiming that democratic confederalism was the only system which guaranteed a peaceful Middle East.

In late 2022, a settlement housing Palestinians was built in Afrin, under Turkish occupation, and included 75 housing complexes intended for 220 families, located in Jindires. It drew much criticism from Syrian Kurds, especially supporters of the YPG, a group allied with the PKK. Riyad Al-Malki, the Palestinian foreign minister, stated that "we reject the settlement of any Palestinian in Afrin and other Kurdish areas" and denied any Palestinian involvement in the construction of the settlement, adding that they opposed any abuse towards Kurds and their land. Basem Naim, a Hamas politburo member, also denied any Palestinian role in the settlement of Afrin, and claimed that "we cannot build our rights, our homes, and our freedom at the expense of any other human. We cannot accept the construction of our homes and residents at the expense of other people. The Palestinians recognize that the Kurds have done great favors to Palestine and its people. We consider the role of the Kurdish people in defending Palestine, not as a secondary, marginal or political, but the Kurdish role is an authentic, historic and permanent role. We are indebted to the Kurdish people for all the sacrifices they have given throughout centuries for Palestine, and for the freedom and the dignity of the Palestinian people." It was later discovered the Bank Hapoalim, an Israeli bank, had worked with a Palestinian organization known as the "Living with Dignity Association" to fund the resettlement of Palestinians in Afrin, along with a Pakistani organization known as Faizan Global Relief Foundation.

=== Gaza war ===
In November 2023, amid the Gaza war, PKK leader Duran Kalkan stated that "three years after World War I, Turkey was established, through which the capitalist imperialist system attempted to dominate the Middle East. Three years after World War II, Israel was established, again under the lead of Britain, and Israel was included in the hegemony war waged in the region." He accused Israel and Turkey of cooperating "on the basis of a racist, chauvinist and genocidal understanding and policies." Kalkan also denied any tensions between Israel and Turkey, claiming that "sometimes it looks like there is contradiction and conflict between the Israeli and Turkish states, but this is a game they play to mask the reality and deceive the people." He also claimed that "Jewish nationalism considers Kurdistan to be [Greater] Israeli territory", but also denied being antisemitic.

In November 2023, Cemil Bayik stated that "a genocide is being carried out against the Palestinian people", but claimed that United States was "the current hegemon of capitalist modernity" which "cannot be part of a democratic solution", and that "there is talk that they want to stop Israel, but it is the policies of the USA, NATO and the capitalist states that over many years have brought Israel to the point that they can pursue such a warlike, genocidal policy. Therefore, these forces must also be stopped. Only when limits are set to capitalist modernity, of which the USA is the pioneer, and interest-driven politics are restricted, can the Israeli state be restricted." He claimed that Turkey and Iran were "exploiting the Palestinian struggle for their own interests", and that the Turkish government were especially hypocritical in their stance towards Gaza. At the same time, Murat Karayılan called Erdoğan a "self-serving figure", claiming that "he is a businessman. He plays both sides. When it suits him, he is with Israel, when it suits him, he is with Palestine." Karayılan accused Erdoğan of lacking sincerity and commitment to the same Islamic principles that he preached, and overall selfishness and opportunism.

Also in November 2023, Mazloum Abdi stated that "the attacks carried out by Hamas on Israeli civilians are totally unacceptable and we condemn them wholeheartedly. We believe that Hamas was not acting independently and that it was carrying out the agenda of external actors, Israel’s response and the staggering number of civilian deaths among the Palestinians that have ensued are no less acceptable." He stated that "the Palestinian and Kurdish issues remain the biggest sources of instability and conflict in the Middle East" and that "neither Palestinians nor the Kurds are going to disappear or give up their struggle for justice."

=== Post-Assad period ===
After the fall of the Assad regime in December 2024, tensions escalated between Turkey and Israel, as Israeli interests came in conflict with Turkish interests. The Israeli invasion of Syria began while Turkey wanted to solidify its influence in Syria. The tensions escalated many times, although there were deconfliction talks and no armed conflict took place. There were also heightened tensions between Turkey and Iran after the fall of Assad. Around the same time, a PKK-Turkey peace process was initiated in October 2024, and on May 12, 2025, the PKK held its 12th congress and announced its dissolution. In June 2025, Öcalan stated that Israel did not care for Kurds and only wanted to use Kurds as proxies for Israeli expansion. He claimed that if Israel captured Kurdistan, it would commit a genocide on Kurds and leave Kurdistan like Gaza during the Gaza war. Öcalan also claimed that he was the only one capable of stopping Israeli ambitions in Kurdistan and that Israel desperately wanted to kill him. Veysi Aktaş, a longtime confidant of Öcalan who served 31 years in prison, later claimed that Öcalan rejected Israeli plans for a Kurdish state. In July 2025, the Revolutionary Communist Movement (TKŞ), a pro-PKK Kurdish communist group based in Rojava and allied to the ruling PYD, released a video and statement condemning Israel for the blockade of the Gaza Strip, the interception of the July 2025 Gaza Freedom Flotilla, and for watching the Syrian civil war for years before invading southern Syria under the pretext of protecting the Druze, all while starving the population of Gaza. However, TKŞ praised the Druze resistance to Islamist groups. Several TKŞ members declared a hunger strike in protest to the humanitarian crisis in Gaza.

=== 2026 Iran war ===
In early March, after the 2026 Iran war broke out, Duran Kalkan stated that the PKK rejected the war, which he claimed was a continuation of American imperialism in the region dating back to the Gulf War, adding that the Kurds should not be used as cannon fodders for either side, and also stressing the importance of the PKK-Turkey peace process. Bahçeli also claimed that the Kurds were not proxies for the US and Israel. Rivar Abdanan, a PJAK leader, also stated that they were not to be used as proxies for any side, and that they would only join the war if there was an actual existential threat to the Kurds as a people, also stressing that the safety of civilians was the main priority. During the 2026 Iran war, the tensions between Israel and Turkey had worsened. The instability caused delays within the PKK-Turkey peace process. Israeli plans for the war included an invasion of Iran by Kurdish groups, although it was seen as risking potential Turkish involvement, and was largely rejected by American officials, with the KRG (KDP and PUK) also rejecting any plans for an invasion of Iran. In late July, as Turkey was preparing to introduce a draft legislation in parliament, Turkish officials had even urged Iran to stop attacking the region to avoid pushing Iranian Kurdish groups (mainly the KDPI and PAK) towards Israel, and to preserve the PKK-Turkey peace process, adding that the disruption of the regional calm and stability would only bring chaos.

== See also ==
- Israeli support for Hamas
- Turkish support for Hamas
- Ba'athist Iraq–PKK relations
- Israel–Kurdistan Region relations
- Alliance of the periphery
