= Nuri Dersimi =

Kurdish writer (1893–1973)

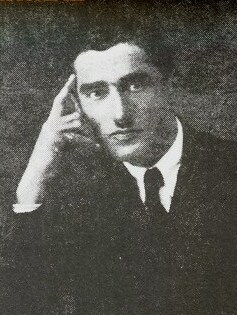
Nuri Dersimi, 1930s

Mehmed Nuri Dersimi (1893 – 22 August 1973), also known as Baytar Nuri, was a Kurdish writer, revolutionary and intellectual.

Dersimi was born in March 1893 in the village Akpınar near Hozat, in the Sanjak of Dersim. From 1899 he went to primary school in Hozat. After, he was sent to the military academy in Elazığ, but he was not happy there and asked to come back to his family. His father decided to move with his family to Harput in 1905, where Dersimi attended secondary school. There Dersimi was more comfortable. In 1907 the family moved again to Hozat, where Dersimi could stay with his uncle and visit the local boarding school. 1911 he traveled Istanbul by ship via Trabzon and began to study veterinary medicine. There he became a member of the Kurdish student society Hevi-Kürt Talebe Cemiyeti and 1912 he became the secretary of the Kürdistan Muhibban Cemiyeti.

During World War I, he worked as a military veterinarian in Erzincan. In Erzincan he was a witness of the massacres perpetrated against the Armenians. Because of his political activities, in 1916 he was sent to Kangal, in Sivas, where he married his wife Selvi. In 1917 he returned to Istanbul to finish his studies.

From 1919 to 1921 the Koçgiri rebellion took place, which Dersimi supported. He opposed the findings of Abdulkadir Ubeydullah and preferred independence to autonomy for the Kurds. In October 1920, he departed from Istanbul and travelled to the region of the Koçgiri tribe in the Erzincan Province, where he established several offices for the Society for the Rise of Kurdistan. But already in 1919, Mustafa Kemal Atatürk became aware of Dersimi's activities and offered him and Alisan, another prominent member of the Koçgiri tribe, to be a candidate for the Grand National Assembly of Turkey, an offer they both refused to accept. After the suppression of the Koçgiri rebellion, Mustafa Kemal accused Dersimi of being responsible for the uprising and excluded him from an amnesty for the rebels. After this, Dersimi hid with Seyid Riza and taught people to write Kurdish in Latin letters and was a well-perceived notable amongst the Kurdish community. In 1931 the Turkish government pardoned Dersimi and gave him a farm in Holvenk. But the Turkish authorities still kept searching his house. His friends seldom visited, and Dersimi's situation became more difficult. Following a visit to Ankara, he demanded to be provided with a new home in the west of the country, a request which was denied. After he was summoned by the military commander Abdullah Aldoğan of the Fourth Inspectorate-General in the Dersim region, he became aware that he could not stay in Turkey any longer.

In summer 1937 he decided to flee first to Greece, then to Syria, which at the time was under French Mandate. On 11 September 1937 he crossed into Syria.

He adopted several children in Syria, one of whom he named after Seyid Riza. His son Seyid Riza had a son as well who was named after his grandfather, Nuri Dersimi.

== Publications ==
- Dersimi, Mehmed Nuri (1952). Kürdistan Tarihinde Dersim (in Turkish). Aleppo: Ani Matbaası. ISBN 975-6876-44-1.
- Hatıratım, (Turkish) Dam Yayinlari, ISBN 978-6058626676
