= Ba'athist Iraq–PKK relations =

Bilateral relations

There were many allegations that the government of Ba'athist Iraq under Saddam Hussein provided support for the Kurdistan Workers' Party (PKK), including sanctuary, weapons, and logistical support, mainly in the period from 1980 until 2003. The PKK was one of several designated terrorist groups that Saddam Hussein allegedly supported.

== History ==
=== Iran–Iraq War ===
When the PKK first moved to Iraqi Kurdistan in the 1980s, both Saddam Hussein and the Kurdish groups (KDP and PUK) turned a blind eye to it. The PKK established its first bases in Iraqi Kurdistan in 1983 after signing a protocol with the KDP, although their relations deteriorated by 1985, and the protocol was terminated in 1987. After the Anfal campaign, the presence of old traditional Kurdish villages within PKK territory on the Qandil Mountains suggested that it mostly escaped the campaign. Weapons became more abundant in Iraqi Kurdistan in 1989 after the Iran–Iraq War, and the PKK had even more access to weapons after the Gulf War in 1991. As Turkey supported the US-led coalition during the Gulf War, Saddam Hussein retaliated by supporting Turkey's enemies. During the Iran-Iraq War, Turkey signed a security agreement with the Iraqi government allowing Turkish operations against the PKK, although after the Gulf War, Turkey continued to conduct operations without Iraqi permission. While Saddam Hussein tolerated Turkish raids into Iraq during the Iran-Iraq War, the US tolerated the raids after the Gulf War. The US and Turkey reached a "modus vivendi" allowing Turkish incursions into Iraq for as long as Saddam was out of the north. The Ba'athist government allegedly supported the MEK, PFLP, and ANO, in addition to the PKK.

=== Gulf War ===
As the Iraqi army hastily withdrew from Iraqi Kurdistan after the 1991 Iraqi uprisings, the PKK obtained heavy weapons left by the Iraqi army. Saddam Hussein was increasingly accused of supporting the PKK after the Gulf War, as he was frustrated with Turkey, and began slipping weapons to the PKK, which also retained its bases in Syria and capitalized on its relationship with Hafez al-Assad, despite Syria officially being part of the Allied coalition. The PKK exploited the situation, and its presence in Iraqi Kurdistan grew to the point that Öcalan switched from hit-and-run attacks to a "war of movement". The influx of around 500,000 Kurdish refugees into Turkey was seen as Saddam Hussein retaliating against Turgut Özal.

There were occasional reports in the Turkish press that the PKK had established bases in parts of Iraq under Ba'athist government control, and it was even reported that Saddam received Öcalan in June 1992. The Atlantic reported in December 1992 that Saddam Hussein began supporting the PKK after the Gulf War as a result of his worsening relations with Turkey, and that he appeared likely to continue supporting the PKK as leverage against Turkey, even if he regained access to Iraqi Kurdistan. Turgut Özal himself claimed it was easier to reach an agreement with the Iraqi Kurds than the Iraqi government in containing the PKK. Mehmet Şener, a PKK leader who later deserted and was executed by the group, accused Abdullah Öcalan of reaching a deal with Saddam Hussein, and claimed that Öcalan had personally radioed the PKK commanders not to fight Saddam during the Gulf War, although it reportedly angered many guerrillas who refused the order. The allegations aligned with the report by Hugh Pope, who claimed that during the Gulf War, roughly a quarter of PKK cadres were killed after they challenged Öcalan's refusal to support Kurdish autonomy efforts. However, in his writings, Öcalan claimed to support Kurdish autonomy within Iraq and criticized the policies of Saddam for creating "primitive nationalist" sentiments among Arabs and Kurds alike.

During the 1990s, both the KDP and PUK accused the PKK of working with Saddam Hussein. At that time, the two groups began seeking Turkish support in response to the alleged Iraqi support for the PKK. Masoud Barzani criticized the PKK as an organization used by Syria to apply pressure on Turkey, and also claimed that the PKK did "Saddam's work for him". Barzani also told Turkish officials that Saddam Hussein was using the PKK to undermine the dialogue between Turkey and the Iraqi Kurds. Abdullah Öcalan was also accused of having earlier supported the Iraqi suppression of Kurds for over a decade.

After the establishment of the autonomous region in 1992, there was a power vacuum in Iraqi Kurdistan. The Iraqi government had been expelled, although the KDP was too weak to prevent the PKK from establishing itself in large parts of the region, especially as the KDP and PUK headed into a civil war. When Turkey launched Operation Steel, some sources claim the Iraqi government was notified, although they were embarrassed and alarmed. Al-Qadisiyya, the organ of the Iraqi military establishment, vaguely reported on the operation on March 26, not mentioning that it took place inside Iraq. Radio Baghdad and the Iraqi News Agency reported that the operation took place "in a dear part of northern Iraq", and condemned it as "a flagrant violation of Iraq's sovereignty and international law," but indirectly admitted that Iraq was unable to fill the "security and authority vacuum in northern Iraq" or stop Turkey from infringing on Iraqi sovereignty. When Turkish Foreign Ministry teams visited Iraqi Kurdistan in April, the Iraqi government saw it as an alliance of Kurdish "traitors" and Turkish invaders to "guarantee the security of Turkish borders." Iraq complained to the UN Security Council and sought to mobilize international pressure on Turkey to withdraw its forces, and had three main arguments. First, Turkey violated the UN Charter and international law by encroaching on Iraqi sovereignty, territorial integrity, and airspace. Second, Turkey had exploited the situation in Iraqi Kurdistan, for which neither the US, UK, nor Iraq were to blame. Third, Turkey employed double standards with the Kurds, viewing its own Kurdish population who were affiliated with the PKK as terrorists, while at the same time cooperating with "terrorist Iraqi Kurdish groups." Iraq demanded the complete withdrawal of Turkish forces, who mostly withdrew in April, due to international rather than Iraqi pressures. Iraq challenging Kuwaiti territorial integrity in 1990 was seen as setting the precedent for others to challenge Iraqi territorial integrity.

Regardless of the increased support after the Gulf War, the Ba'athist Iraqi government was accused of playing a role in PKK activities throughout the time period from 1980 to 2003. The PKK sought bases in Iraq for many reasons, while Saddam Hussein sought regional allies and saw potential in the PKK against Turkey and Iraqi Kurds. Describing the Iraqi support, Aliza Marcus noted that "the relationship was fairly informal… more so than the PKK's relations with Iran." The 2003 invasion of Iraq ended direct Iraqi support for the PKK, although the group remained in the country. Bülent Ecevit had earlier expressed concerns to US officials about Saddam Hussein supporting the PKK. Turkish sources claimed his support for the PKK was not only meant to weaken Iraqi Kurds but also Iraqi Turkmen.

=== 2003 invasion ===
The capture of Abdullah Öcalan in 1999 and the subsequent mitigation of the PKK insurgency, followed by the 2003 invasion of Iraq, dramatically changed the regional political scene. The PKK, which had been in a unilateral ceasefire with Turkey since August 2, 1999, after Öcalan was captured, had officially ended the ceasefire on September 1, 2003, accusing Turkey of ignoring the ceasefire and increasingly isolating Öcalan. However, it did not go on the offensive until June 2004. The PKK had also ended the ceasefire to capitalize on the power vacuum in Iraq after 2003. The "post-Saddam period" was also considered the "post-Öcalan period". After Saddam Hussein was overthrown, the PKK was known to have found much military equipment from the former Iraqi Army. According to the Washington Institute for Near Eastern Policy, in summer 2003, the PKK, well-armed with Iraqi Army weapons obtained immediately after the 2003 invasion, including surface-to-air missiles, infiltrated into Turkey, adding 1,500 militants to the 500 already present in Turkey, with an additional 300 crossing the border between April and June 2004. Saddam Hussein had officially denied allegations that he supported the PKK, and either way the alleged arrangements between him and the group only had a marginal effect.

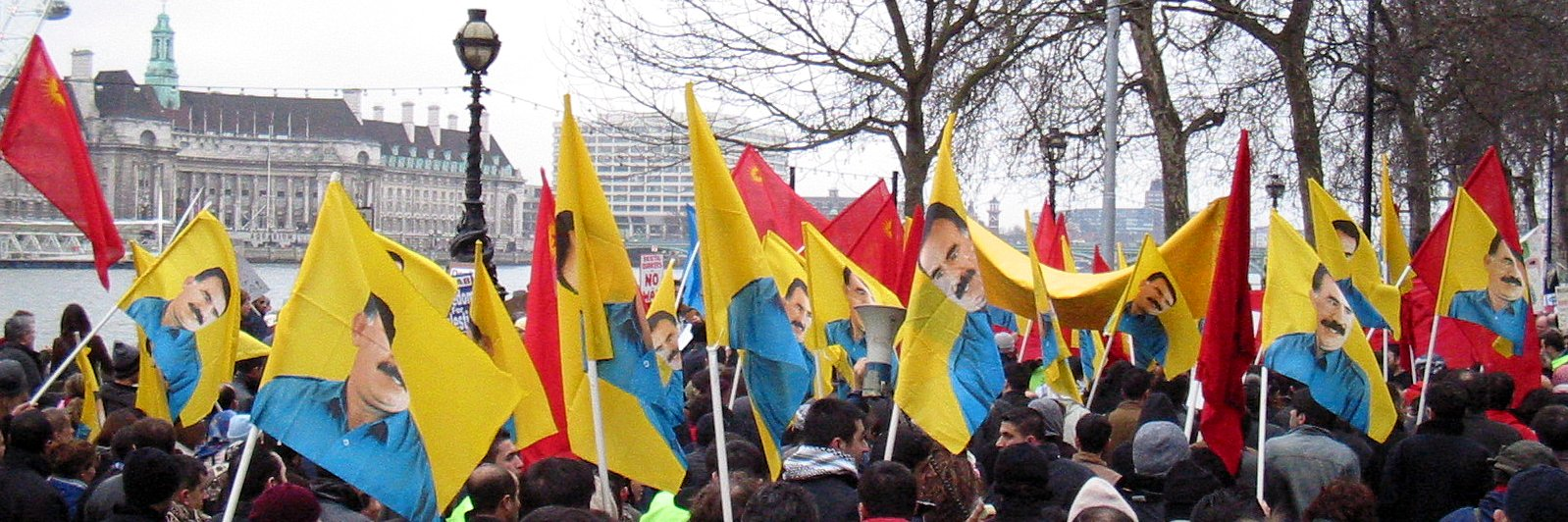
PKK supporters protesting against the Iraq War, London, April 2003

In addition to the alleged Iraqi support for the PKK, others noted that Öcalan physically resembled Saddam and that they were captured in a similar manner. In January 2007, after the execution of Saddam Hussein, Turkish media reported that Öcalan compared himself to Saddam, but claimed that he escaped execution because he did not fulfill the resistance that people expected from him, while Saddam was executed for showing intense resistance, stating that "Saddam was expecting help from the US an hour before he was handed over to the Iraqis and hanged. He trusted the United States until the last moment. He was still in a classic intense resistance with the Quran in his hand. His attitude was the attitude of those who defended the nation-state. It is the nation-state hanging in the body of Saddam. In fact, when I had surrendered, they expected an intense resistance like Saddam from me."

The 2003 invasion of Iraq caused debates within the PKK, with the more violent elements also seeking to exploit the tensions between the US and Turkey after the Turkish parliament refused to allow a ground invasion. The US viewed Saddam Hussein as the "number one threat" and the PKK as just a less important "destabilizing factor" in the region, which was a designated "terrorist organization" but also a "domestic problem of Turkey". The official Turkish policy since 1997 preferred dialogue over an invasion of Iraq. Turkey mainly feared the invasion would pave the way for a future Kurdish state, and the 2003 hood event after the invasion further worsened the general views towards it. The US did not allow Turkish intervention in Iraq after 2003 as they did not want to lose access to the only stable part of Iraq during the invasion by upsetting the Kurdish parties. Turkey constantly requested the US to suppress the PKK after the 2003 invasion, although the US did not take direct action against the PKK, despite having assisted the Peshmerga against Ansar al-Islam. The Turkish parliament passed a partial amnesty in September 2003 for surrendered PKK militants to ease the pressure. In October 2003, the US and Turkey agreed on a joint action plan against the PKK, although the US was reluctant to launch a costly military operation. In August 2006, the US appointed Joseph Ralston, a retired Army general, as the "US Special Envoy for Countering the PKK". In September 2007, Recep Tayyip Erdoğan and Nouri al-Maliki signed a memorandum of understanding against the PKK. By November 2007, there was collaboration between the MİT and CIA against the PKK, and the US did not object to the Turkish incursion in February 2008.

In 2018, KRG spokesman Sven Dzai claimed that the PKK first entered Iraqi Kurdistan during the 1980s, when Saddam Hussein was in control, without local consent, after already establishing a presence in Syria. In 2021, Ali Tatar, the governor of Duhok, claimed that the PKK was continuing the policies of Saddam Hussein in Iraqi Kurdistan. After the 2022 Zakho resort attack, Iraqi foreign ministry spokesperson Ahmed al-Sahaf claimed that "the PKK is one of the heavy and tragic legacies left by the toppled Baath regime."

== See also ==
- Saddam Hussein and al-Qaeda link allegations
- Israel–PKK relations
- Ba'athist Syria–PKK relations
