= Kozluca, Hozat =

Village in Tunceli Province, Turkey

Kozluca
- Village
- Location within Turkey
- Coordinates: 39.2173°N 39.0520°E
- Country: Turkey
- Province: Tunceli
- District: Hozat
- Population (2022): 0
- Time zone: UTC+3 (TRT)

Kozluca (Kurdish: Qolce) is a village in the Hozat District, Tunceli Province, Turkey. The village was unpopulated as of 2022.

The hamlets of Akgeçit and Anıklı are attached to the village.

== Population ==
The village was populated by Kurds of the Qoçan tribe but was depopulated by the Turkish authorities in the 1990s.

The village had no registered population from 2007 to 2013, 2 people in 2014, 1 person in 2015 and unpopulated again between 2016 and 2022.
