= Çığırlı, Hozat =

Village in Tunceli Province, Turkey

Çığırlı
- Village
- Location within Turkey
- Coordinates: 39.080°N 39.350°E
- Country: Turkey
- Province: Tunceli
- District: Hozat
- Population (2021): 92
- Time zone: UTC+3 (TRT)

Çığırlı (Kurdish: Zimêq) is a village in the Hozat District, Tunceli Province, Turkey. The village is populated by Kurds of the Abasan tribe and had a population of 92 in 2021.

The hamlets of Bakacak, Kayabağ, Meşedibi and Nişangah are attached to the village.
