= Koruköy, Hozat =

Village in Tunceli Province, Turkey

Koruköy
- Village
- Location within Turkey
- Coordinates: 39.1493°N 39.1716°E
- Country: Turkey
- Province: Tunceli
- District: Hozat
- Population (2021): 13
- Time zone: UTC+3 (TRT)

Koruköy (Kurdish: Kori) is a village in the Hozat District, Tunceli Province, Turkey. The village is populated by Kurds of the Laçin tribe and had a population of 13 in 2021.

The hamlets of Bıyıklı and Söğütle are attached are the village.
