= Çaytaşı, Hozat =

Village in Tunceli Province, Turkey

Çaytaşı
- Village
- Location within Turkey
- Coordinates: 39.125°N 39.192°E
- Country: Turkey
- Province: Tunceli
- District: Hozat
- Population (2021): 107
- Time zone: UTC+3 (TRT)

Çaytaşı (Kurdish: Lolantanêr) is a village in the Hozat District, Tunceli Province, Turkey. The village is populated by Kurds of the Karabal tribe and had a population of 107 in 2021.

The hamlets of Akveysi, Deliktaş, İbrahim Taner and Sarısu are attached to the village.
