= Hozat District =

District of Tunceli Province, Turkey

- District
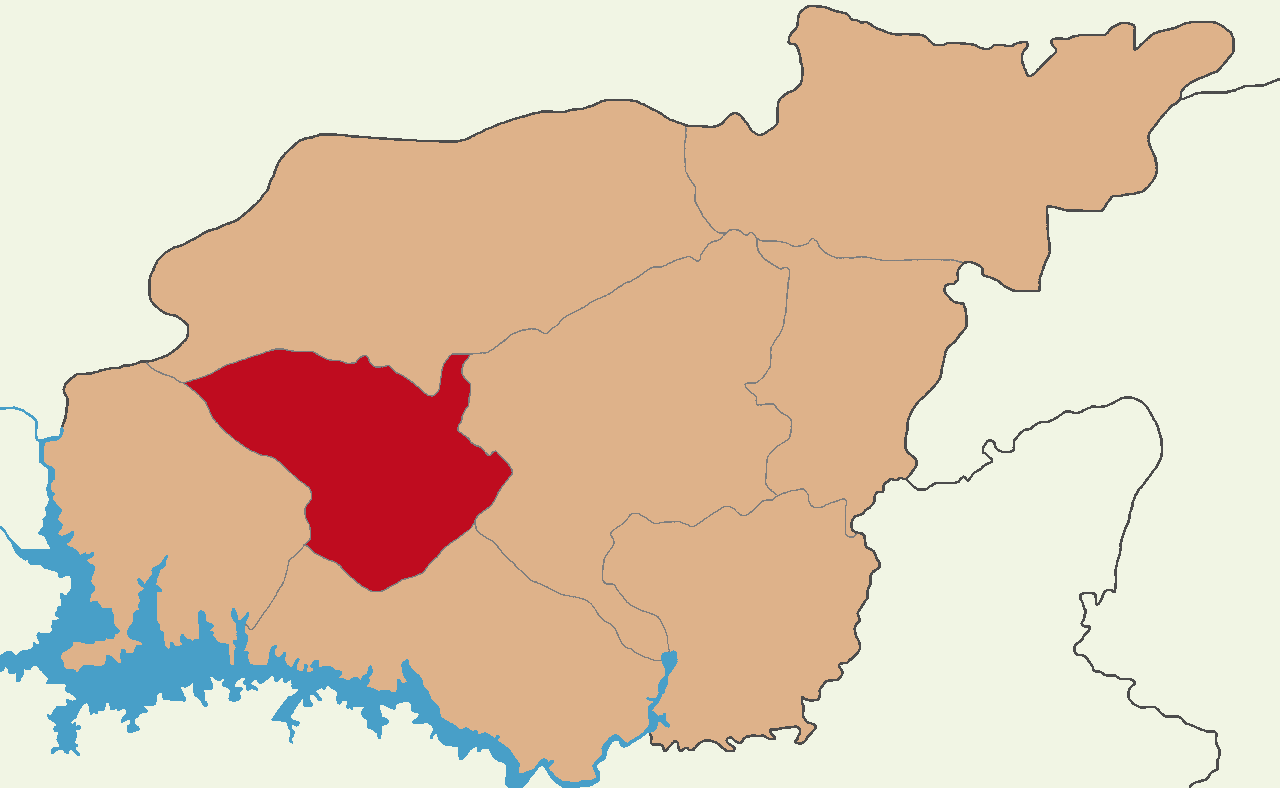
- Map showing Hozat District in Tunceli Province

- Location in Turkey
- Coordinates: 39°06′N 39°13′E
- Country: Turkey
- Province: Tunceli
- Seat: Hozat
- Area: 663 km^{2} (256 sq mi)
- Population (2021): 5,590
  - Density: 8.4/km^{2} (22/sq mi)
- Time zone: UTC+3 (TRT)
- Website: www.hozat.gov.tr

Hozat District is a district of Tunceli Province in Turkey. The town of Hozat is its seat and the district had a population of 5,590 in 2021. Its area is 663 km^{2}.

== Composition ==
Beside the town of Hozat, the district encompasses thirty villages and 112 hamlets.

=== Villages ===
1. Akpınar
2. Alancık
3. Altınçevre
4. Balkaynar
5. Beşelma
6. Bilekli
7. Boydaş
8. Buzlupınar
9. Çağlarca
10. Çaytaşı
11. Çığırlı
12. Dalören
13. Dervişcemal
14. Geçimli
15. İnköy
16. Kalecik
17. Karabakır
18. Karacaköy
19. Karaçavuş
20. Kardelen
21. Kavuktepe
22. Koruköy
23. Kozluca
24. Kurukaymak
25. Sarısaltık
26. Taşıtlı
27. Türktaner
28. Uzundal
29. Yenidoğdu
30. Yüceldi
