= Taşıtlı, Hozat =

Village in Tunceli Province, Turkey

Taşıtlı
- Village
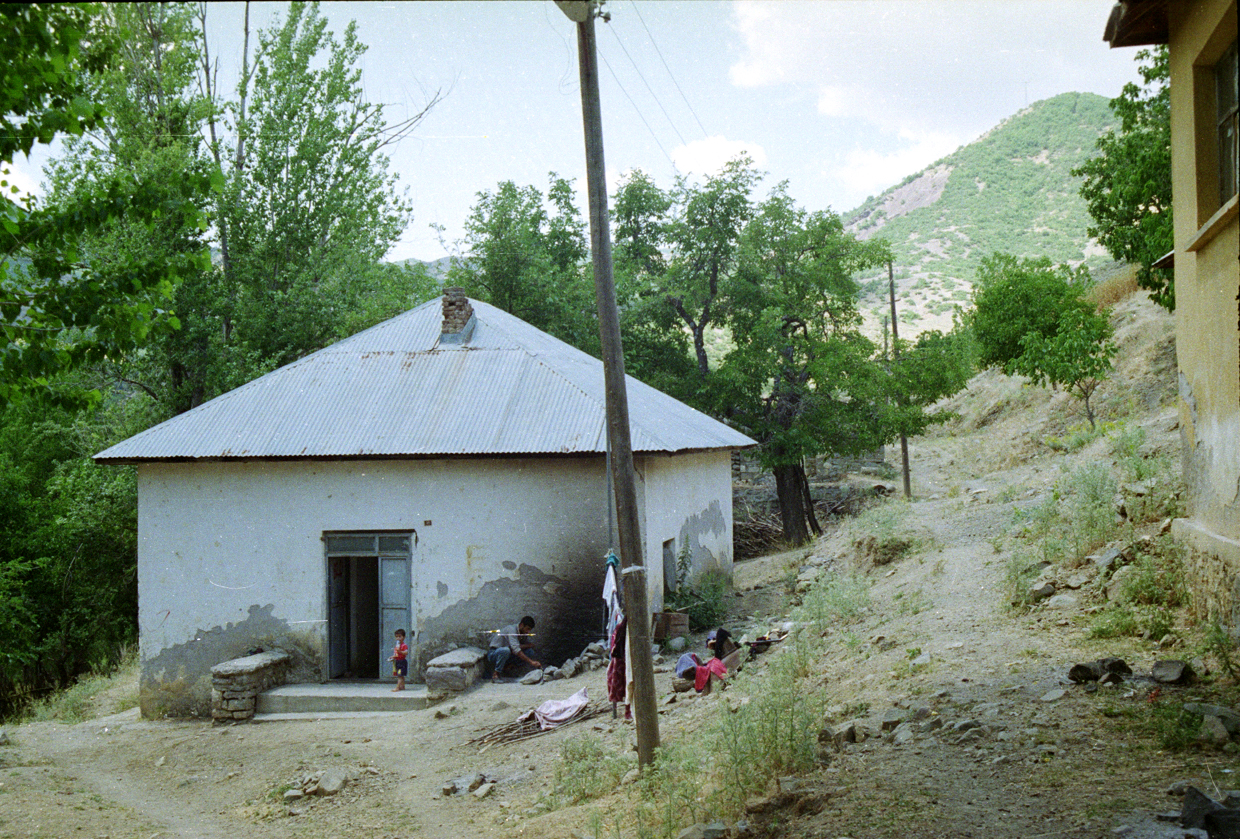

- Location within Turkey
- Coordinates: 39.1719°N 39.3189°E
- Country: Turkey
- Province: Tunceli
- District: Hozat
- Population (2021): 48
- Time zone: UTC+3 (TRT)

Taşıtlı (Kurdish: Torut) is a village in the Hozat District, Tunceli Province, Turkey. The village is populated by Kurds of the Bahtiyar tribe and had a population of 48 in 2021.

The hamlets of Boyalı, Çamyazı, Gözlek, Kızılkom, Kızılmezra, Kızıltaş, Komlar and Şaşaliler are attached are the village.
