= Kavuktepe, Hozat =

Village in Tunceli Province, Turkey

Kavuktepe
- Village
- Location within Turkey
- Coordinates: 39.0994°N 39.1223°E
- Country: Turkey
- Province: Tunceli
- District: Hozat
- Population (2021): 58
- Time zone: UTC+3 (TRT)

Kavuktepe (Kurdish: Geviç) is a village in the Hozat District, Tunceli Province, Turkey. The village is populated by Kurds of the Karabal tribe and had a population of 58 in 2021.

The hamlets of Küllük and Yorganlı are attached to the village.
