= Geçimli, Hozat =

Village in Tunceli Province, Turkey

Geçimli
- Village
- Location within Turkey
- Coordinates: 39.031°N 39.265°E
- Country: Turkey
- Province: Tunceli
- District: Hozat
- Population (2021): 83
- Time zone: UTC+3 (TRT)

Geçimli (Kurdish: Ergan) is a village in the Hozat District, Tunceli Province, Turkey. The village is populated by Kurds of the Abasan tribe and had a population of 83 in 2021.

The hamlets of Dikenli, Esenli and Meşeli are attached to the village.
