= Uzundal, Hozat =

Village in Tunceli Province, Turkey

Uzundal
- Village
- Location within Turkey
- Coordinates: 39.1597°N 39.2585°E
- Country: Turkey
- Province: Tunceli
- District: Hozat
- Population (2021): 10
- Time zone: UTC+3 (TRT)

Uzundal (Kurdish: Hoşan) is a village in the Hozat District, Tunceli Province, Turkey. The village is populated by Kurds of the Bahtiyar tribe and had a population of 10 in 2021.

The hamlet of Bulgurlu is attached to the village.
