= Bilekli, Hozat =

Village in Tunceli Province, Turkey

Bilekli
- Village
- Location within Turkey
- Coordinates: 39.2201°N 39.1667°E
- Country: Turkey
- Province: Tunceli
- District: Hozat
- Population (2021): 20
- Time zone: UTC+3 (TRT)

Bilekli (Kurdish: Miksor) is a village in the Hozat District, Tunceli Province, Turkey. The village is populated by Kurds of the Laçin tribe and had a population of 20 in 2021.
