= Türktaner, Hozat =

Village in Tunceli Province, Turkey

Türktaner
- Village
- Location within Turkey
- Coordinates: 39.1230°N 39.1639°E
- Country: Turkey
- Province: Tunceli
- District: Hozat
- Population (2021): 91
- Time zone: UTC+3 (TRT)

Türktaner (Kurdish: Tanêr) is a village in the Hozat District, Tunceli Province, Turkey. The village is populated by Kurds of the Karabal tribe and had a population of 91 in 2021.

The hamlets of Akpınar, Melecik and Ödemiş are attached are the village.

== Notable people ==
- Besê Hozat
