= Dalören, Hozat =

Village in Tunceli Province, Turkey

Dalören
- Village
- Location within Turkey
- Coordinates: 39.1507°N 39.2888°E
- Country: Turkey
- Province: Tunceli
- District: Hozat
- Population (2021): 53
- Time zone: UTC+3 (TRT)

Dalören (Kurdish: Pakire) is a village in the Hozat District, Tunceli Province, Turkey. The village is populated by Kurds of the Bahtiyar tribe and had a population of 53 in 2021.

The hamlets of Akbulut, Faruklar and Kanlı is attached are the village.
