= Altınçevre, Hozat =

Village in Tunceli Province, Turkey

Altınçevre
- Village
- Location within Turkey
- Coordinates: 39.028°N 39.243°E
- Country: Turkey
- Province: Tunceli
- District: Hozat
- Population (2021): 96
- Time zone: UTC+3 (TRT)

Altınçevre (Kurdish: Încîga) is a village in the Hozat District, Tunceli Province, Turkey. The village is populated by Kurds of the Karabal tribe and by Turks. It had a population of 96 in 2021.
