= Alancık, Hozat =

Village in Tunceli Province, Turkey

Alancık
- Village
- Location within Turkey
- Coordinates: 39.084°N 39.259°E
- Country: Turkey
- Province: Tunceli
- District: Hozat
- Population (2021): 60
- Time zone: UTC+3 (TRT)

Alancık (Kurdish: Pixamî) is a village in the Hozat District of Tunceli Province, Turkey. The village is populated by Kurds of the Karabal tribe and had a population of 60 in 2021.

The village includes the hamlets of Alancik and Yoğuntoprak.
