= Yenidoğdu, Hozat =

Village in Tunceli Province, Turkey

Yenidoğdu
- Village
- Location within Turkey
- Coordinates: 39.033°N 39.197°E
- Country: Turkey
- Province: Tunceli
- District: Hozat
- Population (2021): 156
- Time zone: UTC+3 (TRT)

Yenidoğdu, formerly Sorpiyan, (Kurdish: Kilise) is a village in the Hozat District, Tunceli Province, Turkey. The village is populated by Kurds of the Ferhadan tribe and had a population of 156 in 2021.

The hamlets of Arpalı, Çalıkuşu, İncecik, Kuruovacık are attached to the village.
