= Kurukaymak, Hozat =

Village in Tunceli Province, Turkey

Kurukaymak
- Village
- Location within Turkey
- Coordinates: 39.2071°N 39.1288°E
- Country: Turkey
- Province: Tunceli
- District: Hozat
- Population (2022): 6
- Time zone: UTC+3 (TRT)

Kurukaymak (Kurdish: Qewxe) is a village in the Hozat District, Tunceli Province, Turkey. The village is populated by Kurds of the Qoçan tribe and had a population of six in 2022. No population was registered in the village between 2007 and 2021.

The hamlets of Doğyurdu, Kapıkaya, Yanıktaş and Yeşerti are attached to the village.

== History ==
The village was depopulated by the Turkish authorities in the 1990s and only recently has the locals been allowed to return.
