= Nuriye Kesbir =

Kurdish politician

- Born: 20 June 1948 (age 78)
- Other name: Sozdar Avesta
- Years active: 1973–2025
- Organization: Kurdistan Union of Communities
- Known for: Denied extradition from the Netherlands to Turkey
- Political party: Kurdistan Workers' Party
- Opponent: Turkish Government

Nuriye Kesbir (also known as Sozdar Avesta; born 20 June 1948) is a member of the Kurdistan Workers' Party (PKK) and also of the presidential council of Kurdistan Union of Communities (KCK).

== Biography ==
In 2001 she was arrested upon her arrival at the Schiphol Airport in the Netherlands and following Turkey demanded her extradition for alleged war crimes. The Dutch Minister of Justice Piet Hein Donner initially wanted to allow the extradition but Kesbir challenged the decision in the courts. The Human Rights Watch, in an open letter to Piet Hein Donner, demanded that the Netherlands withhold from an extradition to Turkey, due to concerns she might be tortured. Other human rights organizations, including the United Nations (UN) also appealed to the Dutch Government to halt the extradition. On 20 January 2005, a court in the Netherlands decided not to allow extradition due to concerns she would be tortured in Turkish detention and Kesbir was released the same day. After her release the Dutch Government challenged the ruling, appealing at the Supreme Court. On 15 September 2006, the appeal was denied, upholding the decision of the lower court. In September 2005 the Turkish Government asked the United States to include Nuriye Kesbir in their joint efforts to contain the PKK activity in Western Europe. Her request for asylum in the Netherlands was halted based on the exclusion clause of article 1F of the refugee convention. The decision of the Dutch Immigration Service was upheld by the court and the higher court for asylum cases. After the denial of her asylum request, she returned to Iraq. In 2013, she was elected as one of the six members of the presidential council of the Kurdistan Union of Communities (KCK). She is a defender of the rights of the Yazidi and the philosophy of Abdullah Öcalan.

== Legal prosecution in Turkey ==
In August 2015, an arrest warrant was issued over Interpol against her and 48 alleged members of the PKK accusing them with attempting to establish a Kurdistan in parts of Turkey and disrupting the unity of the (Turkish) state. In 2021, she was included in the investigations of the Kobani trial, in which the defendants of which many are politicians of the Peoples' Democratic Party (HDP) are accused with organizing protests against the Islamic State besieging Kobani. During the protests people died and the defendants are blamed for the deaths by the prosecution.

== Movie ==
Annegriet Wietsma produced a movie about her called "Sozdar, she who lives her promise".
