= Yüceldi, Hozat =

Village in Tunceli Province, Turkey

Yüceldi
- Village
- Location within Turkey
- Coordinates: 39.2026°N 39.2325°E
- Country: Turkey
- Province: Tunceli
- District: Hozat
- Population (2021): 21
- Time zone: UTC+3 (TRT)

Yüceldi, formerly known as Hamzapınar, (Kurdish: Sirtikan) is a village in the Hozat District, Tunceli Province, Turkey. The village is populated by Kurds of the Bahtiyar tribe and had a population of 21 in 2021.

The hamlets of Ağırbaşak, Çalıcık, Çat, Kasımlar, Koçmezrası, Özveren and Yenice are attached to the village.
