= Boydaş, Hozat =

Village in Tunceli Province, Turkey

Boydaş
- Village
- Location within Turkey
- Coordinates: 39.1473°N 39.1271°E
- Country: Turkey
- Province: Tunceli
- District: Hozat
- Population (2022): 0
- Time zone: UTC+3 (TRT)

Boydaş (Kurdish: Şamoşî) is a village in the Hozat District, Tunceli Province, Turkey. The village was unpopulated as of 2022.

The hamlets of Aliağa, Aşlama, Avgülü, Boytaşkozluca, Bozan, Dalikhem, Damlacık, Değirmendere, Dereköy, Dursunderesi, Gangırus, Hanımlar, Kaş, Kızılkum, Kozluca, Odunlu, Oğulcuk, Ormanyolu, Ortaköy, Oymaklı, Sakaltutan, Sapanca, Tekneli, Toptaş, Uzuntarla, Veliağa, Yağcılar and Yenibaş are attached to the village.

== Population ==
The village was populated by Kurds of the Ferhadan tribe but depopulated in the 1990s by Turkish authorities.

The village had a population of 13 in 2020, 15 in 2019, 1 in 2018 and unpopulated in 2017.
