= Kurdistan Communities Union =

Kurdish political organization

Kurdistan Communities Union Koma Civakên Kurdistanê (KCK)

Leadership
- Honorary leader: Abdullah Öcalan
- Co-President of Legislative Council: Remzi Kartal
- Co-President of Legislative Council: Hacer Zagros
- Co-Chairperson of Executive Council: Bese Hozat
- Co-Chairperson of the Executive Council: Cemil Bayık

Structure
- Political groups: Kurdistan Workers' Party (Northern Kurdistan (Turkey)); Democratic Union Party (Western Kurdistan (Syria)); Kurdistan Free Life Party (Eastern Kurdistan (Iran))

Website
- https://kck-info.com

The Kurdistan Communities Union (Kurdish: Koma Civakên Kurdistanê, KCK) is a Kurdish political organization committed to implementing Abdullah Öcalan's ideology of democratic confederalism. The KCK also serves as an umbrella group for several confederalist political parties of Kurdistan, including the Kurdish militant political organization and armed guerrilla movement Kurdistan Workers' Party (PKK), Democratic Union Party (PYD), Kurdistan Free Life Party (PJAK), and Kurdistan Democratic Solution Party (PÇDK).

== Structure ==
Diagram of Kurdish organisations and their relations

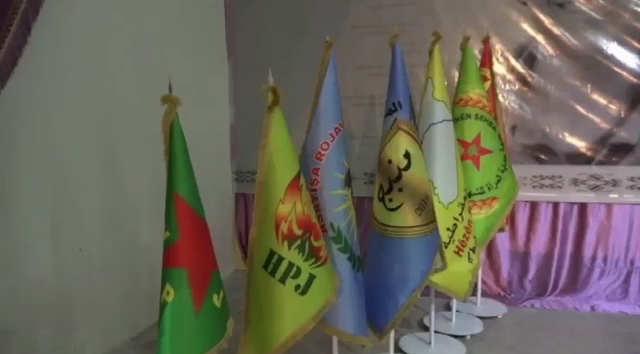
Flags of several KCK-affiliated groups during a conference in Kobanî, 2017

KCK contract defines the highest authority of the organization in Article 11 as follows:

The Founder and Leader of Kurdistan Democratic Society Confederalism is Abdullah Öcalan. He is the philosophical, theoretical and strategic theorist of democracy based on ecology and gender freedom. He is the leadership institution that represents the entire people in every field. He oversees the fundamental policies regarding the free and democratic life of the people of Kurdistan, and is the final decision-maker on fundamental issues. He oversees the compliance of Kongra Gel General Assembly decisions with the line of the democratic, ecological and gender freedom revolution. He appoints the President of the Executive Council. He approves the Executive Council decisions on key issues.

Although Abdullah Öcalan is the group's leader, due to his imprisonment the organization is led by an assembly called Kurdistan People's Congress (Kongra-Gel), which serves as the group's legislature. The co-presidents of the Kongra-Gel are Remzi Kartal and Hacer Zagros. The Assembly elects a 31-person Executive Council. The first Chairman of this Executive Council was Murat Karayılan, while Cemil Bayık was the Executive Council's vice-president. In the General Assembly of the PKK in July 2013, the KCK's executive leadership was restructured. In place of the old position of a single chairperson, a dual co-chair system was implemented, with one position reserved for a man and the other for a woman. Cemil Bayık and Bese Hozat took these new positions, while Karayılan was made commander-in-chief of the People's Defence Forces (HPG), the PKK's official armed wing. The Presidential Council has six members, an equal number of men and women: Cemal Bayık, Sozdar Avesta, Murat Karyılan, Mustafa Karasu, Bese Hozat and Elif Pazarcik.

There are several subdivisions of the KCK: the ideological centre, the social and cultural centre, the political centre, the ecology centre, the economic centre and the Free Society centre. Each centre has several committees which are responsible to implement the resolutions of the Kongra-Gel. There also exists an autonomous Peoples Protections centre.

As Article 21 of the KCK contract details, provincial-regional assemblies come into being in compliance with the geographical and ethno-cultural characteristics of the countries in which they operate. Within the scope of the KCK formation, Turkey has been divided into four province-regions. These are namely, Çukurova (one of the provinces in the eastern Mediterranean part of Turkey), Amed (in Diyarbakir, one of the provinces in southeastern Anatolia), Serhat (Erzurum, one of the provinces in the eastern part of Turkey) and the Aegean region. There are also urban assemblies, the formations that report to the People's Assemblies that operate in cities, and organizations of towns and quarters that are the groups that carry out the actions in towns and quarters.

=== Komalen Jinen Kurdistan ===
Within the KCK is the Komalen Jinen Kurdistan (KJK), or Confederation of Women in Kurdistan, which is the women's movement.

== Ideology ==
The philosophy of the KCK is described in the foreword to the agreement (sözleşme) that the Kurdistan People's Congress (Kongra-Gel) accepted on 17 May 2005. It was written by the leader of the PKK, Abdullah Öcalan on March 20, 2005. Having described the need for a democratic confederalism, Öcalan went on to say:

The democratic confederalism of Kurdistan is not a State system, it is the democratic system of a people without a State ... It takes its power from the people and adopts to reach self sufficiency in every field including economy. The democratic confederalism is the movement of the Kurdish people to found their own democracy and organize their own social system ... The democratic confederalism is the expression of the democratic union of the Kurdish people that have been split into four parts and have spread all over the world ... It develops the (notion of) a democratic nation instead of the nationalist-statist nation based on strict borders.

Abdullah Öcalan advocated for the implementation of "radical democracy" in the KCK. Murat Karayılan, the head of the KCK after Öcalan, explained the principle of democratic con-federalism in his book Bir Savaşın Anatomisi (Anatomy of a War):

The alternative is the independent self-declaration of the democratic confederal system. ... The society should be independent, the nation should be independent. Yet, the main purpose should be for independent nations to form a democratic nation community together and based on equality, within a confederal system ... It is a system of partnering, where various cultures live together. The aim is a "union of equity and free will".

The ideology of democratic confederalism draws heavily on theories of libertarian municipalism, social ecology, and Communalism developed by American post-anarchist and political philosopher Murray Bookchin, whose works Öcalan read and adapted for the Kurdish movement in the early 2000s while in prison. Öcalan has even described himself as a "student" of Bookchin, and the PKK hailed the American thinker as "one of the greatest social scientists of the 20th century" when he died in 2006.

=== Political representation ===
In addition to the PKK, political parties such as the PJAK (Partiya Jiyana Azad a Kurdistanê - The Free Life Party of Kurdistan, in Kurdish) are active in Iran and the PYD (Partiya Yekiti a Demokratik - Democratic Union Party, in Kurdish) active in Syria, as well as civil society organizations. In Iraq the party is called the PÇDK (Partiya Çaresera Demokratik Kurdistan - Kurdistan Democratic Solution Party, in Kurdish).

== Peoples protections centre ==
This centre is responsible for providing training to the armed forces in order to provide security to the citizens of the KCK.

Some of the armed forces within the KCK are the People's Defense Forces (HPG), the Free Women's Units (YJA) and the Civil Protections Units(YPS) the People's Protection Units (YPG) and the Women's Protections Units (YPJ).

== History ==
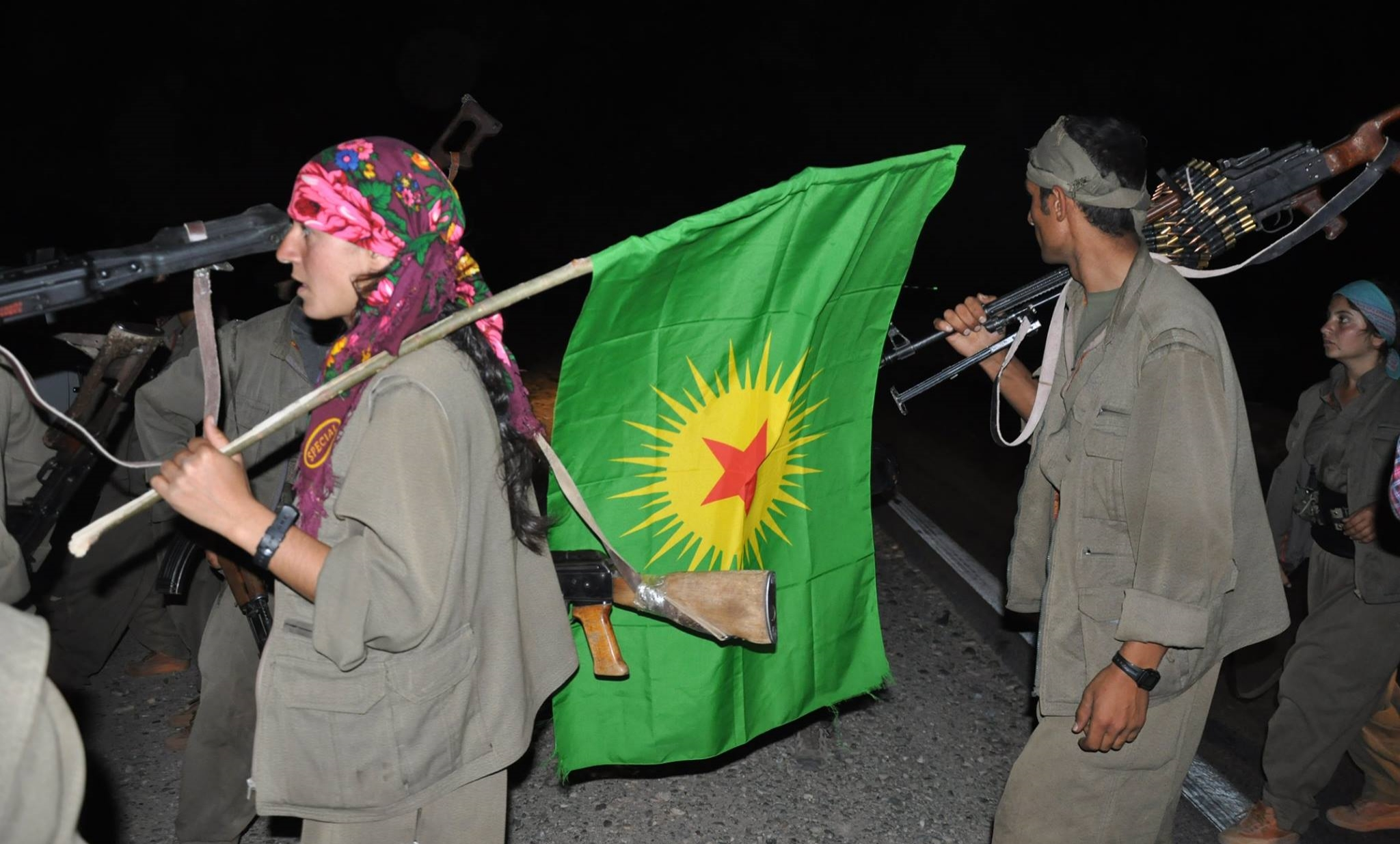
PKK militants with KCK flag in Kirkuk, 2014

The idea of the KCK was proposed at the 5th Congress of the Kongra-Gel (Kongra Gelê Kurdistan – Kurdistan People's Congress) held in Qandil in May 2007, and it replaced the KKK, which had been in existence since 2005. The KKK, standing for Koma Komalên Kurdistanê, was established at the Kongra-Gel's 3rd Congress in Qandil with 236 delegates in May 2005, in accordance with Öcalan's concept of democratic confederalism. At the 3rd Congress of Kongra-Gel, at which the KKK was established, the organizational chart identified a Kongra-Gel Presidency Council of five individuals, eleven Permanent Commissions, a Court of Justice of seven individuals, and a KKK Executive Council Presidency of seven individuals. In this 3rd Congress, Zübeyir Aydar was made the Kongra-Gel President, and Murat Karayılan was appointed as President of the KKK Executive Council.

In May 2007, at the 5th Congress in Qandil attended by 213 members representing the Kurds in Turkey, Iran, Syria, Iraq and abroad, the KKK's name was changed to the KCK. The KCK was envisaged as an umbrella organization covering the Kurds of Turkey, Iran, Iraq and Syria, as opposed to the Turkey-focused organization of the KKK.

== Detentions and court cases of alleged members ==
Between April 2009 and October 2010 some 1,800 people were detained by Turkey on charges of being members of KCK. Most of them were politicians active in the then closed down Democratic Society Party (DTP) or the Peace and Democracy Party (BDP). Trade unionists and human rights defenders have also been among the detainees.

At the beginning of October 2011, there had been 7,748 detentions since April 2009, of whom 3,895 suspects were placed in pre-trial detention. 4,148 detentions had been reported in just the past six months, resulting in 1,548 arrest warrants. In an answer to the progress report of the European Union of 12 October 2011, The Turkish Interior Ministry announced on 14 October 2011 that a total of 605 people suspected of membership of KCK remained in pre-trial detention. By July 2012, the Democratic Turkey Forum had identified 54 trials against alleged members of KCK, involving 1,818 defendants, some 800 of them in pre-trial detention. A different count on detentions and arrests lead to an estimate of 4,250 detentions and 2,400 arrests in three years.

Most suspects have been charged with membership of an illegal organization under Article 314 of the Turkish Penal Code. Special heavy penal courts in various cities such as İzmir, Adana, Erzurum and Diyarbakir are conducting trials against groups from different towns.

=== The main trial in Diyarbakir ===
On 18 October 2010, the main trial started at Diyarbakir Heavy Penal Court No. 6. It involved 151 defendants, 103 of them in pre-trial detention. The 7578-page indictment was prepared in 15 months. The detainees requested that they be allowed to defend themselves in Kurdish during the trial. The court rejected the request.

After 14 hearings Diyarbakir Heavy Penal Court No. 6 adjourned the case on 11 November 2010 to 13 January 2011. It did not allow the defendants to testify in Kurdish pointing at a decision of Diyarbakir Heavy Penal Court No. 4 of 10 November 2010 stating that the defendants should not be allowed to speak Kurdish since they had testified to the police and the arresting judge in Turkish. The trial continued in 2011 and 2012. On 19 June 2012 another hearing was held, while the number of defendants still was 152 (99 of them pre-trial detention) and 19 "on the run". In March 2017, 111 of the defendants were sentenced to prison terms, ranging from 14 months to 21 years imprisonment. Ahmet Türk, a former mayor of Mardin was sentenced to 15 months and Hatip Dicle the co-chair of the Democratic Society Congress (DTK) to 9 years imprisonment. 16 of the defendants were sentenced to 21 years while 43 were found not guilty.

=== The trials in Istanbul ===
At the end of 2011 waves of detentions of alleged KCK member were reported from Istanbul and related areas. It took quite some time to prepare the relevant indictments. In March 2012 the 2400-page indictment against 193 people -147 of the pre-trial detainees- was sent to Istanbul Heavy Penal Court No. 15. Istanbul Heavy Penal Court No. 16 accepted indictment against 50 defendants (almost all of them lawyers) on 18 April 2012. In the case of the journalists Istanbul Heavy Penal Court No. 15 accepted indictment on 11 May 2012 and scheduled the first hearing for 10 September 2012.

When the main trial in Istanbul started the number of defendants had increased to 205, 140 of them in pre-trial detention. On the second day a speaker from the national TV and radio stations TRT started to read a 133-page summary of the indictment. After the 8th session Istanbul Heavy Penal Court 15 decided on a lengthy break until 1 November 2012 and ordered the release of 16 defendants, including Prof. Dr. Büşra Ersanlı. In April 2012 15 defendants including the publisher and human rights activist Ragıp Zarakolu had been released.

On 16 July 2012 Istanbul Heavy Penal Court 16 started to hear the case of 50 defendants, 46 of them lawyers and 36 of them in pre-trial detention. The 892 page indictment accuses the defendants to have formed a "committee of the leadership" (tr: Önderlik Komitesi) and asked for sentences between 7.5 and 22.5 years' imprisonment. After the third session the court released nine defendants and adjourned the hearing to 6 November 2012.

=== Other trials ===
As of July 2012, at least 13 trials have resulted in verdicts. One of them referred to 31 trade unionists of the Confederation of Public Workers' Unions (KESK). Most of them belonged to the teachers' union Eğitim-Sen. They had been detained in and around İzmir in May 2010, but released pending trial. On 28 November 2011, İzmir Heavy Penal Court passed its verdict and sentenced 25 defendants to 6 years, 3 months' imprisonment. Five defendants were acquitted. A minor KCK trial was held in Ağrı, 18 people were arrested on the 18 February 2010 and subsequently tried and 11 of them were sentenced on the 14 June 2011. Hamit Duman was sentenced to 16 years, and 3 people to 13 years imprisonment. 3 people (amongst them Yusuf Yilmaz, former mayor of Patnos) were sentenced to 6 years and 3 months and 2 BDP party chairs were sentenced to 7 years 6 months. All of them were charged with being a "member of an illegal organization". 2 people were sentenced to 10 months for "making "propaganda for an illegal organization". Until July 2012, 155 defendants had been convicted to sentences varying between 1 year, 6 months' and life imprisonment. In some cases the Court of Cassation has upheld verdict of the lower courts. The 9th Penal Chamber of the Court of Cassation stated in its verdict that the KCK is acting with the aim of turning the PKK terrorist organization into a separate state structure. The verdict stated that the KCK is regarded as the political branch of the PKK.

== Criticism of the judicial procedures ==
The trials raised a series of fair trial concerns common to cases involving terrorism charges, including prolonged pre-trial detention and limitations on access by defendants and their lawyers to the evidence against them. Frequent use of arrests instead of judicial supervision, limited access to files, failure to give detailed grounds for detention decisions and revisions of such decisions highlight the need to bring the Turkish criminal justice system into line with international standards and to amend the anti-terror legislation. The detention of elected representatives is a challenge to local government and hampers dialogue on the Kurdish issue. The evidence against the defendants is largely based on wiretaps, surveillance of an office some of the accused frequented, intercepted email correspondence, and testimony from secret witnesses. However, there is scant evidence to suggest the defendants engaged in any acts that could be defined as terrorism as it is understood in international law. Prosecutions brought under anti-terrorism legislation have frequently been based on secret witness testimony that cannot be examined by defense lawyers. On 15 April 2011 the Joint Platform for Human Rights (formed by the Human Rights Association (HRA), the Association of Helsinki Citizens and the Turkish section of Amnesty International) issued a report on the trial in Diyarbakir. It concluded that the defense of human rights is under threat of criminal investigations, that the accused could not use their native language, and that the privacy of communication was under threat.
