= Balkaynar, Hozat =

Village in Tunceli Province, Turkey

Balkaynar
- Village
- Location within Turkey
- Coordinates: 39.1210°N 39.2593°E
- Country: Turkey
- Province: Tunceli
- District: Hozat
- Population (2021): 56
- Time zone: UTC+3 (TRT)

Balkaynar (Kurdish: Cemolar) is a village in the Hozat District, Tunceli Province, Turkey. The village is populated by Kurds of the Abasan tribe and had a population of 56 in 2021.

The hamlets of Demirkol, Gülenli and Seyitmenler are attached to the village.
