= Çağlarca, Hozat =

Village in Tunceli Province, Turkey

Çağlarca
- Village
- Location within Turkey
- Coordinates: 39.035°N 39.141°E
- Country: Turkey
- Province: Tunceli
- District: Hozat
- Population (2021): 136
- Time zone: UTC+3 (TRT)

Çağlarca (Kurdish: Peyik) is a village in the Hozat District, Tunceli Province, Turkey. The village is populated by Kurds of the Ferhadan tribe and had a population of 136 in 2021.

The hamlets of Erenler, Hopağaç, Sütpınar and Üzümlü are attached to the village.
