= İnköy, Hozat =

Village in Tunceli Province, Turkey

İnköy
- Village
- Location within Turkey
- Coordinates: 39.060°N 39.246°E
- Country: Turkey
- Province: Tunceli
- District: Hozat
- Population (2021): 231
- Time zone: UTC+3 (TRT)

İnköy (Kurdish: În) is a village in the Hozat District, Tunceli Province, Turkey. The village is populated by Kurds of the Karabal tribe and had a population of 231 in 2021.
