= Sarısaltık, Hozat =

Village in Tunceli Province, Turkey

Sarısaltık
- Village
- Location within Turkey
- Coordinates: 39.1781°N 39.2415°E
- Country: Turkey
- Province: Tunceli
- District: Hozat
- Population (2021): 57
- Time zone: UTC+3 (TRT)

Sarısaltık (Kurdish: Derik) is a village in the Hozat District, Tunceli Province, Turkey. The village is populated by Kurds of the Bahtiyar tribe and had a population of 57 in 2021.

The hamlets of Akören, Akseki, Amaçlı, Derindere, Işıklar, Köybaşı, Maşa and Salkımlı are attached to the village.
