= Beşelma, Hozat =

Village in Tunceli Province, Turkey

Beşelma
- Village
- Location within Turkey
- Coordinates: 39.1407°N 39.2712°E
- Country: Turkey
- Province: Tunceli
- District: Hozat
- Population (2021): 21
- Time zone: UTC+3 (TRT)

Beşelma (Kurdish: Hopik) is a village in the Hozat District, Tunceli Province, Turkey. The village is populated by Kurds of the Bahtiyar tribe and had a population of 21 in 2021.

The hamlet of Darıkolu is attached to the village.
