= Karaçavuş, Hozat =

Village in Tunceli Province, Turkey

Karaçavuş
- Village
- Location within Turkey
- Coordinates: 39.1135°N 39.1156°E
- Country: Turkey
- Province: Tunceli
- District: Hozat
- Population (2021): 39
- Time zone: UTC+3 (TRT)

Karaçavuş (Kurdish: Zakirek) is a village in the Hozat District, Tunceli Province, Turkey. The village is populated by Kurds of the Karabal tribe and had a population of 39 in 2021.

The hamlets of Altınbaş, Çevreli, Dayılar, Esenevler, Kumrular and Sütlüce are attached to the village.
