= Besê Hozat =

Kurdish politician

Co-chair of the Kurdistan Communities Union
- Incumbent
- Assumed office 6 July 2013 Serving with Cemil Bayik
- Preceded by: Murat Karayılan

Personal details
- Born: Hülya Oran; 12 November 1978 (age 47) Türktaner, Hozat, Tunceli

Besê Hozat (born Hülya Oran on 12 November 1978 in Hozat, Tunceli) is a leader in the Kurdistan Workers' Party (Partiya Karkerên Kurdistanê, PKK) and is the co-chair of the Kurdistan Communities Union (Koma Civakên Kurdistan, KCK) alongside Cemil Bayik. She is the sixth member of the General Presidential Council, the highest authoritative body in the PKK.

== Early life ==
Born in 1978 in Tunceli Province, Hozat was the seventh of nine children. She attended primary school in Tanêr and secondary school in Kayseri, where she experienced discrimination as a Kurdish Alevi. According to Hozat, Alevism and Dersimilik were viewed with scorn and marginalization. To escape this treatment, she joined radical left organizations affiliated with Abdullah Ocalan.

Bese Hozat's family was a victim in the 1938 Dersim rebellion, which she called a "genocide." She shared that many members of her family were killed, including her grandfather, her father's wife and children, while her grandmother barely escaped. These events shaped Hozat's consciousness, creating feelings of hatred and anger towards the state.

Hozat's interest in the PKK grew during her high school years, influenced in part by Abdullah Ocalan's articles published under the pen name 'Ali Firat' in the Özgur Halk newspaper. In 1994, she joined the PKK in the mountains of Tunceli Province, taking on the name Bese Hozat the same name as the wife of Seyid Riza, the leader of the Dersim rebellion.

== Leadership in the PKK and feminism ==
Bese Hozat stayed in the Tunceli countryside for around four years and was a part of many actions. Her sister was killed in 1997. Her father, Hasan Oran, was traumatized by the death of Bese Hozat's sister and decided to withdraw from the Qandil mountains. Throughout her time in the PKK, Bese Hozat served at management level, and has been affiliated with many women's organizations within the PKK. One of Bese's main objectives was to preside over arming and training women within the organization. She was outspoken about the need for more female representation in the PKK.

At the Kongra-Gel congress held from the 30 June to the 5 July 2013, Bese Hozat and Cemil Bayik, were elected as the co-chairs of the Executive Council of the Kurdistan Communities Union (KCK), replacing Murat Karayılan. The KCK is an umbrella organization that includes the PKK. Bese Hozat's election as the first woman in a leadership position in the KCK was seen as strengthening the women's movement within it.

She says that the PKK is a woman's party and that Abdullah Öcalan had made PKK ideology so that it was against gender inequality. After the Kurdish Women's Movement's sixth General Assembly, they concluded that women need to be in leadership roles in democratic institutions and that for too long men have dominated leadership positions. She said that "There is a very violent struggle within us. An ideological war based on the equality of both sexes determines the main axis of our struggle. So as an organization, we believe that if a woman in a society is not free, that society is not free. If you say free society, then those two sexes will be free, those two sexes will be equal, recognize each others will, respect each other, love each other correctly. The model we developed in the organization is one such model."

The General Assembly also said that men in leadership roles were too individualistic and that women naturally are more social, communal, and democratic then men. Bese Hozat agreed with the General Assembly and went on to say that "education has an unquestionable role in the liberation of women for it helps people to become conscious which is a must for the attainment of free will and liberation from slavery. This is in direct contrast to what Hozat claims about the Turkish government. Hozat says that after the Justice and Development Party (AKP) asserted control after the failed 2016 coup attempt, the Turkish government has been increasingly dominated by males and religious fundamentalists.

== Views on Iraqi Kurdistan and the nation-state ==
Hozat has been a very outspoken critic of the nation-state and supported the PKK abandoning its plan for an independent Kurdistan. When Bese Hozat was asked by the New Internationalist what she thought about the referendum on Kurdish independence in September 2017, she said that "our movement's approach is not about building a state - a state system will not be to the benefit of the Kurdish people but a thorn in the side."

She continues saying that "A Kurdish state will never be a solution to the Kurdish question. It would deepen the fight with our neighbors and bring decades of war against the Arab as well as chaos and suffering", and that "the era of nation-state is over. A state does not buy freedom because it's a bourgeoisie system that enforces repression on the people by an elite." Bese Hozat also criticized Masoud Barzani, the leader of the Kurdistan Democratic Party (KDP) which called the referendum. She argues that the KDP are too centralized and that they were blackmailing the Kurdish population in South Kurdistan by telling them to support the independence referendum.

Hozat claims that the referendum was called was because of the Iraqi Kurdish Parliament not having any power and that the people of Iraqi Kurdistan are facing grave economic and social problems. She thinks that Recep Tayyip Erdoğan and Barzani are too close and that Turkey's ruling Justice and Development Party (AKP) needs the KDP's support for crushing the Kurdish population. Hozat further asserts that "Barzani represents the legacy of collaborative Kurds and Turkey, an occupying force." Hozat has also expressed her distaste for borders that are affiliated with nation-states.

In regards to the border of Turkey and Iran, Hozat says that Turkey's attempt to build a wall between Turkey and Iran signifies Turkey's current policies and that "the aspirations of the people for freedom cannot be contained by a wall." Hozat wants the borders between the four parts of Kurdistan to be broken down so that the Kurdish people can truly be free from the nation-states.

Hozat told the New Internationalist that "We're experiencing a third world war in the region" in regards to Turkey. After the failed Kurdish-Turkish peace process in the mid-2010s, the PKK resumed fighting in the region after an attempted coup against Erdoğan. Bese Hozat said that there never was a peace process and that ruling AKP was badly in need of a ceasefire due to a difficult situation both in local and foreign arenas. She accused the AKP of instrumentalizing the peace process to get more sympathy at home and abroad.

Bese Hozat claimed that the PKK kept up their side of the peace process by withdrawing fighters from Turkey and releasing prisoners. When the conflict resumed in 2015, Bese Hozat said that the time had come for a "revolutionary public war." She said that the AKP soon realized that the Kurdish movement was gaining strength in Rojava and that they were gaining international attention for their fight against the Islamic State of Iraq and the Levant and the rescue of thousands of Yazidis after the Sinjar massacre. The AKP was further incentivized not to work with the Kurds after the Turkey's Peoples' Democratic Party (HDP), a party which emphasises Kurdish rights, received 13% of the votes in the June 2015 general election.

== Views of Europe and NATO ==
Hozat says that the European Union (EU) are hypocrites. She says that the EU knows what Turkey is doing to the Kurdish people, but that they do nothing to intervene. Hozat sees European Union–Turkey relations as pragmatic and that they are not doing enough for Kurds in Turkey. Hozat claims that Turkey is "blackmailing Brussels by playing the 'refugee crisis card'" When Erdogan arrested 13 Kurdish oppositions members of the Turkish parliament after the failed 2016 Turkish coup d'état attempt, Hozat says that Europe has been silent about the 2016–present purges in Turkey. She says that "Europe is responsible for the rise of fascism in Turkey because this silence and indifference are indirect support for Turkish policies."

Hozat has also been critical of NATO because of their backing of Turkey. She claims that since the 1980s and 1990s, the Turkish state's strategy for warfare against the Kurds has changed, that it is no longer using as many ground troops and instead are using the Turkish Air Force and other sophisticated weapons against the PKK. Hozat says that now the Kurds are experiencing the most intense kind of warfare from the Turkish government and that NATO is not speaking out.

Hozat has accused NATO and Turkey of being responsible for the murder of Sakine Cansiz (co-founder of the PKK), Fidan Doğan (member of the Kurdistan National Congress), and Leyla Söylemez (member of the Kurdish youth movement) in Paris. Hozat says that the reason why no light has been shed on these murders is that NATO was involved and that Turkey has been using this incident to intimidate Kurdish women.

When Bese Hozat discussed with the New Internationalist what she thought of the United States and Russian relations with the Kurds, she said that "the interest of these two powers is rooted in their regional interests and their plans to redesign the region. They want to minimize the power of traditional region states which are too dogmatic in their positions - because they are an obstacle for global capital."

She says a big reason for why Russia and the United States have started to support the Kurds is because of the Rojava-Islamist conflict. Hozat denies that weapons that the U.S. give to the People's Protection Units (YPG) are going to the PKK in Turkey. Hozat explains that the PKK has never had trouble getting weapons and that the Turkish government is attempting to smear the YPG.

Bese Hozat has claimed that Al Qaeda and the Islamic State of Iraq and the Levant are "instruments created by the capitalist system." Hozat blames the Baathists, the United States, Israel, and the UK for empowering radical fanatic Sunni Islamic groups in order to control the dominant Shia majority in the region after the fall of Saddam Hussein in Iraq. Hozat also blames Turkey, Qatar, and Saudi Arabia for allowing radical Sunni groups to flourish. Along with this, Hozat accused the AKP of collaboration with ISIL and criticised it for trying to dismantle secularism in Turkey.

== Views on Turkish constitutional referendum ==
When Recep Erdogan held a referendum in 2017 that proposed to change Turkey from a parliamentary system to an executive system, Bese Hozat condemned the Constitutional referendum as a power grab by Erdogan and the far-right Nationalist Movement Party (MHP). Bese Hozat said in an interview with Haaretz that changing Turkey to an executive system would embolden the far-right and nationalists in Turkey and incentivize them to do border-crossings in Iraq and Syria. Hozat says that Erdogan is promising stability and an end to terrorism at the cost of more authoritarianism.

Bese Hozat sees the PKK as an influence both regionally and internationally. She says that Democratic Confederalism can be an alternative to the statist government systems.
