= Buzlupınar, Hozat =

Village in Tunceli Province, Turkey

Buzlupınar
- Village
- Location within Turkey
- Coordinates: 39.119°N 39.306°E
- Country: Turkey
- Province: Tunceli
- District: Hozat
- Population (2021): 75
- Time zone: UTC+3 (TRT)

Buzlupınar (Kurdish: Kirnik) is a village in the Hozat District, Tunceli Province, Turkey. The village is populated by Kurds of the Abasan tribe and had a population of 75 in 2021.

The hamlets of Aşağı Buzlupınar and Tokmaklı are attached to the village.
