= Karabakır, Hozat =

Village in Tunceli Province, Turkey

Karabakır
- Village
- Location within Turkey
- Coordinates: 38.994°N 39.213°E
- Country: Turkey
- Province: Tunceli
- District: Hozat
- Population (2021): 121
- Time zone: UTC+3 (TRT)

Karabakır (Kurdish: Barginî) is a village in the Hozat District, Tunceli Province, Turkey. The village is populated by Kurds of the Ferhadan tribe and had a population of 121 in 2021.

The hamlets of Halilağa and Hıdırdamı are attached to the village.
