= Kardelen, Hozat =

Village in Tunceli Province, Turkey

Kardelen
- Village
- Location within Turkey
- Coordinates: 39.087°N 39.184°E
- Country: Turkey
- Province: Tunceli
- District: Hozat
- Population (2021): 85
- Time zone: UTC+3 (TRT)

Kardelen (Kurdish: Tawuge) is a village in the Hozat District, Tunceli Province, Turkey. The village is populated by Kurds of the Karabal tribe and had a population of 85 in 2021.

The hamlet of Aşağı Tavuklar is attached to the village.
