= Dervişcemal, Hozat =

Village in Tunceli Province, Turkey

Dervişcemal
- Village
- Location within Turkey
- Coordinates: 39.100°N 39.283°E
- Country: Turkey
- Province: Tunceli
- District: Hozat
- Population (2021): 72
- Time zone: UTC+3 (TRT)

Dervişcemal (Kurdish: Derwêşcemal) is a village in the Hozat District, Tunceli Province, Turkey. The village is populated by Kurds of Abasan tribe and had a population of 72 in 2021.
