= Kalecik, Hozat =

Village in Tunceli Province, Turkey

Kalecik
- Village
- Location within Turkey
- Coordinates: 39.0526°N 39.1060°E
- Country: Turkey
- Province: Tunceli
- District: Hozat
- Population (2021): 53
- Time zone: UTC+3 (TRT)

Kalecik (Kurdish: Qalacix) is a village in the Hozat District, Tunceli Province, Turkey. The village is populated by Kurds of the Bahtiyar tribe and had a population of 53 in 2021.

The hamlets of Bayram, Gökçe, Karataş and Olucak are attached to the village.
