= Helwah =

Heloueh حلوة Helwah, Helwa
- Village
- Location in Lebanon
- Coordinates: 33°36′39″N 35°59′54″E
- Country: Lebanon
- Governorate: Beqaa Governorate
- District: Rashaya District
- Elevation: 4,760 ft (1,450 m)

Helwah (Arabic: حلوة, romanized: Ḥelwah) is a local authority situated in Rashaya District, Lebanon.

== History ==
In 1838, Eli Smith noted Helwa's population as being Druze.

== Bibliography ==
- Robinson, E.; Smith, E. (1841). Biblical Researches in Palestine, Mount Sinai and Arabia Petraea: A Journal of Travels in the year 1838. Vol. 3. Boston: Crocker & Brewster.
