= Akpınar, Hozat =

Village in Tunceli Province, Turkey

Akpınar
- Village
- Location within Turkey
- Coordinates: 39.000°N 39.183°E
- Country: Turkey
- Province: Tunceli
- District: Hozat
- Population (2021): 75
- Time zone: UTC+3 (TRT)

Akpınar (Kurdish: Hênîyo Sipê) is a village in the Hozat District, Tunceli Province, Turkey. The village is populated by Kurds of the Ferhadan tribe and had a population of 75 in 2021.

The hamlets of Kuşaklı and Kuzuluk are attached to the village. The two hamlets are populated by Kurds of the Karabal tribe.
