= Mustafa Karasu =

Senior commander of the Kurdistan Workers' Party

- Born: 2 January 1950 (age 76); Karapınar, Gürün District, Sivas Province
- Military career
- Allegiance: Kurdistan Workers' Party
- Rank: Deputy Chairman of PKK; Leader of ERNK; Politibureau member KCK executive council member
- Nickname: Huseyin Ali
- Unit: ERNK (previously)
- Conflicts: Kurdish–Turkish conflict

Mustafa Karasu (born 2 January 1950), also known as Huseyin Ali, is a deputy chairman and founder of the Kurdistan Workers' Party (PKK), a Kurdish rebel group fighting an armed insurgency against the government of Turkey for an independent Kurdistan. The group is recognised as a terrorist organisation by Turkey, the United States and EU.

== Biography ==
Karasu was born in Karapınar, Gürün to an Alevi Kurdish family. Along with Cemil Bayık and Duran Kalkan he is viewed as one of the hardliners among the PKK's leadership and is alleged to have links to Iran. He is the leader of the Alevi groups within the PKK. His name was on the list of 248 PKK members of which Turkey wished extradication from Iraq on July 10, 2010.

He was imprisoned for several years after the 1980 Turkish coup d'état, after his release he became a member of the PKK's politburo (leadership council) and led the group's popular front: the ERNK. After working in the PKK's political wing for 3 years, in Europe he was called back to South-Eastern Turkey by Abdullah Ocalan to gain more battle experience. He is currently the member of the Executive Council (de facto government) of the Koma Civakên Kurdistan (KCK), which is the PKK's umbrella organisation. He has repeatedly spoken out on the side of the Palestinians when talking about the Israeli–Palestinian conflict.
