= Hozat =

Municipality in Tunceli Province, Turkey

- Municipality
- Location in Turkey
- Coordinates: 39.107°N 39.220°E
- Country: Turkey
- Province: Tunceli
- District: Hozat

Government
  - Mayor: Aydin Kaya (SOL Parti)
- Population (2021): 3,634
- Time zone: UTC+3 (TRT)
- Website: www.hozat.bel.tr

Hozat (Ottoman Turkish: خوزات, Kurdish: Xozat) is a municipality (belde) and seat of Hozat District in Tunceli Province, Turkey. It is populated by Kurds and had a population of 3,634 in 2021.

Seyfi Geyik from the Republican People's Party (CHP) was elected mayor in the local elections in March 2019.

The town is divided into the neighborhoods of Diyap Ağa, Fikripaşa, Köprübaşı and Yenimahalle.

== History ==
In the 10th century, it was known as Chozanon (Greek: Χόζανον), and formed a thema after its conquest by the Byzantine Empire shortly after 938. Near the city are the ruins of the Ergen church which according to Rudaw was erected by Armenians 1300 years ago.
