= Ba'athist Syria–PKK relations =

Throughout the history of Ba'athist Syria, under both Hafez al-Assad and Bashar al-Assad, the relations between the Syrian government and the Kurdistan Workers' Party (PKK) were a major controversy and their relations varied depending on period.

== History ==
=== Cold War ===
When the PKK was founded in 1978, the group received Soviet and Syrian support, including arms and training, as the group was against Turkey, a key NATO member during the Cold War. Soviet support for the PKK ended after the collapse of communism, although the Assad government continued to harbor the group. Syria supported the PKK in the 1980s and 1990s mainly due to tensions with Turkey over the Hatay province, the Southeastern Anatolia Project, and Turkish relations with Israel. On the other hand, Turkey used the Southeastern Anatolia Project to pressure the Syrian government. According to intelligence reports, the relationship between Syria and the PKK lasted from July 1979 until 1998. The governments of Iran, Iraq, and Syria, were all experienced in using the Kurdish separatist groups of their neighboring country as leverage. When the PKK emerged as a significant Kurdish group in Turkey, Syria was the first to take advantage of it. Hafez al-Assad used the PKK not only against Turkey but also against Syrian Kurds. The Syrian government also attempted to dissuade Syrian Kurds from rebelling and redirect their frustration towards Turkey, and the PKK was allowed to freely recruit, despite Kurdish groups being banned in Syria. Abdullah Öcalan was criticized for collaboration with the Syrian government which oppressed the same Kurds who made up a large part of his fighters.

Öcalan retained the PKK camps in Syria around the Gulf War when he started receiving support from the Ba'athist Iraqi government as well. The PKK was also active in Lebanon where their headquarters was known as the Mahsum Korkmaz Academy, which served as a training camp for PKK recruits until Turkey pressured the Syrian government to close it, after which the PKK moved the training camp to Damascus in 1992. Turkey intensified its position against Syrian support of the PKK after 1996. Turkey sent a memorandum to Syria on January 23, 1996, demanding it cut PKK support, and in February 1998, Aykut Çetirge, head of the Middle East department in the Turkish Foreign Ministry, visited Syria to reiterate this demand. When Adnan Omran, the Syrian Foreign Policy Advisor, visited Ankara on July 1, 1997, Korkmaz Haktanır, the Undersecretary of the Turkish Foreign Ministry, gave him a two-page ultimatum. Syria completely ignored the Turkish complaints, and by October 1998, Turkey began to threaten military force, and Syria entered dialogue but denied ever supporting the PKK, insisting that Turkish relations with Syria had only deteriorated because of Turkish support for Israel. The Turkish military eventually gathered on the border, in addition to Israeli soldiers in Lebanon and the Golan Heights, prompting the Syrian government to sign the Adana Agreement on October 20, ending support for the PKK and expelling Öcalan, who was later arrested in 1999. The relations between the PKK and Russia also weakened after 1998.

=== Syrian civil war ===
Turkish intelligence and military officers verified that the Assad government had in fact stopped supporting the PKK immediately after 1998, and their relations began to improve, although they again started accusing Syria of harboring the PKK, even before the Syrian civil war broke out in 2011. The Democratic Union Party (PYD), founded in 2003, was seen as the main front of the PKK in Syria. From 2003 to 2011, the PYD remained rather politically inactive compared to the PKK, and generally kept its presence covert. After the Syrian civil war broke out, Turkey began accusing Syria and Iran of supporting the PKK, despite both countries having earlier cut ties with the group. At the beginning of the Syrian civil war, PUK leader and Iraqi president Jalal Talabani was said to have arranged a deal between the PKK, Syrian government, and Iranian government, which included an end to PJAK attacks on Iran, and an overflow of PKK militants leaving Iraq and Turkey to join the PYD in Syria. Bashar al-Assad in 2011 was accused of reviving the pro-PKK policy of Hafez al-Assad from the 1990s.

The Kurdish political scene in Syria was diverse, and there were many groups, some more independent than others. Some had ties with Iraqi Kurdish parties, such as the KDP-S with the KDP, and the Kurdish Democratic Progressive Party with the PUK. One of the main strategies of the Assad government was to allow the existence of multiple Kurdish parties to keep them fragmented. The PYD played a role in recruiting Syrian Kurds to join the PKK and fight in Turkey, which was seen as beneficial to Assad as the more radical elements were leaving Syria.

When the Syrian Army left its major northern garrisons in July 2012, they reportedly left supplies and arms for the PYD, which was seen as the breaking point which highlighted the renewal of Syrian support for the PKK from the 1980s and 1990s. Armed confrontations between the Assad government and PYD were usually quick and sporadic local disputes. Syrian opposition groups criticized the PYD for its relationship with Assad, and there were clashes between the PYD and FSA as early as mid-2012. The PKK, which traced its relationship with Syria, Iran, and Russia back to the Cold War, began leaning more towards Iran, the PUK, and Russia, by late 2013, with its "marriage of convenience" with Assad also taking a clear shape. The rise of the Islamic State in 2014 arguably strengthened the alliance. Even by 2016 and 2017, the PYD had little motivation to break ties with Assad or his Russian and Iranian supporters.
